= Marketplace =

Space in which a market operates

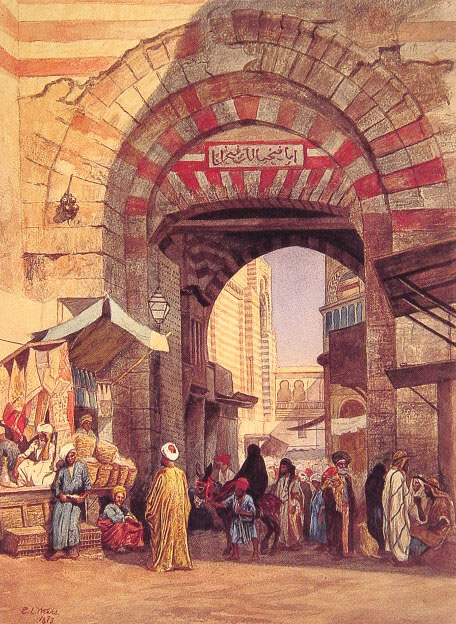
The Moorish Bazaar by Edwin Lord Weeks, 1873.

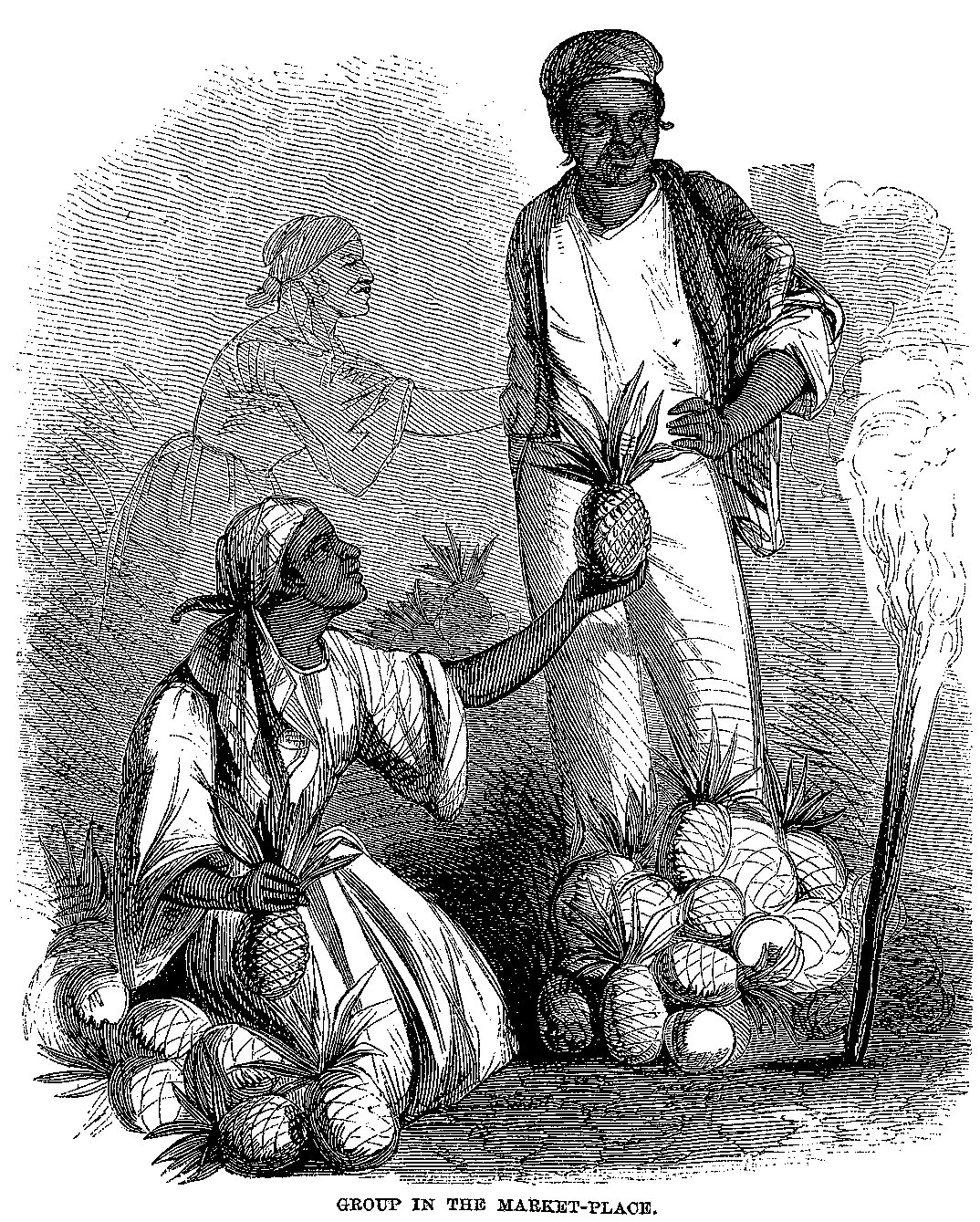
Group in the Marketplace, Jamaica, from Harper's Monthly Magazine, Vol. XXII, 1861, p. 176.

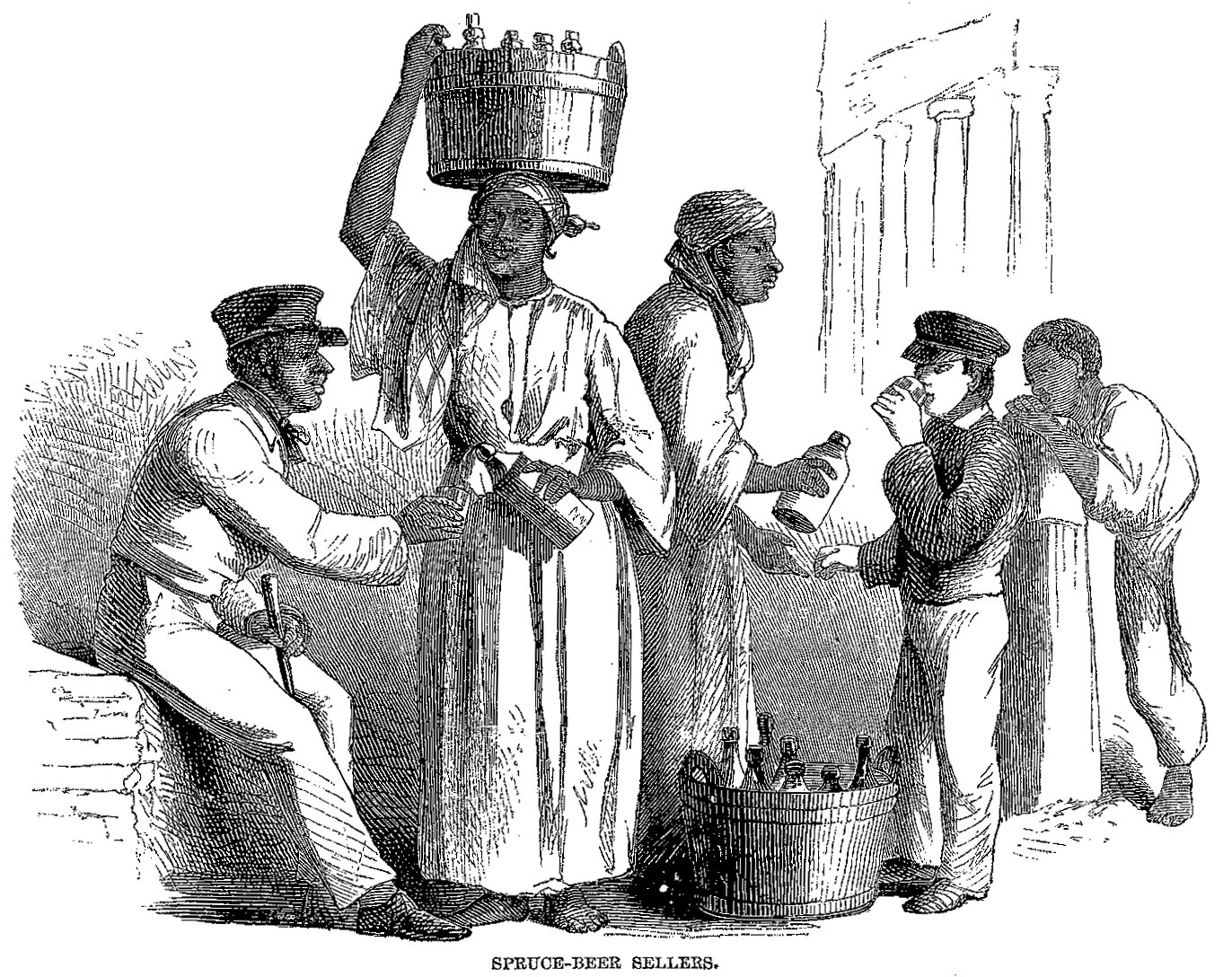
Spruce Beer Sellers in Jamaica, from Harper's Monthly Magazine, Vol. XXII, 1861, p. 176.

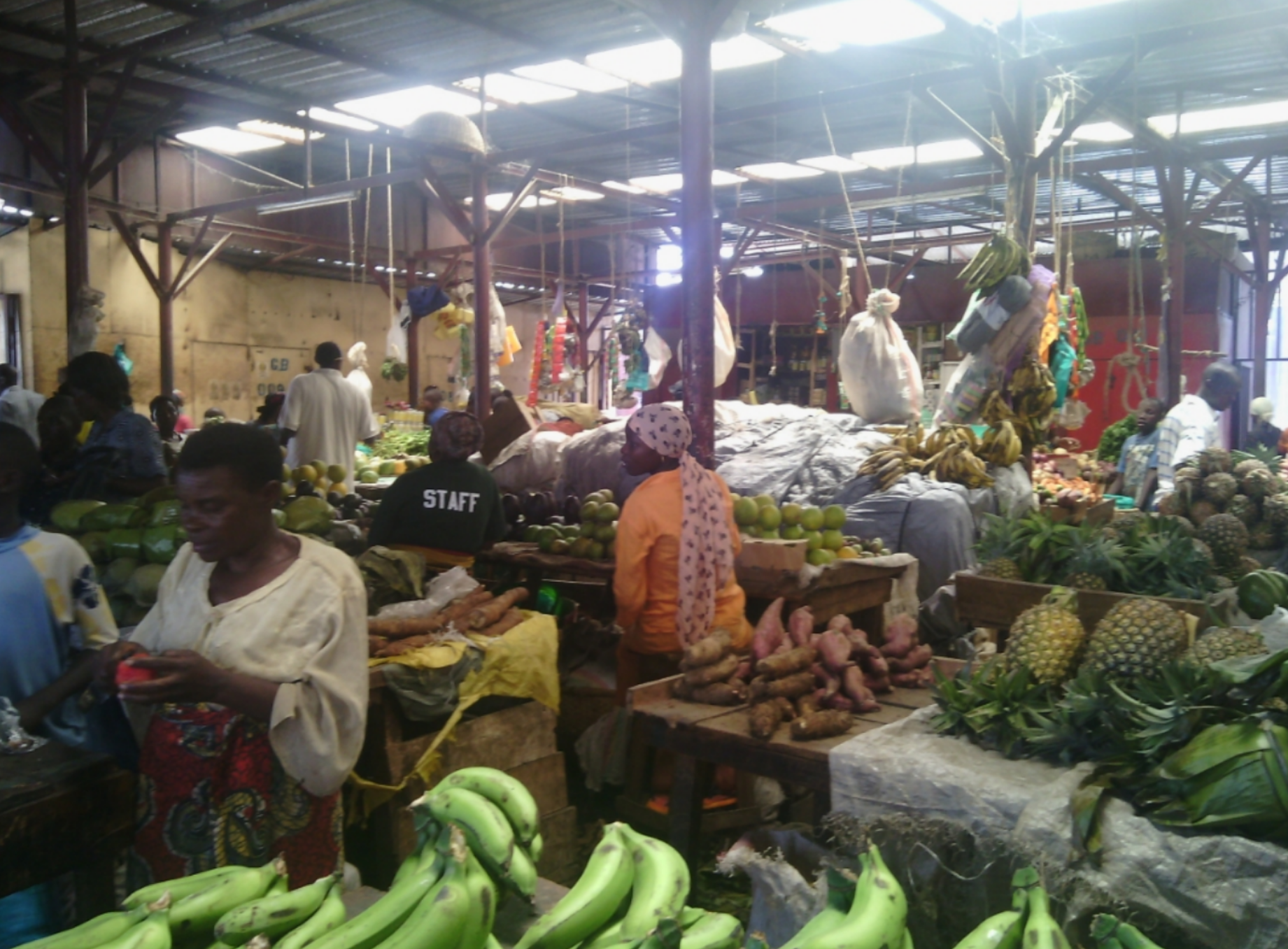
Traditional marketplace in Africa

A marketplace, market place, or simply market, is a location (physical or virtual) where people regularly gather for the purchase and sale of provisions, livestock, and other goods. In different parts of the world, a marketplace may be labelled a souk (from Arabic), a bazaar (from Persian), a fixed mercado (Spanish), an itinerant tianguis (Mexico), or a palengke (Philippines). Some markets operate daily (permanent markets) while others take place once a week or on less frequent specified days such as festival days (periodic markets). The form that a marketplace takes depends on a locality's population, culture, ambience, and geographic conditions. The term marketplace covers many locations for trading, such as market squares, market halls, food halls, and their different varieties. Marketplaces can be both outdoors and indoors, or (in the modern world) online.

Markets have existed for as long as humans have engaged in trade. The earliest bazaars may have originated in Persia, from where the phenomenon spread to the rest of the Middle East and to Europe. Documentary sources suggest that zoning policies confined trading to particular parts of cities in Iran from around 3000 BCE, providing the pre-conditions for the emergence of a bazaar. Middle Eastern bazaars were typically long strips with stalls on either side and a covered roof to protect traders and purchasers from the fierce sun. In Europe, informal, unregulated markets gradually made way for a system of formal, chartered markets from the 12th century CE. Throughout the medieval period, increased regulation of marketplace practices, especially weights and measures, gave consumers confidence in the quality of market goods and the fairness of prices. Around the globe, markets have evolved in different ways depending on local ambient conditions, especially weather, tradition, and culture. In the Middle East, markets tend to be covered, to protect traders and shoppers from the sun. In milder climates, markets are often open-air. In Asia, a system of morning markets trading in fresh produce and night markets trading in non-perishables is common.

Today, potential customers can access some marketplaces electronically or on the internet through e-commerce or matching platforms. In many countries, shopping at a local market is a standard feature of daily routine. Given the marketplace's role in ensuring food supply for a population, marketplaces are often highly regulated by a central authority. In many places, designated marketplaces have become listed sites of historic and architectural significance and represent part of a town's or a country's cultural assets. For these reasons, they have often become popular tourist-destinations.

== Etymology ==
The term market comes from the Latin mercatus ("market place"). The earliest recorded use of the term market in English is in the Anglo-Saxon Chronicle of 963, a work that was created during the reign of Alfred the Great (r. 871–899) and subsequently distributed, copied throughout English monasteries. The exact phrase was "Ic wille þæt markete beo in þe selue tun", meaning "I desire that there be a market in the same town".

== History ==
=== In prehistory ===
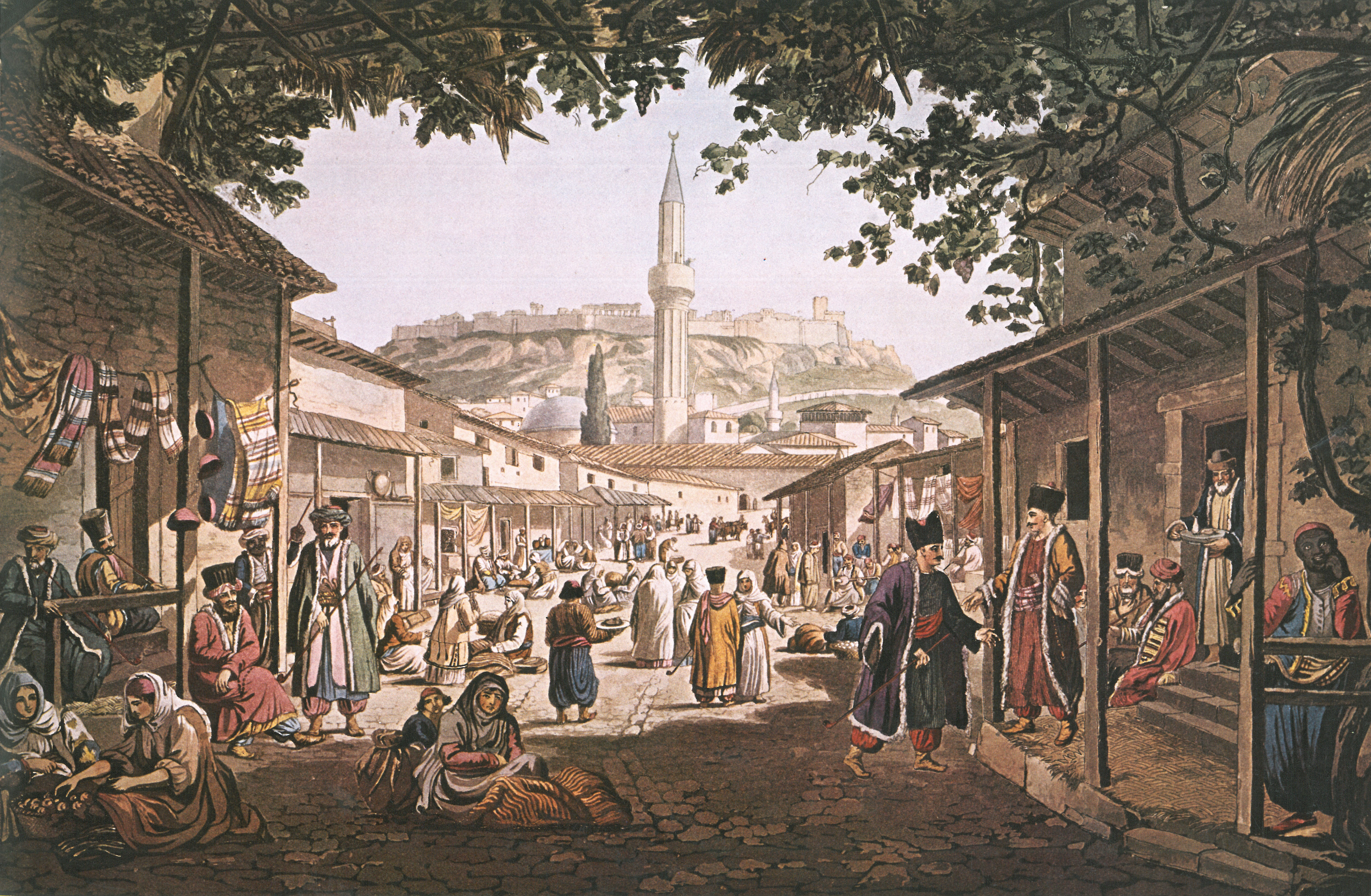
The Bazaar of Athens by Edward Dodwell, 1821

Markets have existed since ancient times. Some historians have argued that a type of market has existed since humans first began to engage in trade. Open air and public markets were known in ancient Babylonia, Assyria, Phoenicia, Greece, Egypt, and the Arabian Peninsula. However, not all societies developed a system of markets. The Greek historian Herodotus noted that markets did not evolve in ancient Persia.

Across the Mediterranean and Aegean, a network of markets emerged from the early Bronze Age. A vast array of goods were traded, including salt, lapis lazuli, dyes, cloth, metals, pots, ceramics, statues, spears, and other implements. Archaeological evidence suggests that Bronze Age traders segmented trade routes according to geographical circuits. Both produce and ideas travelled along these trade routes.

In the Middle East, documentary sources suggest that a form of bazaar first developed around 3000 BCE. Early bazaars occupied a series of alleys along the length of the city, typically stretching from one city gate to a different gate on the other side of the city. The bazaar at Tabriz, for example, stretches along kilometers of street and is the longest vaulted bazaar in the world. Moosavi argues that the Middle Eastern bazaar evolved in a linear pattern, whereas the market places of the West were more centralised. The Greek historian Herodotus noted that in Egypt, roles were reversed compared with other cultures, and Egyptian women frequented the market and carried on trade, while the men remained at home weaving cloth. He also described the Babylonian marriage market, an account that inspired an 1875 painting by Edwin Long.

=== In antiquity ===
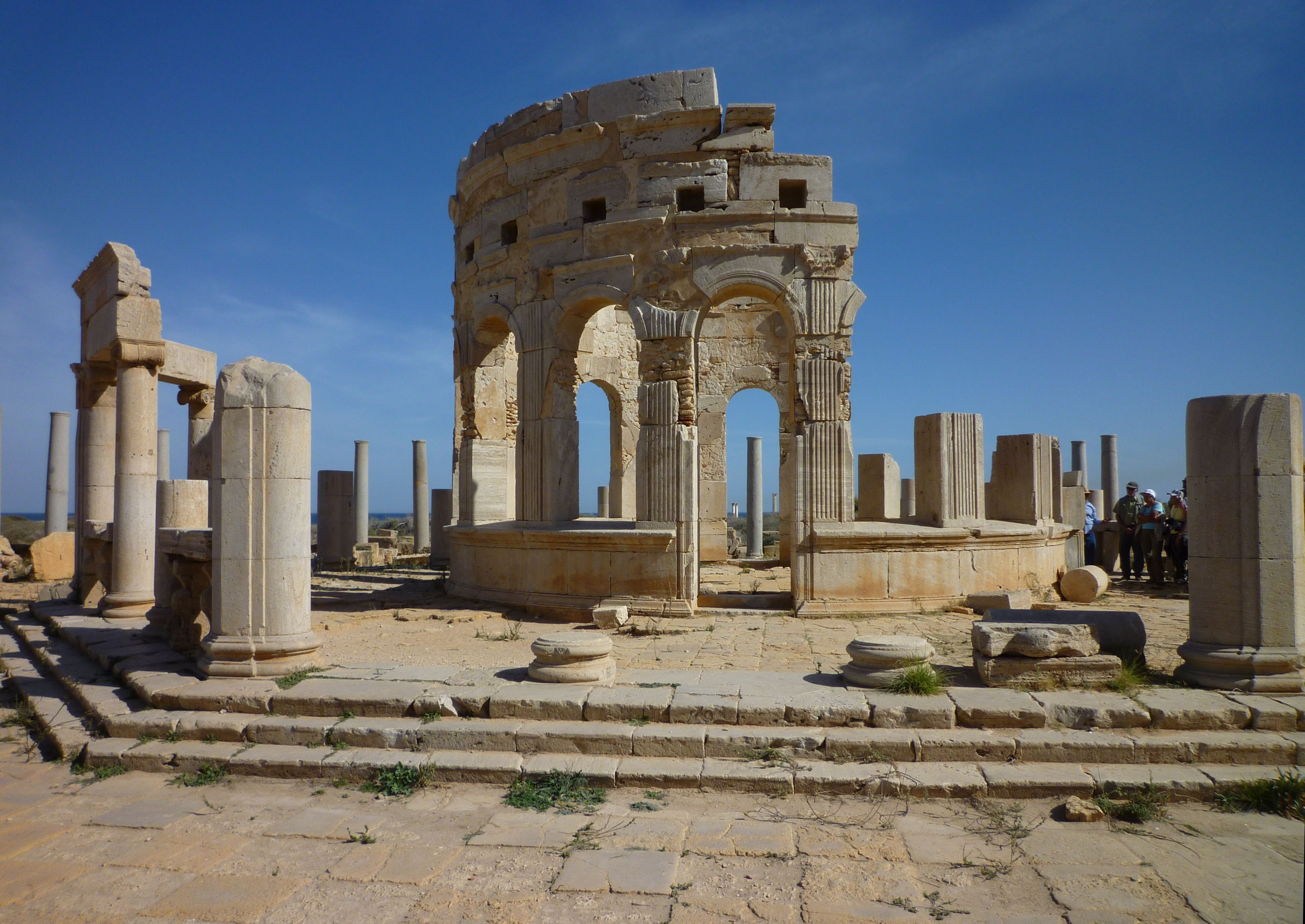
Ruins of the macellum (market-place) at Leptis Magna, Carthage

In antiquity, markets were typically situated in the town's centre. The market was surrounded by alleyways inhabited by skilled artisans, such as metal workers, leather workers, and carpenters. These artisans may have sold wares directly from their premises, but also prepared goods for sale on market days. Across ancient Greece, market places were to be found in most city states, where they operated within the agora (open space). Between 550 and 350 BCE, Greek stallholders clustered together according to the type of goods carried – fish-sellers were in one place, clothing in another, and sellers of more expensive goods such as perfumes, bottles, and jars were located in a separate building. The Greeks organised trade into separate zones, all located near the city centre and known as stoa. A freestanding colonnade with a covered walkway, the stoa was both a place of commerce and a public promenade, situated within or adjacent to the agora. At the agora in Athens, officials were employed by the government to oversee weights, measures, and coinage to ensure that the people were not cheated in market place transactions. The rocky and mountainous terrain in Greece made it difficult for producers to transport goods or surpluses to local markets, giving rise to the kapēlos, a specialised type of retailer who operated as an intermediary purchasing produce from farmers and transporting it over short distances to the city markets.

In ancient Rome, trade took place in the forum. Rome had two forums: the Forum Romanum and Trajan's Forum. Trajan's Market at Trajan's forum, built around 100–110 CE, was a vast expanse, comprising multiple buildings with shops on four levels. The Roman forum was arguably the earliest example of a permanent retail shopfront. In antiquity, exchange involved direct selling via merchants or peddlers and bartering systems were commonplace. In the Roman world, the central market primarily served the local peasantry. Market stall holders were primarily local primary producers who sold small surpluses from their individual farming activities and also artisans who sold leather goods, metalware and pottery. Consumers were made up of several different groups; farmers who purchased minor farm equipment and a few luxuries for their homes and urban dwellers who purchased basic necessities. Major producers such as the great estates were sufficiently attractive for merchants to call directly at their farm gates, obviating the producers' need to attend local markets. The very wealthy landowners managed their own distribution, which may have involved importing and exporting. The nature of export markets in antiquity is well documented in ancient sources and archaeological case studies.

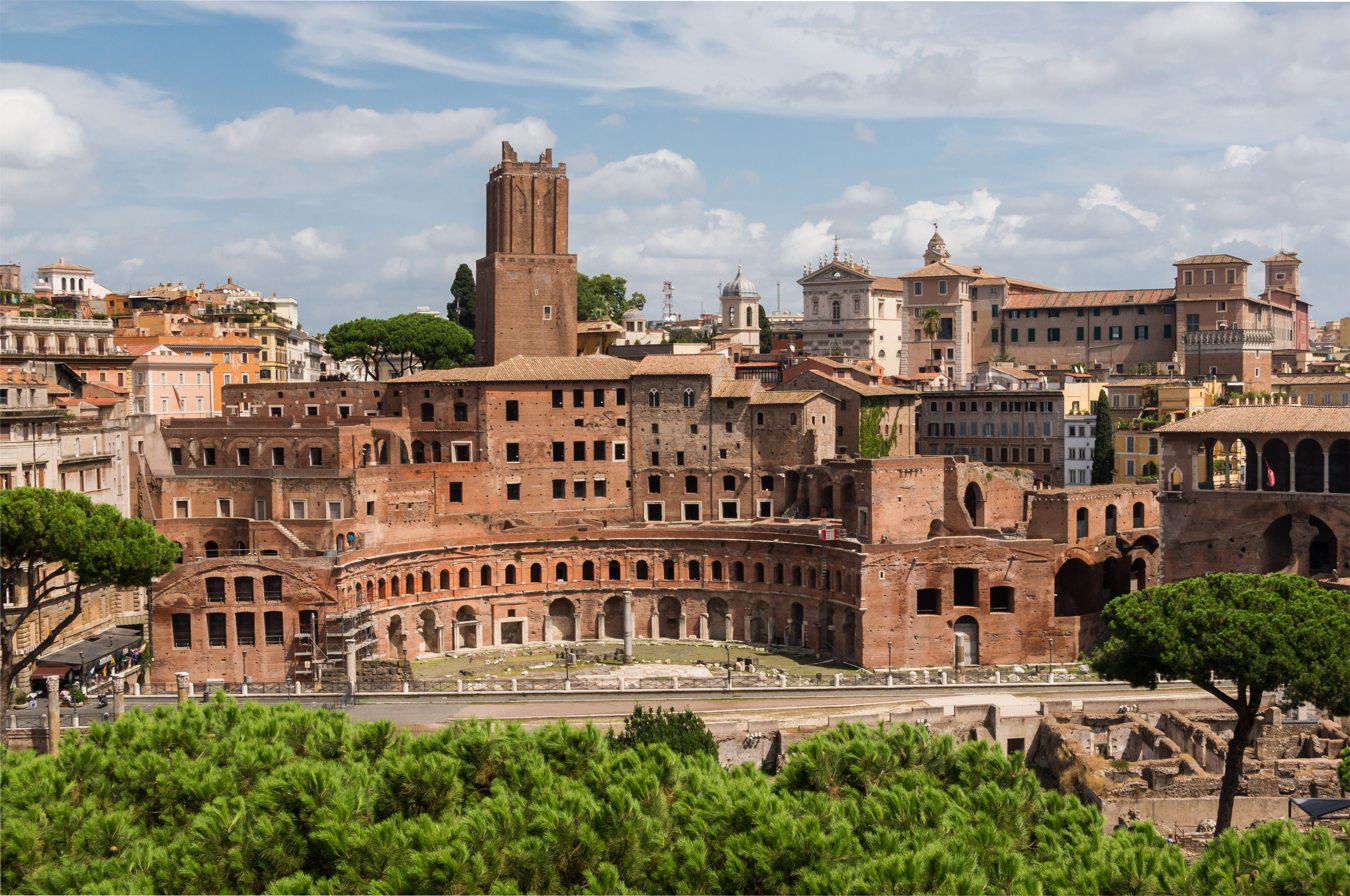
Trajan's Market, Rome, Italy

At Pompeii, multiple markets served the population of approximately 12,000. Produce markets were located in the vicinity of the Forum, while livestock markets were situated on the city's perimeter, near the amphitheatre. A long narrow building at the north-west corner of the Forum was some type of market, possibly a cereal market. On the opposite corner stood the macellum, thought to have been a meat and fish market. Market stall-holders paid a market tax for the right to trade on market days. Some archaeological evidence suggests that markets and street vendors were controlled by the local government. A graffito on the outside of a large shop documents a seven-day cycle of markets: "Saturn's day at Pompeii and Nuceria, Sun's day at Atella and Nola, Moon's day at Cumae", etc. The presence of an official commercial calendar suggests something of the market's importance to community life and trade. Markets were also important centres of social life.

=== In medieval Europe ===
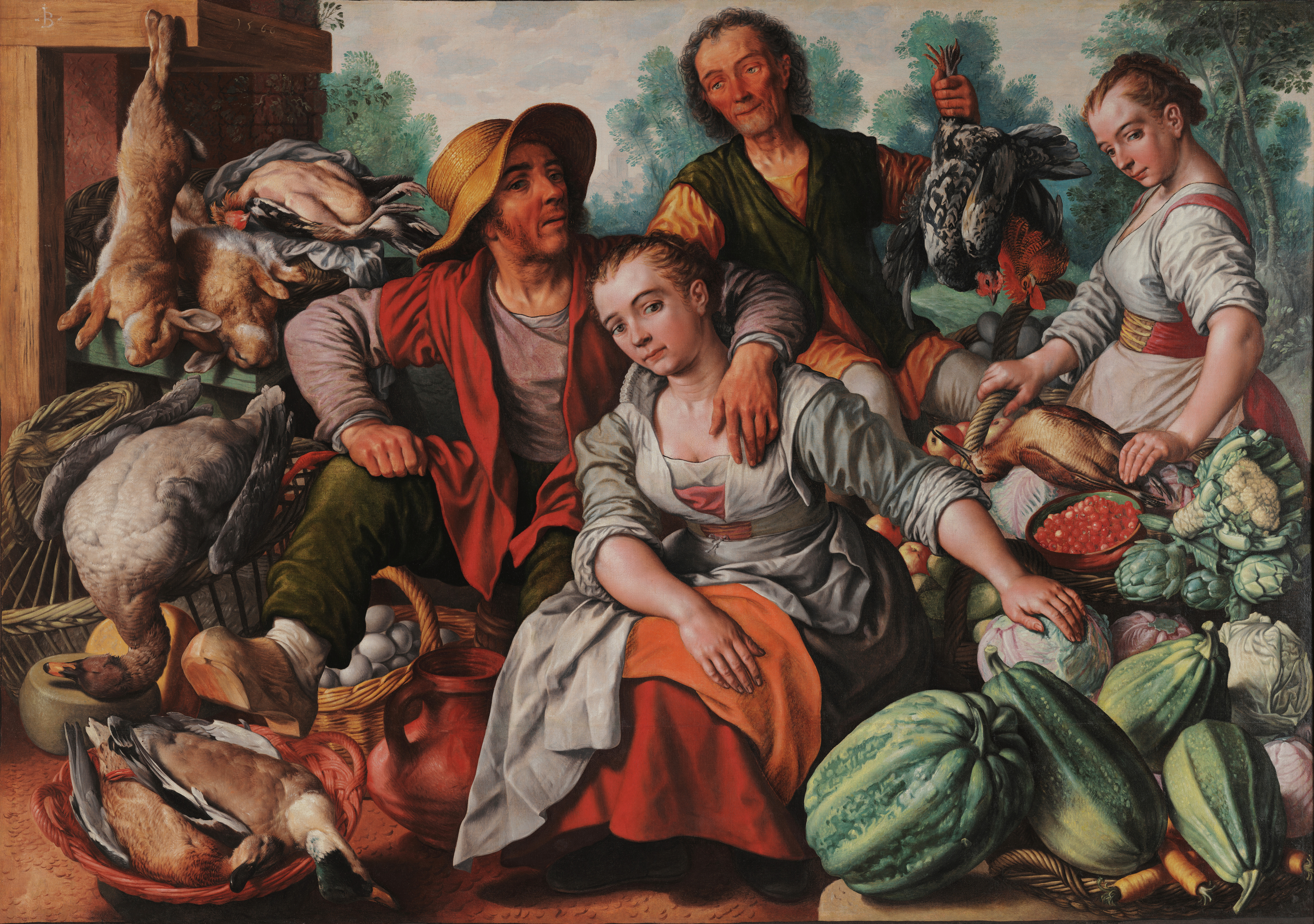
Market in early modern times by Joachim Beuckelaer, 1566

In early Western Europe, markets developed close to monasteries, castles or royal residences. Priories and aristocratic manorial households created considerable demand for goods and services, both luxuries and necessities, and also afforded some protection to merchants and traders. These centres of trade attracted sellers which would stimulate the growth of the town. The Domesday Book of 1086 lists 50 markets in England; however, many historians believe this figure underestimates the actual number of markets in operation at the time. In England, some 2,000 new markets were established between 1200 and 1349. By 1516, England had some 2,464 markets and 2,767 fairs, while Wales had 138 markets and 166 fairs.

From the 12th century, English monarchs awarded a charter to local Lords to create markets and fairs for a town or village. A charter protected the town's trading privileges in return for an annual fee. Once a chartered market was granted for specific market days, a nearby rival market could not open on the same days. Fairs, which were usually held annually, and almost always associated with a religious festival, traded in high value goods, while regular weekly or bi-weekly markets primarily traded in fresh produce and necessities. Although a fair's primary purpose was trade, it typically included some elements of entertainment, such as dance, music, or tournaments. As the number of markets increased, market towns situated themselves sufficiently far apart so as to avoid competition, but close enough to permit local producers a round trip within one day (about 10 km). Some British open-air markets have been operating continuously since the 12th century.

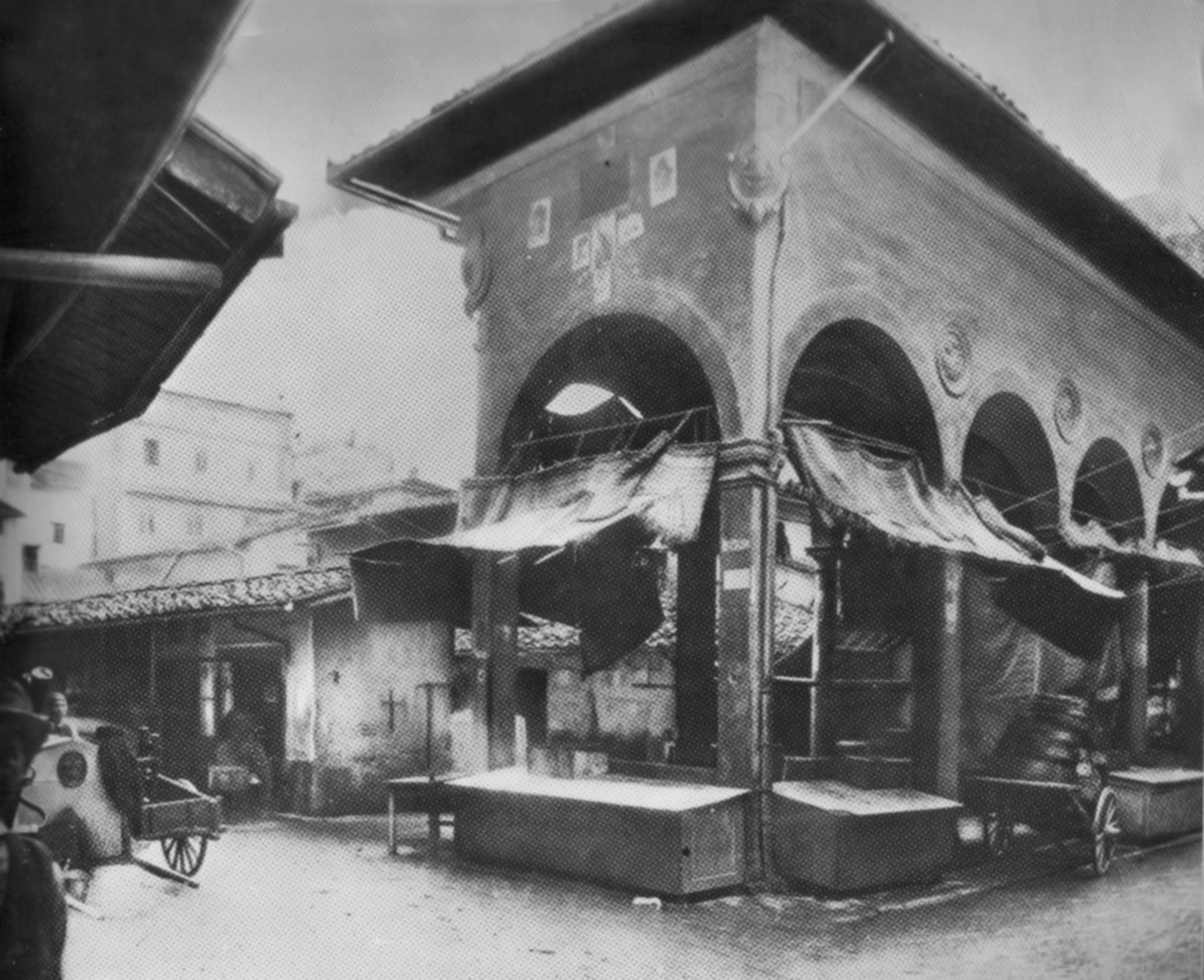
Loggia del Pesce, Florence (formerly part of the Piazza del Mercato Vecchio, now in the Piazza Clompi) just prior to its demolition in 1880

A pattern of market trading using mobile stalls under covered arcades was probably established in Italy with the open loggias of Mercato Nuovo (1547) designed and constructed by Giovanni Battista del Tasso (and funded by the Medici family); Mercato Vecchio, Florence, designed by Giorgio Vasari (1567); and Loggia del Grano (1619) by Giulio Parigi.

Braudel and Reynold have made a systematic study of European market towns between the thirteenth and fifteenth century. Their investigation shows that in regional districts markets were held once or twice a week while daily markets were common in larger cities. Over time, permanent shops began opening daily and gradually supplanted the periodic markets, while peddlers or itinerant sellers continued to fill in any gaps in distribution.

During the Middle Ages, the physical market was characterised by transactional exchange. Shops had higher overhead costs, but were able to offer regular trading hours and a relationship with customers and may have offered added value services, such as credit terms to reliable customers. The economy was primarily characterised by local trading in which goods were traded across relatively short distances.

Beach markets, which were known in north-western Europe, during the Viking period, were primarily associated with the sale of fish. From around the 11th century, the number and variety of imported goods sold at beach markets began to increase. giving consumers access to a broader range of exotic and luxury goods. Throughout the medieval period, markets became more international. The historian, Braudel, reports that in 1600, grain moved just 5–10 miles; cattle 40–70 miles; wool and wollen cloth 20–40 miles. However, following the European age of discovery, goods were imported from afar – calico cloth from India, porcelain, silk and tea from China, spices from India and South-East Asia and tobacco, sugar, rum and coffee from the New World.

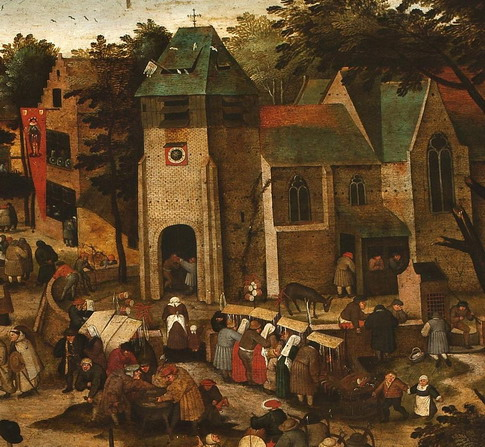
Performance at the fair by Pieter Brueghel the Younger, late 16th century

Across the boroughs of England, a network of chartered markets sprang up between the 12th and 16th centuries, giving consumers reasonable choice in the markets they preferred to patronise. A study on the purchasing habits of the monks and other individuals in medieval England suggests that consumers of the period were relatively discerning. Purchase decisions were based on purchase criteria such as the consumer's perceptions of the range, quality, and price of goods. Such considerations informed decisions about where to make purchases and which markets to patronise.

As the number of charters granted increased, competition between market towns also increased. In response to competitive pressures, towns invested in developing a reputation for quality produce, efficient market regulation and good amenities for visitors such as covered accommodation. By the thirteenth century, counties with important textile industries were investing in purpose built halls for the sale of cloth. London's Blackwell Hall became a centre for cloth, Bristol became associated with a particular type of cloth known as Bristol red, Stroud was known for producing fine woollen cloth, the town of Worsted became synonymous with a type of yarn; Banbury and Essex were strongly associated with cheeses.

In the market economy, goods are ungraded and unbranded, so that consumers have relatively few opportunities to evaluate quality prior to consumption. Consequently, supervision of weights, measures, food quality, and prices was a key consideration. In medieval society, regulations for such matters appeared initially at the local level. The Charter of Worcester, written between 884 and 901 provided for fines for dishonest trading, amongst other things. Such local regulations were codified in 13th century England in what became known as the Statute of Winchester. This document outlined the assizes for 16 different trades, most of which were associated with markets – miller, baker, fisher, brewer, inn-keeper, tallow-chandler, weaver, cordwainer, etc. For each trade, regulations covered such issues as fraud, prices, quality, weights, and measures and so on. The assize was a formal codification of prior informal codes which had been practised for many years. The courts of assize were granted the power to enforce these regulations. The process of standardizing quality, prices and measures assisted markets to gain the confidence of buyers and made them more attractive to the public.

A sixteenth-century commentator, John Leland, described particular markets as "celebrate", "very good", "quik", and conversely as "poore", "meane", and "of no price". Over time, some products became associated with particular places, providing customers with valuable information about the types of goods, their quality and their region of origin. In this way, markets helped to provide an early form of product branding. Gradually, certain market towns earned a reputation for providing quality produce. Today, traders and showmen jealously guard the reputation of these historic chartered markets. The 18th-century commentator Daniel Defoe visited Sturbridge fair in 1723 and wrote a lengthy description which paints a picture of a highly organised, vibrant operation which attracted a large number of visitors from some distance away. "As for the people in the fair, they all universally eat, drink and sleep in their booths, and tents; and the said booths are so intermingled with taverns, coffee-houses, drinking-houses, eating-houses, cookshops &c, and all tents too, and so many butchers and higglers from all the neighbouring counties come in to the fair every morning, with beef, mutton, fowls, bread, cheese, eggs, and such things; and go with them from tent to tent and from door to door, that there is no want of provision of any kind, either dress'd or undress'd."

=== In Asia Minor ===
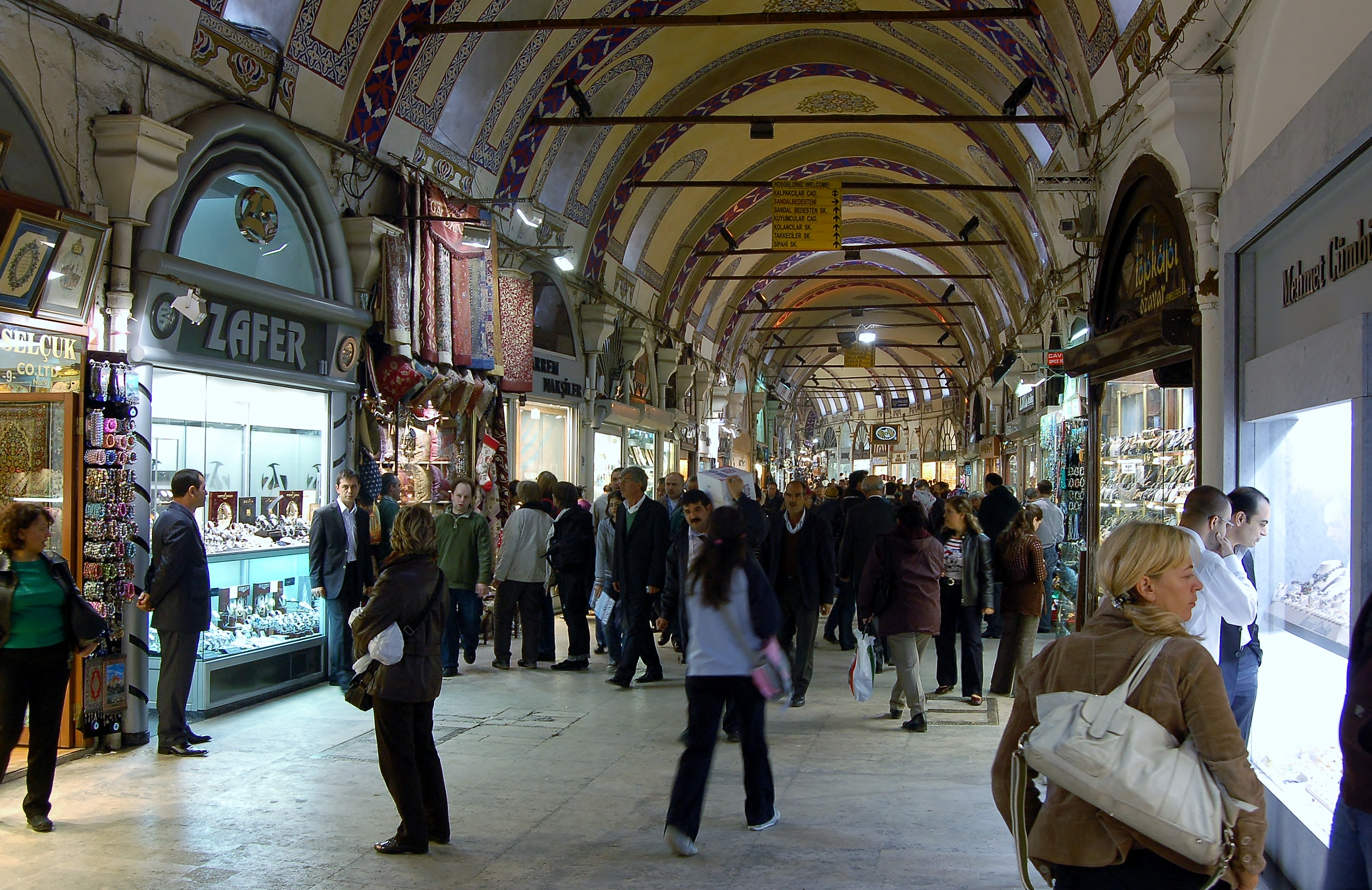
The Grand Bazaar in Istanbul, one of the oldest continuously operating market buildings in existence; it houses approximately 3600 retail shops

In the Asia Minor, prior to the 10th century, market places were situated on the perimeter of the city. Along established trade routes, markets were most often associated with the caravanserai typically situated just outside the city walls. However, when the marketplace began to become integrated into city structures, it was transformed into a covered area where traders could buy and sell with some protection from the elements. Markets at Mecca and Medina were known to be significant trade centres in the 3rd century (CE) and the nomadic communities were highly dependent on them for both trade and social interactions. The Grand Bazaar in Istanbul is often cited as the world's oldest continuously operating, purpose-built market; its construction began in 1455.

=== In Asia ===
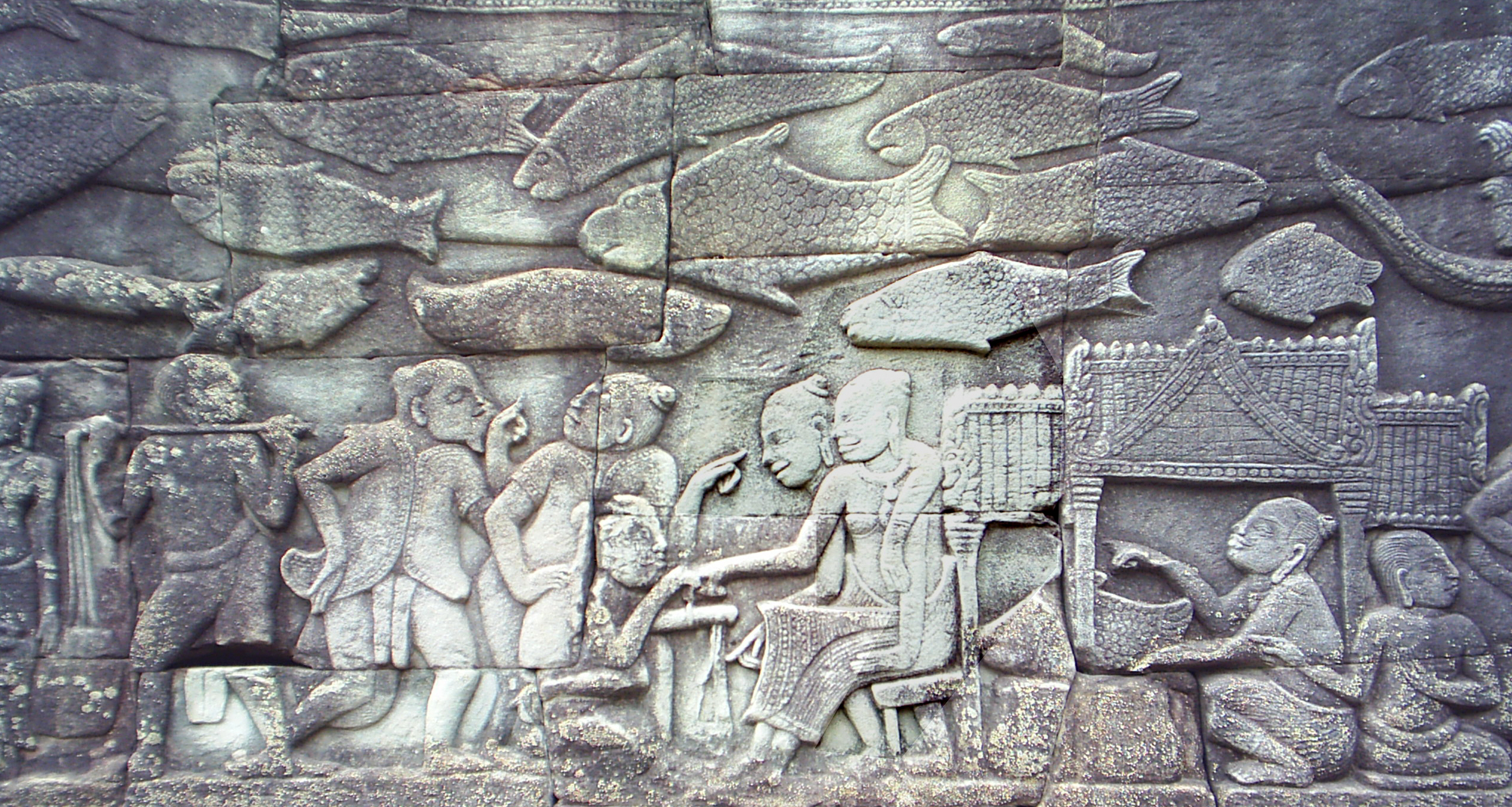
A bas-relief of the Bayon temple depicting a 12th-century Khmer marketplace

Dating the emergence of marketplaces in China is difficult. According to tradition, the first market was established by the legendary Shennong or the "Divine Farmer" who arranged for markets to be held at midday. In other ancient sayings, markets originally developed around wells in the town or village centre. Scholars, however, question the reliability of traditional narratives unless backed by archaeological evidence.

The earliest written references to markets dates to the time of Qi Huanggong (ruled 685 to 643 BCE). Qi's Prime Minister, the great reformer, Guan Zhong, divided the capital into 21 districts (xiang) of which three were dedicated to farmers, three to hand-workers and three to businessmen, who were instructed to settle near the markets. Some of these early markets have been the subject of archaeological surveys. For instance, the market at Yong, the capital of the Qi state, measured 3,000 square metres and was an outdoor market.

According to the Rites of Zhou, markets were highly organized and served different groups at different times of day; merchants at the morning market, every day people at the afternoon market and peddlers at the evening market. The marketplace also became the place were executions were carried out, rewards were published and decrees were read out.

During the Qin empire and the Han dynasty which followed it, markets were enclosed with walls and gates and strictly separated from residential areas. Vendors were arranged according to the type of commodity offered, and markets were strictly regulated with departments responsible for security, weights and measures, price-fixing, and certificates.

Over time, specialised markets began to emerge. In Luoyang, during the Tang Dynasty, a metal market was known. Outside the city walls were sheep and horse markets. Marco Polo's account of 13th century markets specifically mentions a silk market. He was also impressed by the size of markets. According to his account, the ten markets of Hangzhou, primarily a fish market, attracted 40,000 to 50,000 patrons on each of its three trading days each week.

In China, negative attitudes towards mercantile activity developed; merchants were the lowest class of society. High officials carefully distanced themselves from merchant classes. In 627, an edict prohibited those of rank five or higher from entering markets. One anecdote from the time of Empress Wu relates the tale of a fourth rank official who missed out on the opportunity for promotion after he was seen purchasing a steamed pancake from a market.

=== In the Middle East ===
Since circa 3000 BCE, bazaars have dominated the Middle East - respectively extending to Northern Africa - as regards to numerous areas from retail towards resources, with trade amongst merchants commonplace, likewise with bartering amongst participants. They are often described as economic and cultural hubs within cities across the Islamic world, and are generally the most bustling areas within urban localities. Given such dense activity, bazaars became an attraction for foreigners in exchanging resources, such as spices, textiles, labour, et cetera, drawing the attention of Arabs, Turks, Greeks, Persians, Jews as well as Indians, not to mention Westerners since the late-16th to early-17th centuries. In the modern era, bazaars remain a vital economic hub in numerous Arab nations.

=== In Mesoamerica ===
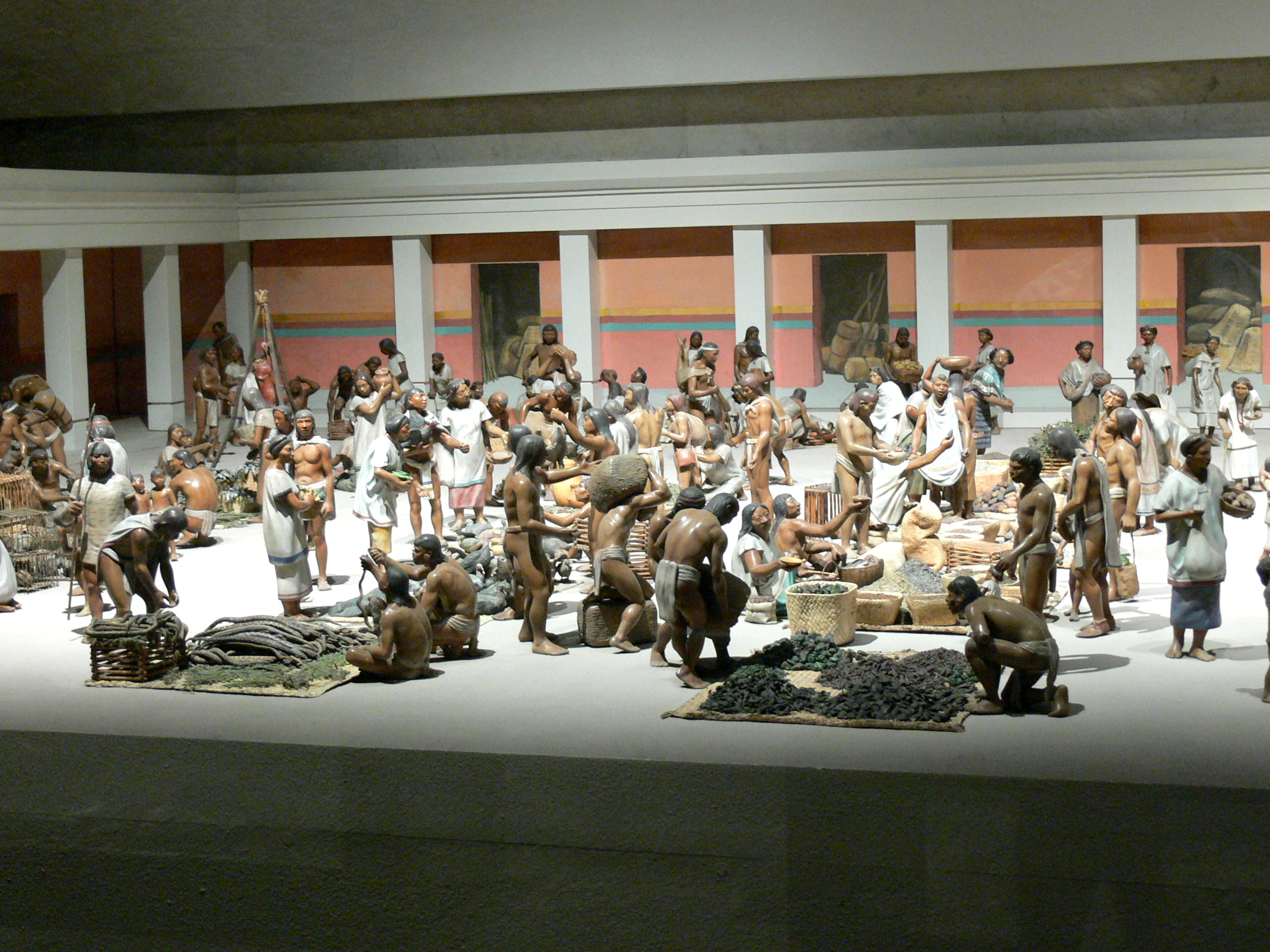
A model of an Aztec tianguis, National Museum of Anthropology

In Mesoamerica, a tiered system of traders developed independently. Extensive trade networks predated the Aztec empire by at least hundreds of years. Local markets where people purchased their daily necessities were known as tiyanquiztli (modern Spanish tianguis), while a pochteca was a professional merchant who travelled long distances to obtain rare goods or luxury items desired by the nobility. The system supported various levels of pochteca – from very high status through to minor traders who acted as a type of peddler to fill in gaps in the distribution system. Colonial sources also record Mayan market hubs at Acalan, Champotón, Chetumal, Bacalar, Cachi, Conil, Pole, Cozumel, Cochuah, Chauaca, Chichén Itzá, as well as markets marking the edges of Yucatecan canoe trade such as Xicalanco and Ulua. The Spanish conquerors commented on the impressive nature of the local markets in the 15th century. The Mexica (Aztec) market of Tlatelolco was the largest in all the Americas and said to be superior to those in Europe.

== Types ==
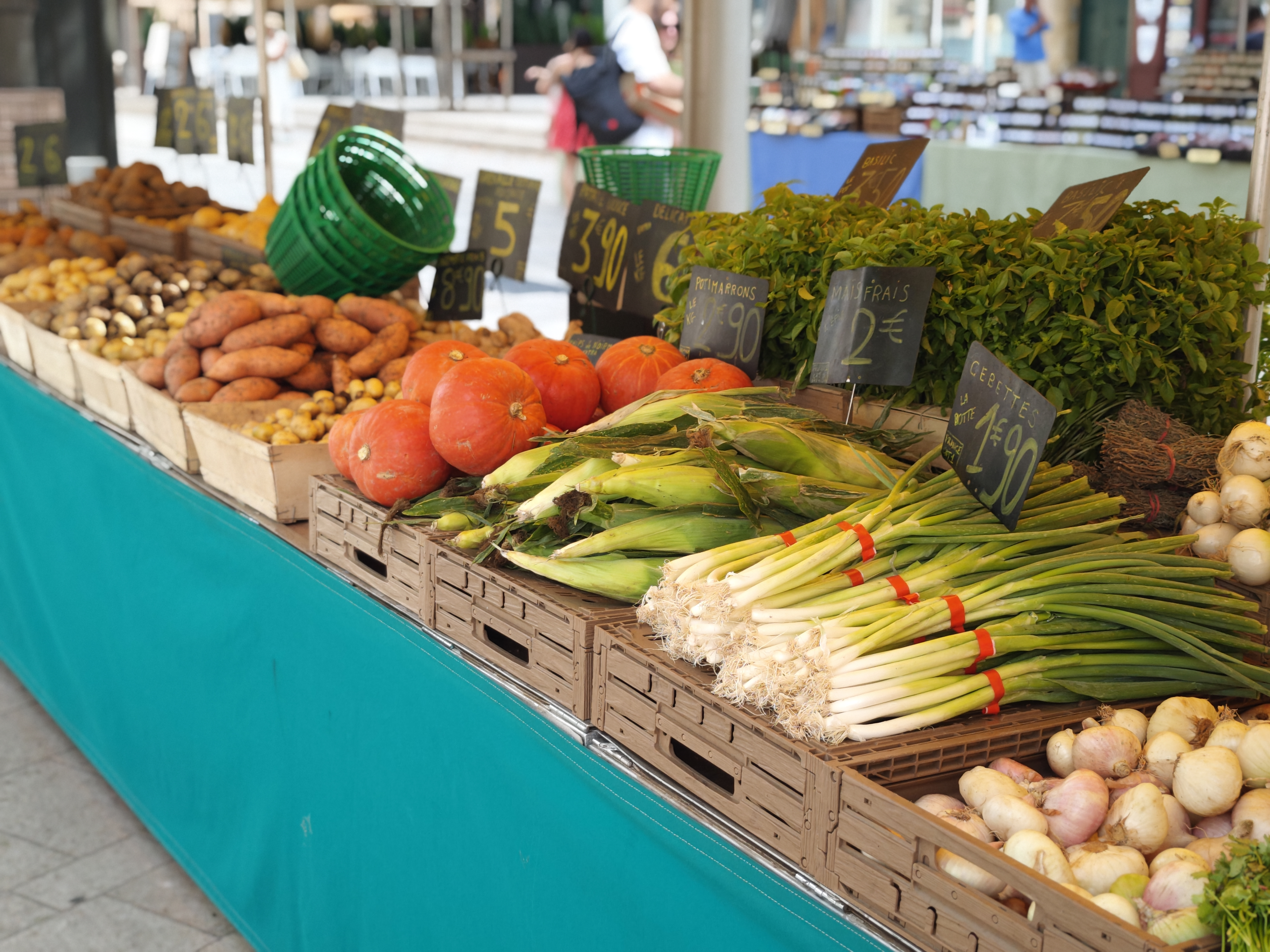
Fresh vegetables displayed for sale at an outdoor market in France.

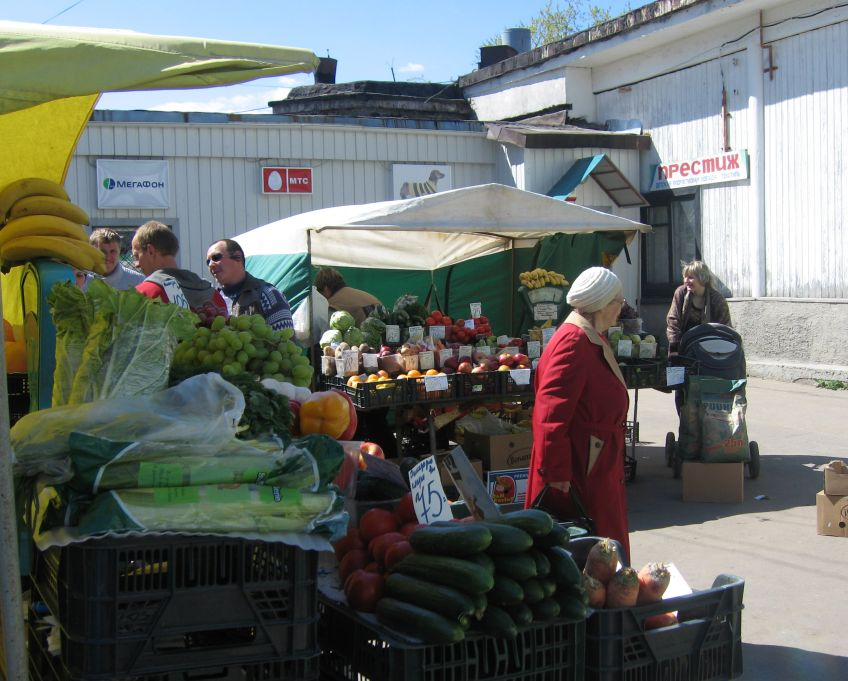
A market place in Sortavala, Karelia

There are many different ways to classify markets. One way is to consider the nature of the buyer and the market's place within the distribution system. This leads to two broad classes of market, namely retail market or wholesale markets. The economist, Alfred Marshall classified markets according to time period. In this classification, there are three types of market; the very short period market where the supply of a commodity remains fixed. Perishables, such as fruit, vegetables, meat, and fish fall into this group since goods must be sold within a few days and the quantity supplied is relatively inelastic. The second group is the short period market where the time in which the quantity supplied can be increased by improving the scale of production (adding labor and other inputs but not by adding capital). Many non-perishable goods fall into this category. The third category is the long-period market where the length of time can be improved by capital investment.

Other ways to classify markets include its trading area (local, national or international); its physical format or its produce.

Major physical formats of markets are:

- Bazaar: typically a covered market in the Middle East
- Car boot sale: a type of market where people come together to trade household and garden goods; very popular in the United Kingdom
- Dry market: a market selling durable goods such as fabric and electronics, as distinguished from "wet markets"
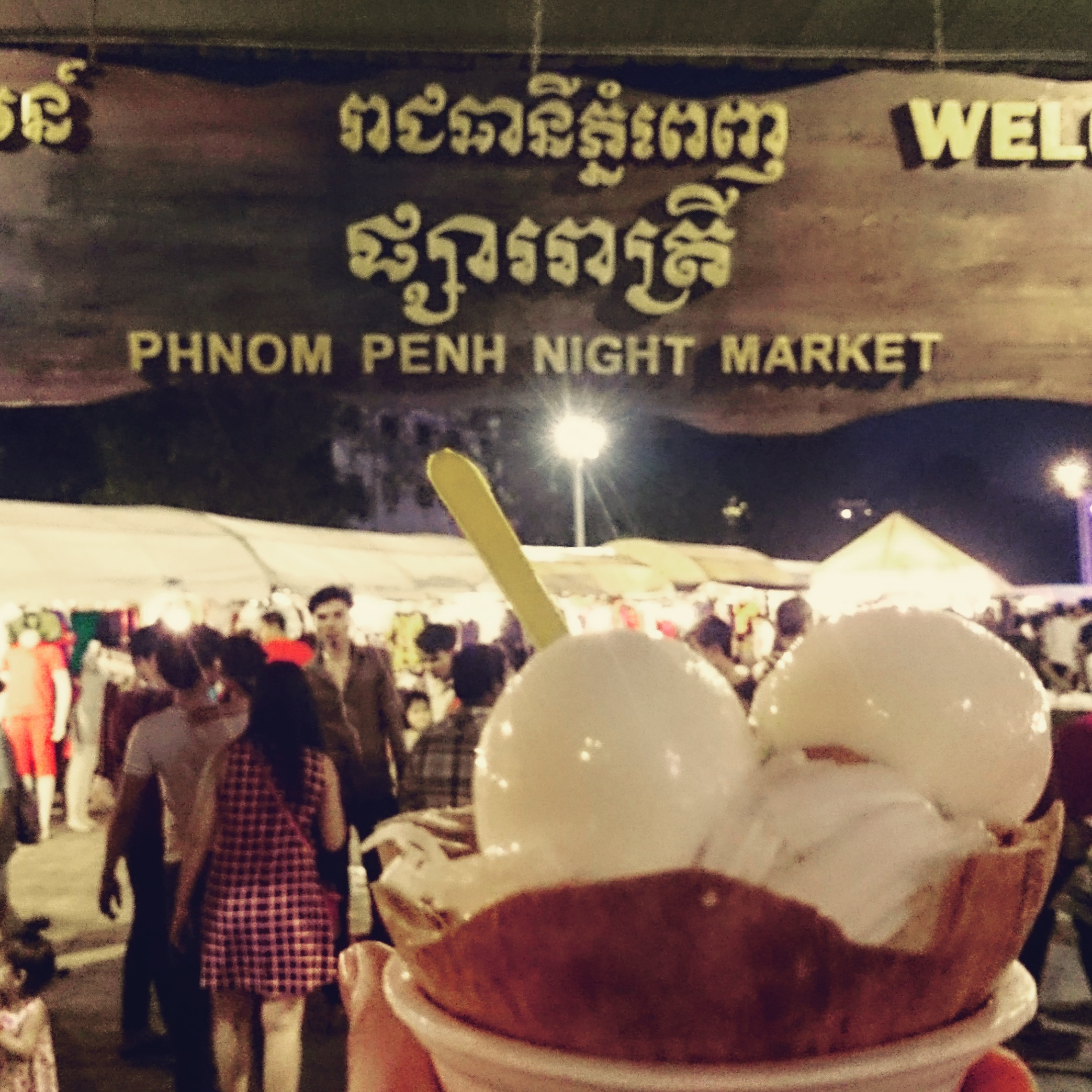
  A night market in the Cambodian capital
- E-commerce: an online marketplace for consumer products which can be sold anywhere in the world
- Indoor market of any sort
- Marketplace: an open space where a market is or was formerly held in a town
- Market square in Europe: open area usually in town centre with stalls selling goods in a public square
- Public market in the United States: an indoor, fixed market in a building and selling a variety of goods
- Street market: a public street with stalls along one or more sides of the street
- Floating market: where goods are sold from boats, chiefly found in Thailand, Indonesia and Vietnam
- Night market: Popular in many countries in Asia, opening at night and featuring much street food and a more leisurely shopping experience. In Indonesia and Malaysia they are known as pasar malam.
- Wet market (also known as a public market): a market selling fresh meat, fish, produce, and other perishable goods as distinguished from "dry markets"

Markets may feature a range of merchandise for sale, or they may be one of many specialist markets, such as:

- Animal markets (i.e. livestock markets)
- Antique markets
- Farmers' markets, focusing on fresh produce and gourmet food lines (preserves, chutneys, relishes, cheeses etc.) prepared from farm produce
- Fish markets
- Flea markets or swap meets, a type of bazaar that rents space to people who want to sell or barter merchandise. Used goods, low quality items, and high quality items at low prices are commonplace
- Flower markets, such as the Mercado Jamaica in Mexico City, the Bloemenmarkt in Amsterdam, and Lunar New Year Fair in Hong Kong and Guangzhou.
- Food halls, featuring gourmet food to consume on- and off-premises, such as those at Harrods (London) and Galeries Lafayette (Paris) department stores. In North America, these may be also referred to simply as "markets" (or "mercados" in Spanish), such as the West Side Market in Cleveland, Ponce City Market in Atlanta, and the Mercado Roma in Mexico City.
- Grey market: where second hand or recycled goods are sold (sometimes termed a green market)
- Handicraft markets
- Markets selling items used in the occult (for magic, by witches, etc.)
- Supermarkets and hypermarkets
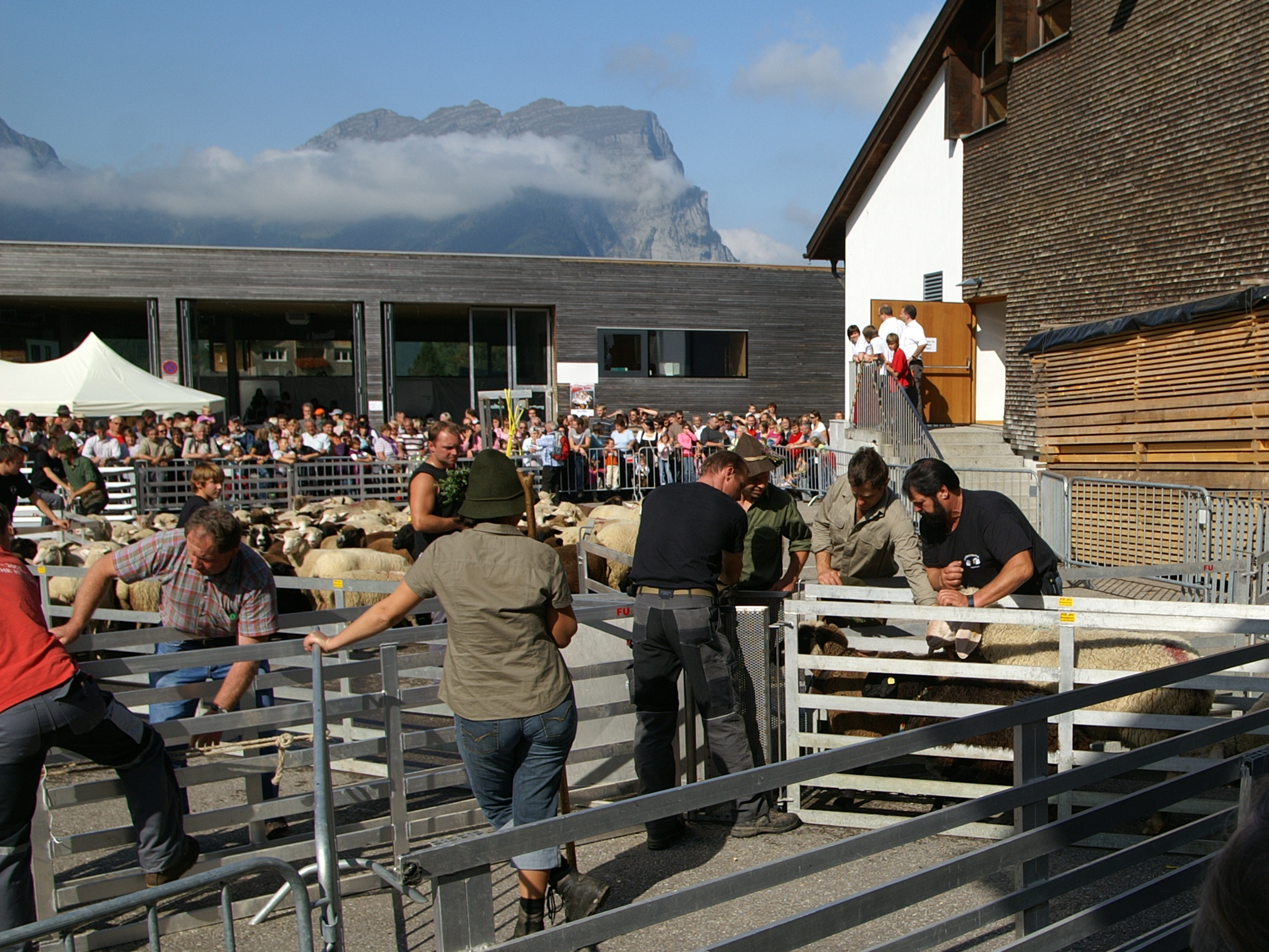
Livestock market at Schaufschod, 2009

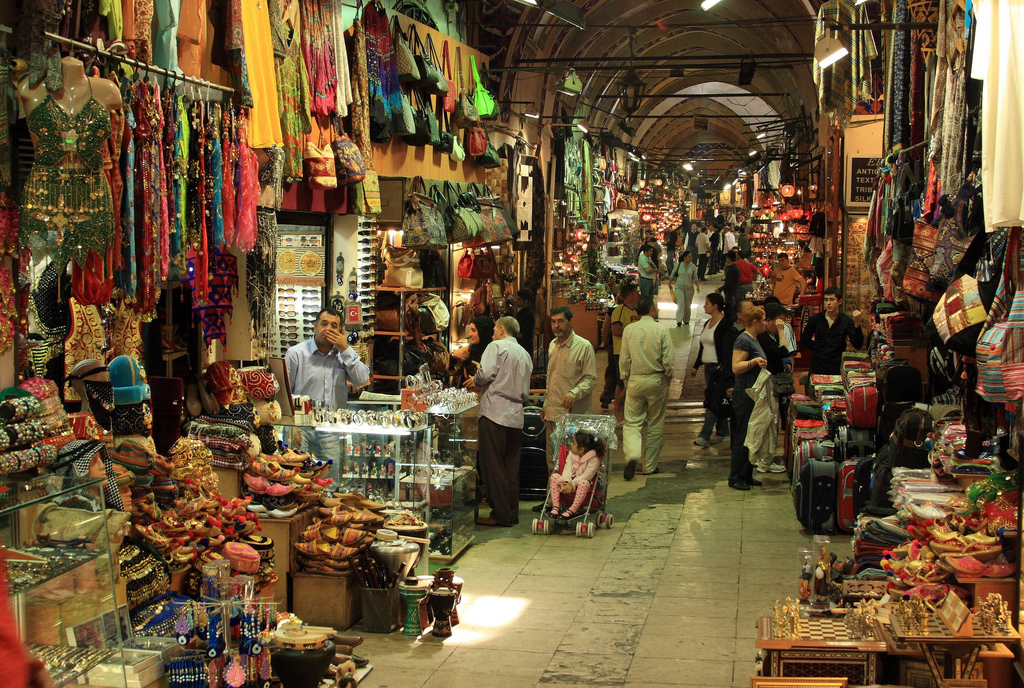
Bazaar: Grand Bazaar, Istanbul, Turkey

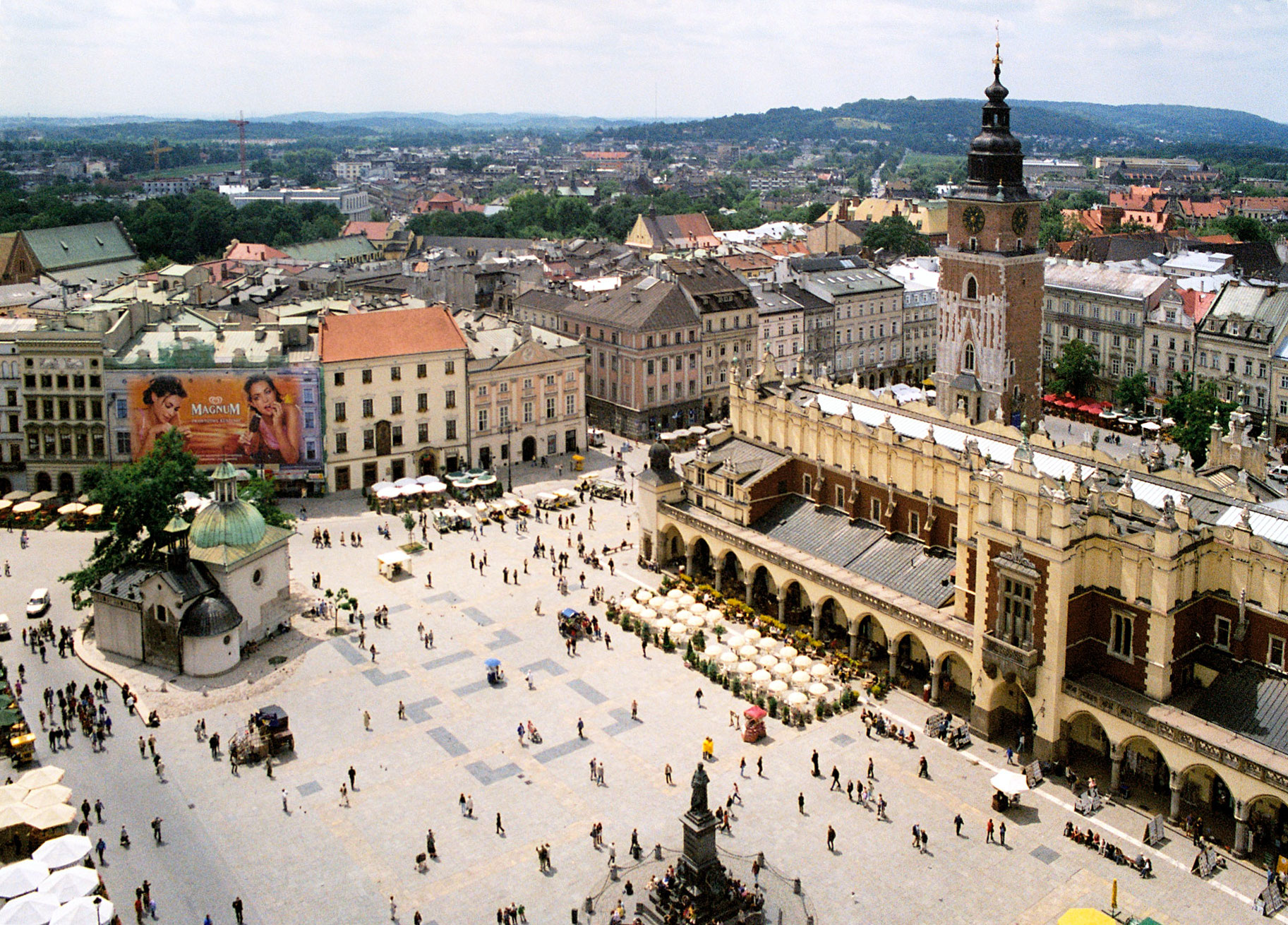
Marketplace: Main Market Square, Kraków, Poland: Europe's largest medieval town square

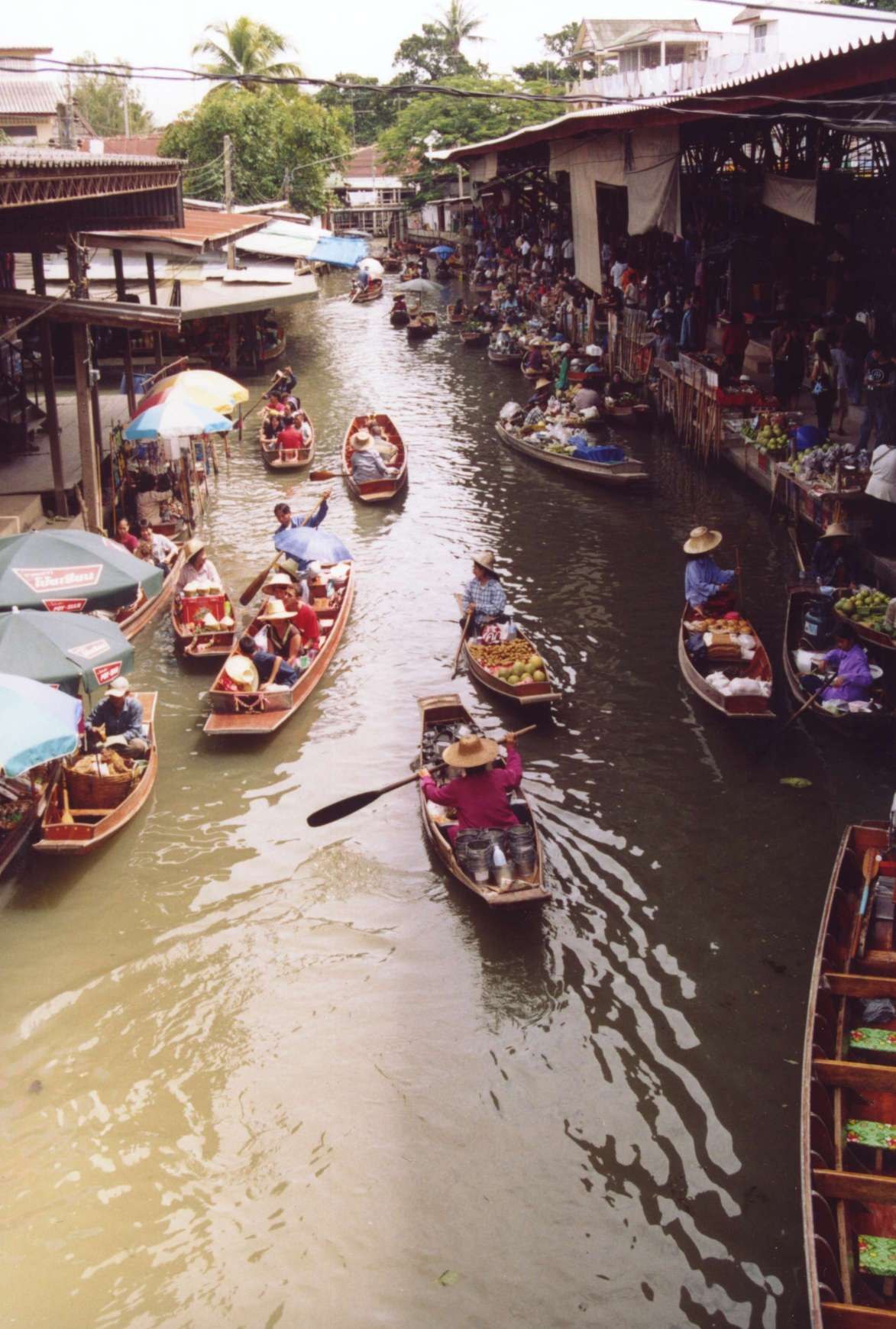
Floating market: Damnoen Saduak floating market in Ratchaburi, Thailand, is a famous tourist attraction.

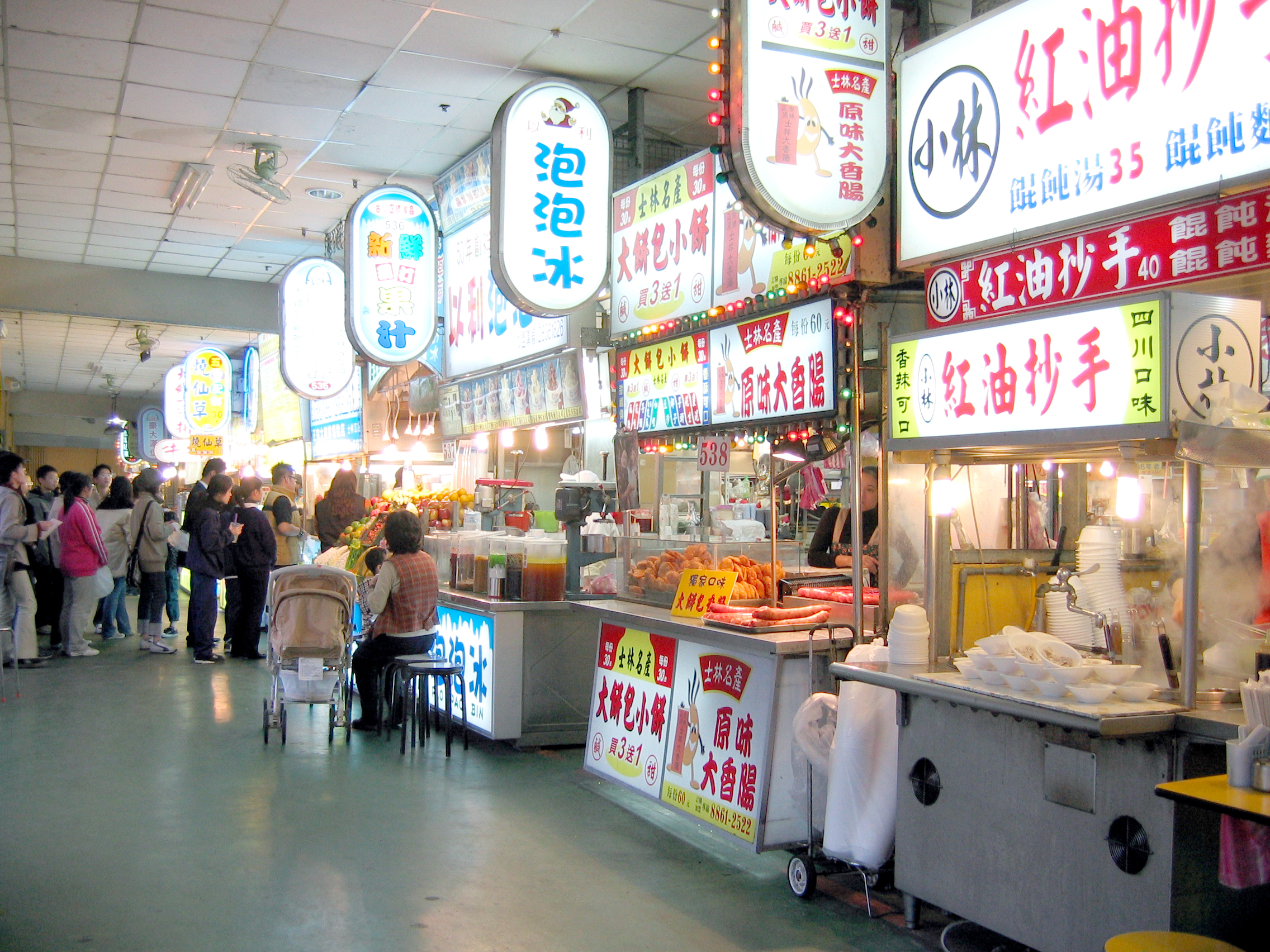
Night market: Shilin Night Market, Taiwan

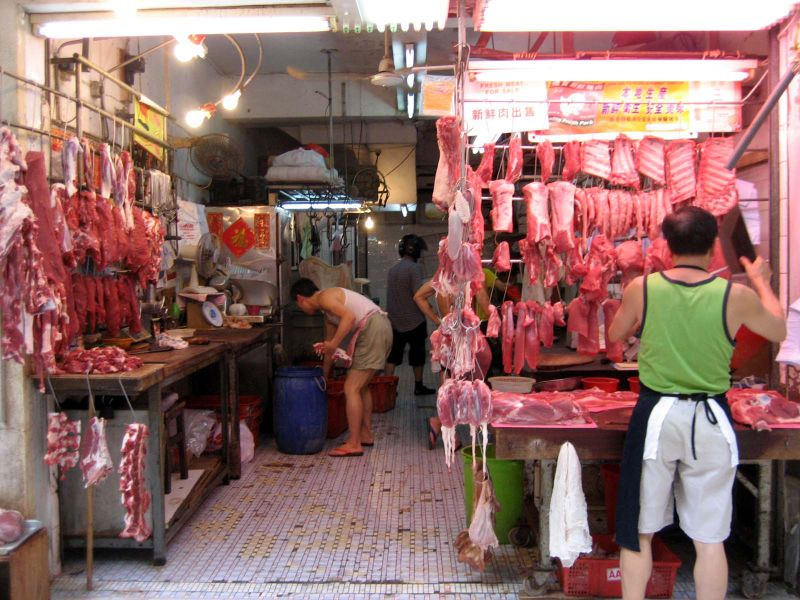
Wet market in Hong Kong

Flea market in Germany

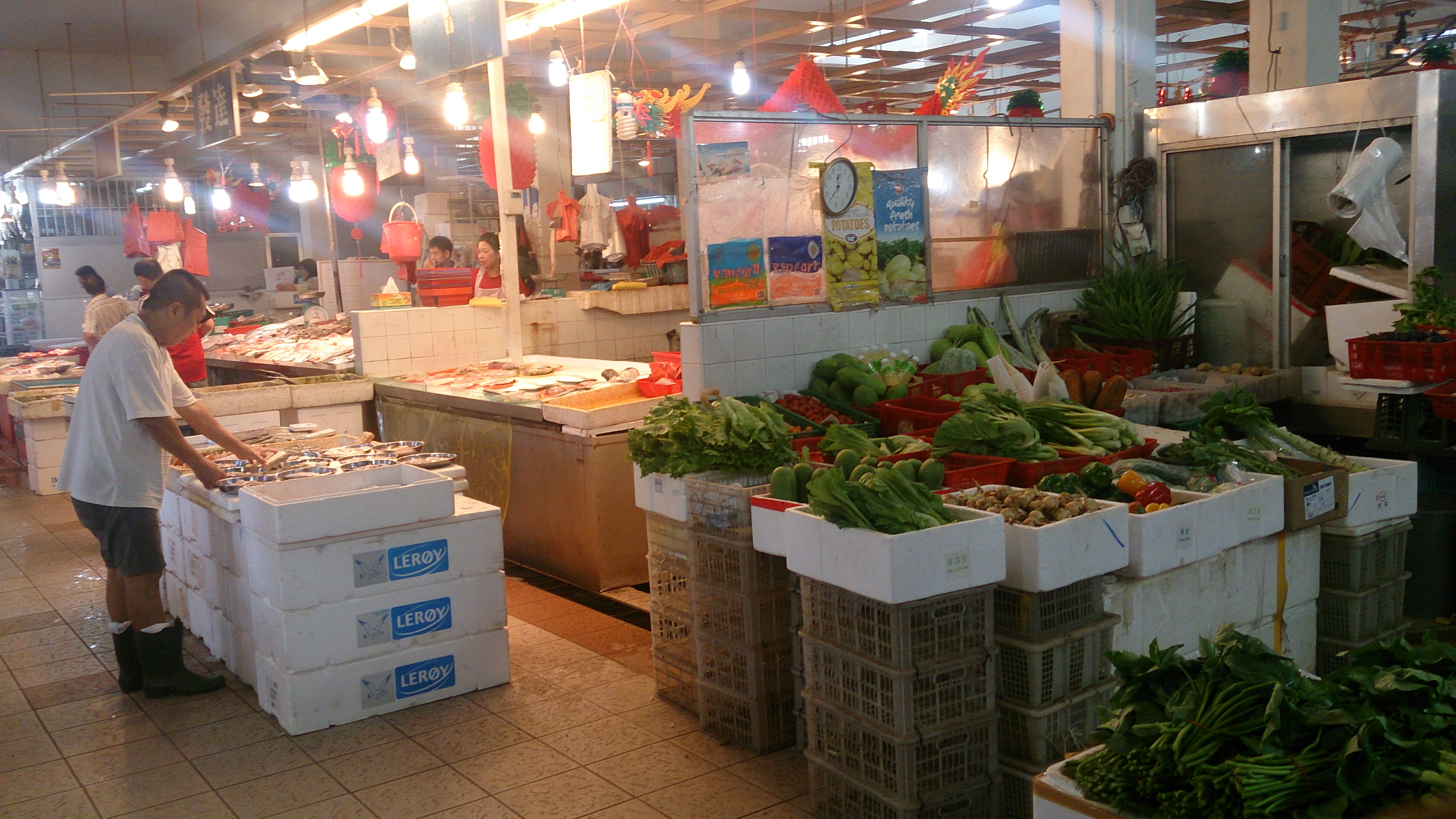
Wet market in Singapore

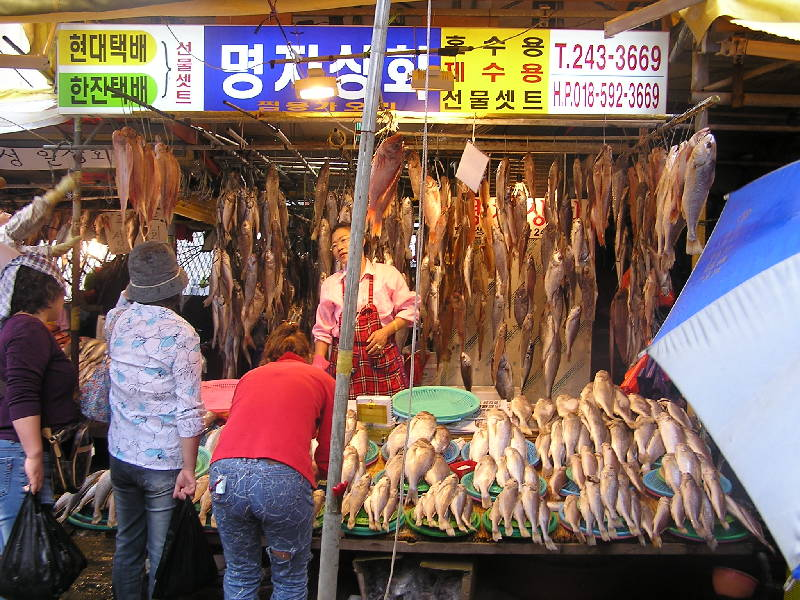
Fish market Jagalchi Busan

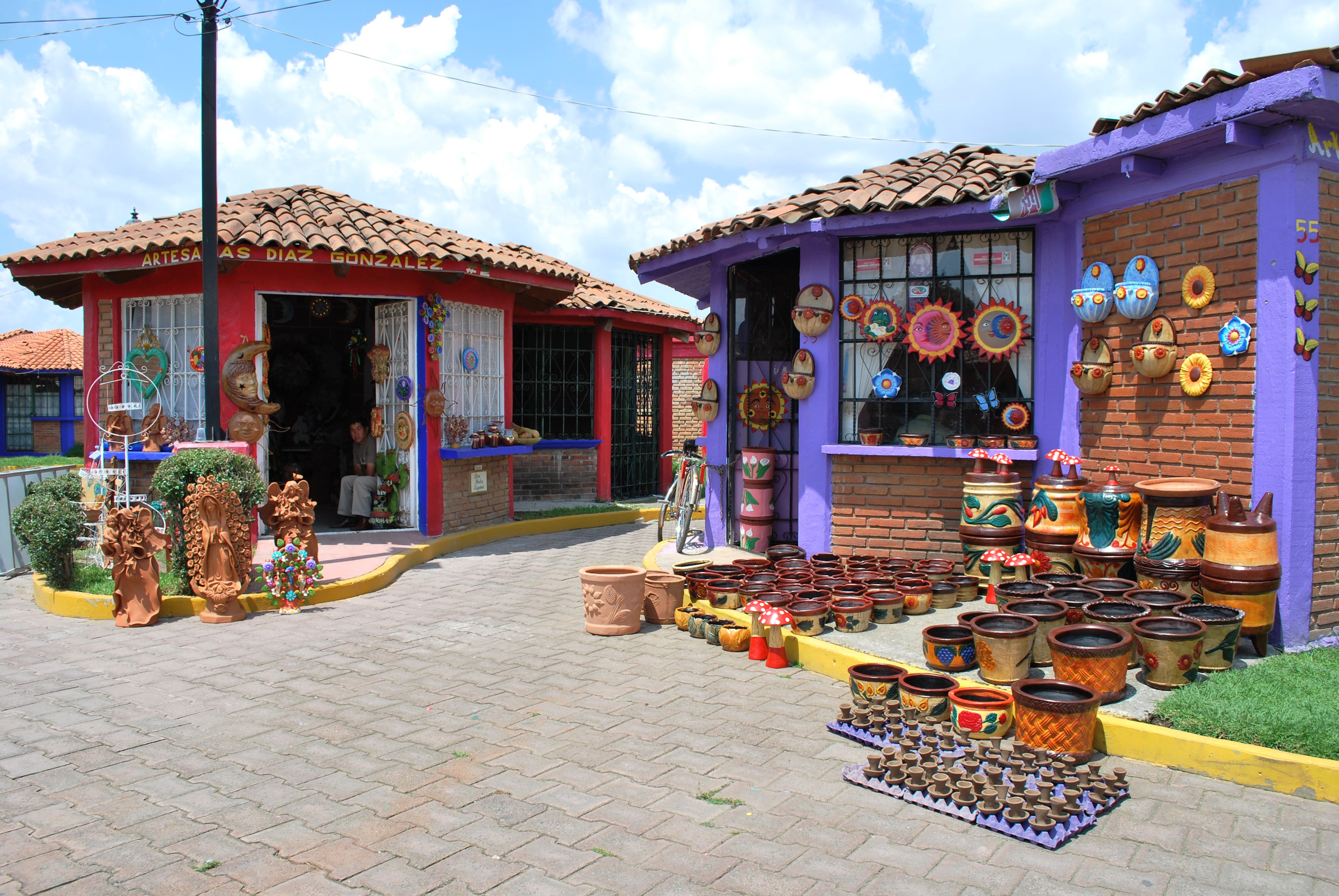
Crafts Village Market, Mexico

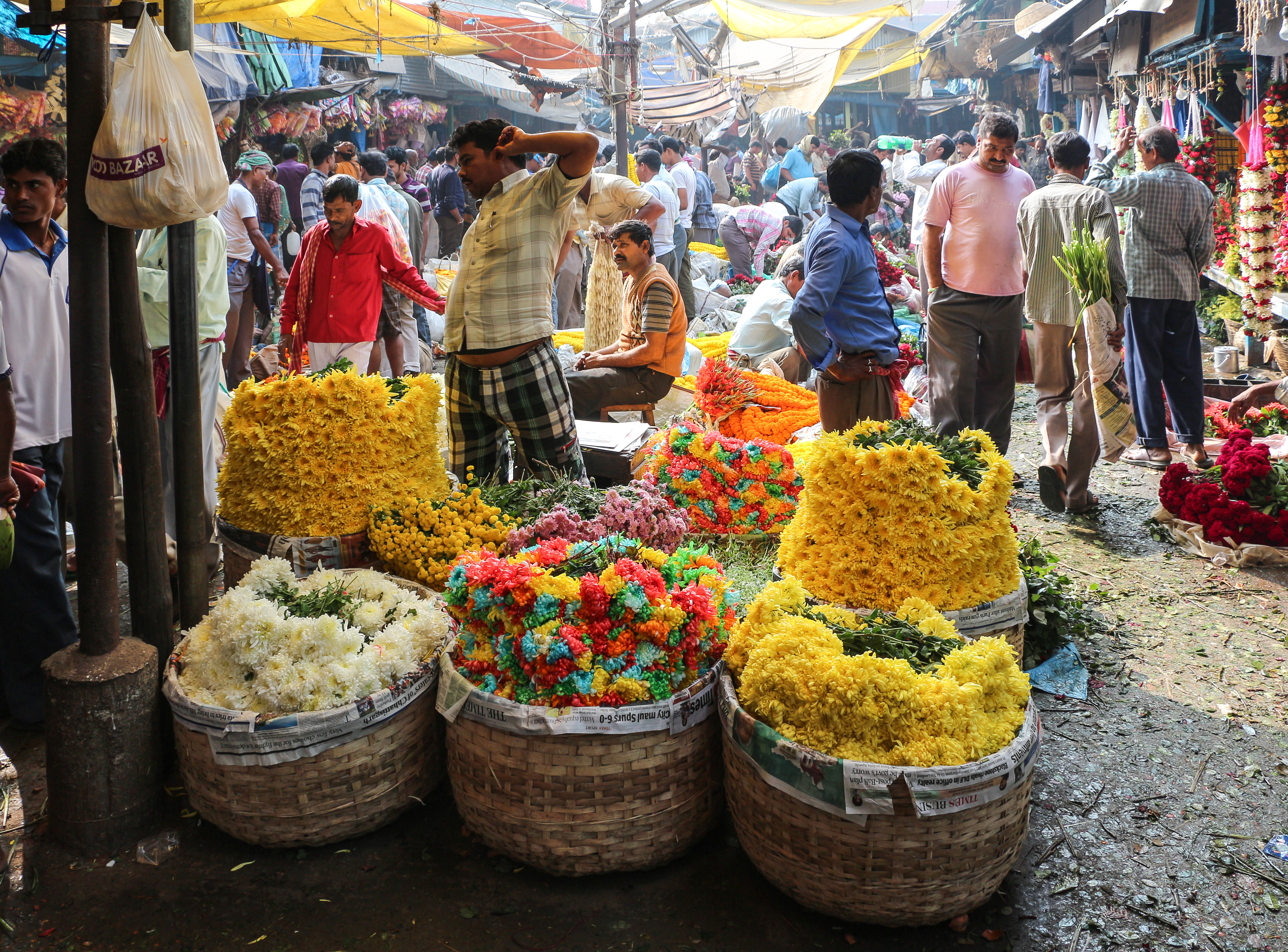
Mallick Ghat Flower Market, Kolkata, India

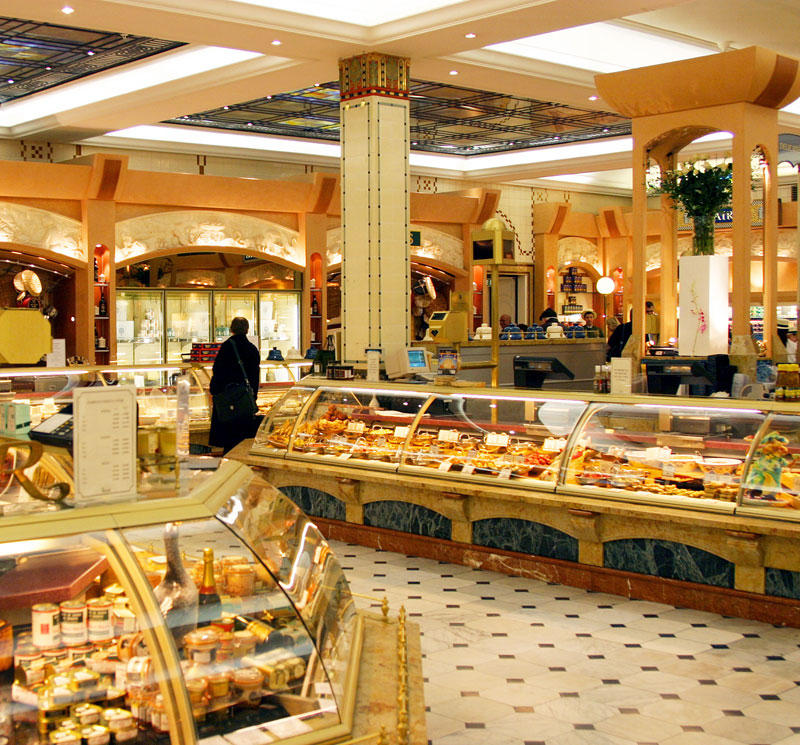
Harrods Food Hall, London, England

== In literature and art ==
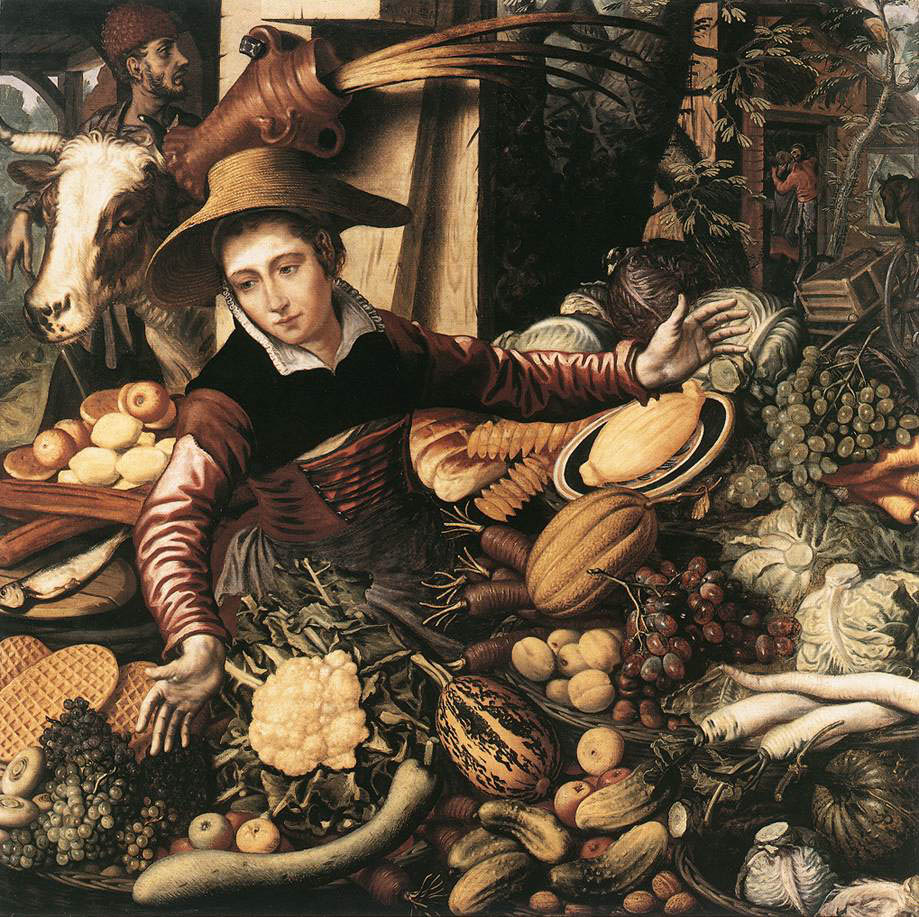
Vegetable seller at the market place by Pieter Aertsen, 1567

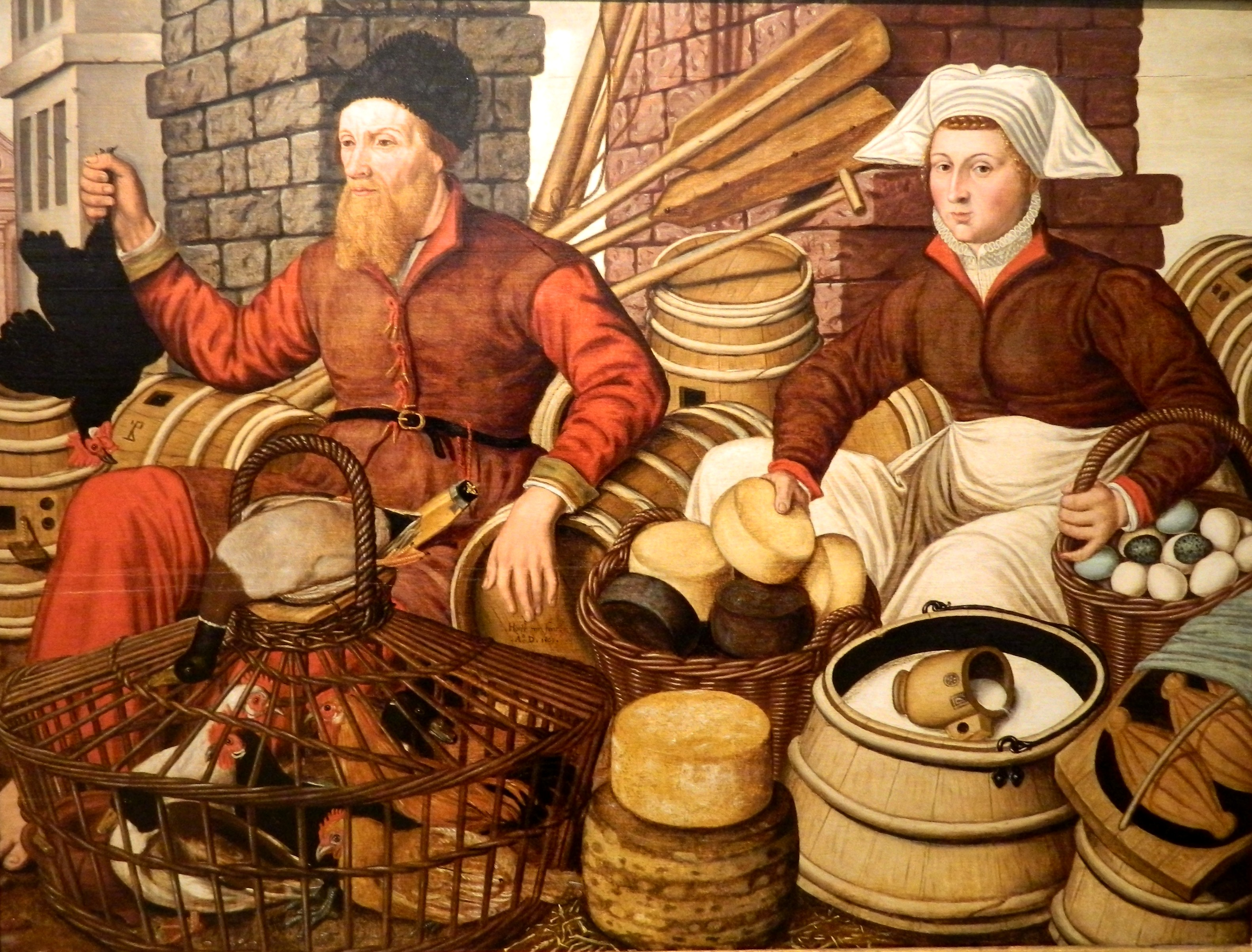
Market scene by Jan van Horst (1569)

Markets generally have featured prominently in artworks, especially amongst the Dutch painters of Antwerp from the middle of the 16th century. Pieter Aertsen was known as the "great painter of the market". Both he and his nephew, Joachim Beuckelaer, painted market scenes, street vendors and merchants extensively. Elizabeth Honig argues that painters' interest in markets was in part due to the changing nature of the market system at that time. The public began to distinguish between two types of merchant, the meerseniers which referred to local merchants including bakers, grocers, sellers of dairy products and stall-holders, and the koopman, which described a new, emergent class of trader who dealt in goods or credit on a large scale. With the rise of a European merchant class, this distinction was necessary to separate the daily trade that the general population understood from the rising ranks of traders who operated on a world stage and were seen as quite distant from everyday experience.

During the 17th and 18th centuries, as Europeans conquered parts of North Africa and the Levant, European artists began to visit the Orient and painted scenes of everyday life. Europeans sharply divided peoples into two broad groups – the European West and the East or Orient; us and the other. Europeans often saw Orientals as the photographic negative of Western civilisation; the peoples could be threatening – they were "despotic, static and irrational whereas Europe was viewed as democratic, dynamic and rational". At the same time, the Orient was seen as exotic, mysterious, a place of fables and beauty. This fascination with the other gave rise to a genre of painting known as Orientalism. Artists focussed on the exotic beauty of the land – the markets and bazaars, caravans and snake charmers. Islamic architecture also became favourite subject matter, and the high vaulted market places features in numerous paintings and sketches.

Individual markets have also attracted literary attention. Les Halles was known as the "Belly of Paris", and was so named by author, Émile Zola in his novel Le Ventre de Paris, which is set in the busy 19th century marketplace of central Paris. Les Halles, a complex of market pavilions in Paris, features extensively in both literature and painting. Giuseppe Canella (1788 - 1847) painted Les Halles et la rue de la Tonnellerie. Photographer, Henri Lemoine (1848–1924), also photographed Les Halles de Paris.

== Around the world ==
=== Africa ===
Markets have been known in parts of Africa for centuries. An 18th-century commentator noted the many markets he visited in West Africa. He provided a detailed description of market activities at Sabi, in the Wydah (now the part of the Republic of Benin):

Their fairs and markets are regulated with so much care and prudence, that nothing contrary to law is ever committed. All sorts of merchandise here are collected, and those who have brought goods are permitted to take what time they please to dispose of them, but without fraud or noise. A judge, attended by four officers armed, is appointed by the King for the inspection of goods, to hear and determine all grievances, complaints and disputes ... The market place is surrounded by butlers and booths, and places of refreshment for the conveniency of the people. They are only permitted to sell certain sorts of meats, pork, goats, beef and dog flesh. Other booths are kept by women who sell maize, millet, rice and corn bread. Other shops sell Pito, a sort of pleasant and wholesome, and very refreshing beer. Palm wine, acqua vita and spirits which they get from the Europeans, are kept in other shops, with restrictions on sale to prevent drunkenness and riots. Here slaves of both sexes are bought and sold, also oxen, sheep, dogs, hogs, shish and birds of all kind. Woollen cloths, linen, silks and calicoes of European and Indian manufacture, they have it in great abundance, likewise hard-ware, china and glass of all sorts; gold in dust and ingots, iron in bars, lead in sheets and everything of European, Asiatic or African production is here found at reasonable prices.

In the Kingdom of Benin (modern Benin City), he commented on the exotic foods available for sale at a market there:

Besides the dry merchandise of which the markets of Benin abound, they are also well stocked with eatables, a little particular in kind. Here they expose dogs to sale for eating, of which the negroes are very fond. Roasted monkeys, apes and baboons are every where to be seen. Bats, rats and lizards dried in the sun, palm wine and fruit, form the must luxurious entertainments, and stand continually for sale in the streets.

==== Botswana ====
In Botswana, the sale of agricultural produce to the formal market is largely controlled by large corporations. Most small, local farmers sell their produce to the informal market, local communities and street vendors. The main wholesale market is the Horticultural market in Gaborone. The government made some attempts to build markets in the north of the country, but that was largely unsuccessful and most commercial buyers travel to Johannesburg or Tshwane for supplies.

==== Ethiopia ====
Ethiopia is a major producer and exporter of grains and a number of wholesale markets assist with the distribution and export of such products. Important wholesale markets include: Nekemte in the East Welega zone, Jimma in the Jimma zone, Assela and Sagure in the Arsi zone, Bahir Dar and Bure in the Gojjam zone, Dessie and Kombolcha in the Wollo zone, Mekele in the Tigray region, Dire Dawa and Harar in the Oromia region, and Addis Ababa. Some of the major retail markets in Ethiopia include: Addis Mercato in Addis Ababa, the largest open air market in the country; Gulalle and Galan, both in Addis Ababa; Awasa Lake Fish Market in Awasa, the Saturday market Harar, and the Saturday market in Axum.

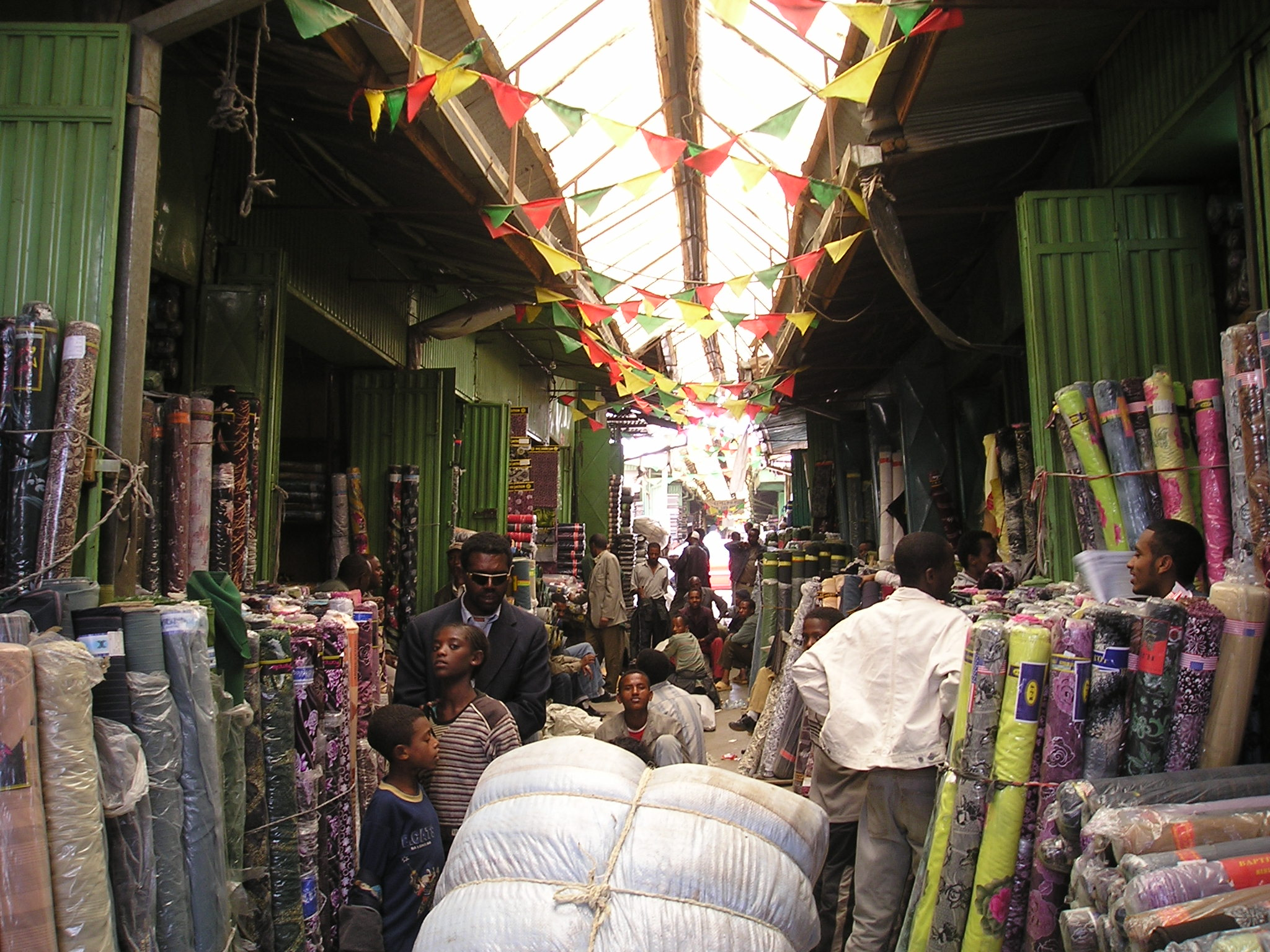
Addis Mercato, Addis Ababa, Ethiopia

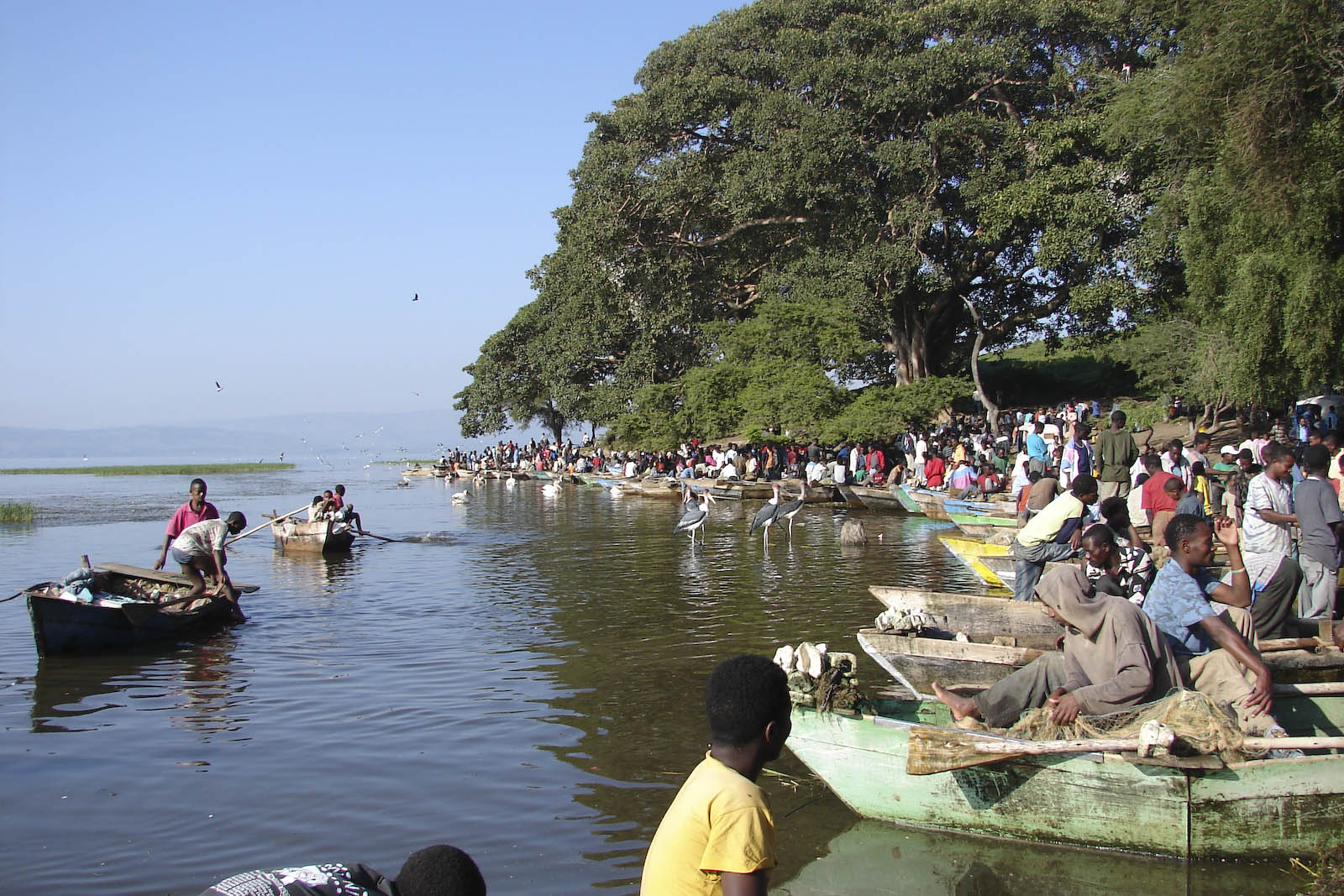
Awasa fish market, Awasa, Ethiopia

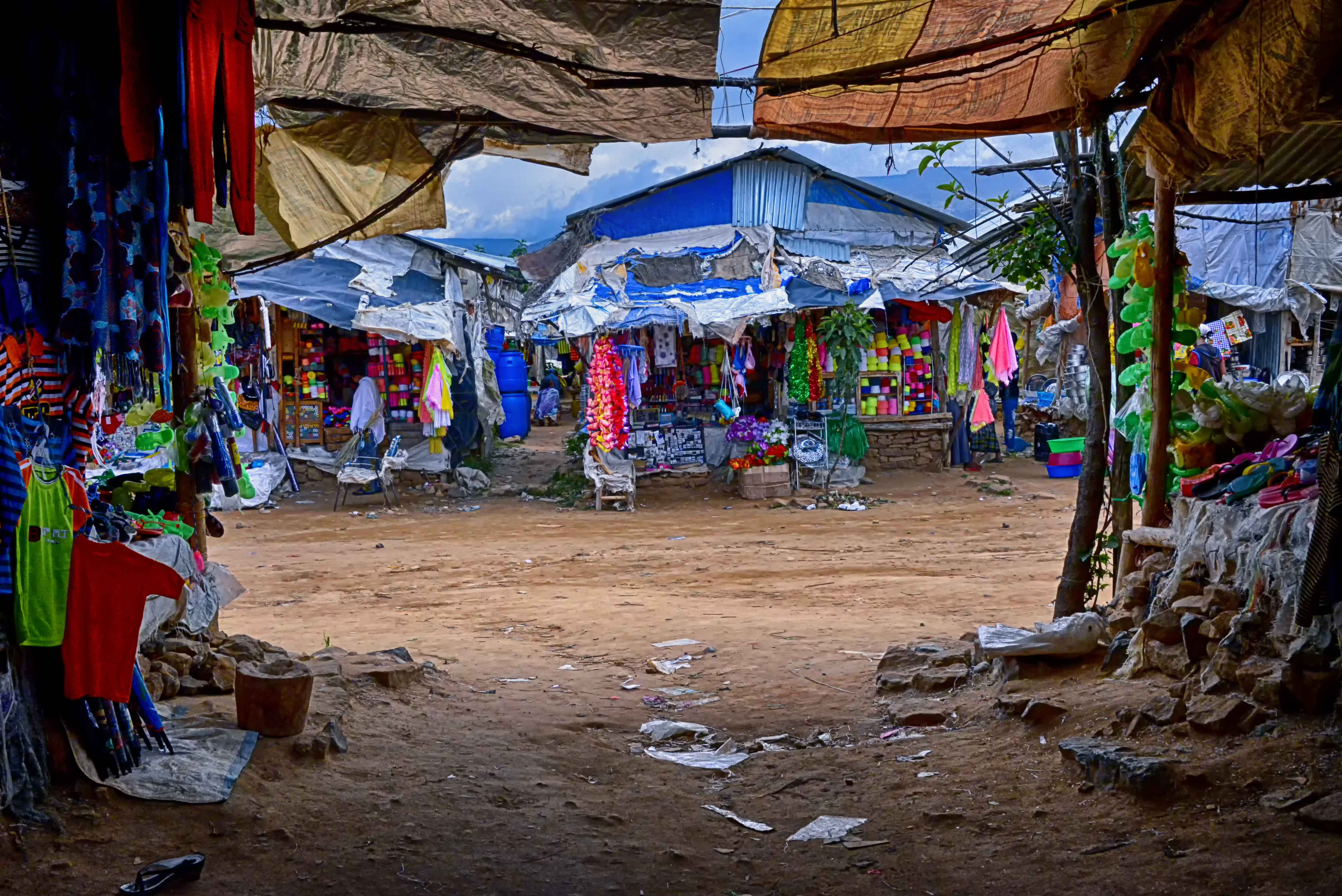
Adigrat Market, Ethiopia

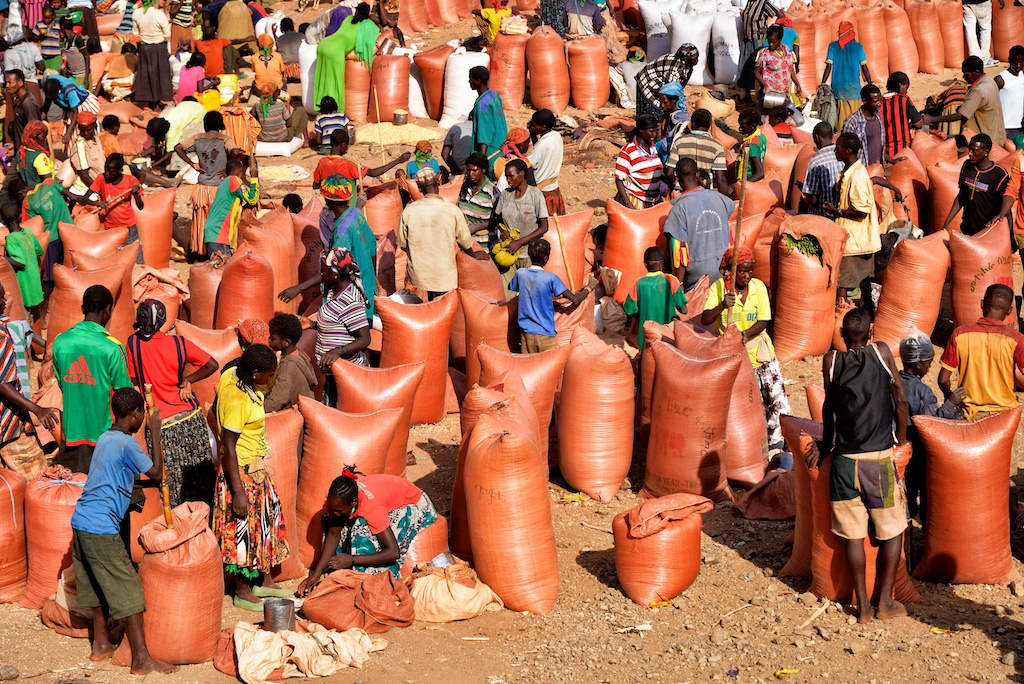
Konso Sorghum Market, Ethiopia

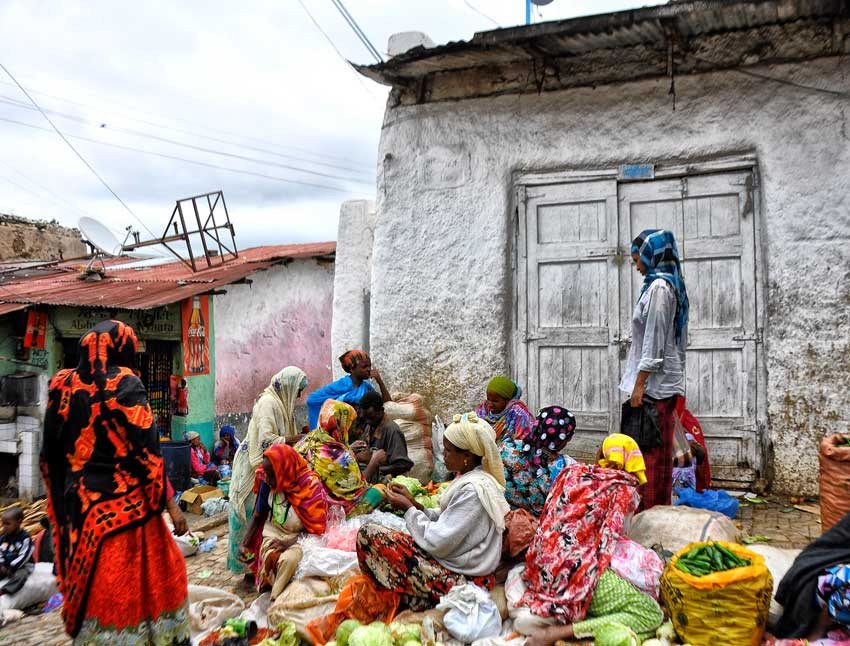
Street Market, Harar, Ethiopia

==== Ghana ====
Ghanaian markets have survived in spite of sometimes brutal measures to eradicate them. In the late 1970s, the Ghanaian government used market traders as a scapegoat for its own policy failures which involved food shortages and high inflation. The government blamed traders for failing to observe pricing guidelines and vilified "women merchants". In 1979, the Makola market was dynamited and bulldozed, but within a week the traders were back selling fruit, vegetables and fish, albeit without a roof over their head.

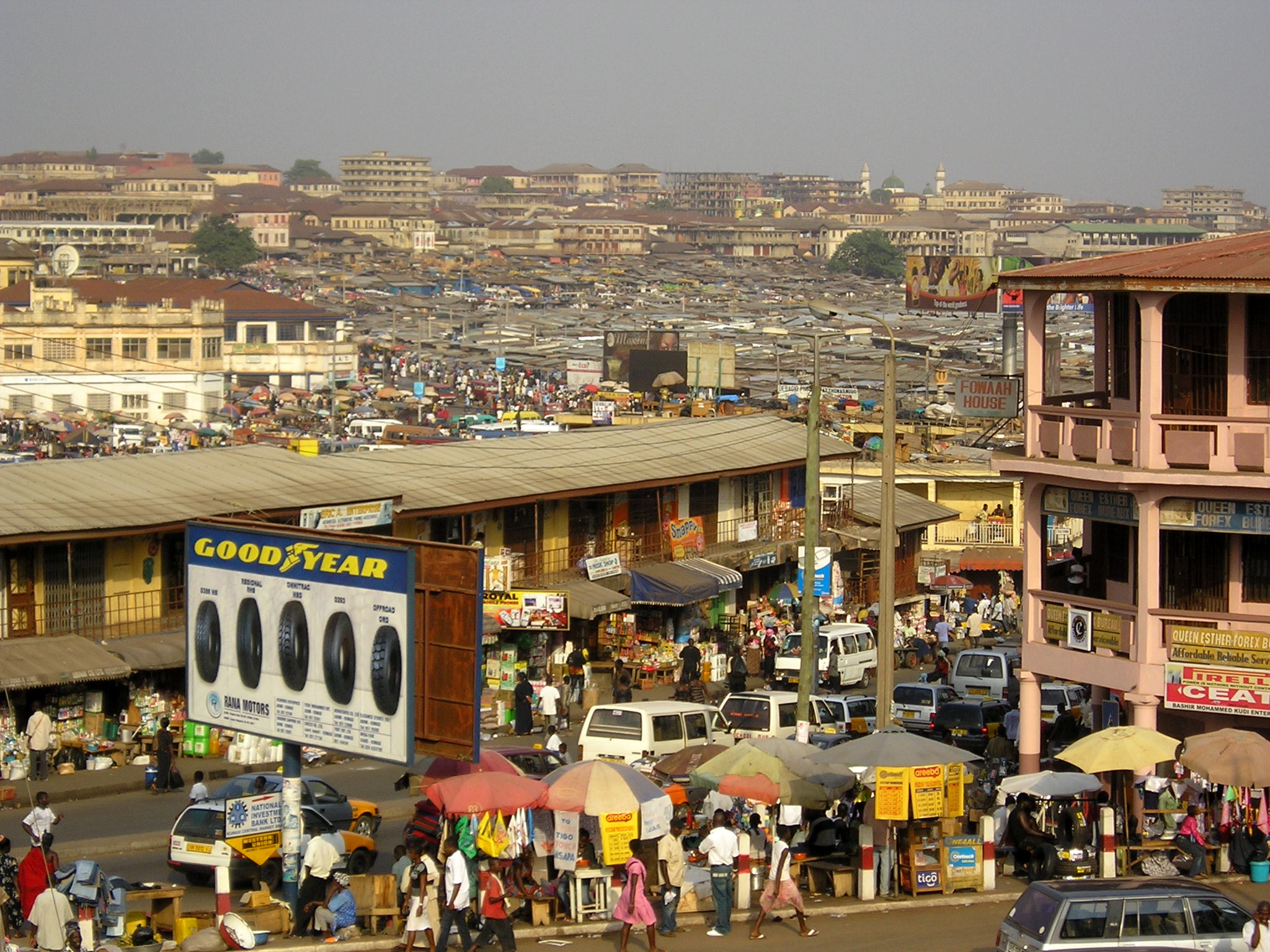
Kumasi Market in Ghana

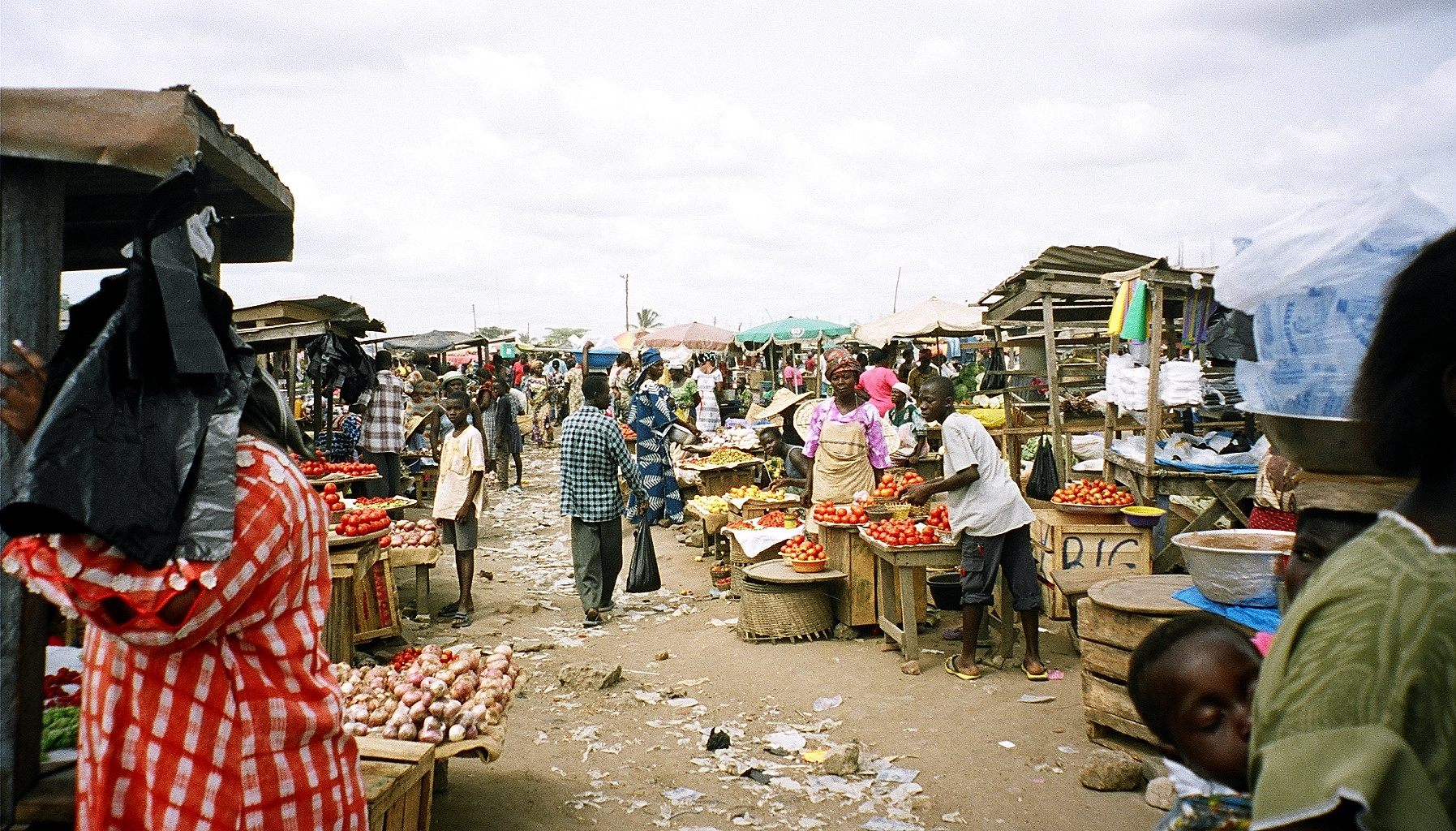
Market between Accra and Cape Coast, Ghana

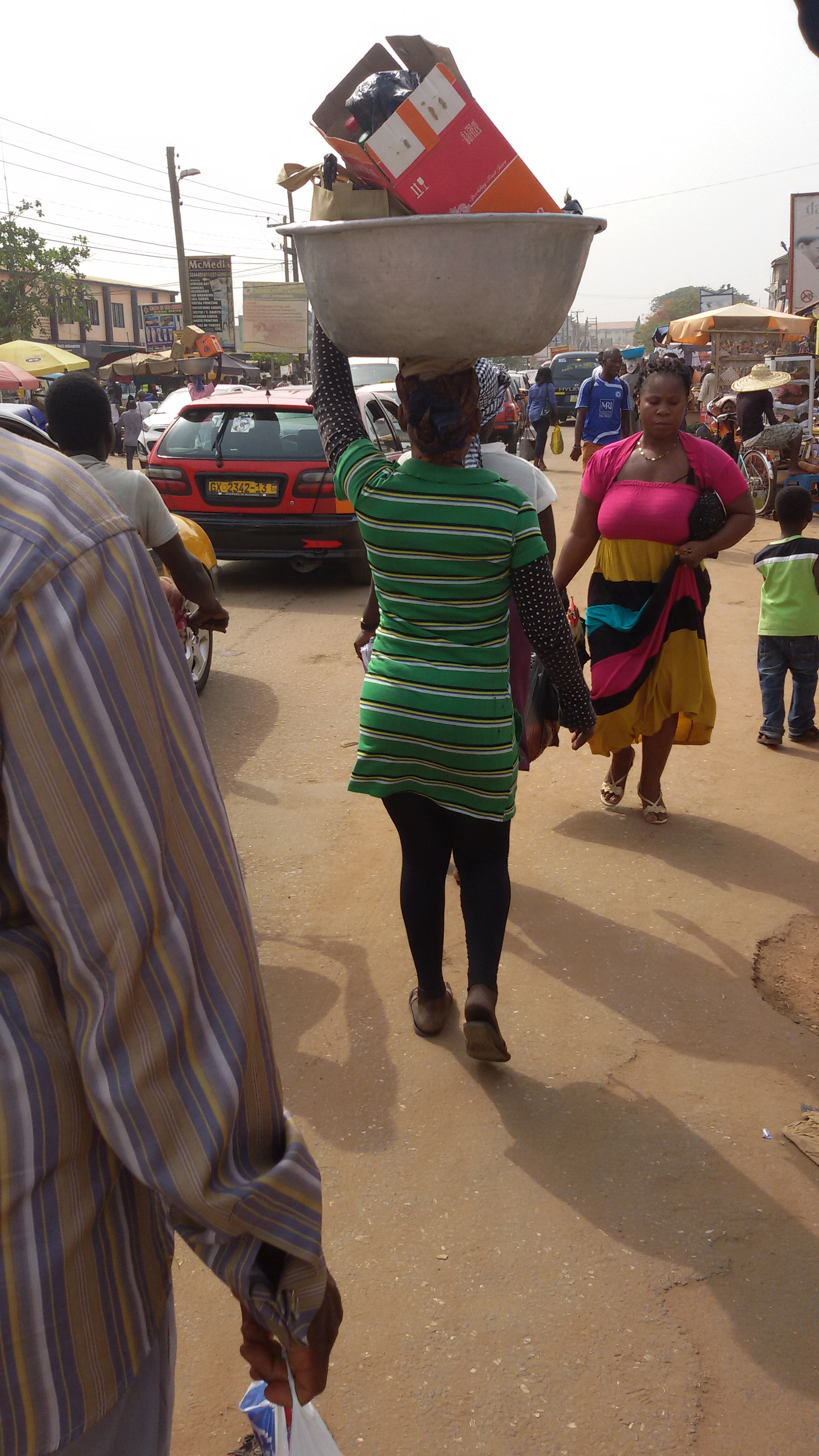
Madina Ghana Market

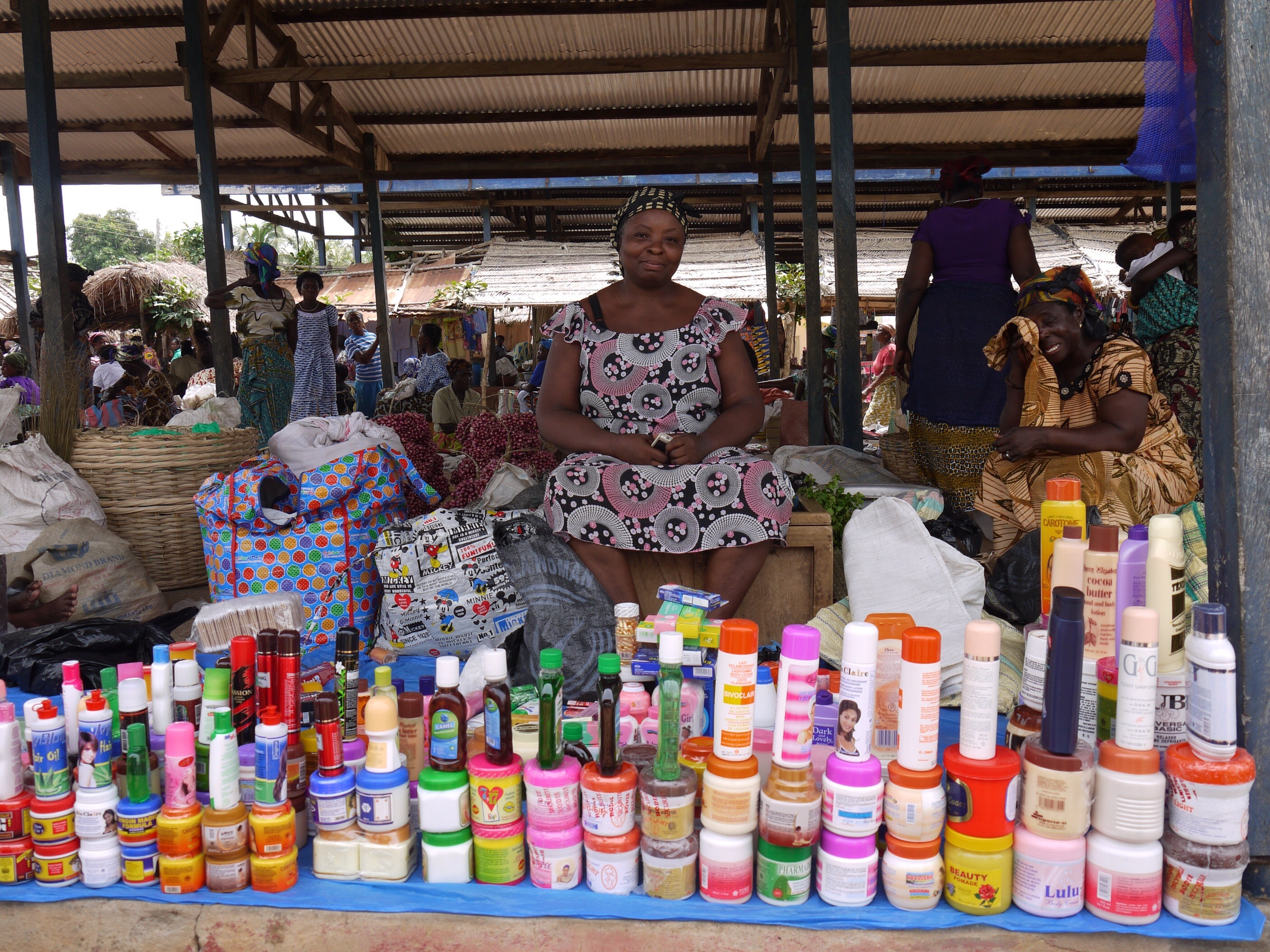
Market in Anaynui, Ghana

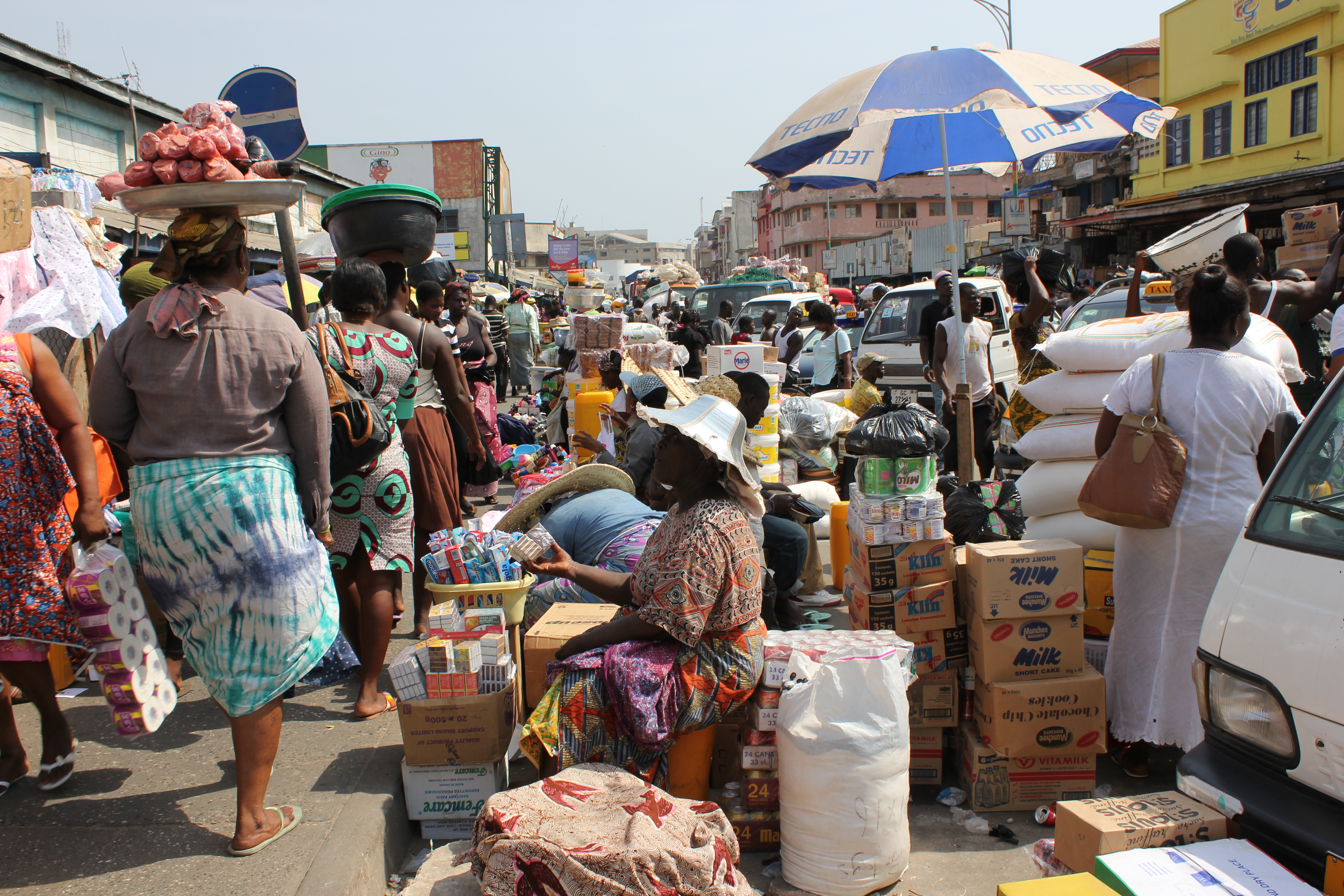
Street Outside Makola Market, Accra, Ghana

==== Kenya ====
Kenya's capital, Nairobi, has several major markets. Wakulima market is one of the region's largest markets, situated on Haile Selassie Avenue in Nairobi. Other markets in Nairobi are: Kariakor Market, Gikomba Market, and Muthurwa Market. In Mombasa, Kongowea market is also a very large market with over 1500 stalls and covering 4.5 ha.

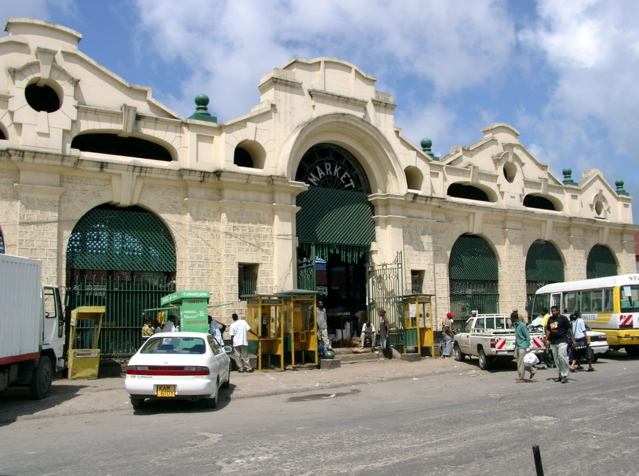
Mombasa Market

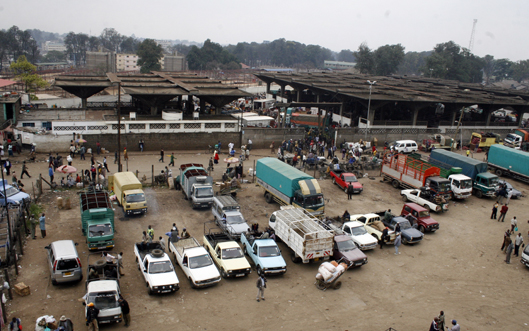
Wakulima market, Nairobi

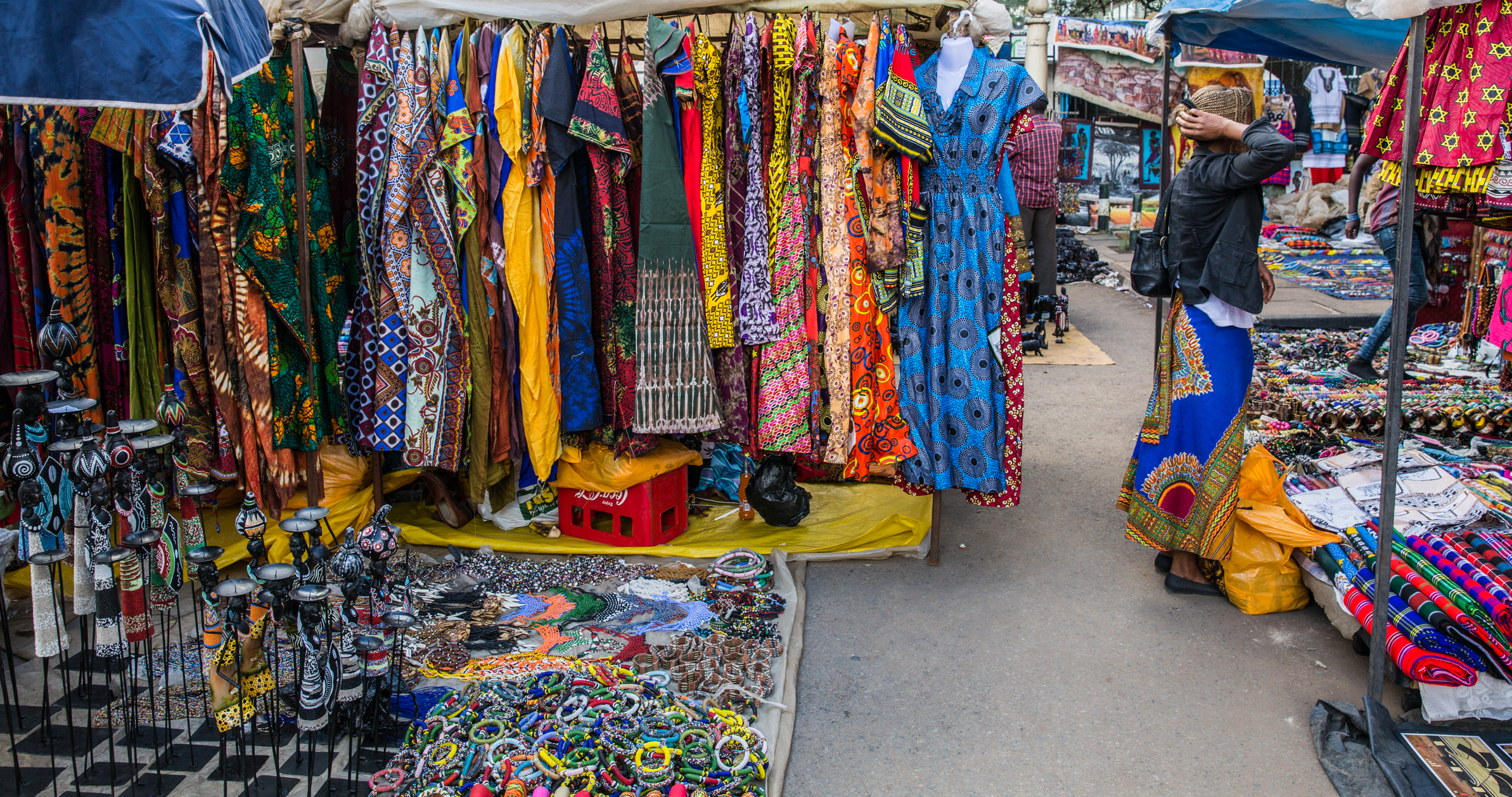
Masai Market, Nairobi

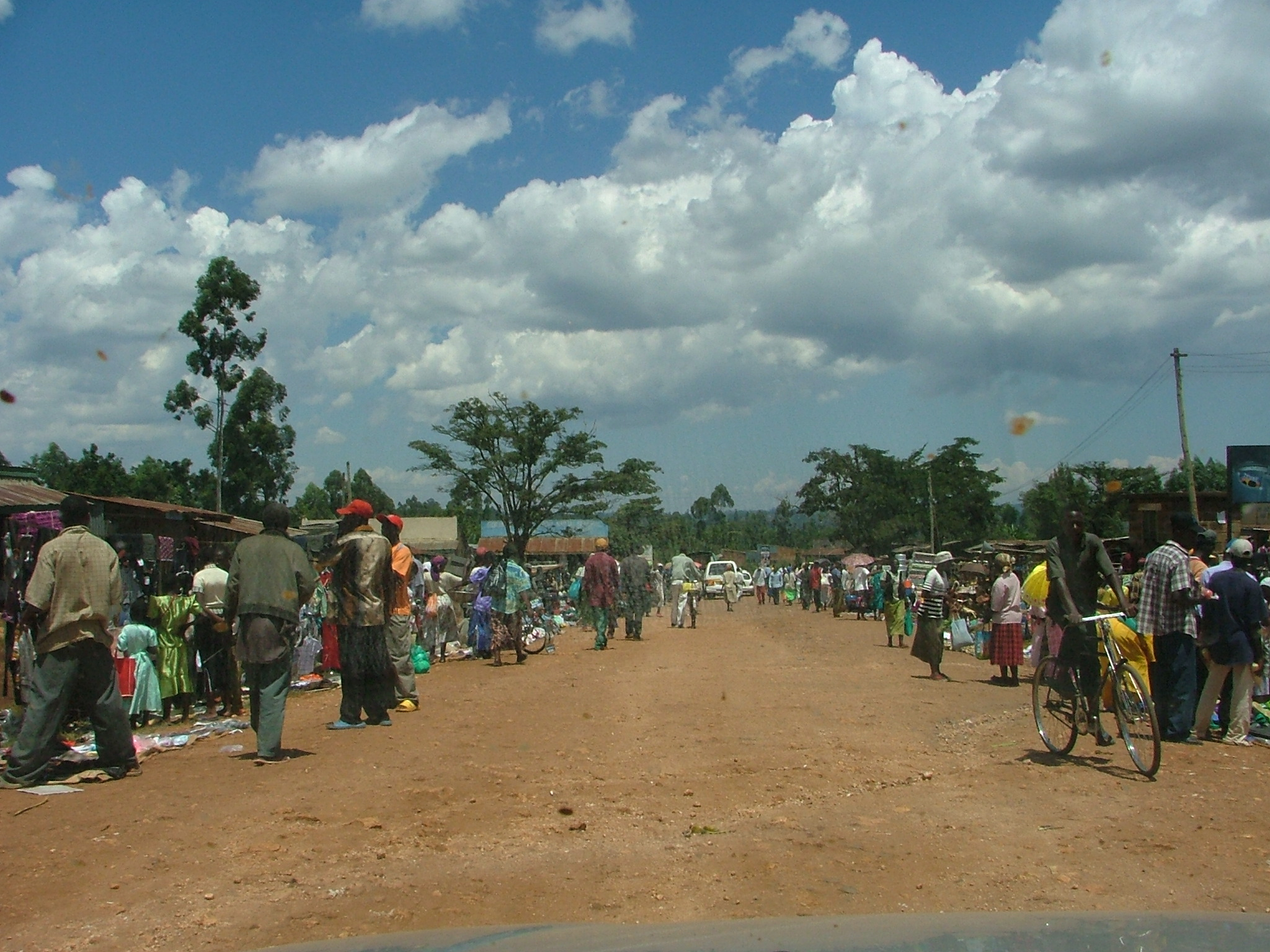
Kilingili Market

==== Morocco ====
In Morocco, markets are known as souks, and are normally found in a city's Medina (old city or old quarter). Shopping at a produce market is a standard feature of daily life in Morocco. In the larger cities, Medinas are typically made up of a collection of souks built amid a maze of narrow streets and laneways where independent vendors and artisans tend to cluster in sections which subsequently become known for a particular type of produce – such as the silversmith's street or the textile district. In Tangiers, a sprawling market fills the many streets of the medina and this area is divided into two sections, known as the Grand Socco and the Petit Socco. The term socco is a Spanish corruption of the Arabic word for souk, meaning marketplace. These markets sell a large variety of goods: fresh produce, cooking equipment, pottery, silverware, rugs and carpets, leather goods, clothing, accessories, electronics, alongside cafes, restaurants and take-away food stalls. The medina at Fez is the oldest, having been founded in the 9th century. The medina at Fez has been named a UNESCO World Heritage site. Today it is the main fresh produce market and is noted for its narrow laneways and for a total ban on motorized traffic. All produce is brought in and out of the marketplace by donkey or hand-cart. In Marrakesh, the main produce markets are also to be found in the medina and a colourful market is also held daily in the Jemaa el-Fnaa (main square) where roaming performers and musicians entertain the large crowds that gather there. Marrakesh has the largest traditional Berber market in Morocco.

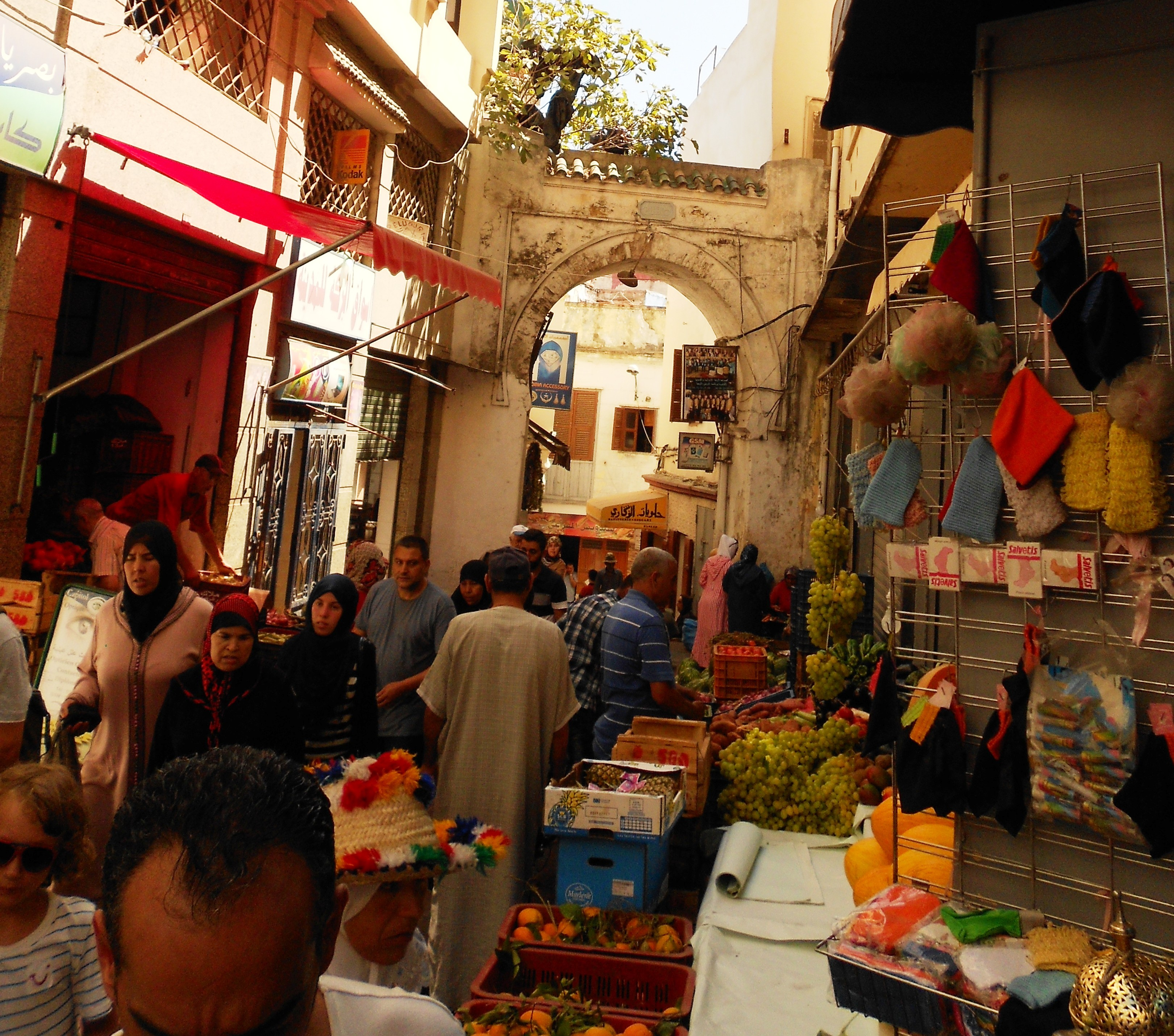
Market stalls in Tangiers' medina

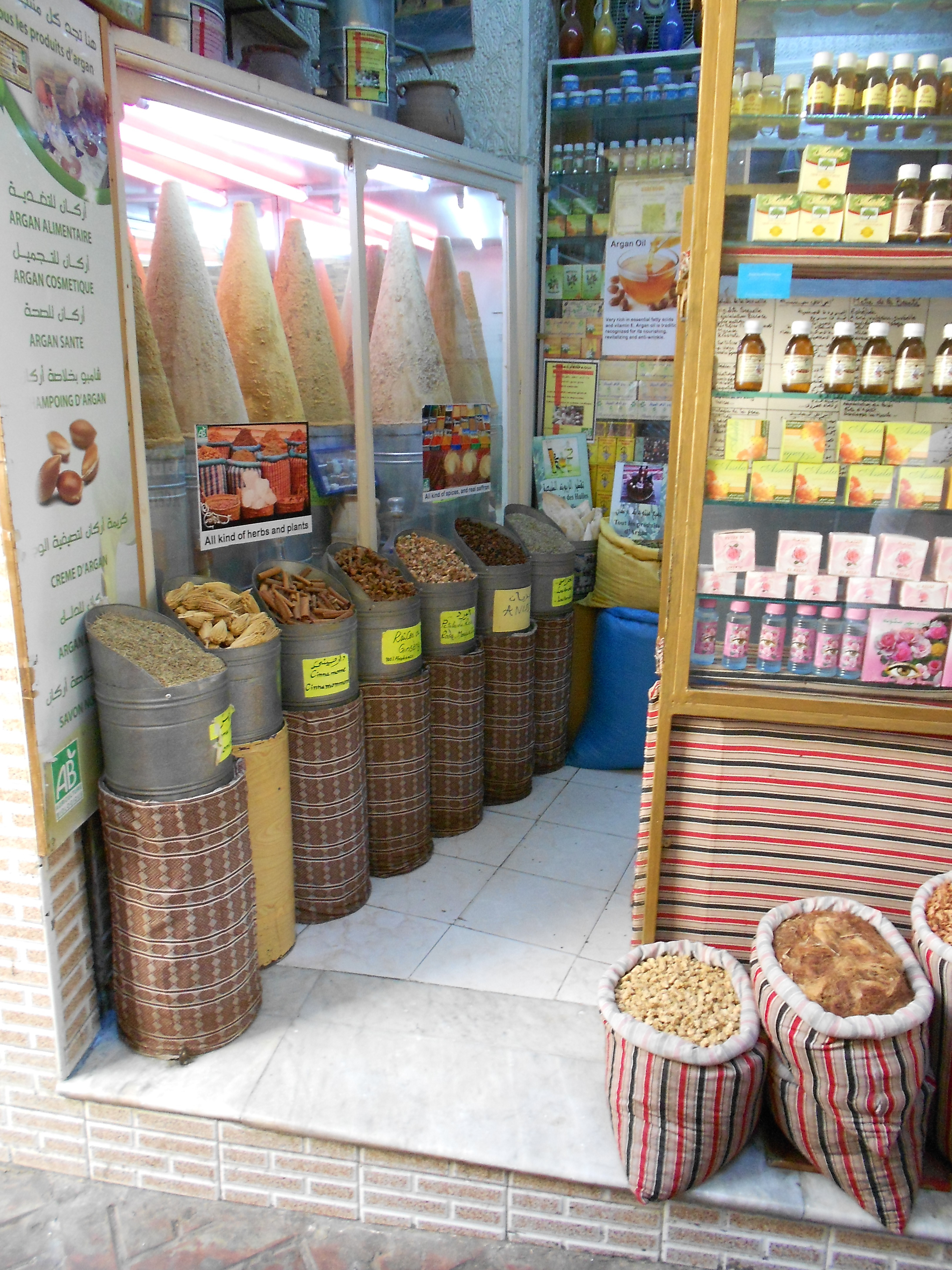
Spice shop in Tangiers' medina

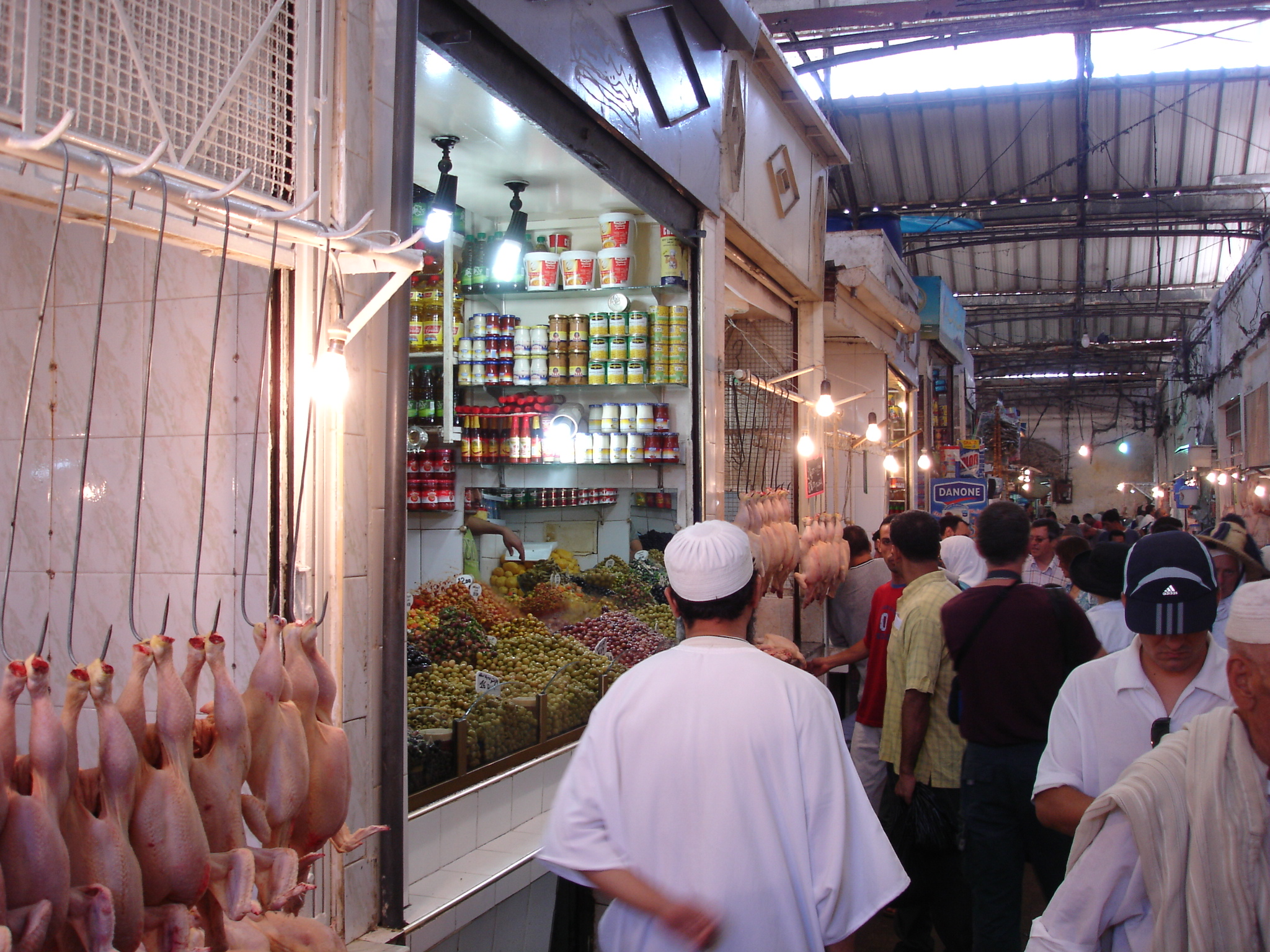
Market scene, Tangiers

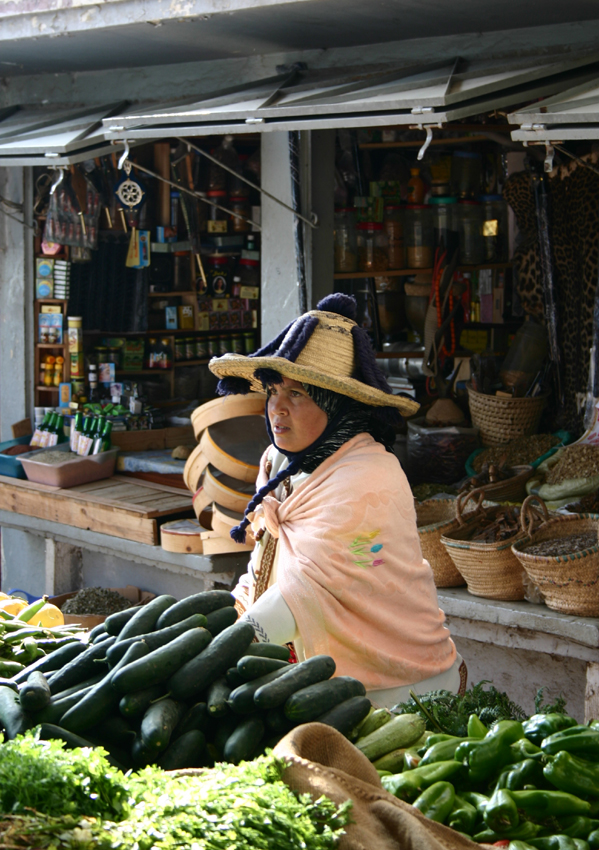
Berber woman selling produce at a Moroccan market

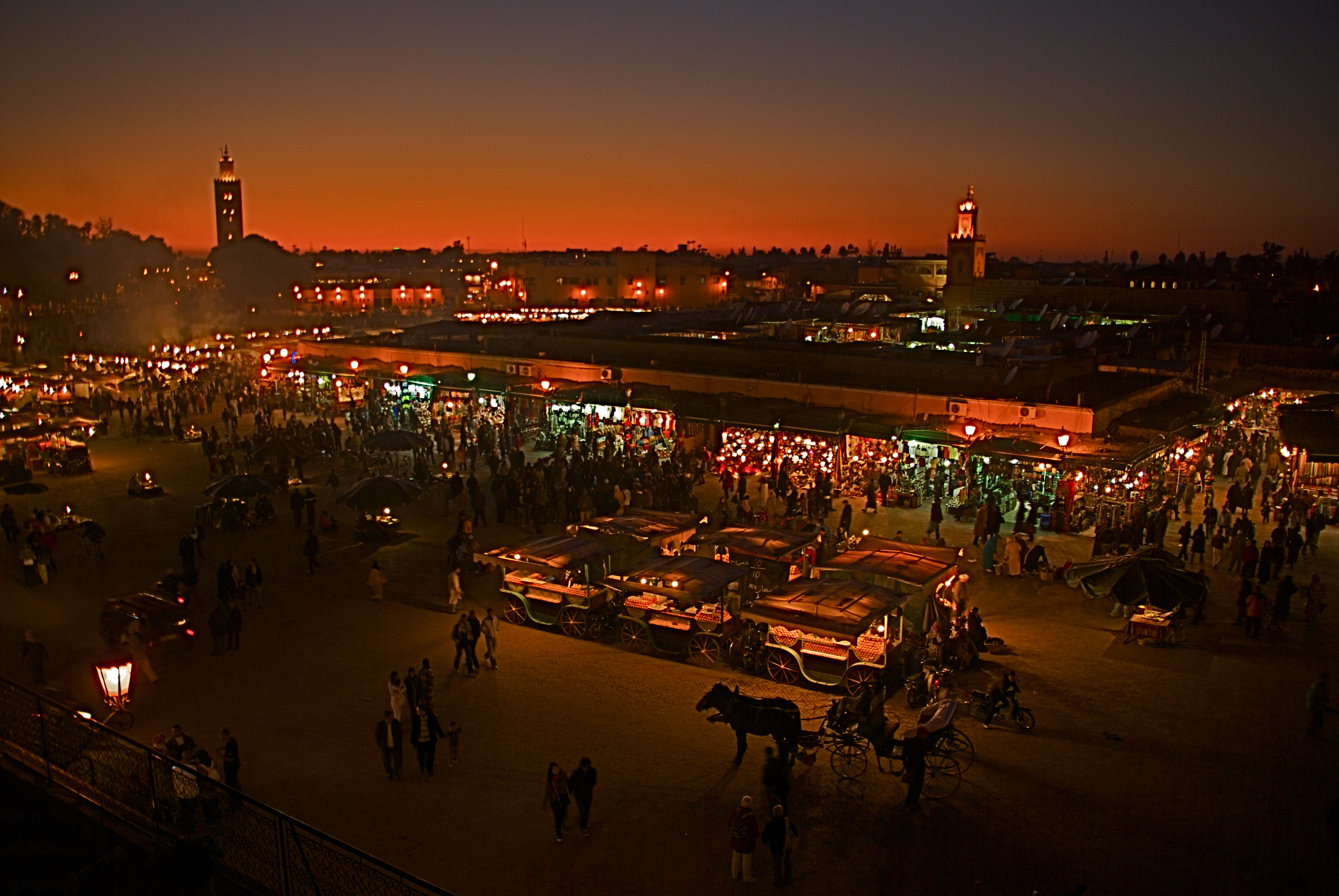
Jemaa el-Fnaa at night

==== Namibia ====
Namibia has been almost entirely dependent on South Africa for its fresh produce. Dominated by rolling plains and long sand dunes and an unpredictable rainfall, many parts of Namibia are unsuited to growing fruit and vegetables. Government sponsored initiatives have encouraged producers to grow fresh fruit, vegetables, legumes and grains The Namibian Ministry of Agriculture has recently launched a system of fresh produce hubs to serve as a platform for producers to market and distribute their produce. It is anticipated that these hubs will assist in curbing the number of sellers who take their produce to South Africa where it is placed on cold storage, only to be imported back into the country at a later date.

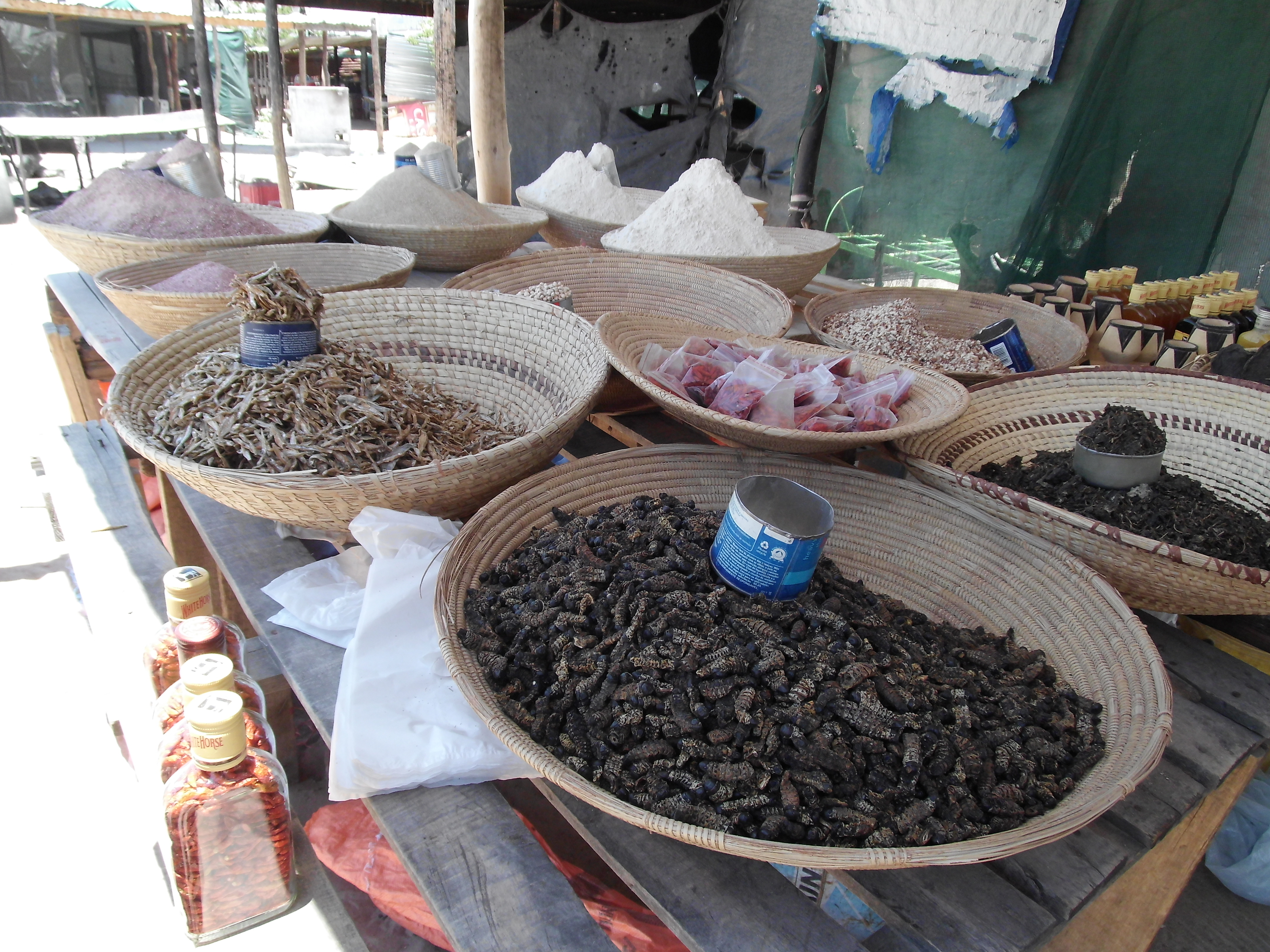
Market Scene Oshakati Namibia

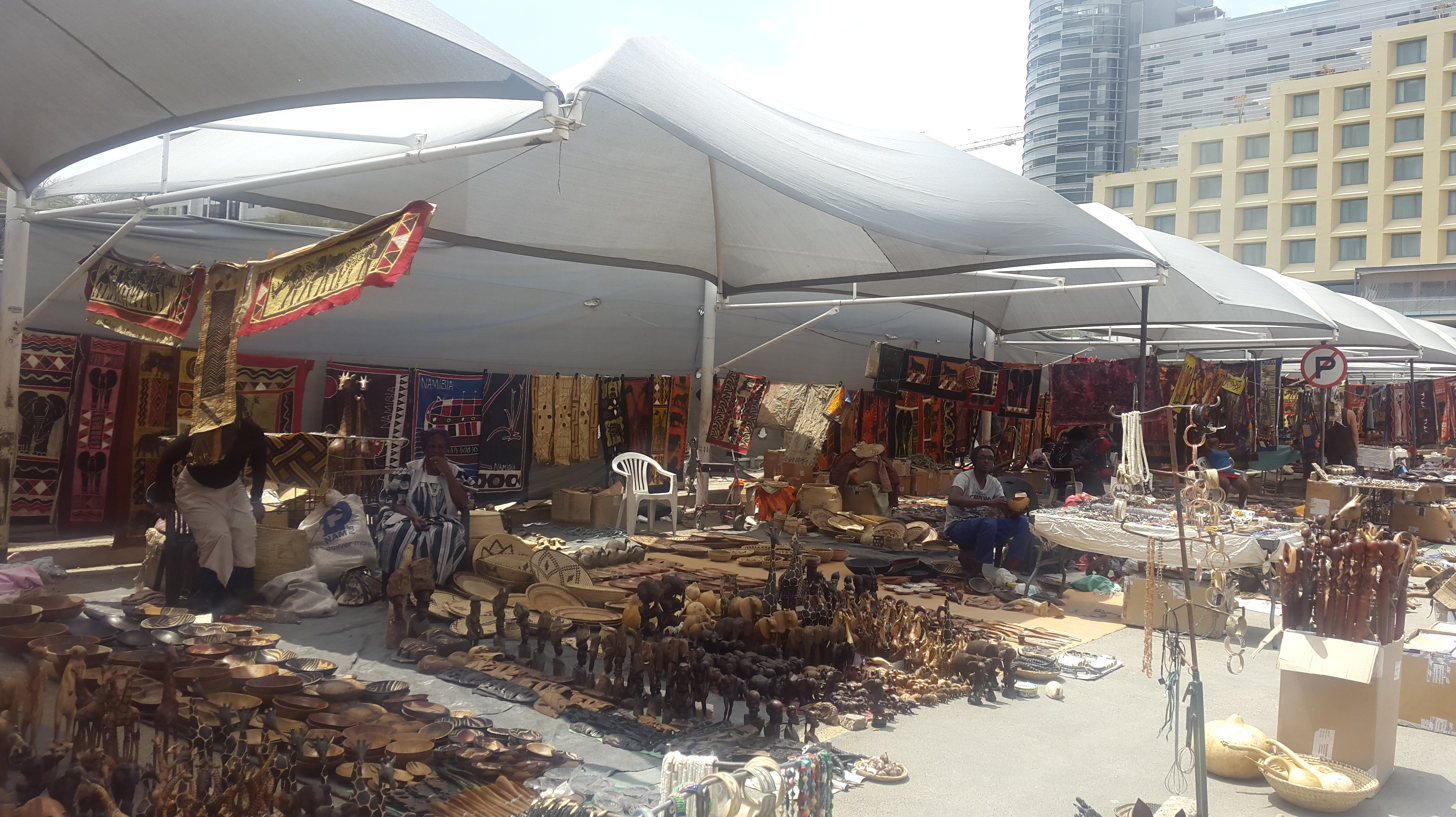
Street Market in Namibia, Windhoek

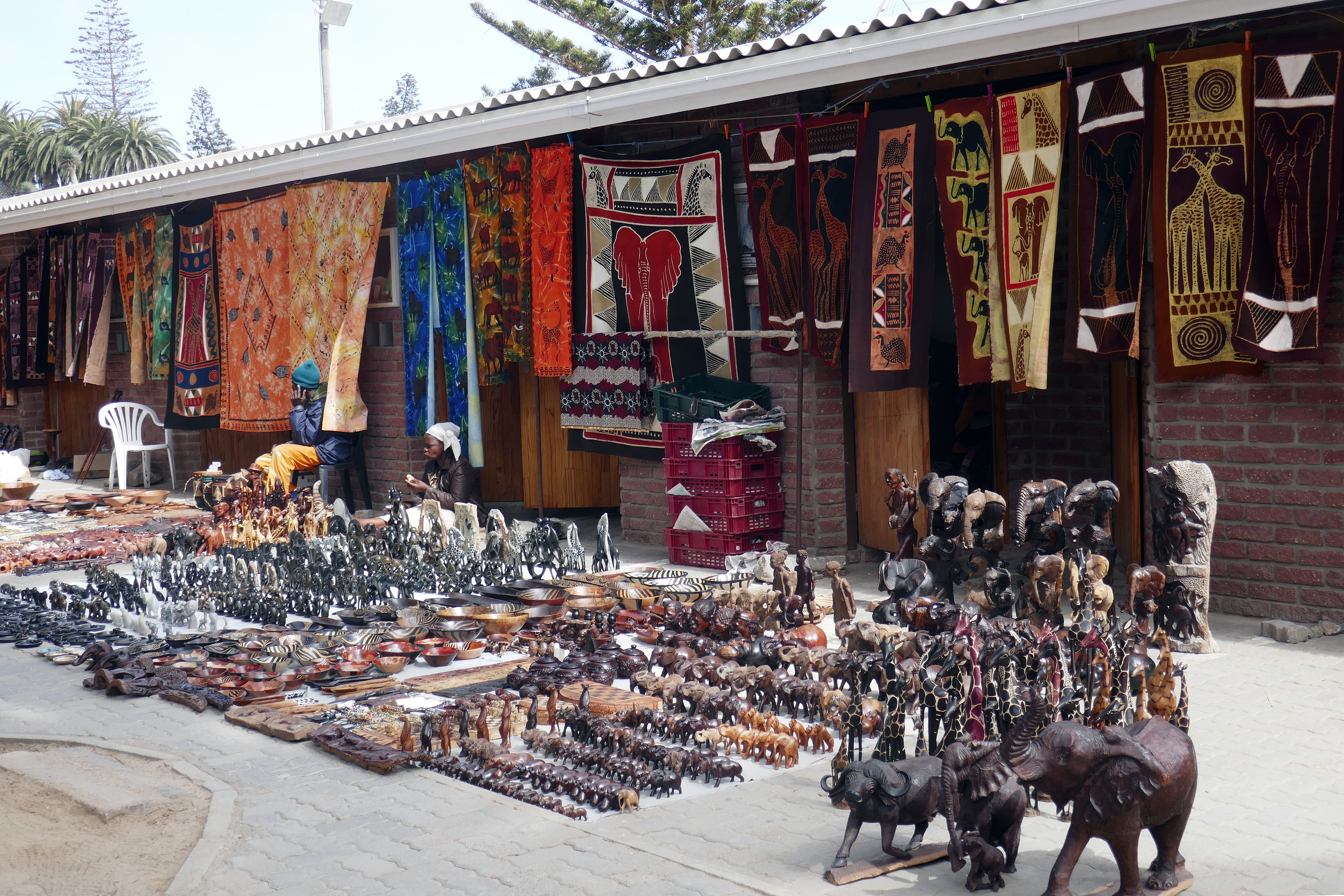
Artisans' Market, Swakopmund

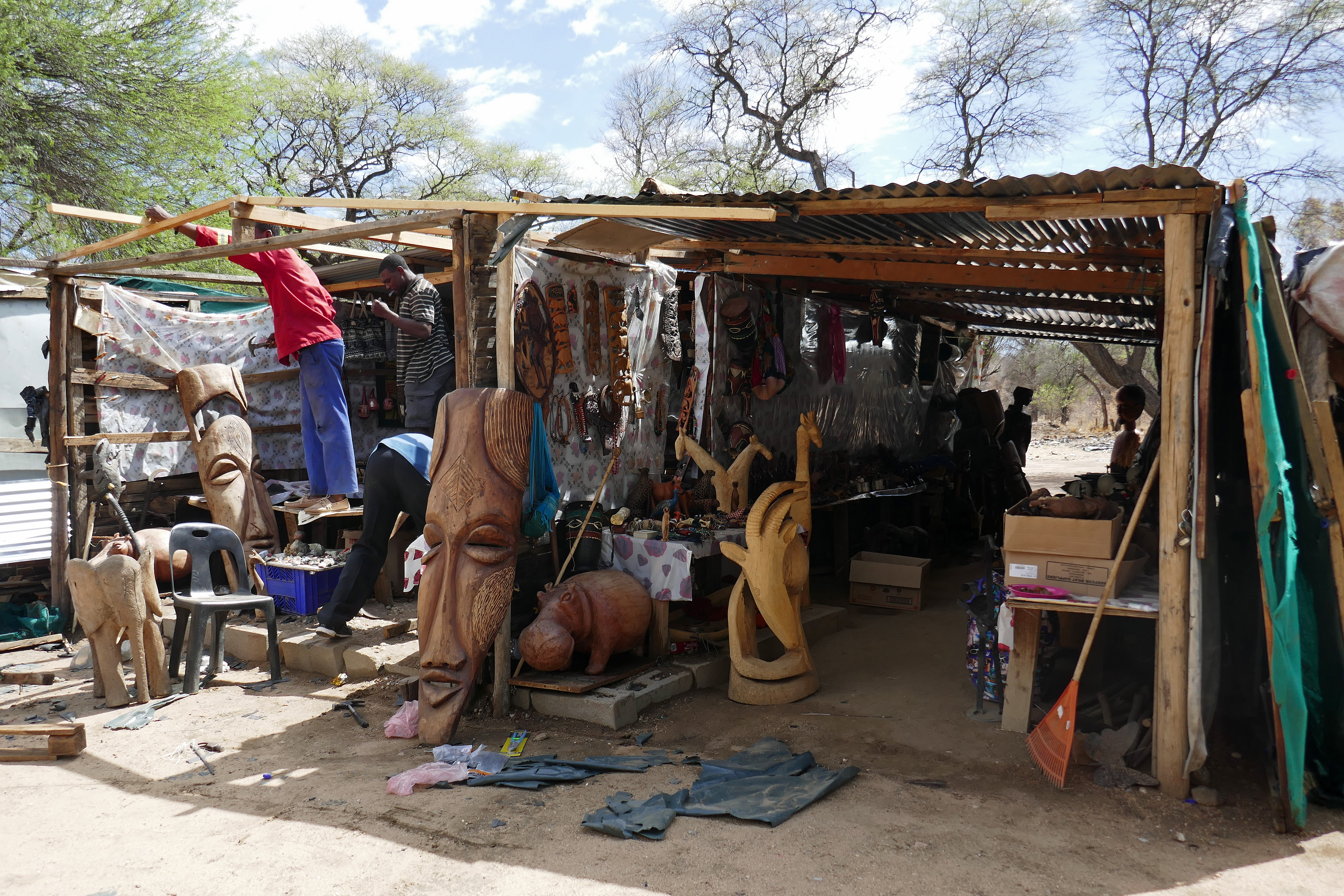
Artisan's market, d'Okahandja

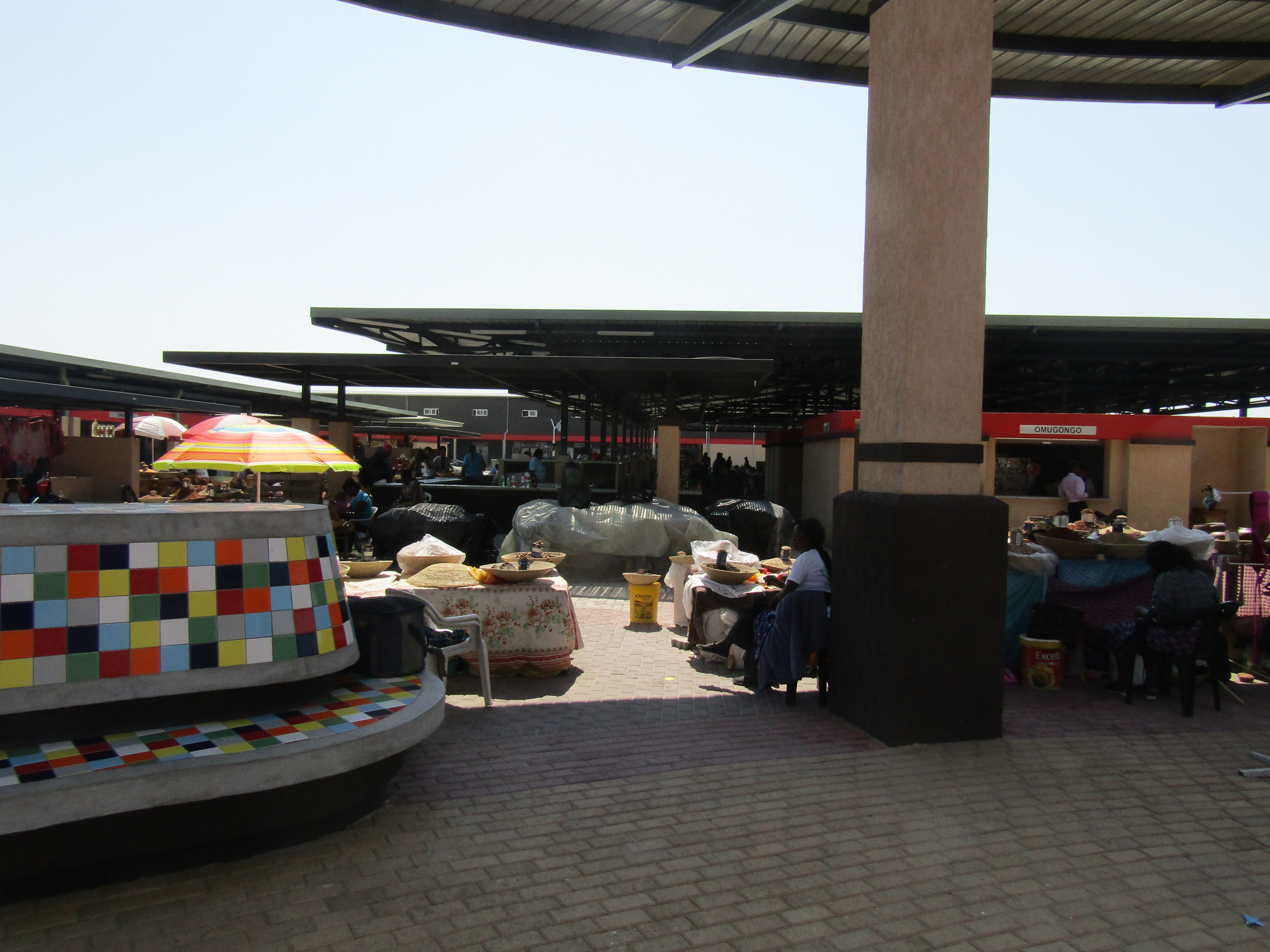
Oshakati New market, 2016

==== South Africa ====
Fresh produce markets have traditionally dominated the South African food chain, handling more than half of all fresh produce. Although large, vertically integrated food retailers, such as supermarkets, are beginning to make inroads into the supply chain, traditional hawkers and produce markets have shown remarkable resilience. The main markets in Johannesburg are: Jozi Real Food Market, Bryanston Organic Market, Pretoria Boeremark specialising in South African delicacies, Hazel Food Market, Panorama Flea Market, Rosebank Sunday Market, Market on Main (a periodic arts market), and neighbourhood markets.

==== The Gambia ====
The "Gambia is Good" initiative was established in 2004 with a view to encouraging a market for locally grown fresh produce rather than imported ones. The plan was designed to "stimulate local livelihoods, inspire entrepreneurship and reduce the environmental and social cost of imported produce".

A great deal of the produce trade is carried out informally on street corners and many shops are little more than market booths. However, dedicated open air and covered markets can be found in the larger towns. Notable markets include: the Serekunda Market in Gambia's largest city, Serekunda, which opens from early morning to late at night 7 days a week and trades in produce, live animals, clothing, accessories, jewellery, crafts, second hand goods and souvenirs; The Albert Market in the capital, Banjul, which sells fresh produce, colourful, locally designed fabrics, musical instruments, carved wooden masks and other local products. Other interesting markets include: Bakau Fish Market in Bakau; Tanji Fish Market, Tanji, where brightly painted fishing boats bring in the fish from where it is immediately preserved using traditional methods and prepared for distribution to other West African countries; The Woodcarvers Market in Brikama which boasts the largest concentration of woodcarvers in the country; the Pottery Market in Basse Santa; the Atlantic Road Craft Market at Bakau and the Senegambia Craft Market at Bakau.

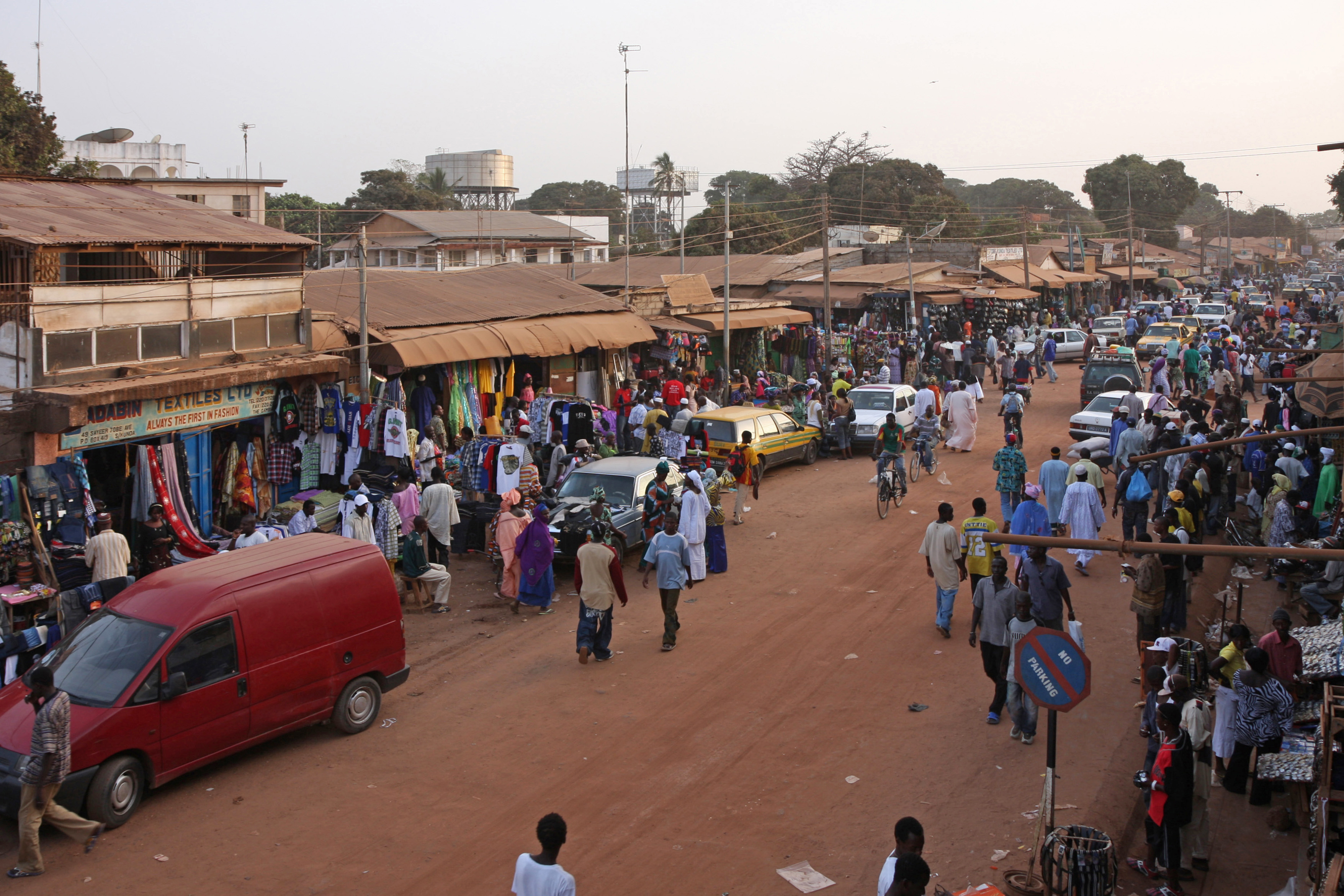
Serekunda Market, Serekunda, The Gambia

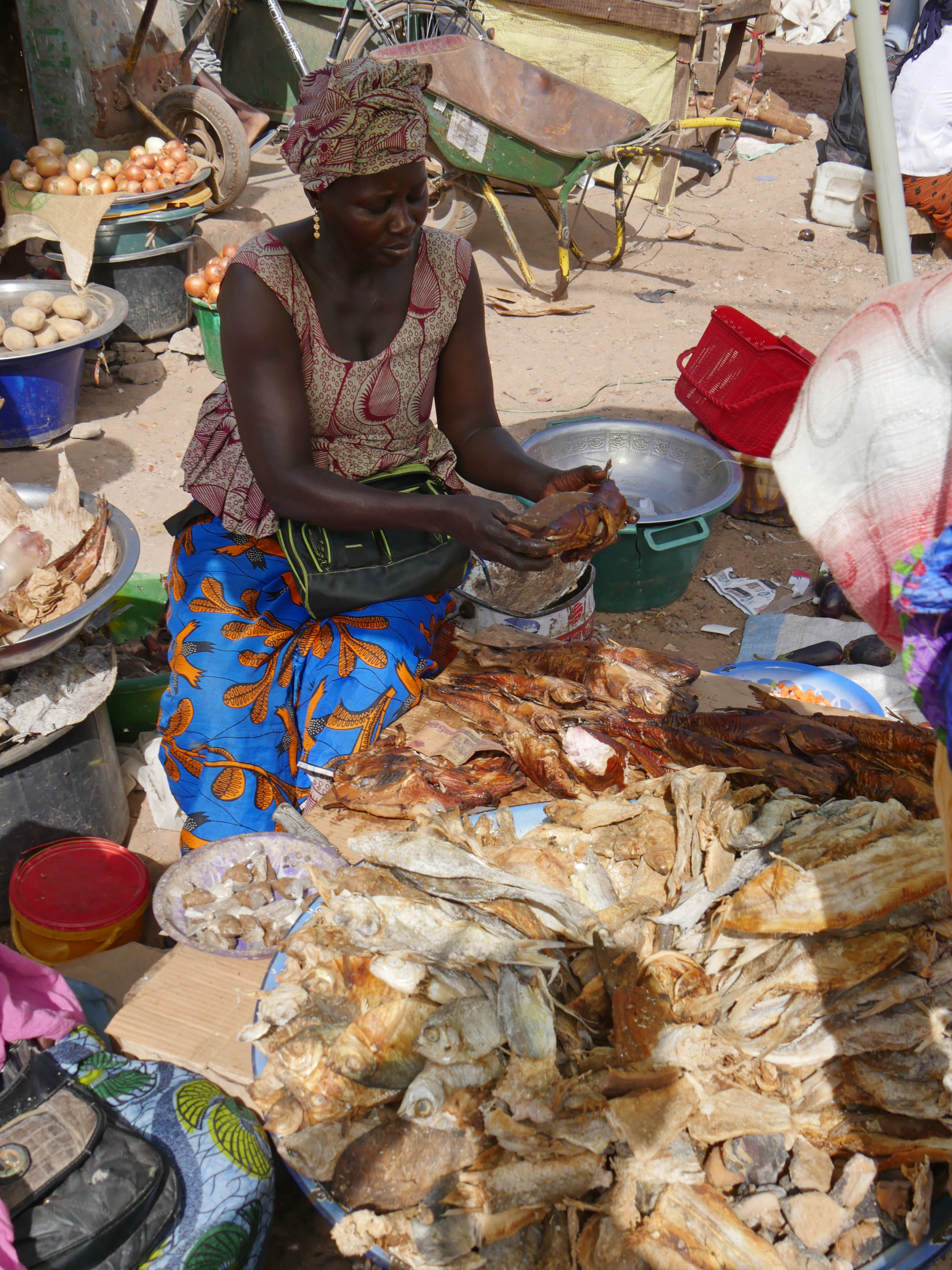
Vendor at Serekunda Market, The Gambia

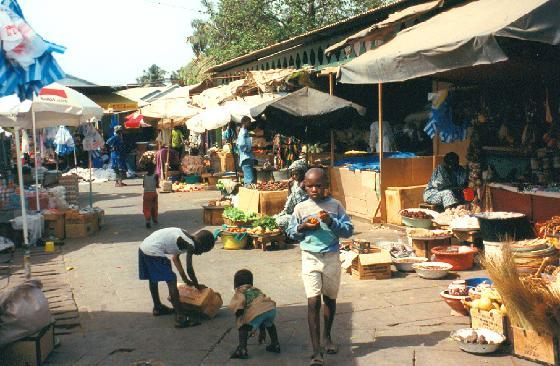
The Albert Market, Banjul, The Gambia

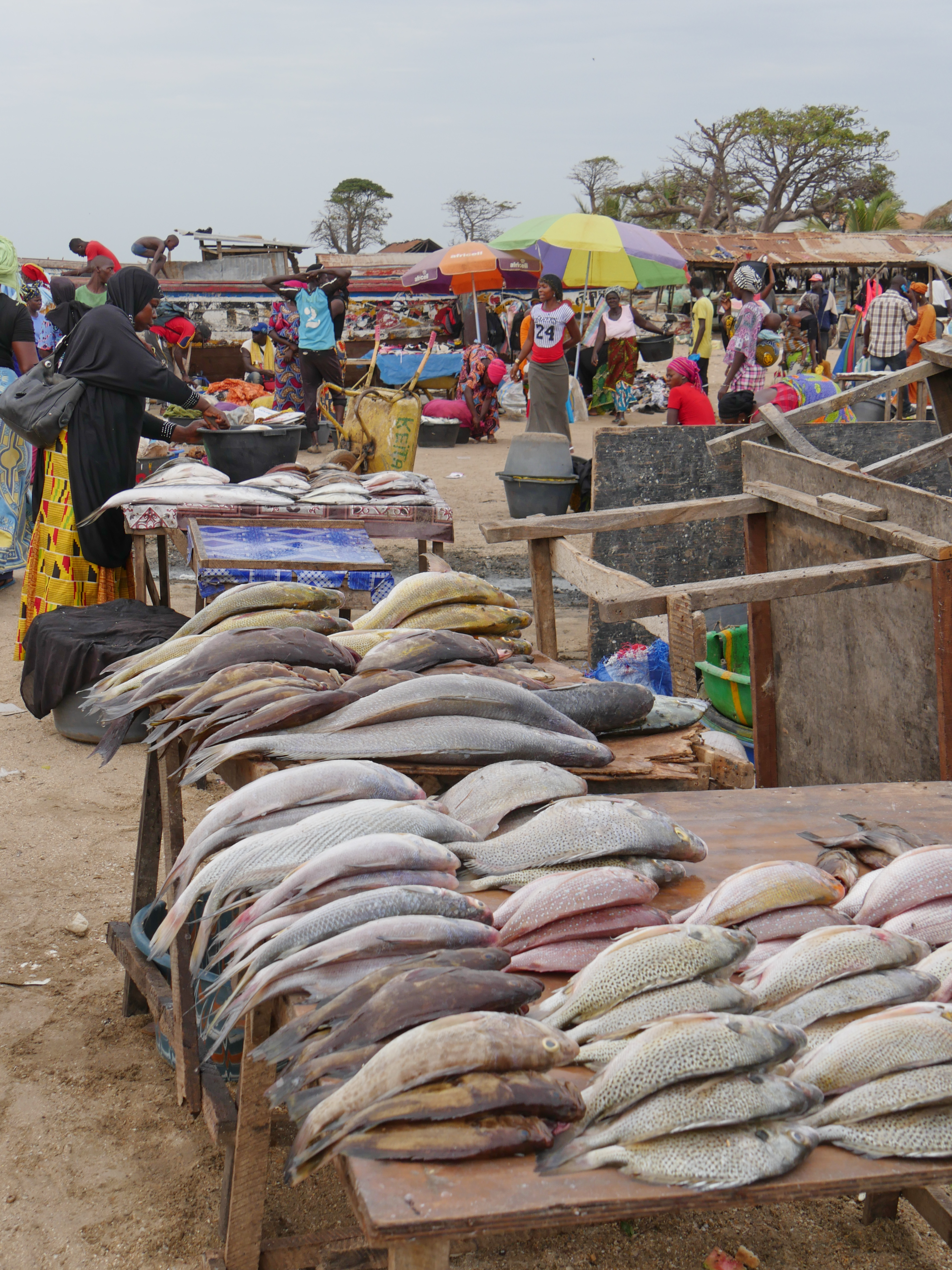
Tanji Fish Market, Tanji, The Gambia

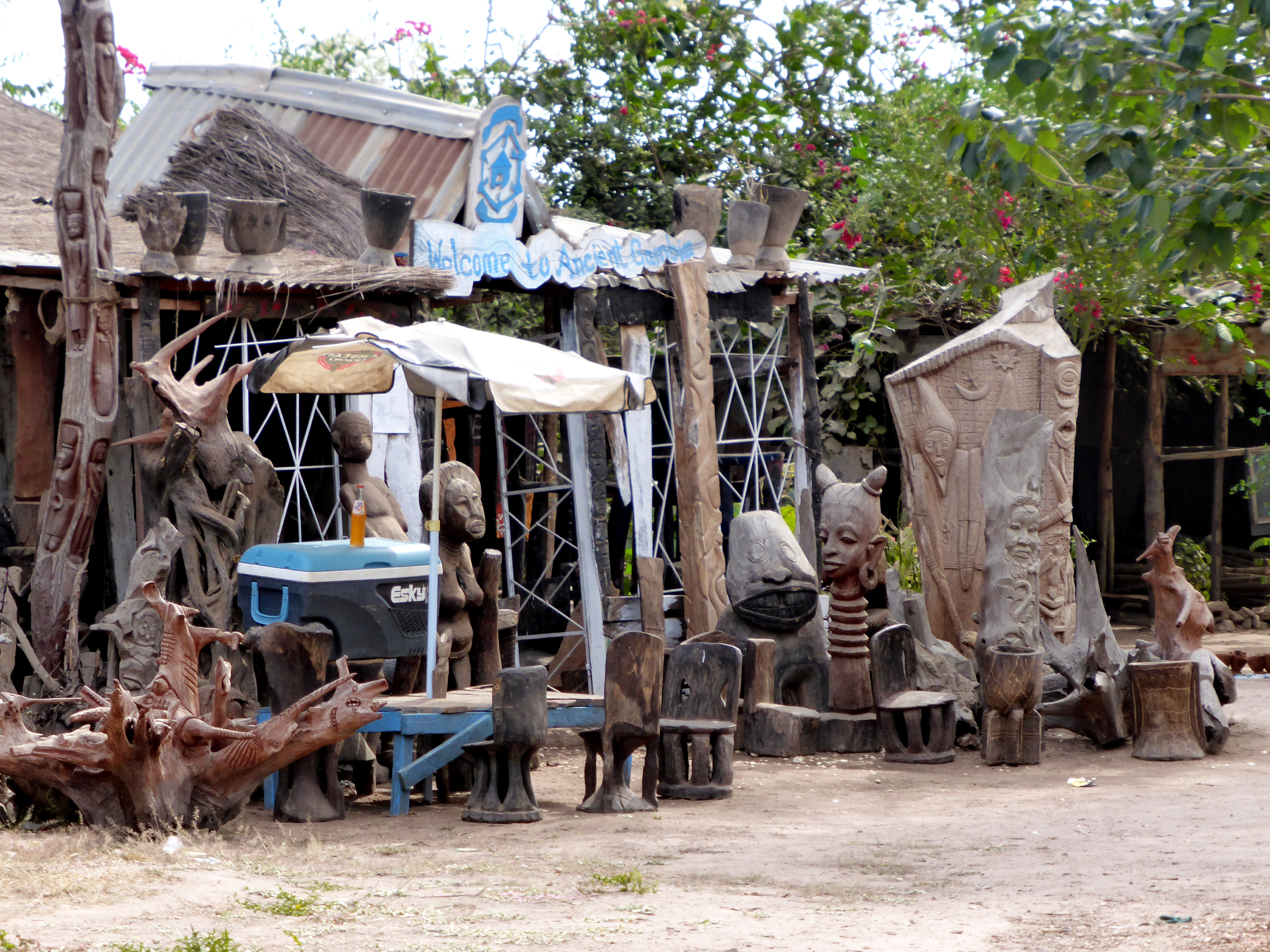
Traditional wood carvings at a market in The Gambia

==== Uganda ====
- Nakawa Market

=== Asia ===
Produce markets in Asia are undergoing major changes as supermarkets enter the retail scene and the growing middle classes acquire preferences for branded goods. Many supermarkets purchase directly from producers, supplanting the traditional role of both wholesale and retail markets. In order to survive, produce markets have been forced to consider value adding opportunities and many retail markets now focus on ready-to-eat food and take-away food.

==== East Asia ====
===== China =====
In China, the existence of street and wet markets has been known for centuries; however, many of these were restricted in the 1950s and 1960s and only permitted to re-open in 1978. The distinction between wholesale and retail markets is somewhat ambiguous in China, since many markets serve both as distribution centres and retail shopping venues. To assist in the distribution of food, more than 9,000 wholesale produce markets operate in China. Some of these markets operate on a very large scale. For example, Beijing's Xinfadi Wholesale market, currently under renovation, is expected to have a footprint of 112 hectares when complete. The Beijing Zoo Market (retail market) is a collection of 12 different markets, comprising some 20,000 tenant stall-holders, 30,000 employees and more than 100,000 customers daily.

China is both a major importer and exporter of fruit and vegetables and is now the world's largest exporter of apples. In addition to produce markets, China has many specialised markets such as a silk market, clothing markets and an antiques market. China's fresh produce market is undergoing major change. In the larger cities, purchasing is gradually moving to online with door-to-door deliveries.

Some of the more important markets in China include:

- Wholesale produce market: Xinfadi (wholesale produce market, Beijing) - with an annual turnover volume of 14 million tonnes of meat, fruit and vegetables, it supplies 70 percent of Beijing's vegetables and Nanzhan (Shenyang, Liaoning) which supplies the northern provinces.
- Retail produce markets: The fresh produce market at Hutong market (Beijing); Xiabu Xiabu market (Beijing), Panjiayuan market (Beijing); Dazhongsi market (Beijing), Tianyi market (Beijing), Beijing Zoo market, Dahongmen market (Fengtai District, Beijing), Sanyuanli market (Beijing), Shengfu Xiaoguan morning market (Beijing), Lishuiqiao seafood farmers' market (Beijing), Wangjing Zonghe market (Beijing), Chaowai market (Beijing), Zhenbai market (Shanghai's largest produce market)
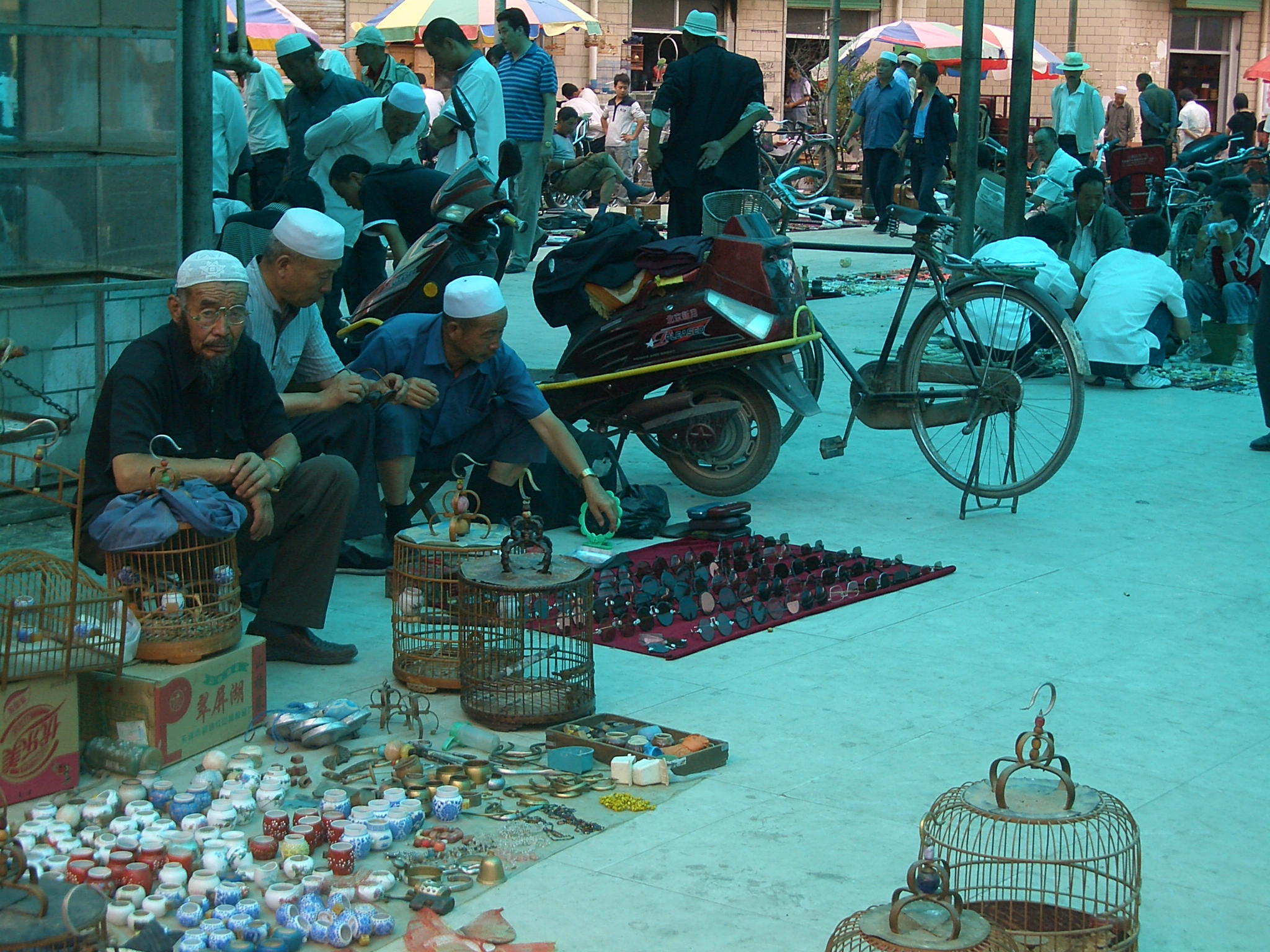
Hui vendors at Linxia City Market

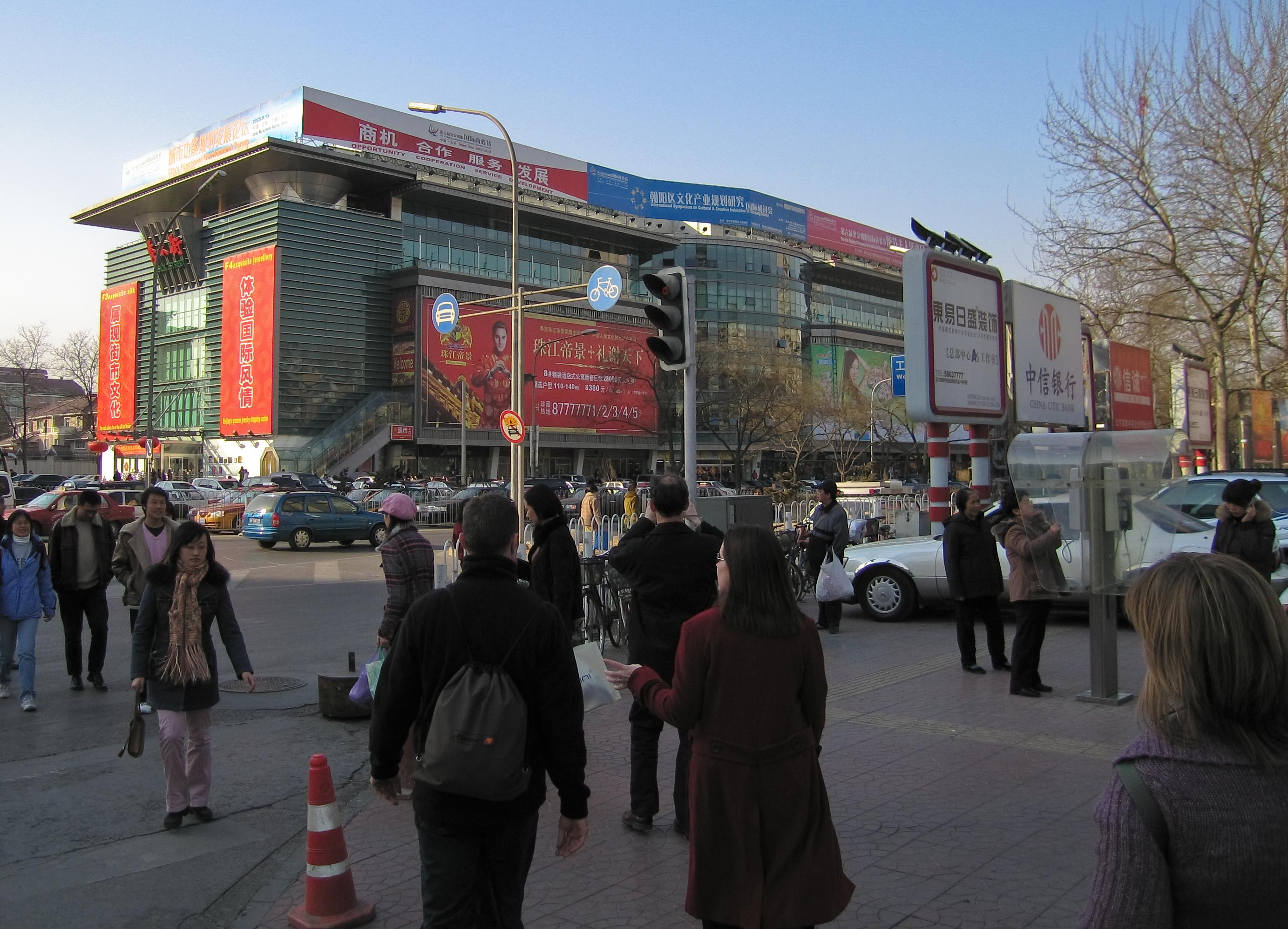
Beijing silk market

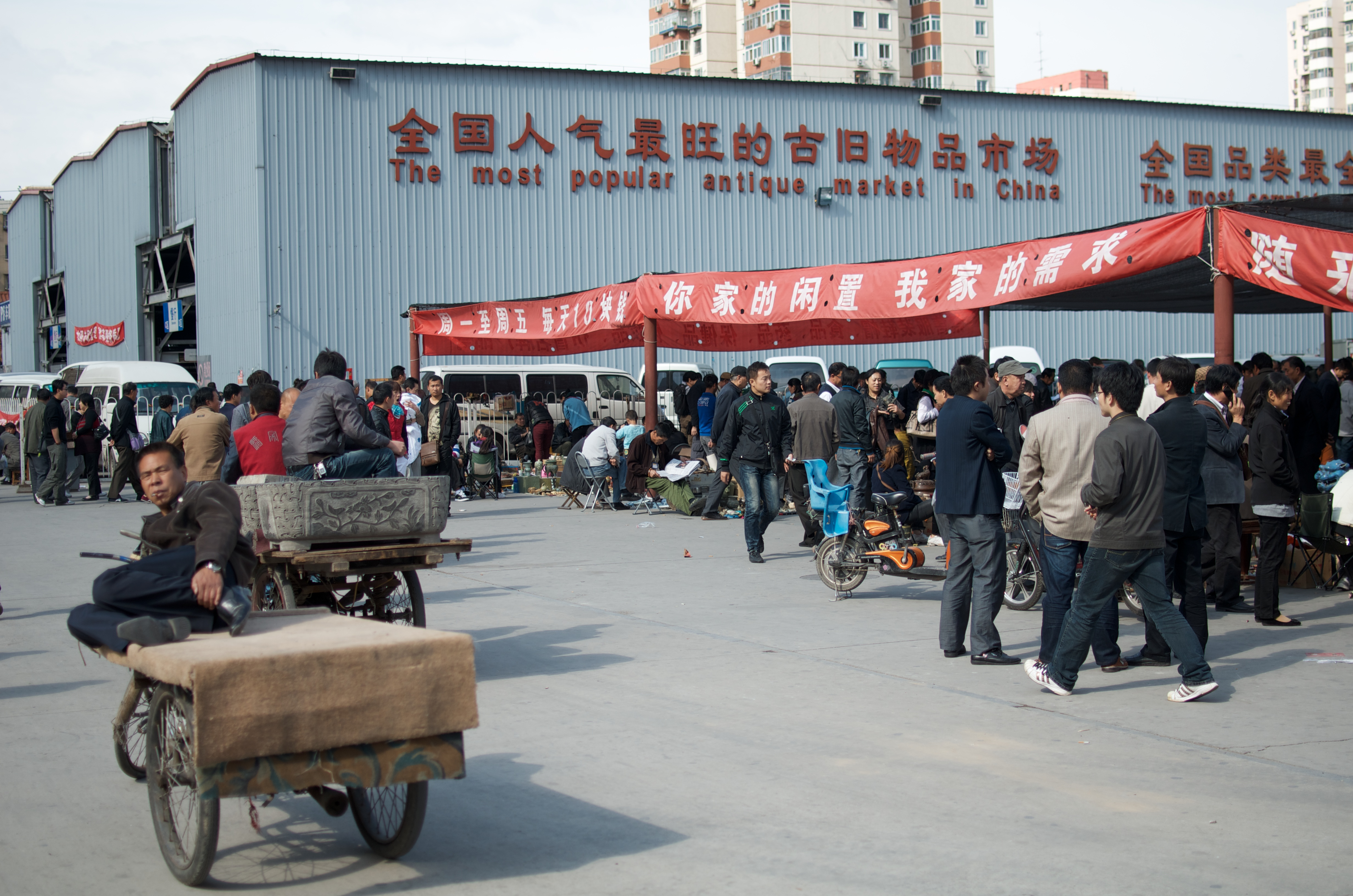
Panjiayuan Market, Beijing (exterior)

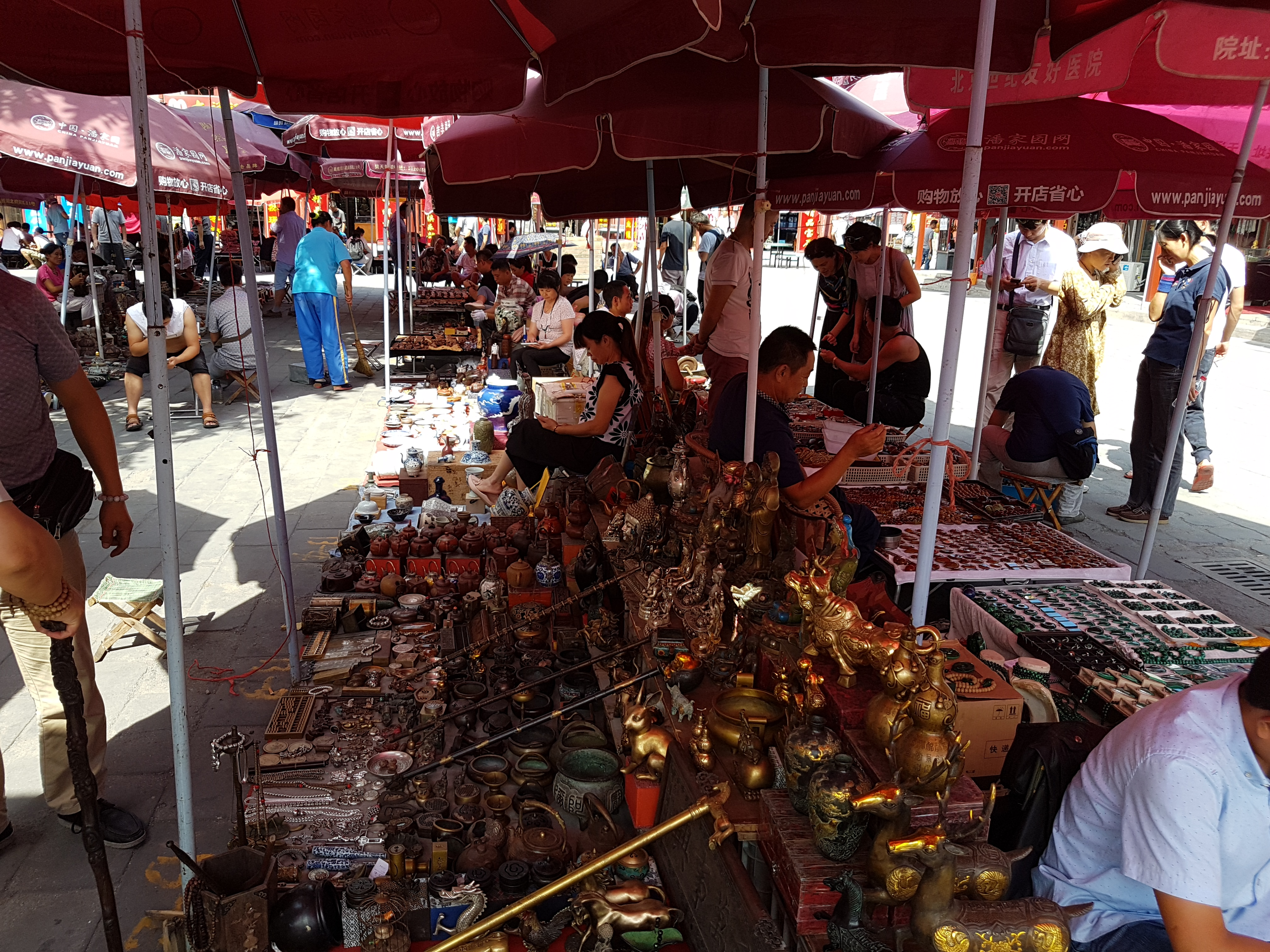
Panjiayuan Market, Beijing (external stallholder)

Panjiayuan Market, Beijing (interior)

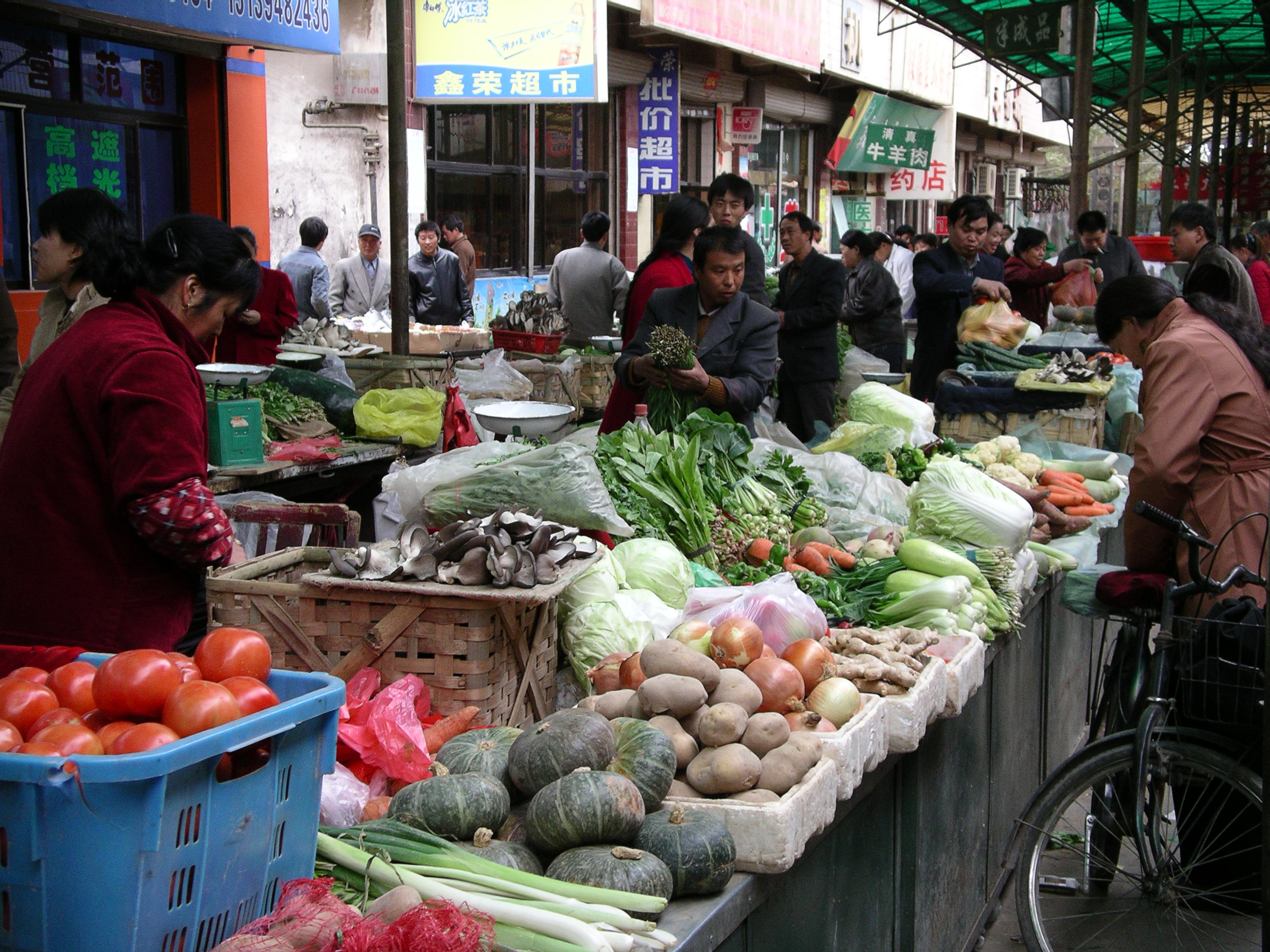
Dunhuang market

====== Hong Kong ======
Hong Kong relies heavily imports to meet its fresh produce needs. Importers are consequently an important part of the distribution network, and some importers supply directly to retail consumers. Street markets in Hong Kong are held every day except on a few traditional Chinese holidays like Chinese New Year. Stalls opened at two sides of a street are required to have licenses issued by the Hong Kong Government. The various types of street markets include fresh foods, clothing, cooked foods, flowers and electronics. The earliest form of market was a gaa si (wet market). Some traditional markets have been replaced by shopping centres, markets in municipal service buildings and supermarkets, while others have become tourist attractions such as Tung Choi Street and Apliu Street. The Central Market, Hong Kong is a grade II listed building.

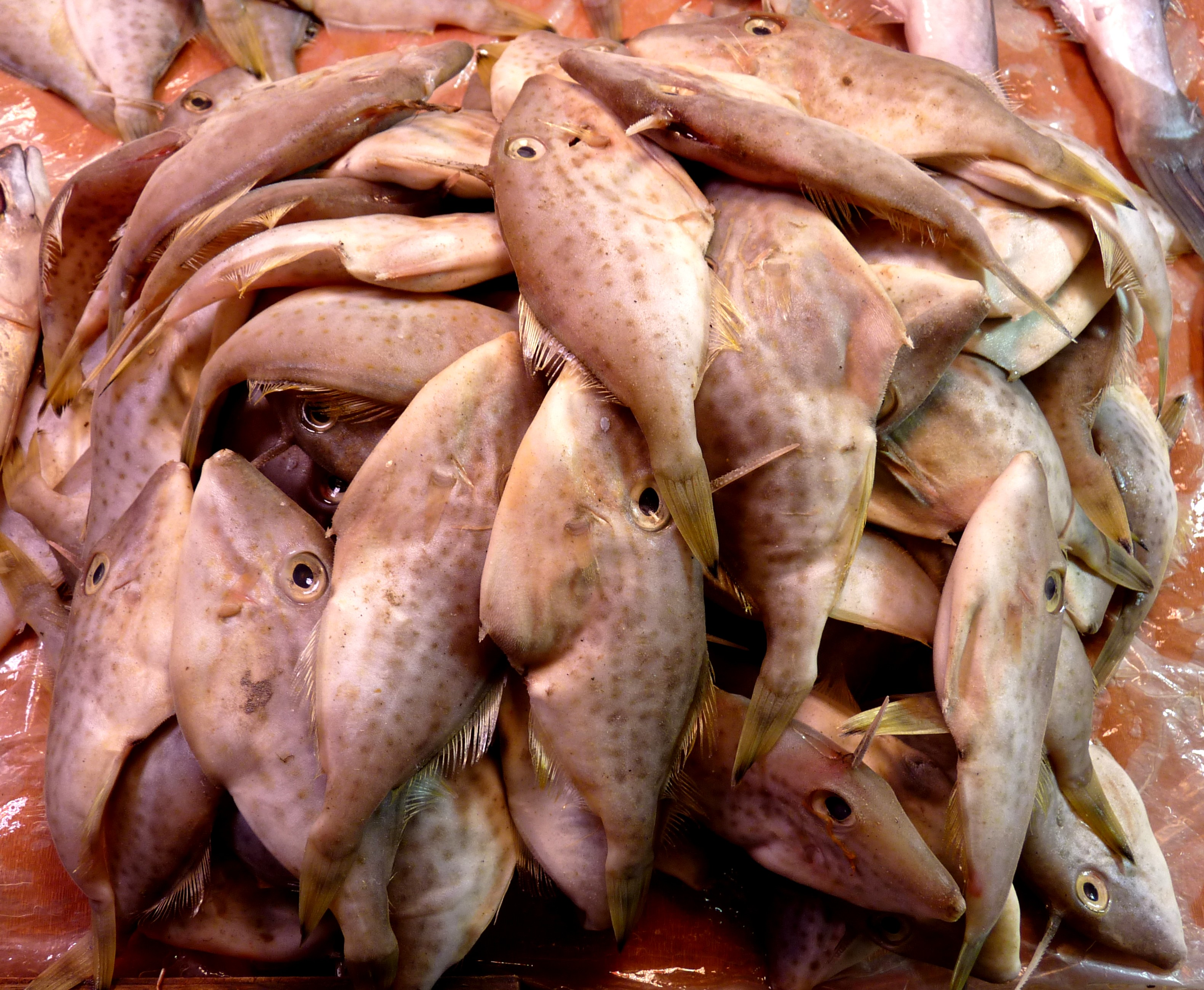
Fish Market in Hong Kong

===== Japan =====
- Tsukiji fish market
- Kochi Sunday Market
- Hirome Ichiba

===== South Korea =====
Although the majority of markets in South Korea are wholesale markets, retail customers are permitted to make purchases in all of them. The Gwangjang Market is the nation's top market and is a popular tourist destination.

===== Taiwan =====
Taiwan meets most of its produce needs through local production. The country has an active network of wholesale and retail markets. According to The Guardian newspaper, Taiwan has "the best night market scene in the world and some of the most exciting street food in Asia".

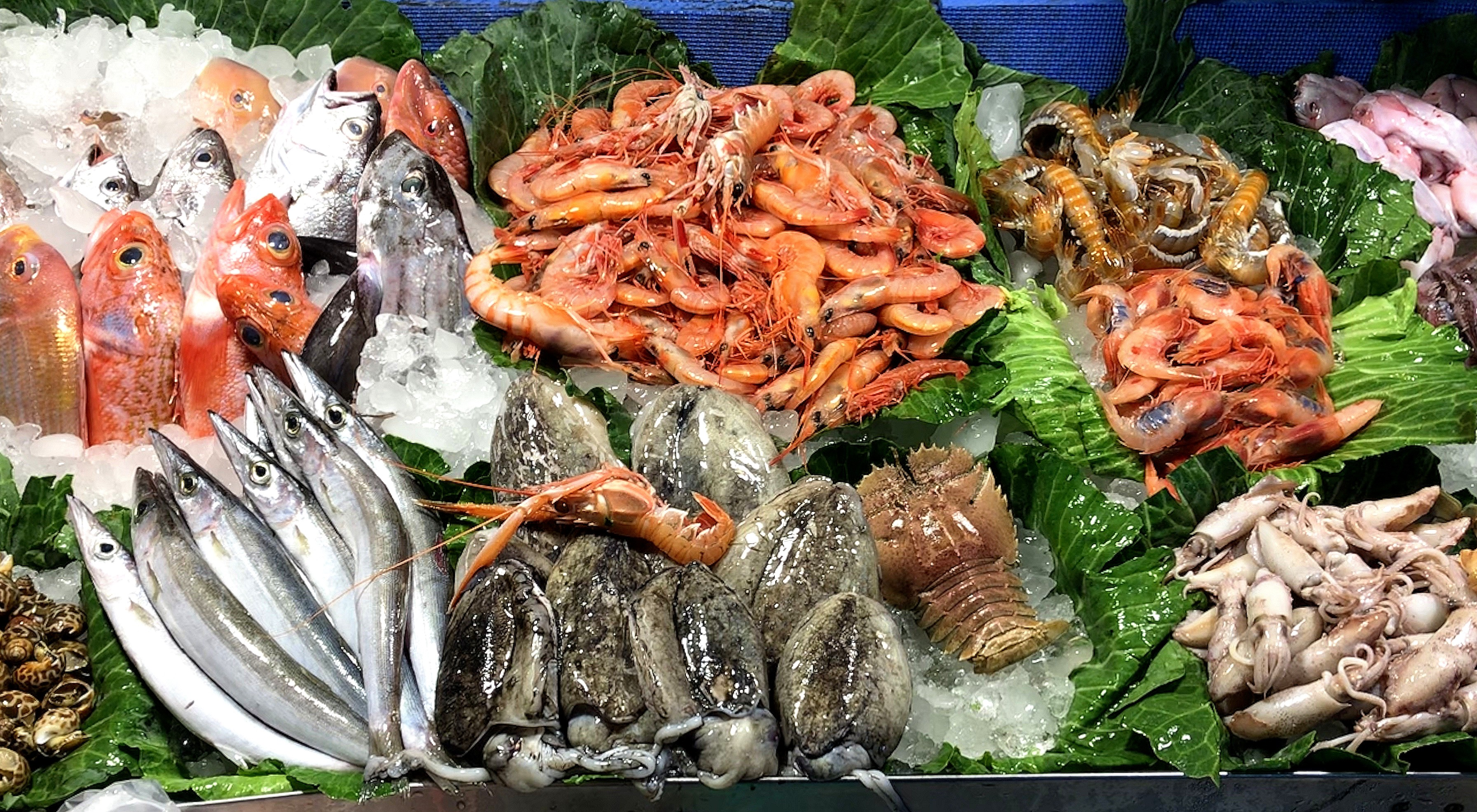
Fish market in Taipei

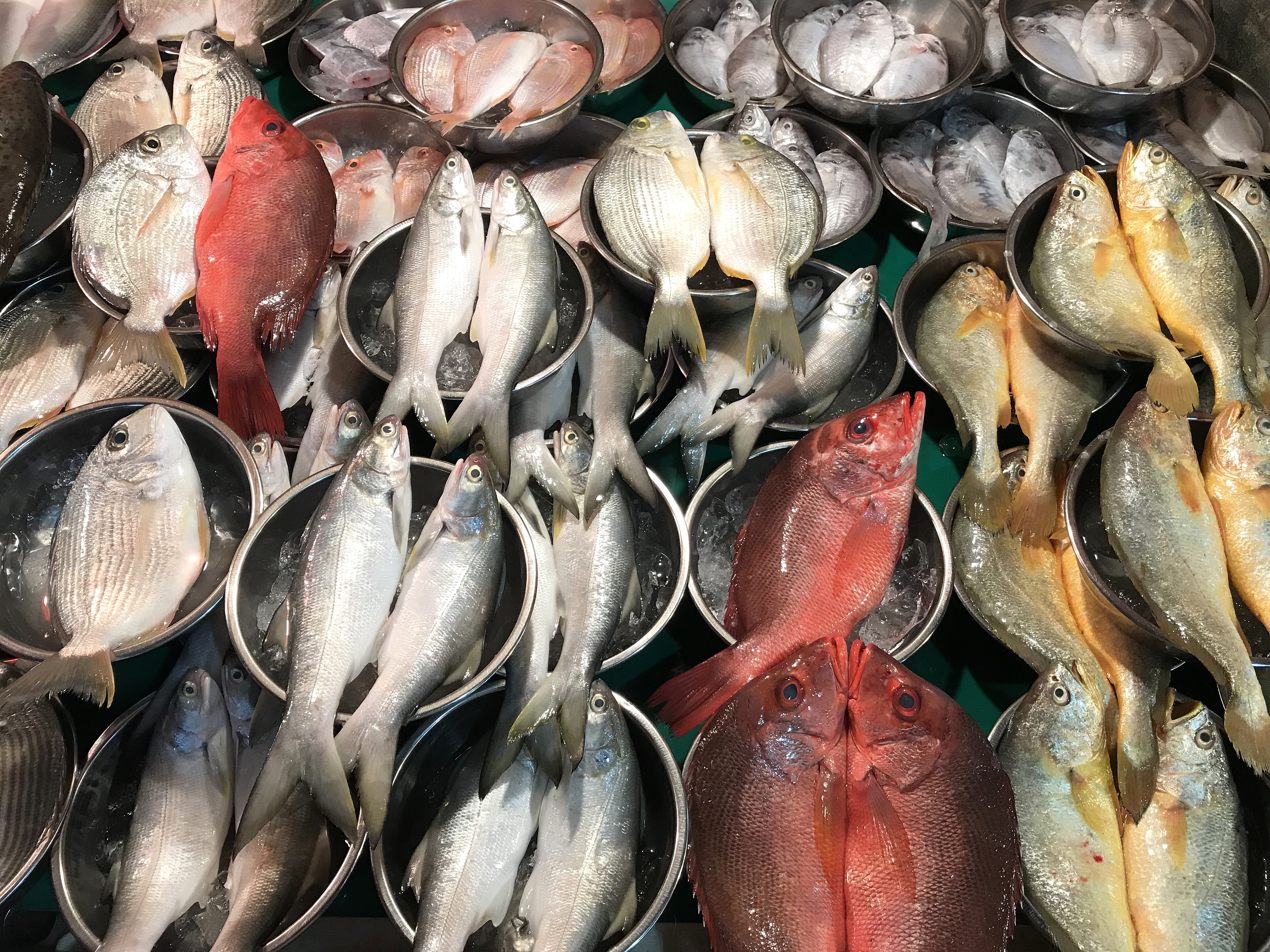
Fish market in Tamsui

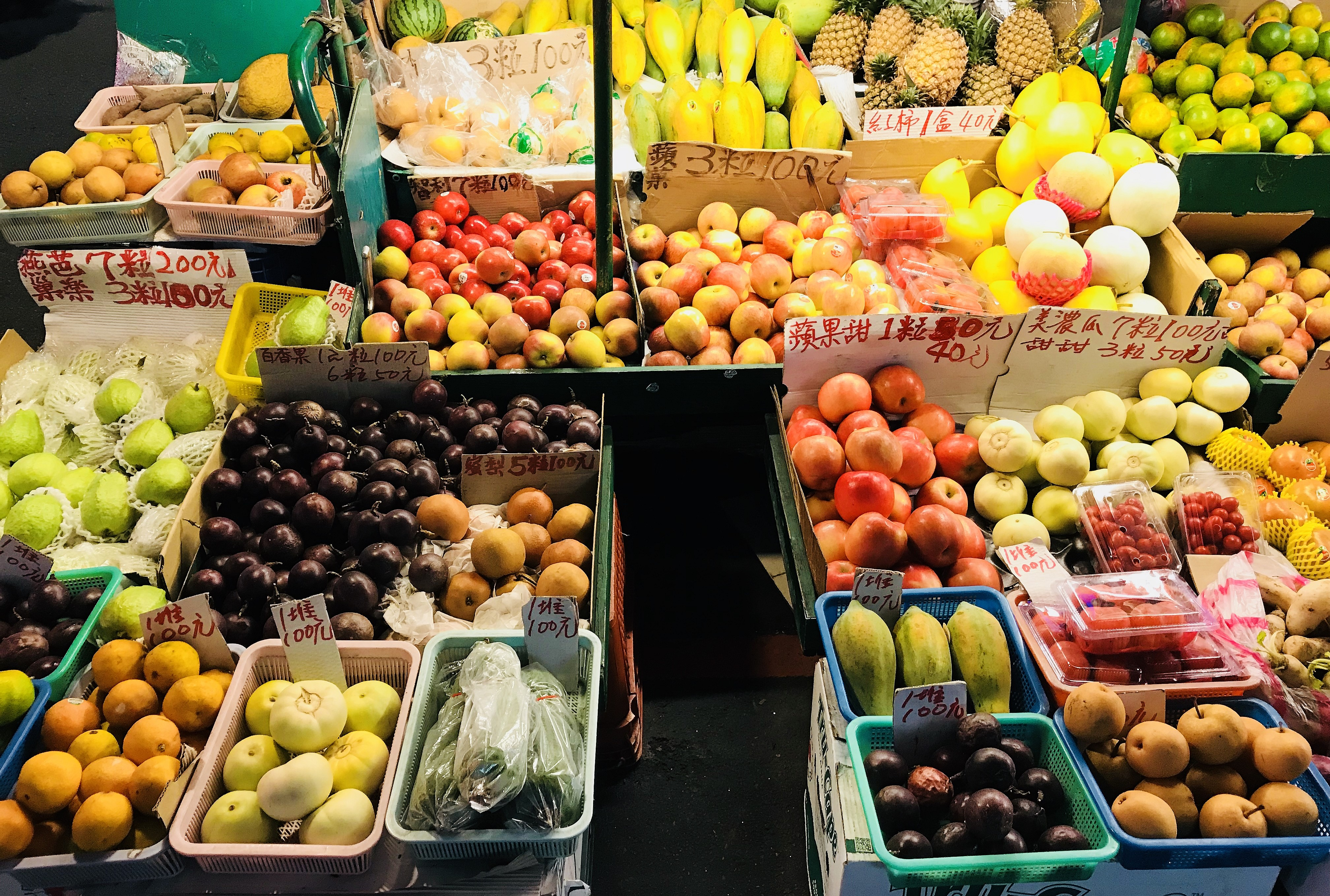
Fruit market in Taipei

==== South Asia ====
In South Asia, especially Nepal, India, and Bangladesh, a haat (also known as hat), refers to a regular rural produce market, typically held once or twice per week.

===== India =====
The marketing historian, Petty, has suggested that Indian marketplaces first arose during the Chola Dynasty (approx. 850–1279 CE) during a period of favourable economic conditions. Distinct types of markets were evident: nagaaram (streets of shops, often devoted to specific types of goods; angadi (markets) and perangadi (large markets in the inner city districts)).

The sub-continent may have borrowed the concept of covered marketplaces from the Middle East around the tenth century with the arrival of Islam. The caravanserai and covered market structures, known as suqs, first began to appear along the silk routes and were located in the area just outside the city perimeter. Following the tradition established on the Arabian peninsula, India also established temporary-seasonal markets in regional districts. In Rajasthan's Pushkar, an annual camel market was first recorded in the 15th century. However, following the foundation of the Mughal Empire in northern India during the 16th century, this arrangement changed. A covered bazaar or market place became integrated into city structures and was to be found in the city centre. Markets and bazaars were well known in the colonial era. Some of these bazaars appear to have specialised in particular types of produce. The Patna district, in the 17th century, was home to 175 weaver villages and the Patna Bazaar enjoyed a reputation as a centre of trade in fine cloth. When the Italian writer and traveller, Niccolao Manucci, visited there in 1863, he found many merchants trading in cotton and silk in Patna's bazaars.

In India today, many different types of market serve retail and commercial clients:

1. Wholesale markets
  - Primary wholesale markets: Held once or twice per week, these sell produce from local villages e.g. Rice Bazaar at Thissur in Kerala.
  - Secondary wholesale markets (also known as mandis): Smaller merchants purchase from primary markets and sell at secondary markets. A small number of primary producers may sell direct to mandis.
  - Terminal markets: Markets that sell directly to the end-user, whether it be the consumer, food processor, or shipping agent for export to foreign countries e.g. Bombay Terminal Market.
2. Retail markets
  - Retail markets: Spread across villages, towns and cities.
  - Fairs: Held on religious days and deal in livestock and agricultural produce.

In India (and also Bangladesh and Pakistan), a landa bazaar is a type of a bazaar or a marketplace with lowest prices where only secondhand general goods are exchanged or sold. A haat also refers to a bazaar or market in Bangladesh and Pakistan and the term may also be used in India. A saddar refers to the main, central market in a town while a mandi refers to a large marketplace. A Meena Bazaar is a marketplace where goods are sold in an effort to raise money for charity.

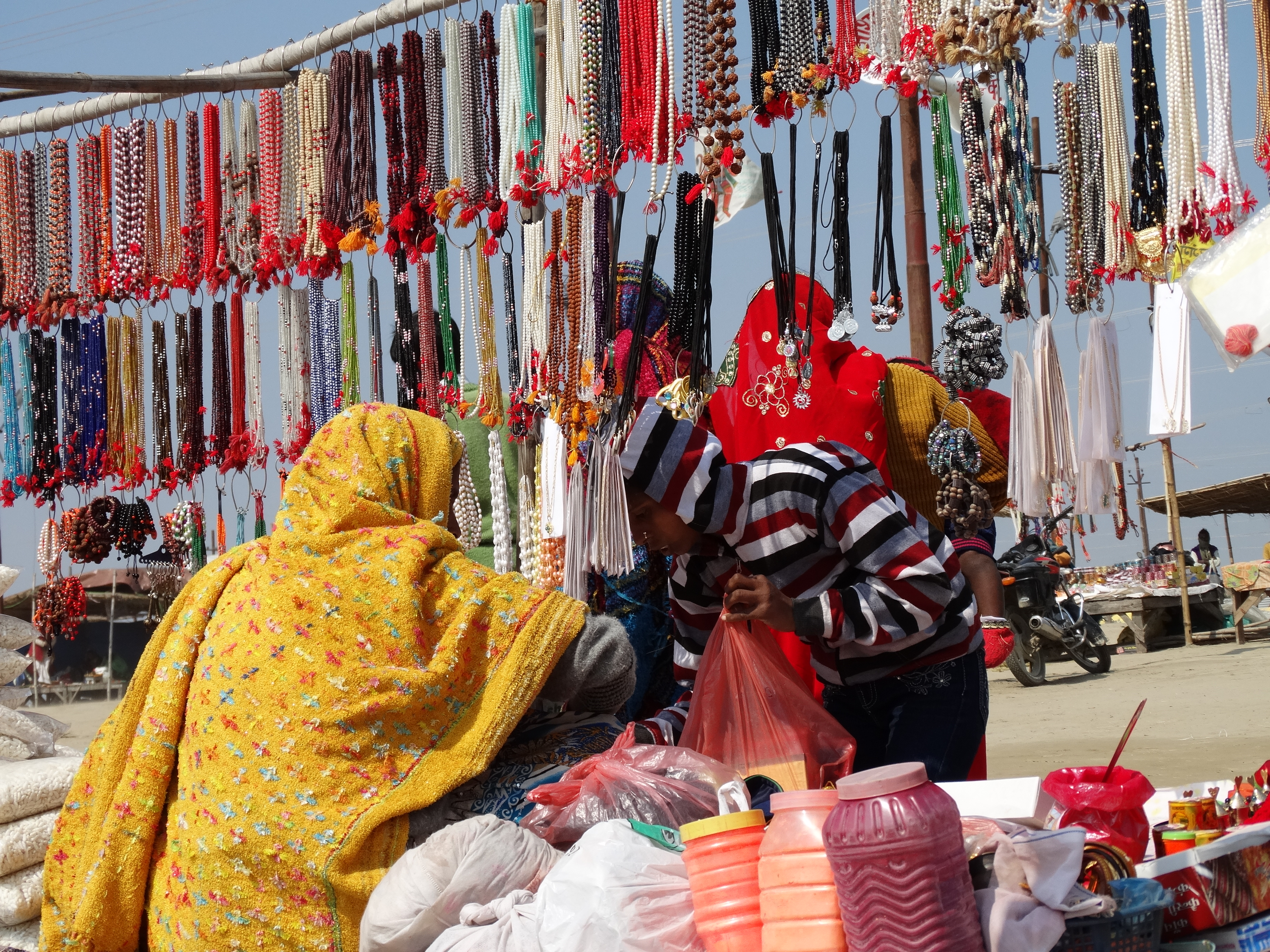
Magh Mela at Prayaga Sangam Uttar Pradesh India is a fair associated with the Sankranti Hindu festival

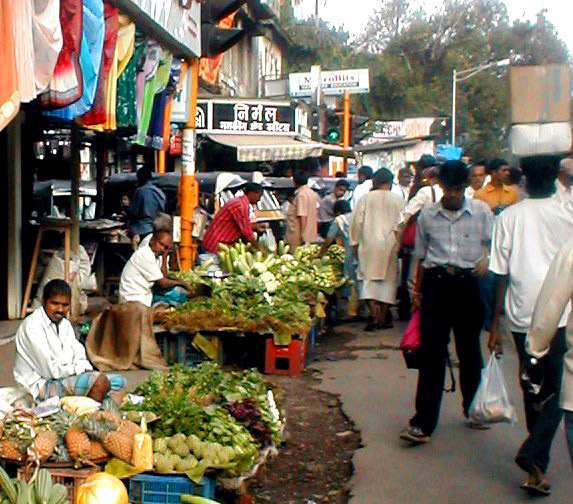
The Bombay Street Market is a terminal market

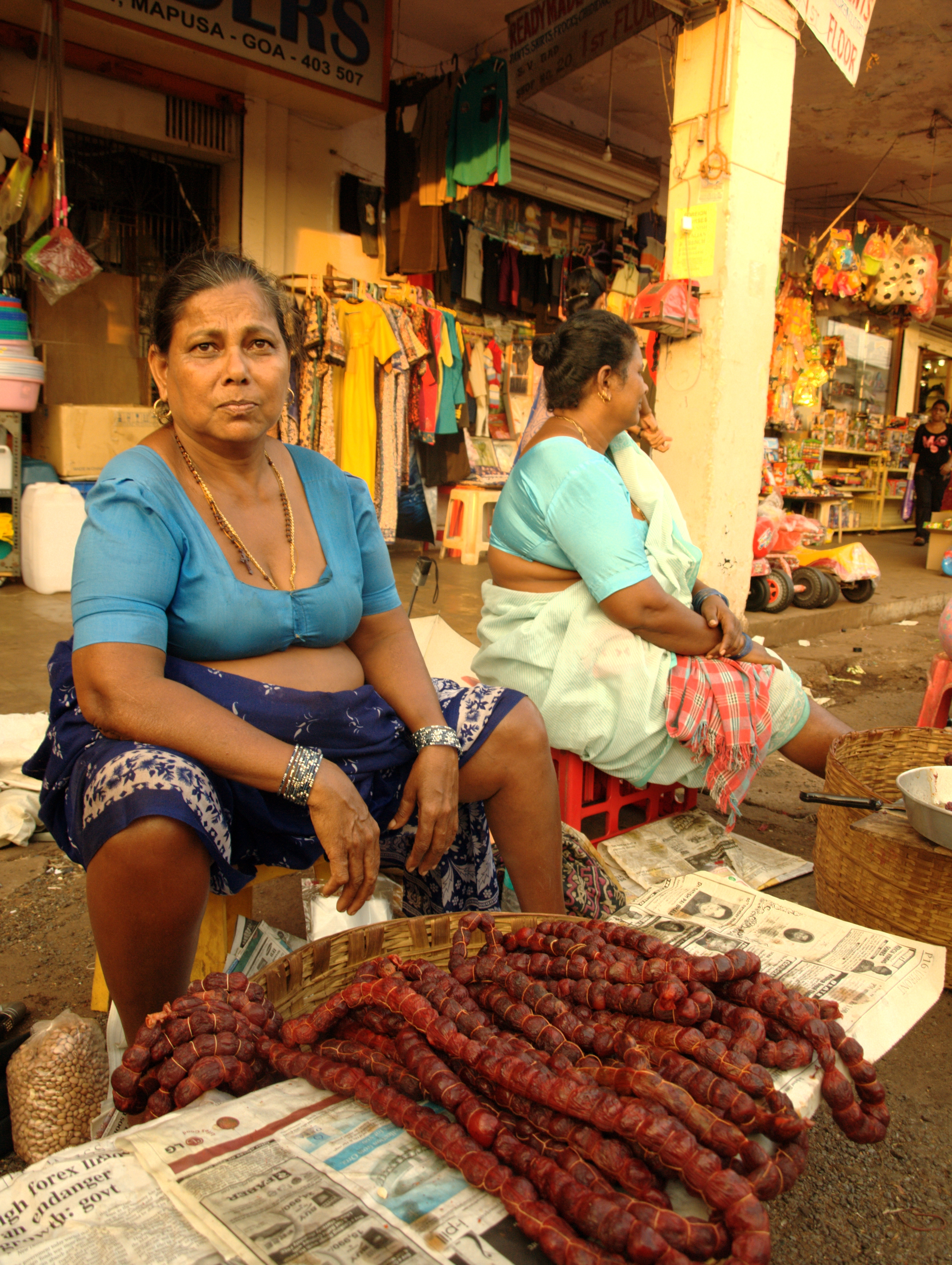
Goan sausages being sold at the Mapusa market, Goa, India

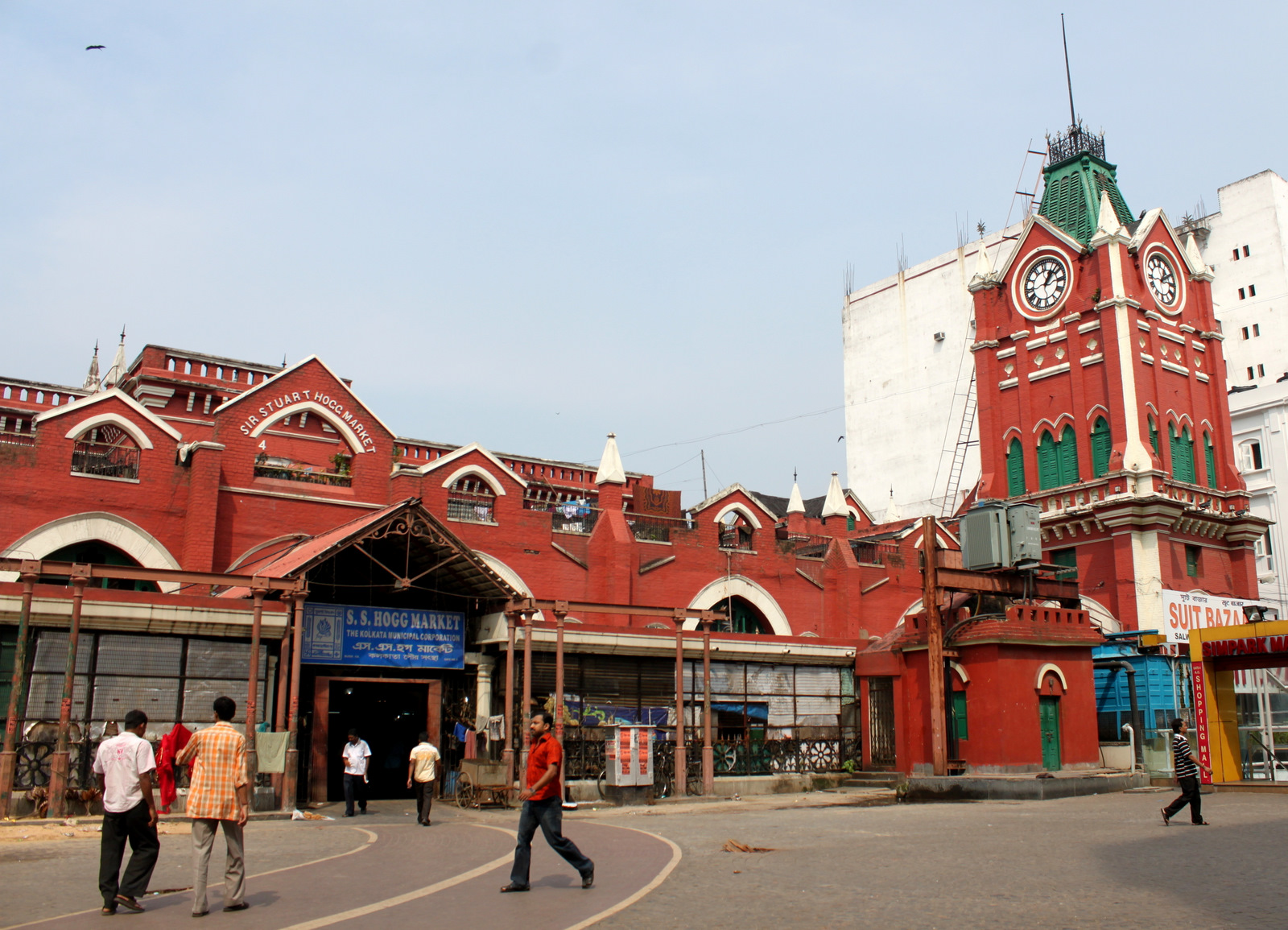
New Market, Kolkata, India

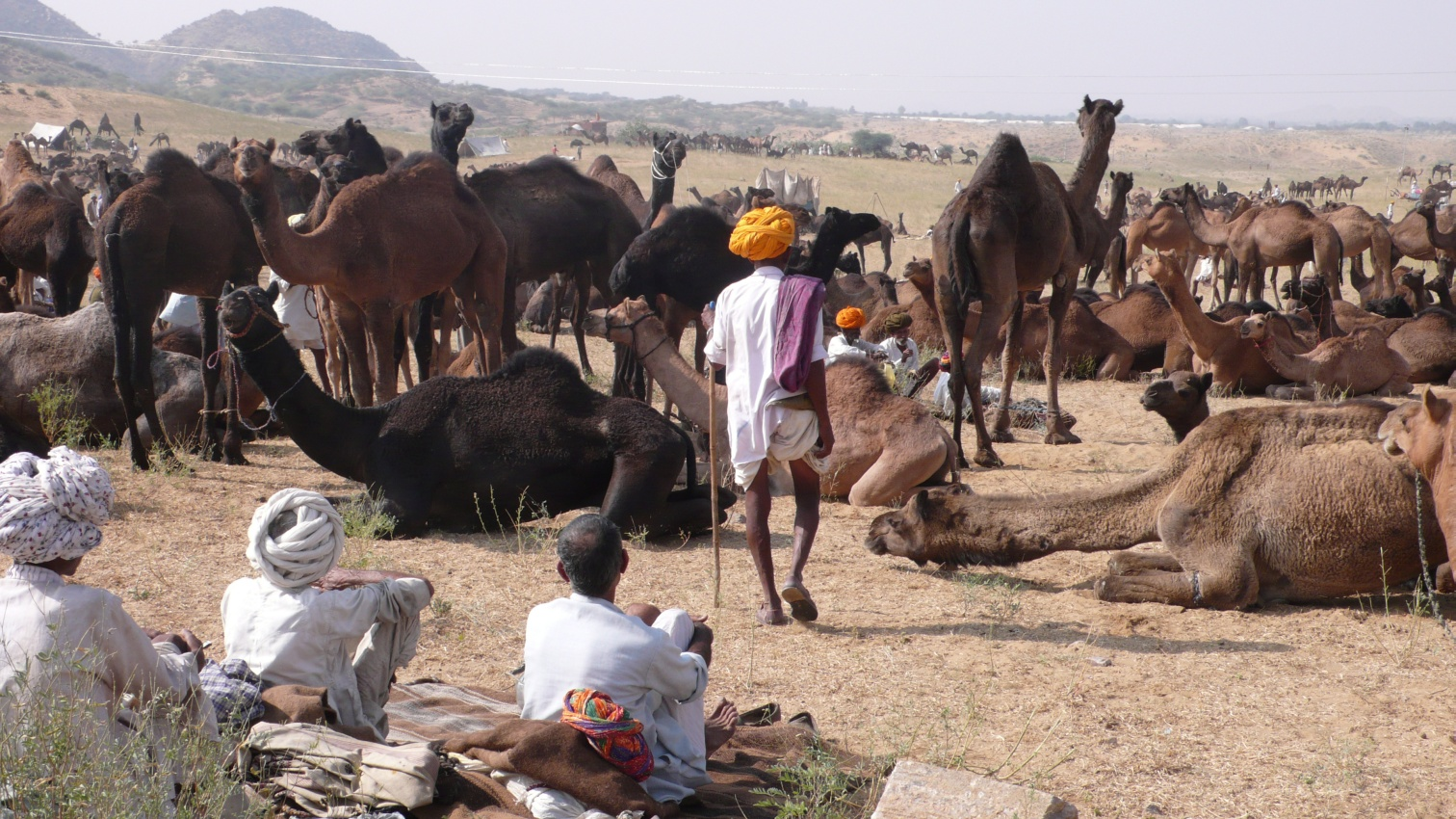
Annual camel market at Pushkar in Rajasthan, India

====== Agra ======
- Sadar Bazaar, Agra

====== Bangalore ======
- Gandhi Bazaar

====== Chennai ======
- Pondy Bazaar (officially named Soundarapandian Angadi), T. Nagar, Chennai

====== Delhi ======
- Lajpat Nagar market, Delhi
- Dilli Haat
- Sadar Bazaar, Delhi
- Palika Bazaar – an underground market in Delhi

====== Goa ======
- Mapusa Friday Market Mapusa, North Goa

====== Himachal Pradesh ======
- Lakkar Bazaar Shimla, Himachal Pradesh

====== Manipur ======
- Khwairamband Bazar Imphal, Manipur, India – a market operated entirely by women

====== Mumbai ======
- Bhendi Bazaar
- Chira Bazaar, Mumbai – known for its jewellery
- Dava Bazaar also known as Dawa Bazaar
- Zaveri Bazaar – jewellery market

====== Punjab ======
- Chaura Bazaar, Ludhiana, Punjab

====== Uttar Pradesh ======
- Ajhuwa Bazaar, Ajhuwa, Kaushambi district, Uttar Pradesh, India

==== Southeast Asia ====
Southeast Asia is noted for its night markets, floating markets and pirate markets (markets that specialise in selling "knock off" copies of designer brands). Some Asian countries have developed unique distribution systems and highly specialised types of market place. Throughout Asia, a wet market refers to a place where fruit, vegetables, fish, seafood, and meat products are sold. Throughout much of Asia, produce markets are known as morning markets due to their hours of operation, while night markets specialise in selling non-perishables including clothing, accessories, local artefacts, souvenirs, and a wide assortment of personal goods.

===== Cambodia =====
====== Phnom Penh ======
- Central Market, Phnom Penh

===== Indonesia =====
In Indonesia, a pasar pagi is a particular type of wet market, also known as a "morning market" which typically operates from early morning to the afternoon. Pasar malam refers to a night market operated in later hours from late afternoon to night, approximately from 17:00 to 22:00, and only on selected days of a week.

The types of goods being sold is also quite different. Pasar pagi is where many housewives, domestic help, and local folks appear to shop their daily needs, mostly fresh produce. The products which are on sale are usually fresh produce, including fruits, vegetables, spices, fish, meat, eggs, and a variety of perishable products.

Major textile, fashion, and clothing markets in Indonesia are Tanah Abang market in central Jakarta and Pasar Baru in Bandung. Notable markets specializing in traditional batik clothing include Pasar Klewer in Solo and Pasar Beringharjo in Yogyakarta.

The major pasar pagi in Jakarta are Pasar Pagi Mangga Dua, Pasar Induk Kramat Jati, Pasar Minggu and Pasar Senen. Pasar Minggu specialized on fruits and vegetables, while Pasar Kue Subuh in Senen specialized on selling kue, as they offer a rich variety of traditional Indonesian snack, open every subuh (dawn).

Notable markets in Yogyakarta, include: Pasar Beringharjo, a traditional market; Kranggan Market, a flea market; Pasar Organik Milas, organic and flea market; Malioboro Road, a street market and Yogyakarta Bird Market.

Notable markets in Bali include Pasar Badung central market of Denpasar city, Pasar Seni Sukowati art market specializing in artworks and handicrafts, and Pasar Ubud.

In several cities and towns in Kalimantan and Sumatra, there are floating markets, which is a collection of vendors selling various produce and product on boats. For example, the Siring floating market in Banjarmasin and Lok Baintan floating market in Martapura, both in South Kalimantan.

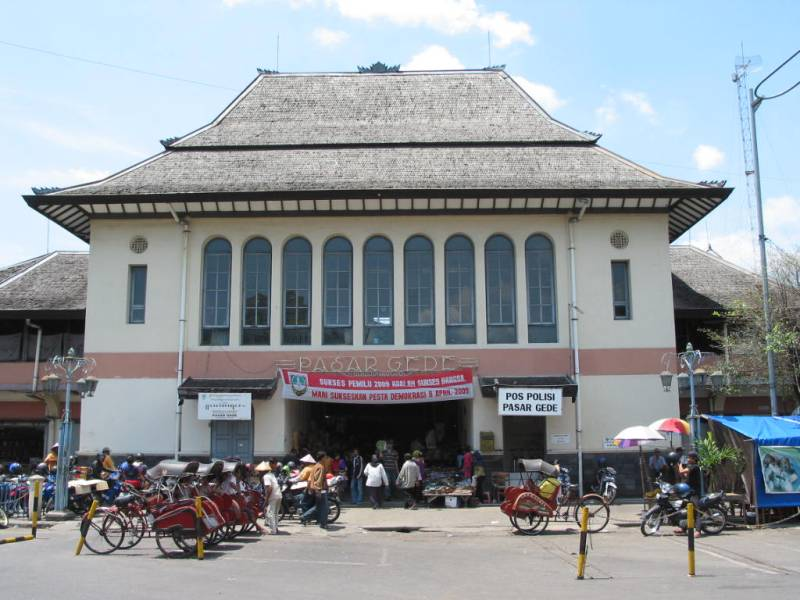
Pasar Gede central market, Solo

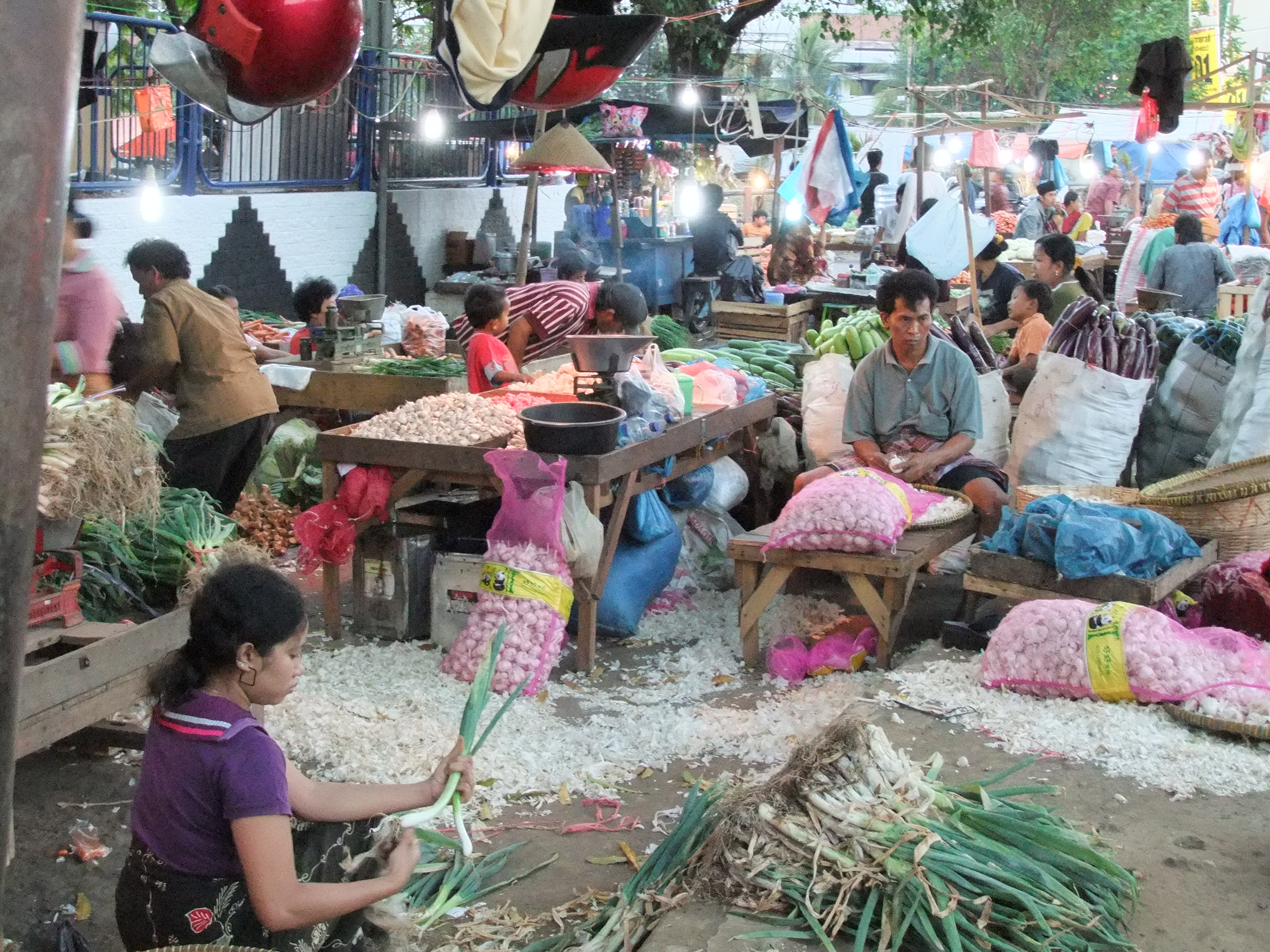
Pasar Keputran, a pasar pagi or morning wet market, Surabaya

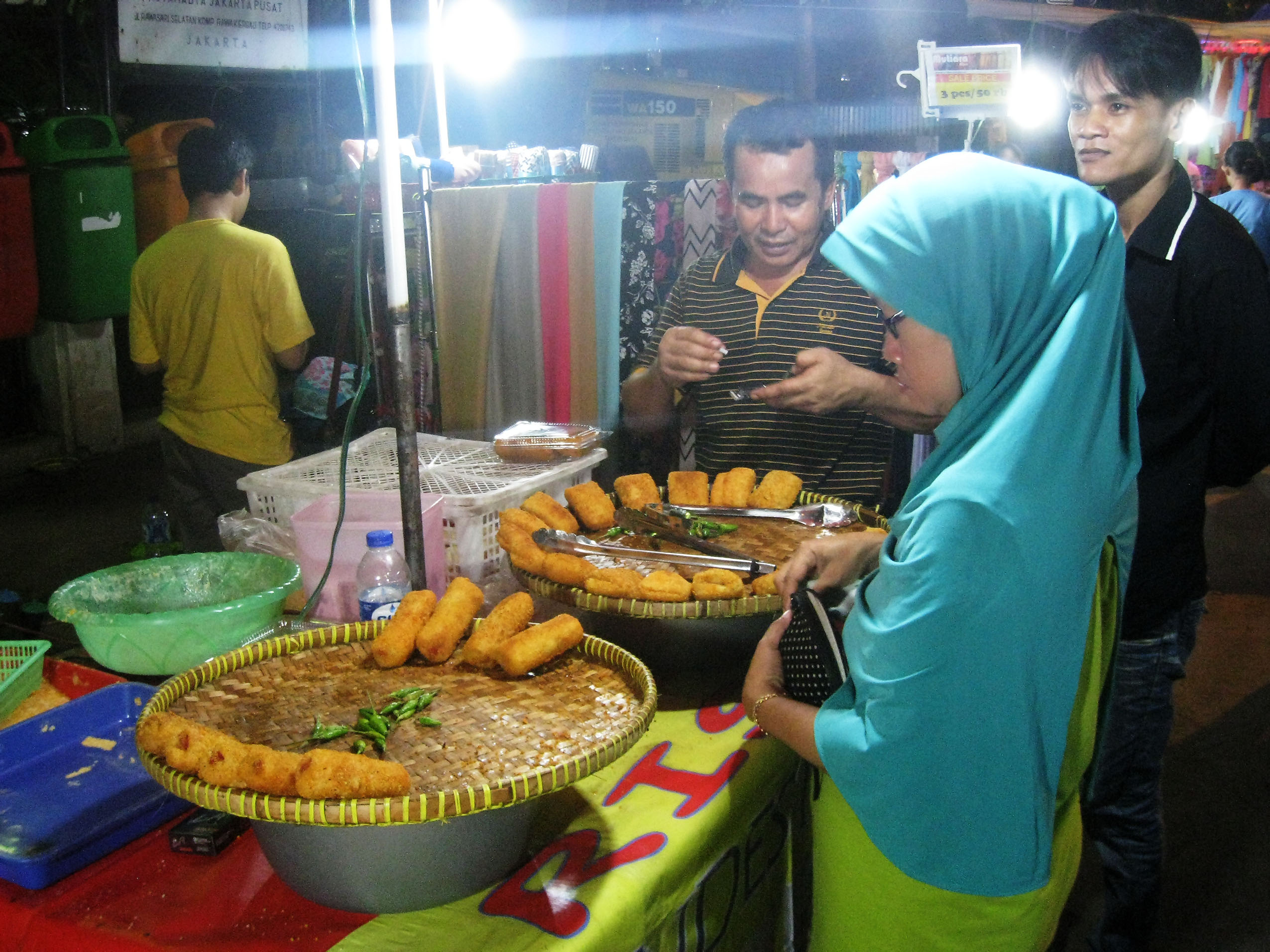
Vendor selling rissole at the pasar malam (night market) in Rawasari, Jakarta

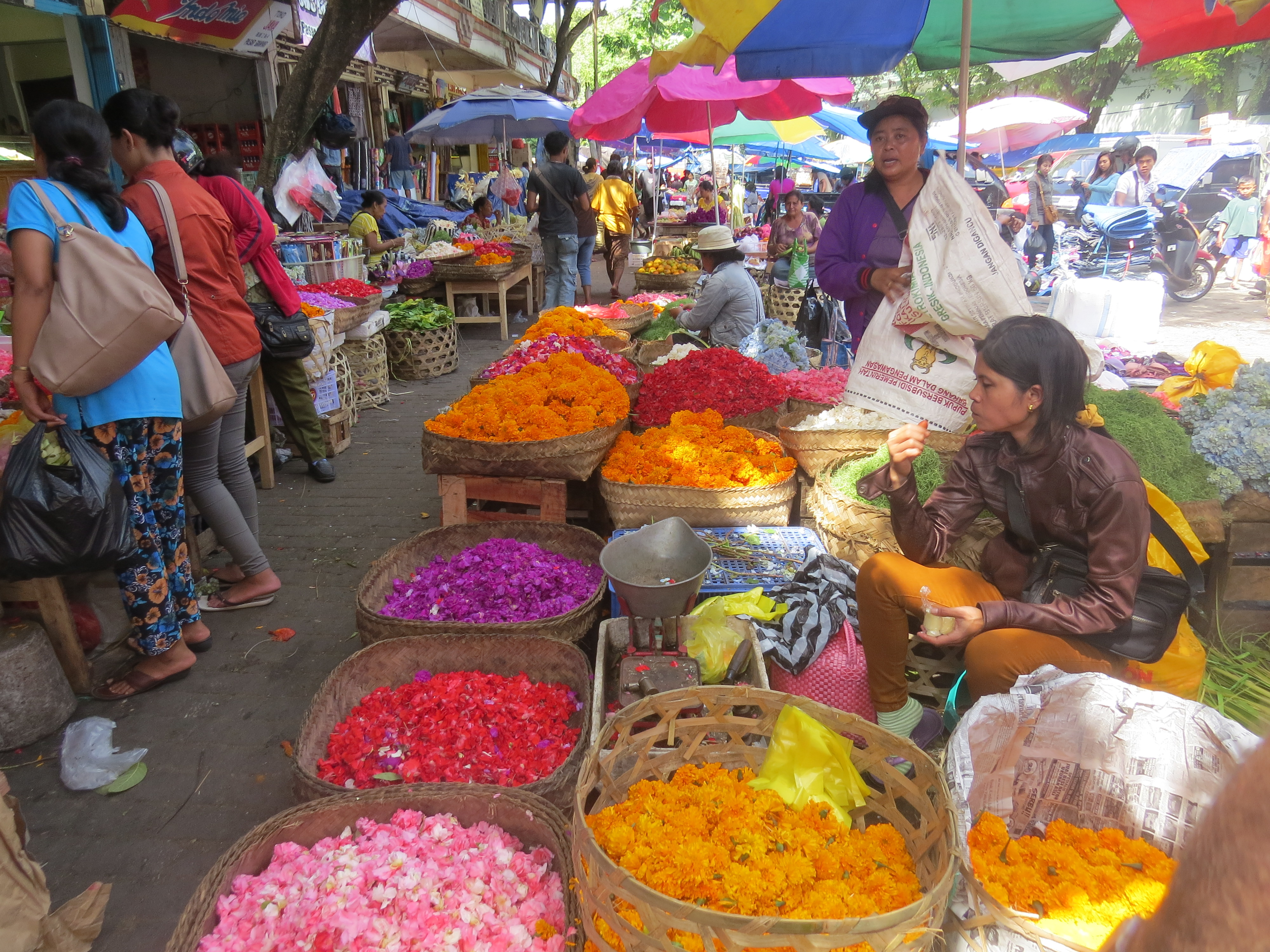
Flower market, Bali

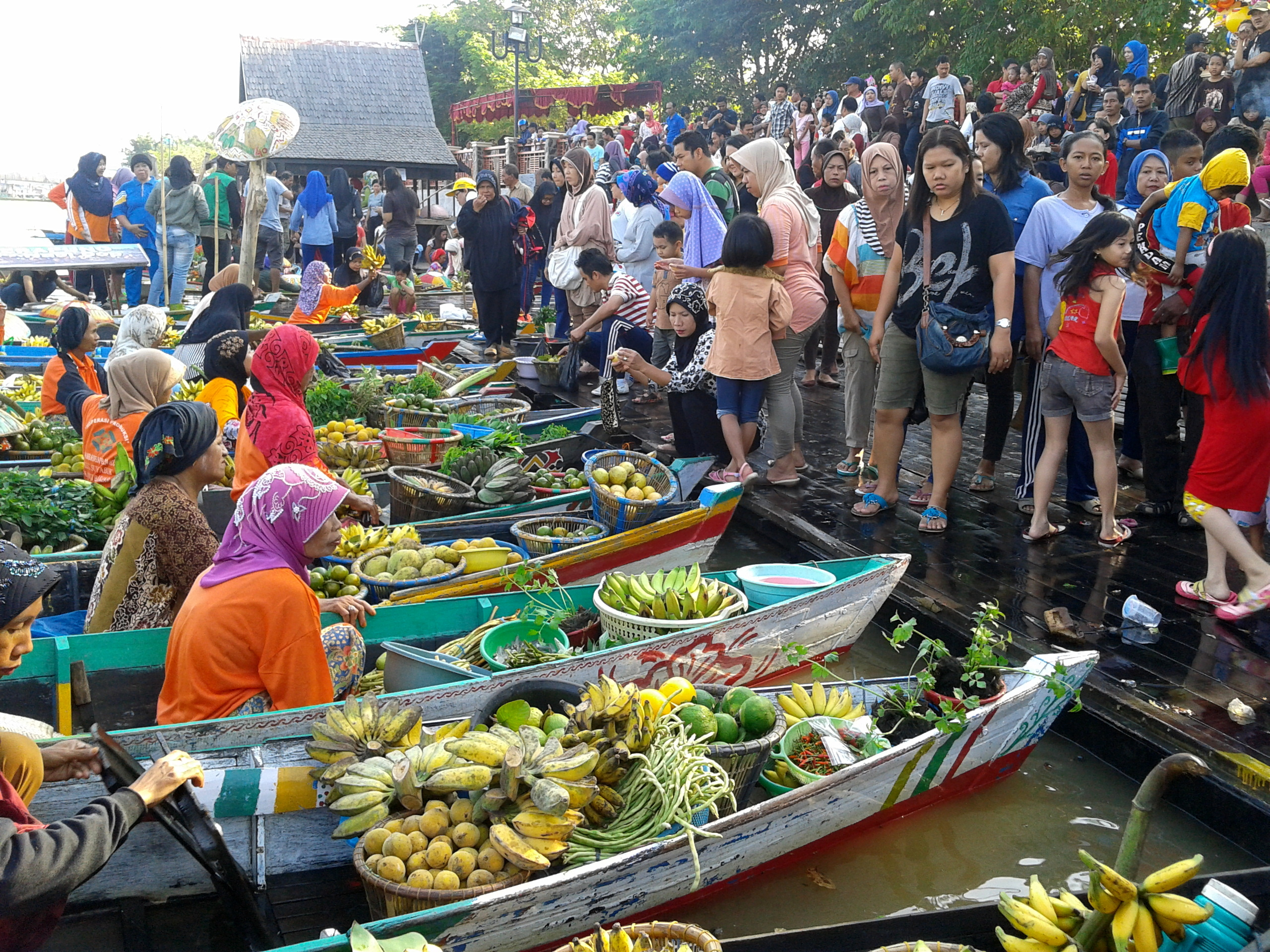
Siring floating market, Banjarmasin

===== Malaysia =====
In Malaysia the term Pasar malam refers to a night market which operates from around 17:00 through to approximately 23:00. Pasar pagi morning wet market is also familiar in Malaysia.

In parts of Malaysia, jungle produce markets trade in indigenous fruits and vegetables, all of which are gaining popularity as consumers switch to pesticide-free food products. Some of the more nutritional indigenous produce includes fruits such as dabai (Canarium odontophyllum), kembayau (Dacryodes rostrata f. cuspidata), durian nyekak (Durio kutejensis), durian kuning (Durio graveolens), letup (Passiflora foetida), kepayang (Pangium edule), and tubu (Pycnarrhena tumetacta) and vegetables such as tengang (Gnetum sp.), riang batu (Begonia chlorosticia), teh kampung (Leucosyke capitellata), and tongkat langit (Musa troglodytarum).

The main markets in Kuala Lumpur include: Pudu market: rated as KL's largest wet market by the Lonely Planet Guide; Central Market, Kuala Lumpur; Chow Kit Wet Market; Kampong Bahru Pasar Minggu; China Town; Petaling Jaya SS2; Bangsar Baru and Lorong Tuanka Abdul Rahman.

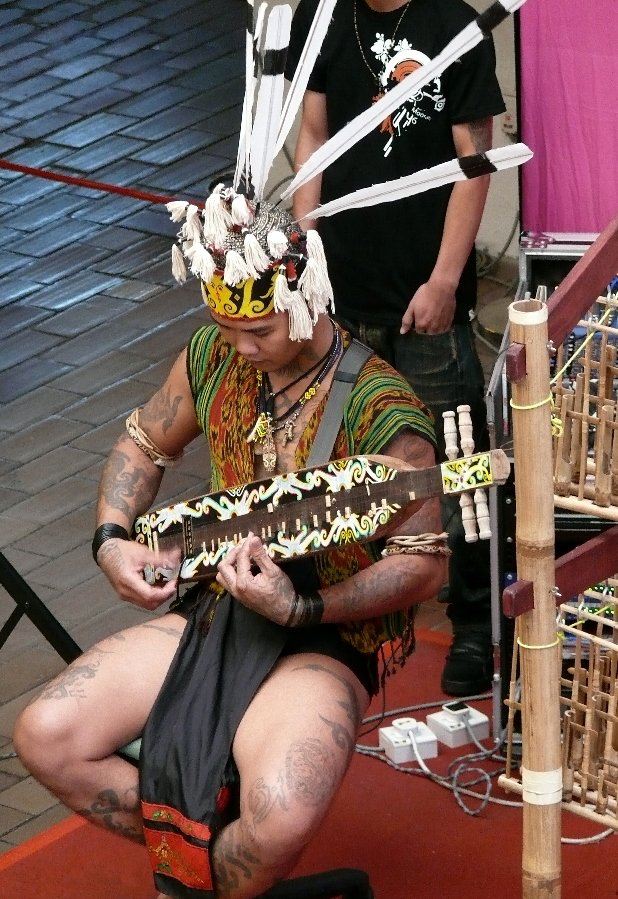
Sapeh player, performing at the Central Market, Kuala Lumpur, Malaysia

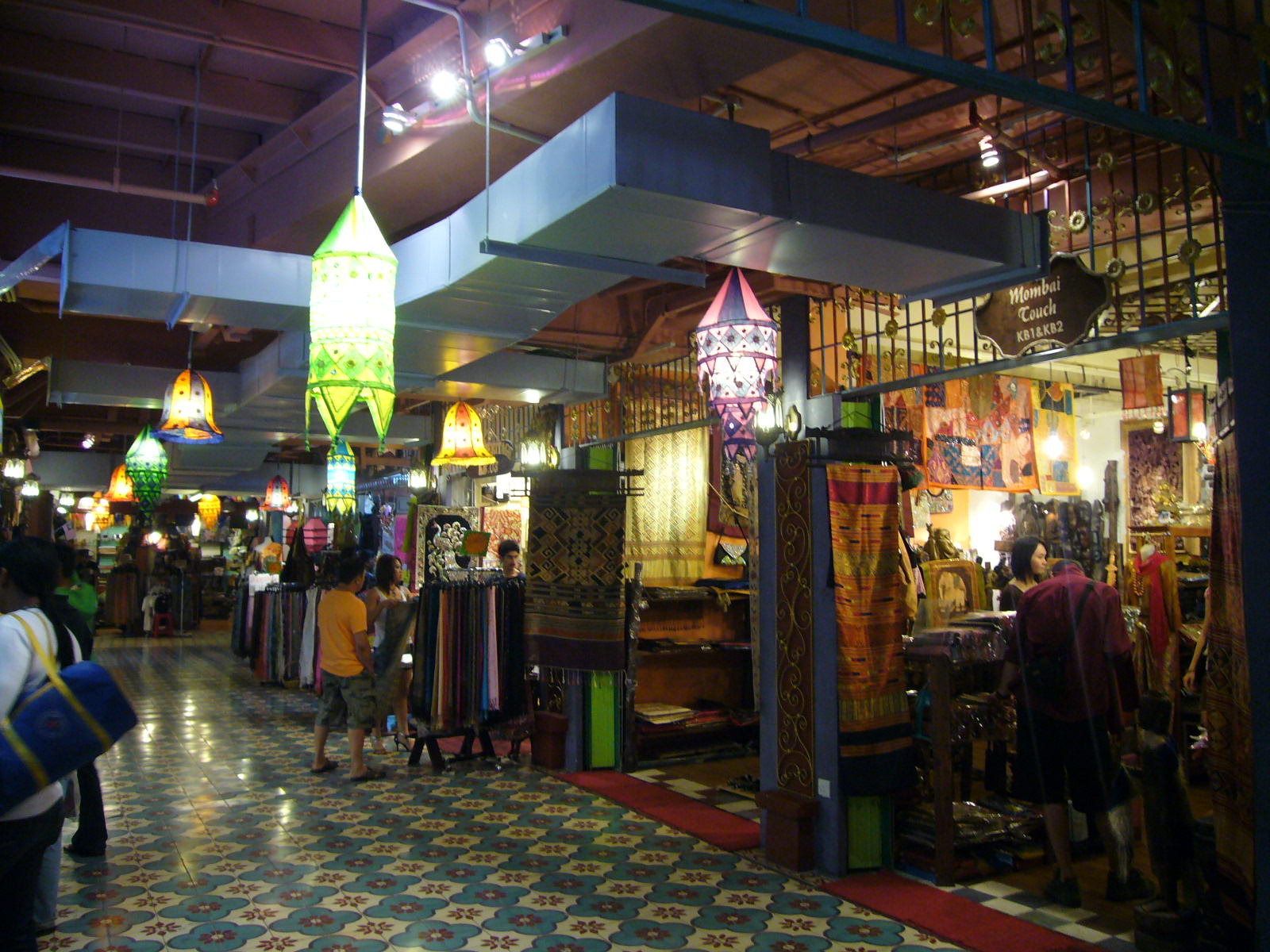
Central Market, Kuala Lumpur, Malaysia (interior)

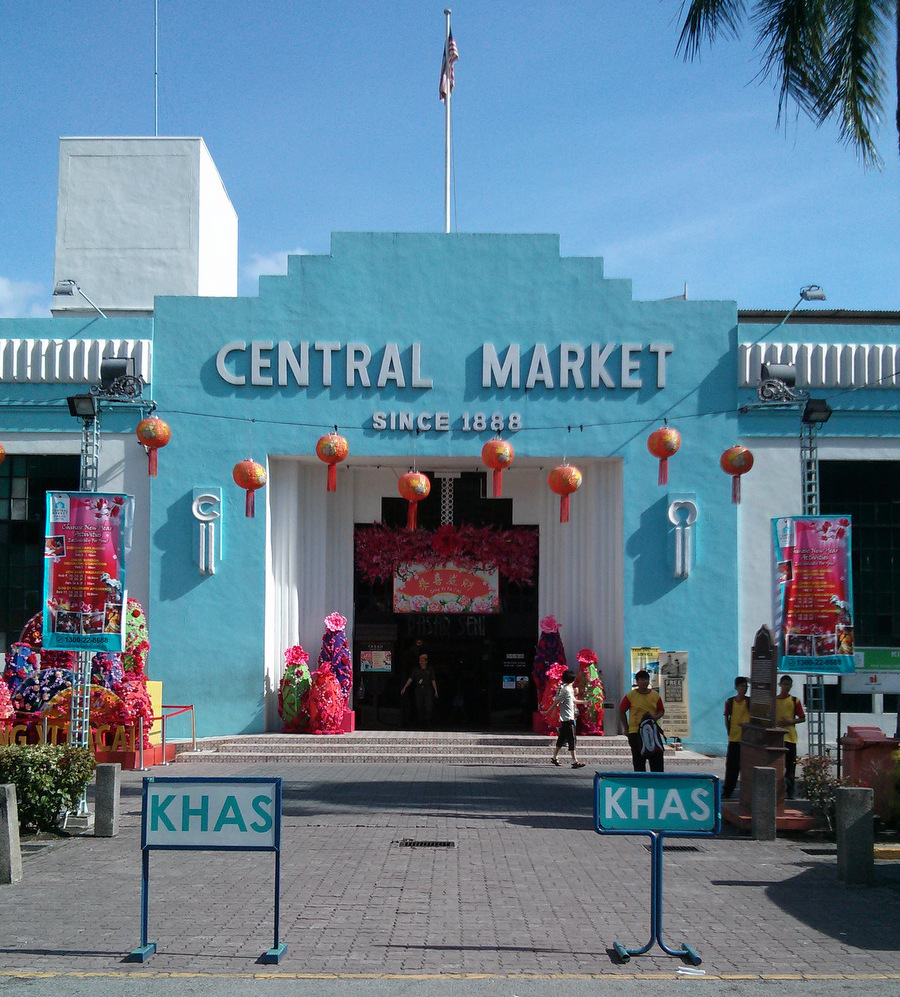
Pasar Seni (Central Market) Kuala Lumpur (exterior)

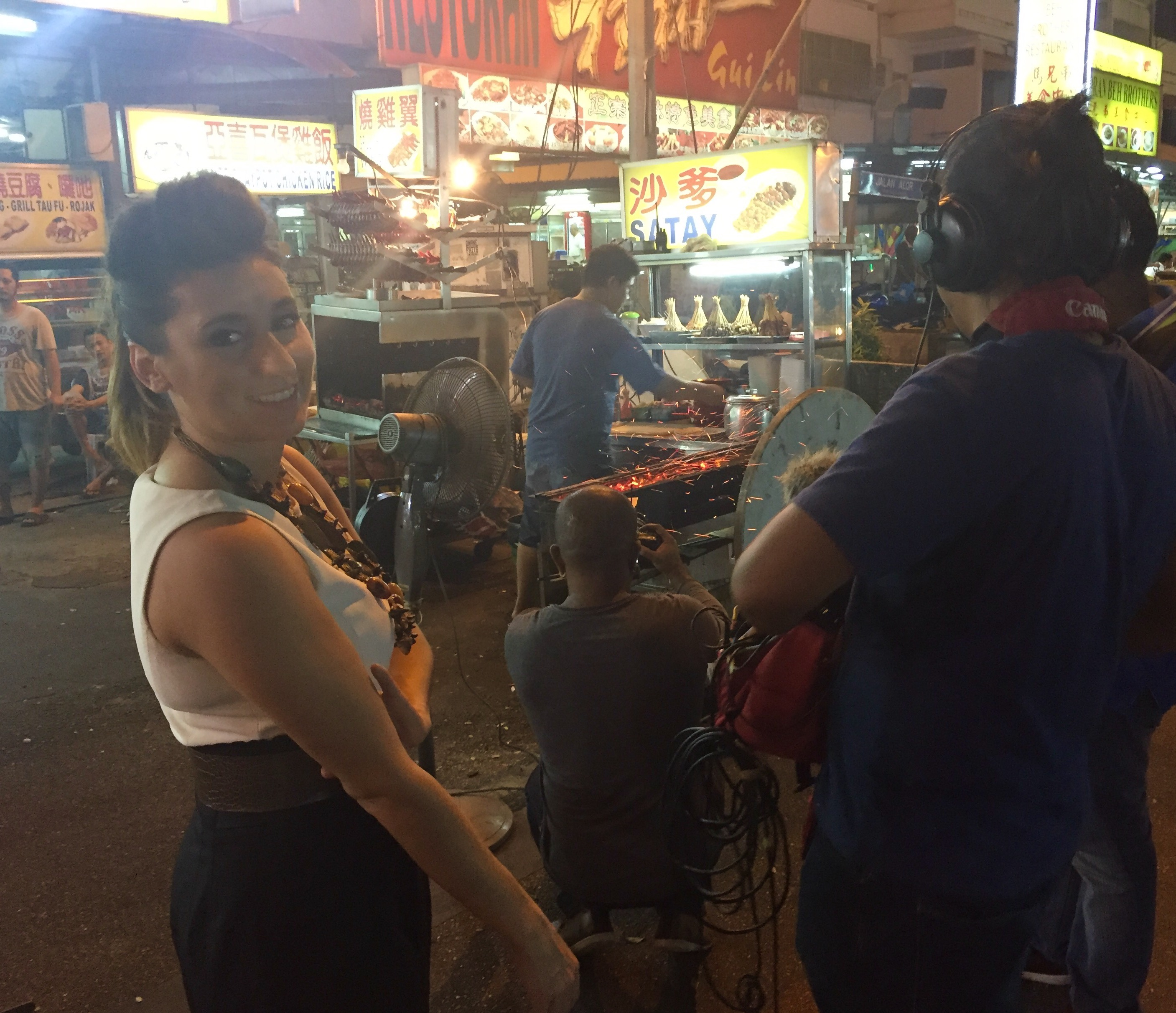
Night market at Jalan Alor, Malaysia

===== Philippines =====
In the Philippines, the word palengke refers to a group of stalls under a covered roof. Locals use palengkes for daily shopping. Public markets are the primary trading centres in cities. In rural districts, public markets are in a state of disrepair. Weekend markets are popular for organic and artisanal foods purchases. In addition, a number of farmers' markets have sprung up. The Cubao Farmers Market, in Quezon City gained international attention following a feature spot on the cable network program, No Reservations, with Anthony Bourdain in 2009.

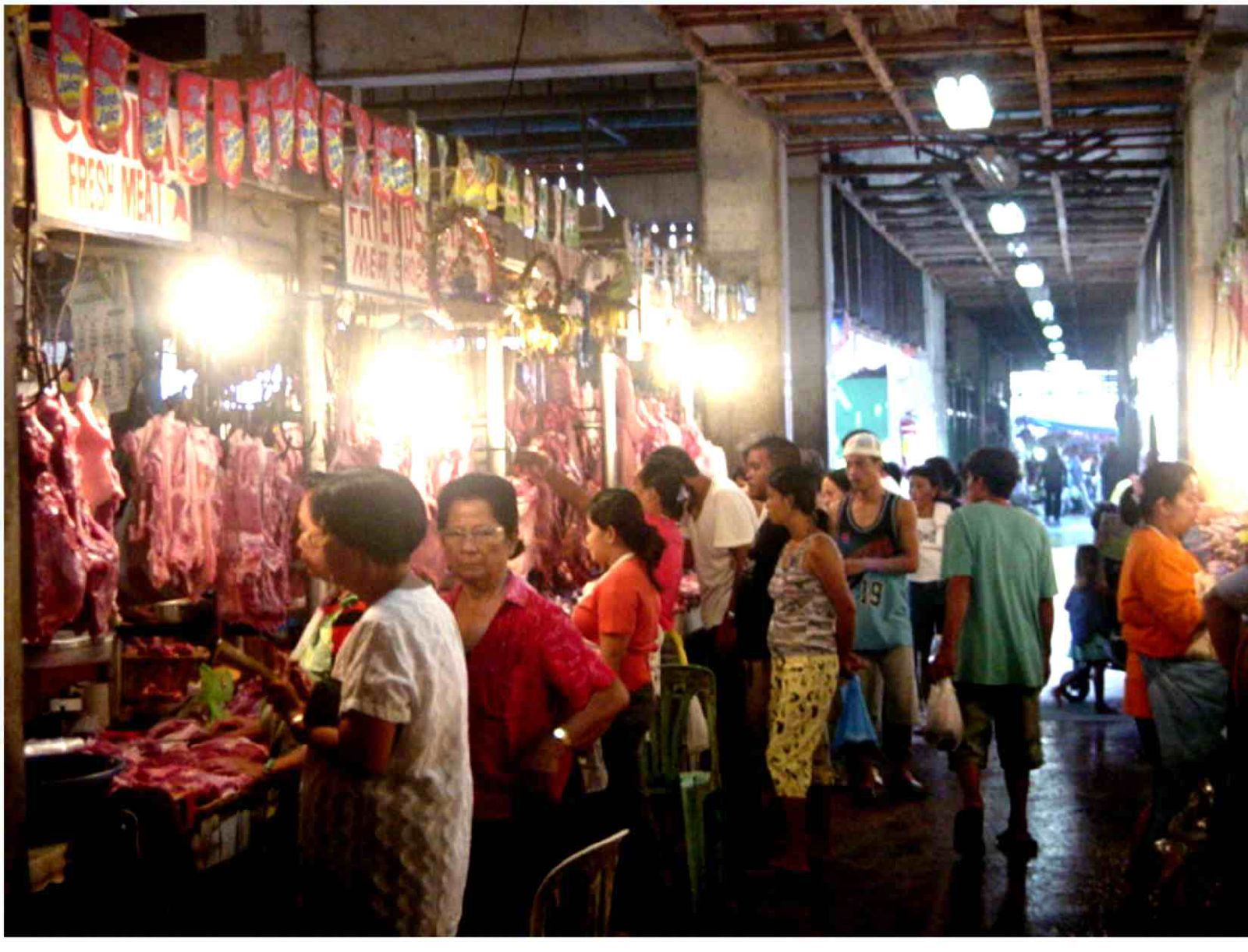
A Palengke, Danao City Philippines

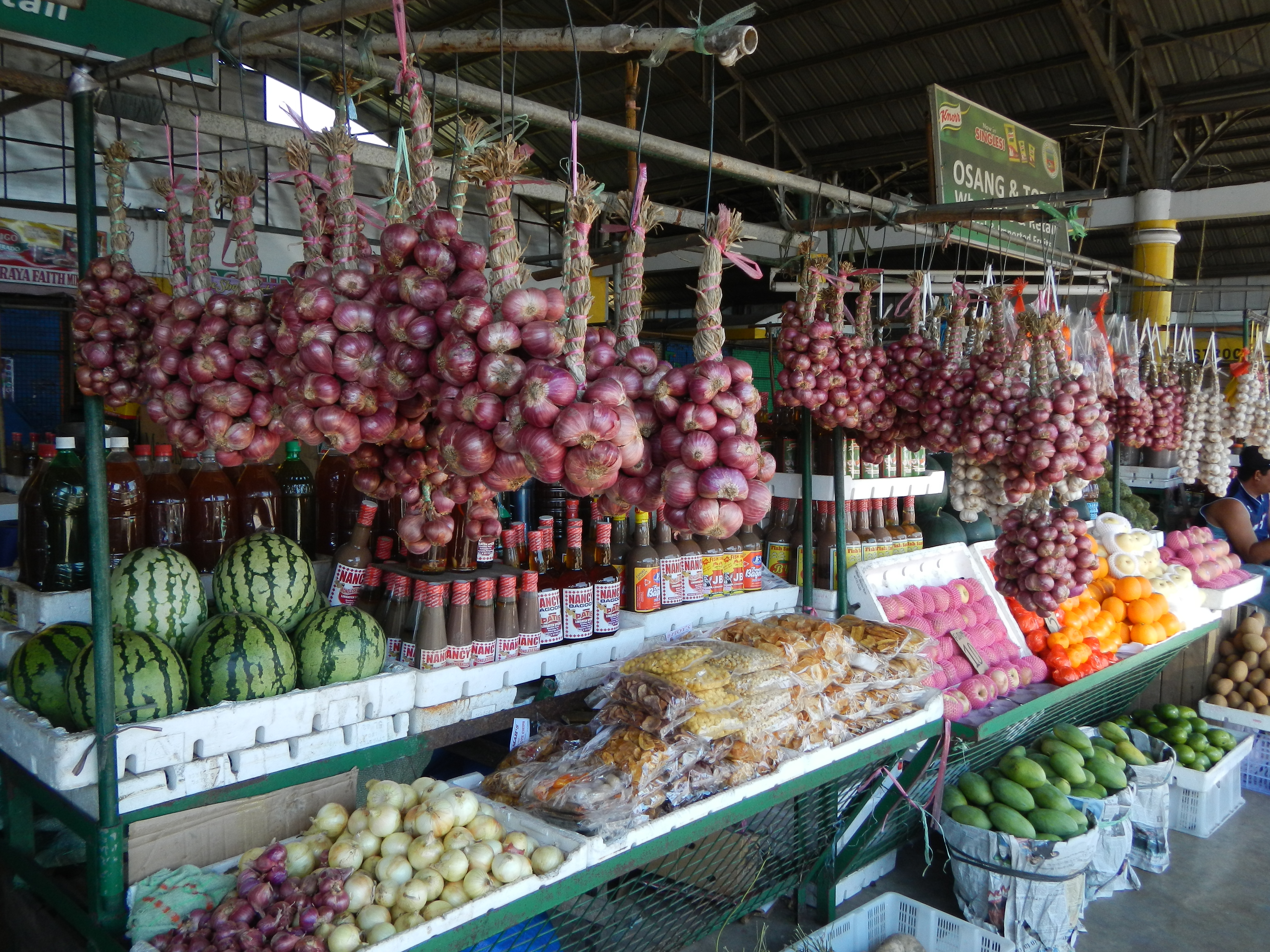
Produce market, Pangasinan

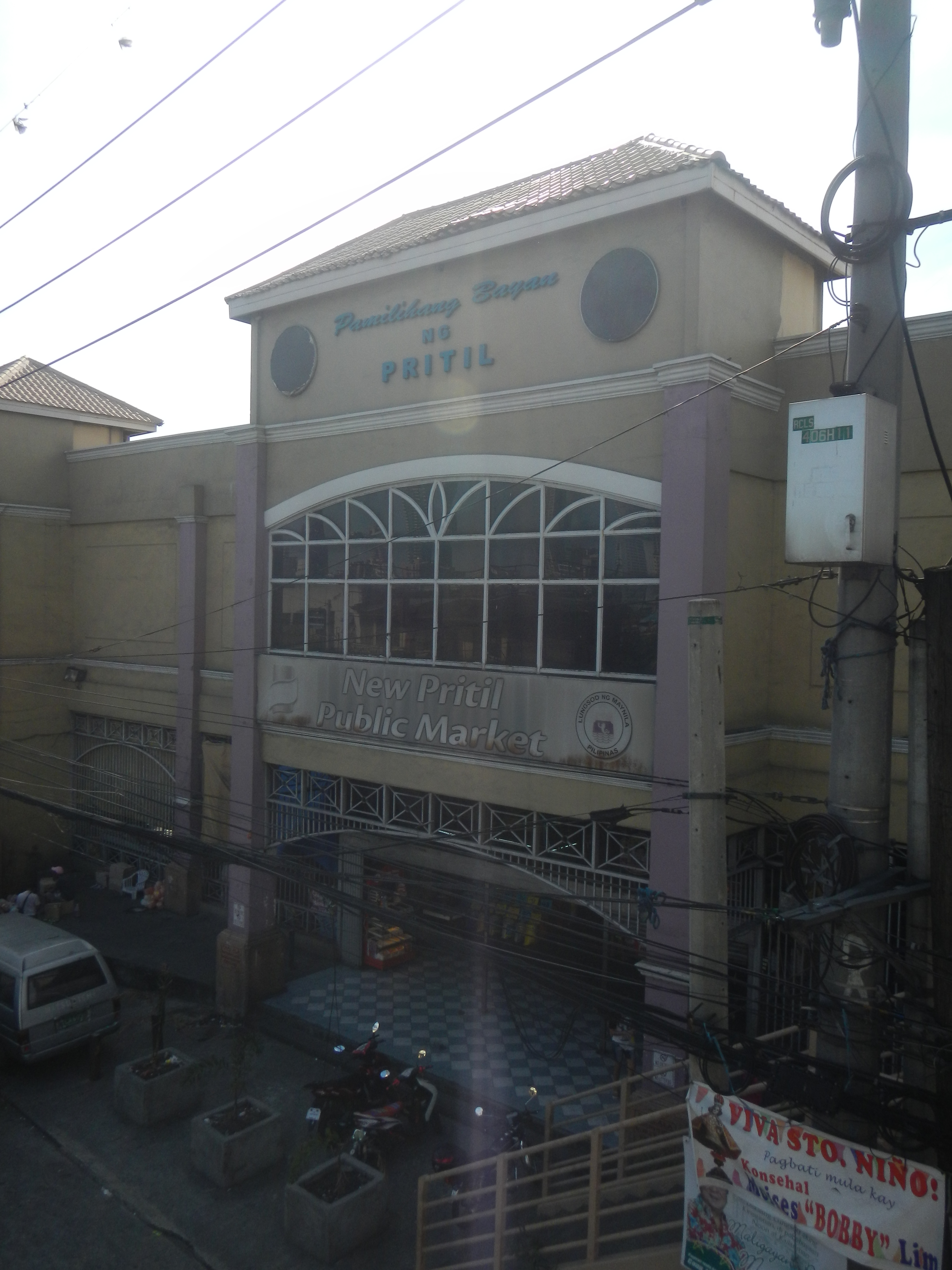
New Pritil Public Market, Manila

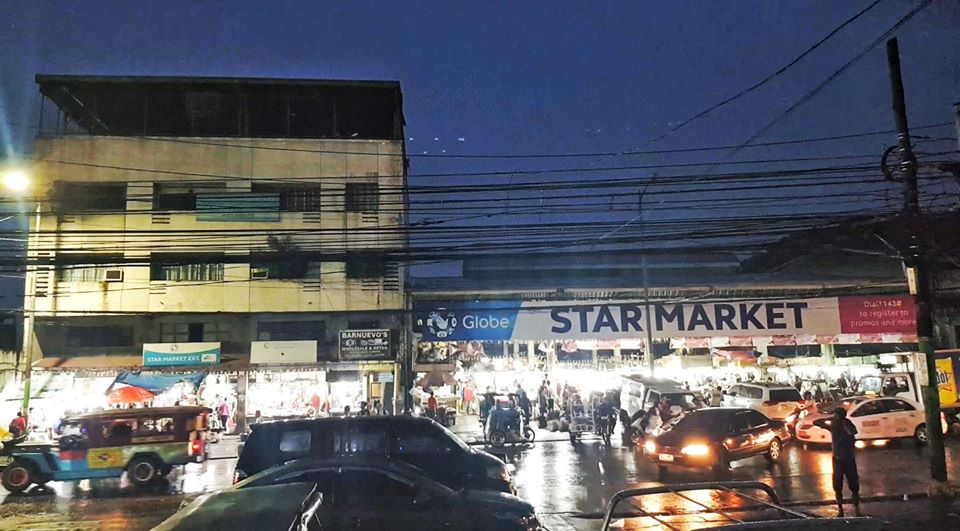
A palengke in Novaliches, Quezon City

===== Thailand =====
====== Bangkok ======
Bangkok's markets are popular with both locals and visitors. Floating markets can be found in Bangkok and elsewhere. Vendors not only sell fresh produce from boats, but will also cook meals and snacks on their vessels for sale to the public. These floating markets are a popular tourist attraction.

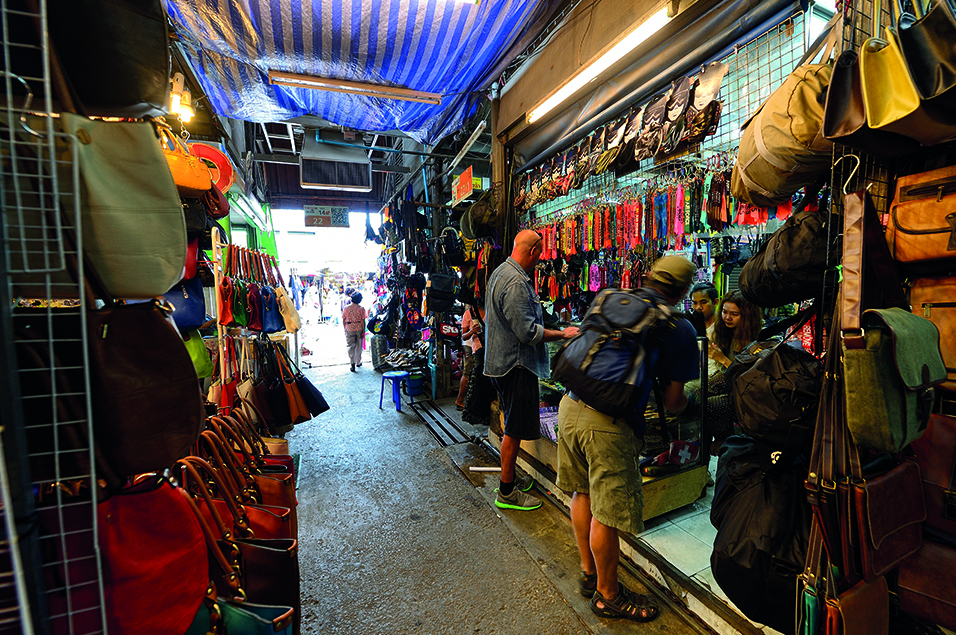
Bangkok's Chatuchak Market, one of the largest markets in the world

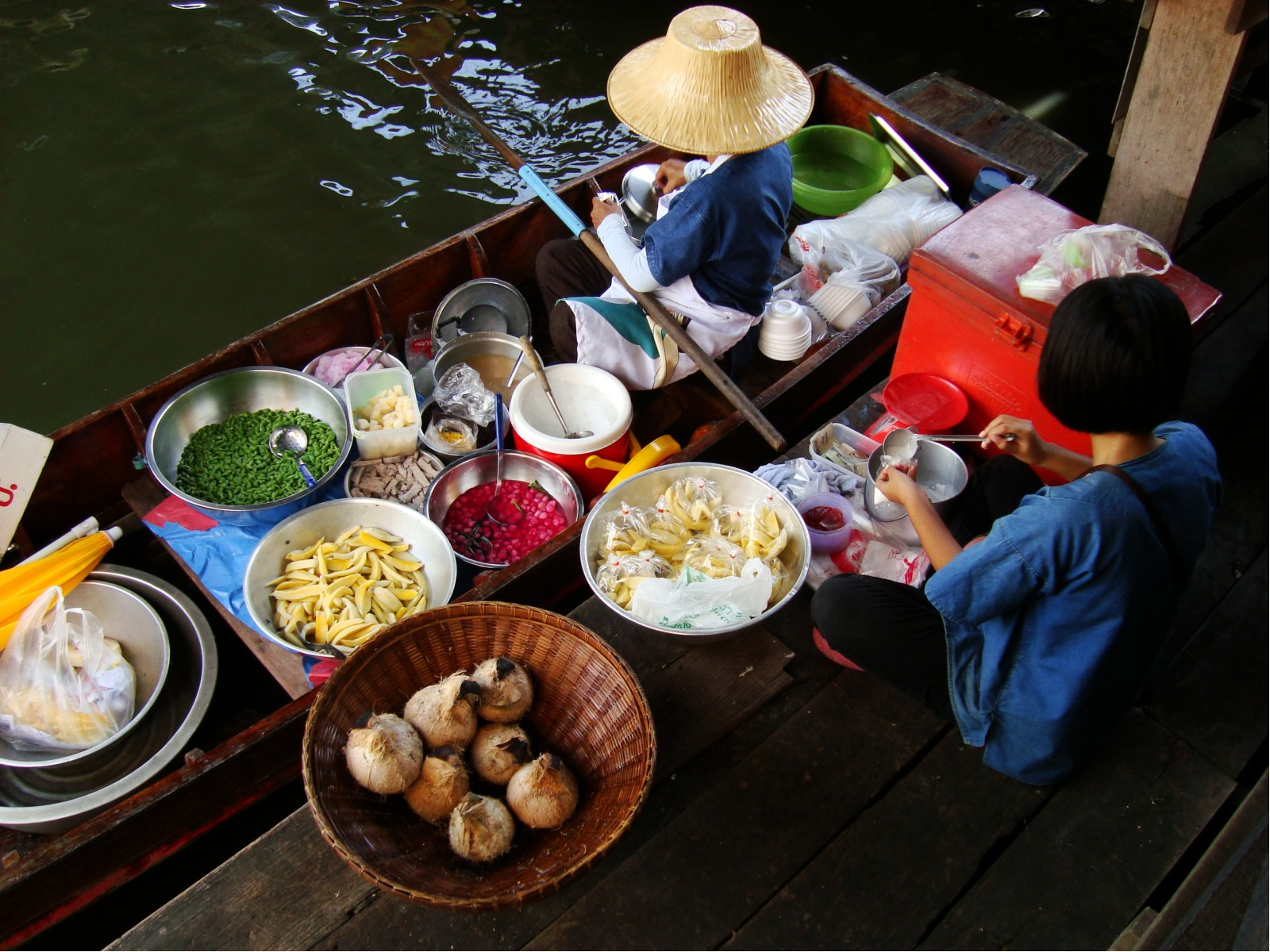
Food vendors at Taling Chan Floating Market, Taling Chan District

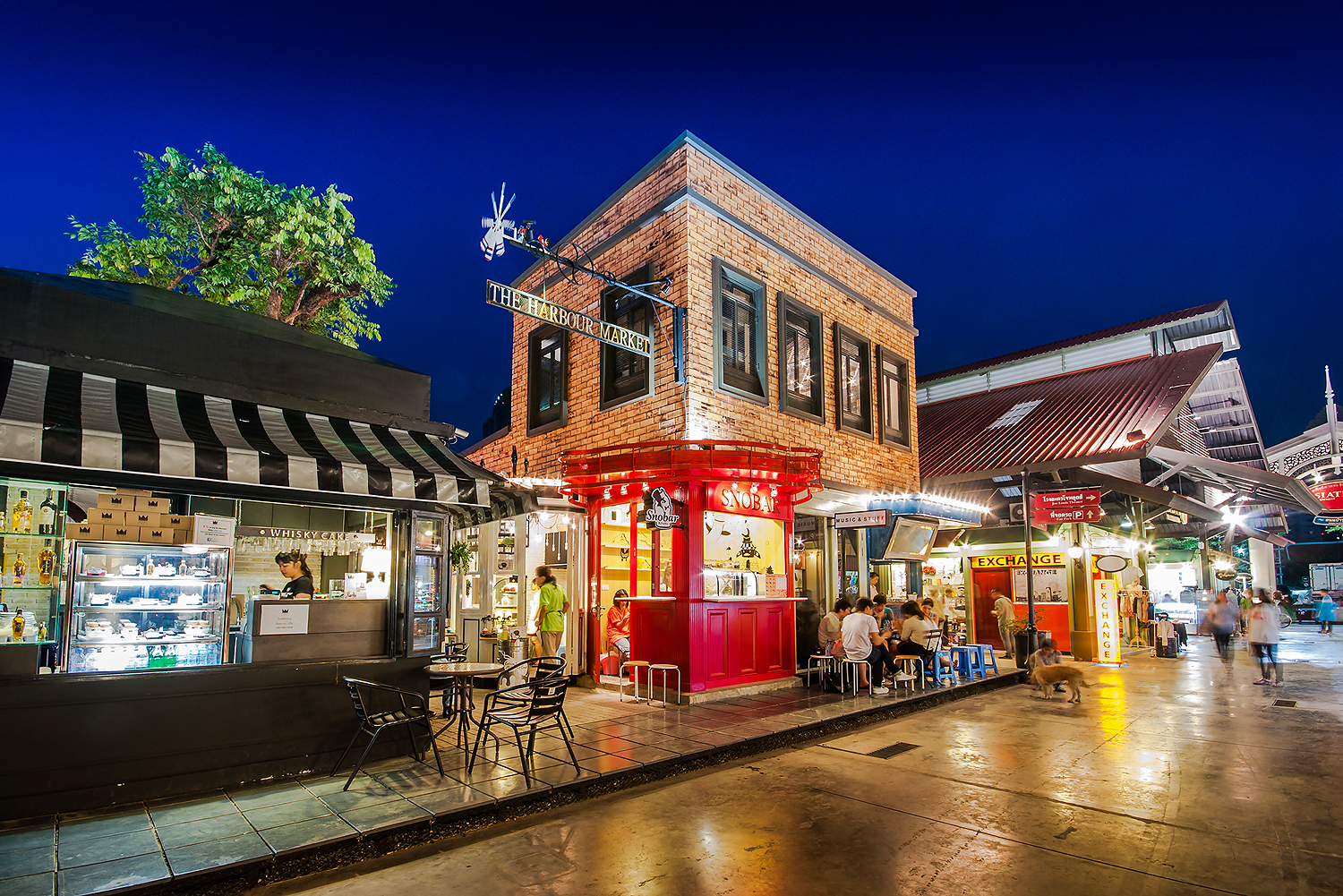
The Harbour Market, The Riverfront

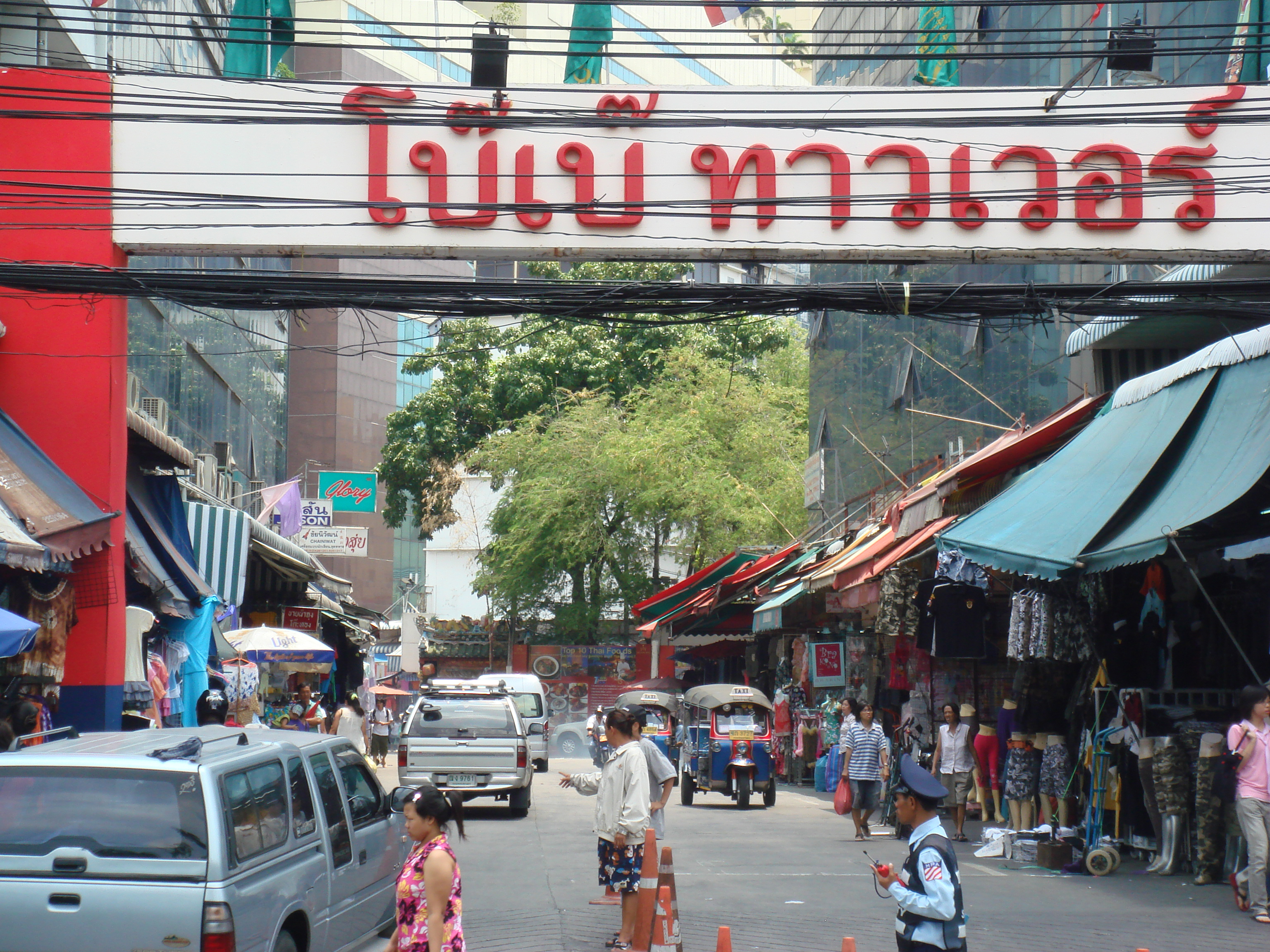
Entrance to Bobae Tower Market

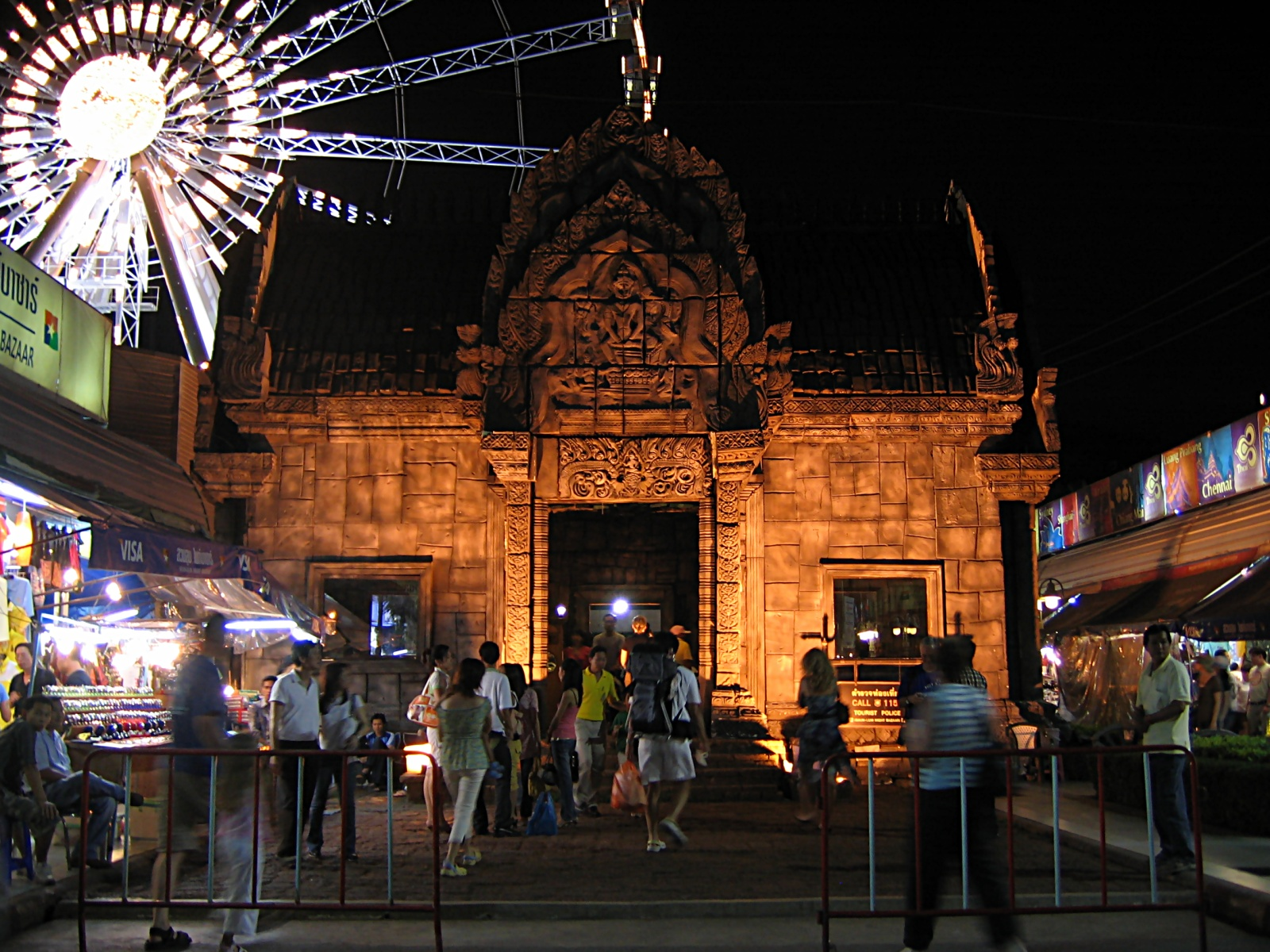
Suan Lum Night Bazaar

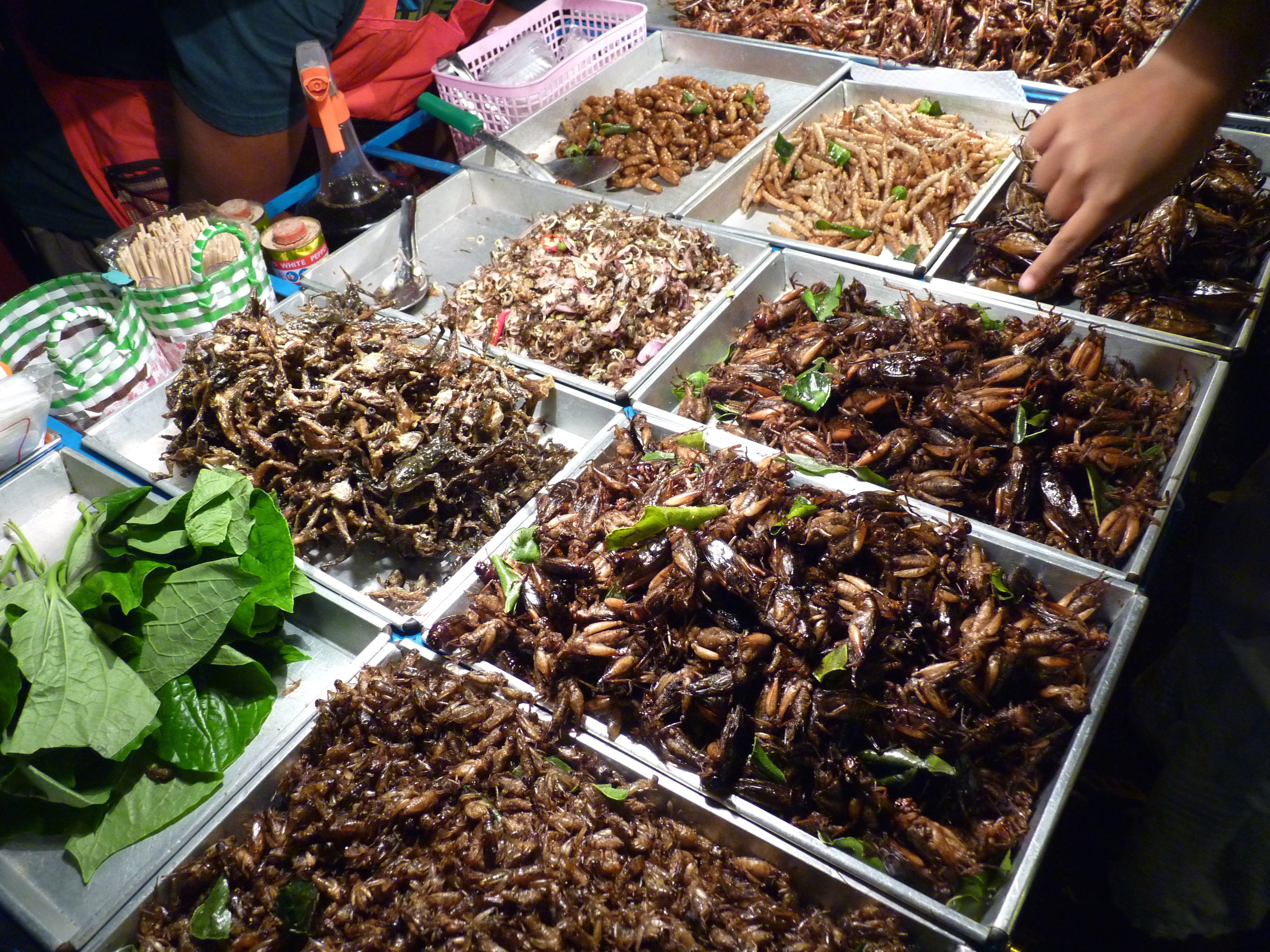
Insect vendor in Bangkok

==== West Asia ====
In the West Asia, markets are known as bazaars or souks. The earliest bazaars are believed to have originated in Persia, and spread to the rest of the Middle East and Europe from there. Documentary sources suggest that zoning policies confined trading to particular parts of a city from around 3,000 BCE, creating the conditions necessary for the emergence of a bazaar.

In the ancient cities of Iran, three types of bazaar have been identified; periodic bazaars, urban bazaars, and local bazaars. Periodic bazaars could be organised anywhere and typically took place in open spaces and traded in specialities such as handicrafts, clothing, livestock and foodstuffs. These took place at regular intervals such as monthly or yearly. Urban bazaars were held in covered public walkways with shops or stores on both sides. Its architecture varied according to local conditions including climate, culture and the economic power of the city in which it was situated. Urban bazaars were places for commercial, social and cultural interactions. Local bazaars, held in specific districts of larger cities, were similar to urban bazaars, but on a smaller scale with fewer shops.

In pre-Islamic Arabia, markets took on two forms, permanent urban markets and temporary, seasonal markets often located in regional districts. Gradually, markets or bazaars gradually became central features of urban towns and were relocated to the city centre. Permanent markets are mentioned frequently in ancient literary sources.

===== Iran =====
Markets in Iran with historical or architectural significance include:

- Grand Bazaar, Tehran
- Bazaar of Kashan, Iran
- Bazaar of Isfahan, Iran – historic site which dates to Saljuqid and Safavid era and is the longest roofed market in the world.
- Bazaar of Tabriz, Iran – historic site that originally developed along the ancient silk routes; listed as a World Heritage Site
- Vakil Bazaar in Shiraz, Iran
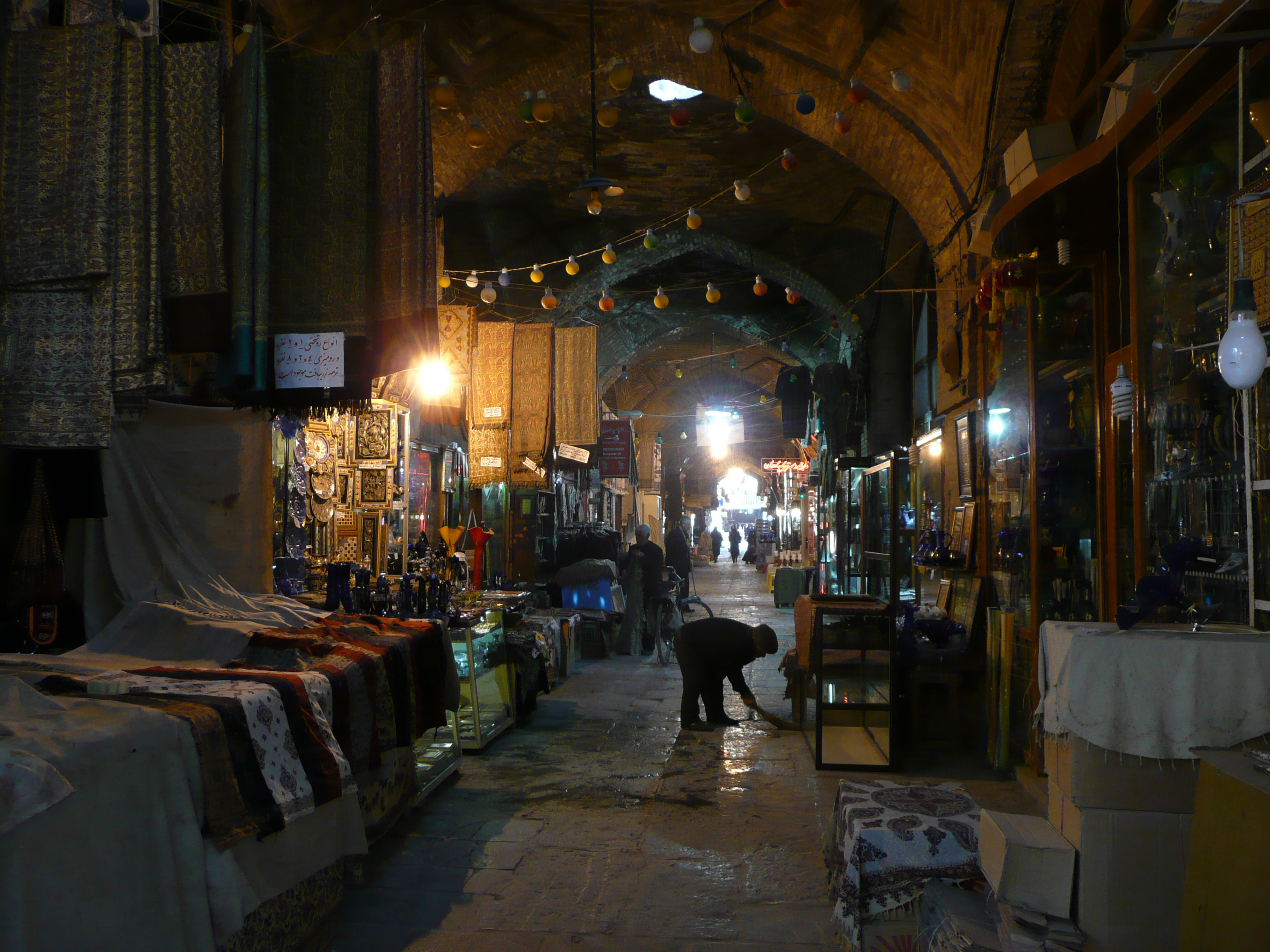
Isfahan Bazaar, Iran

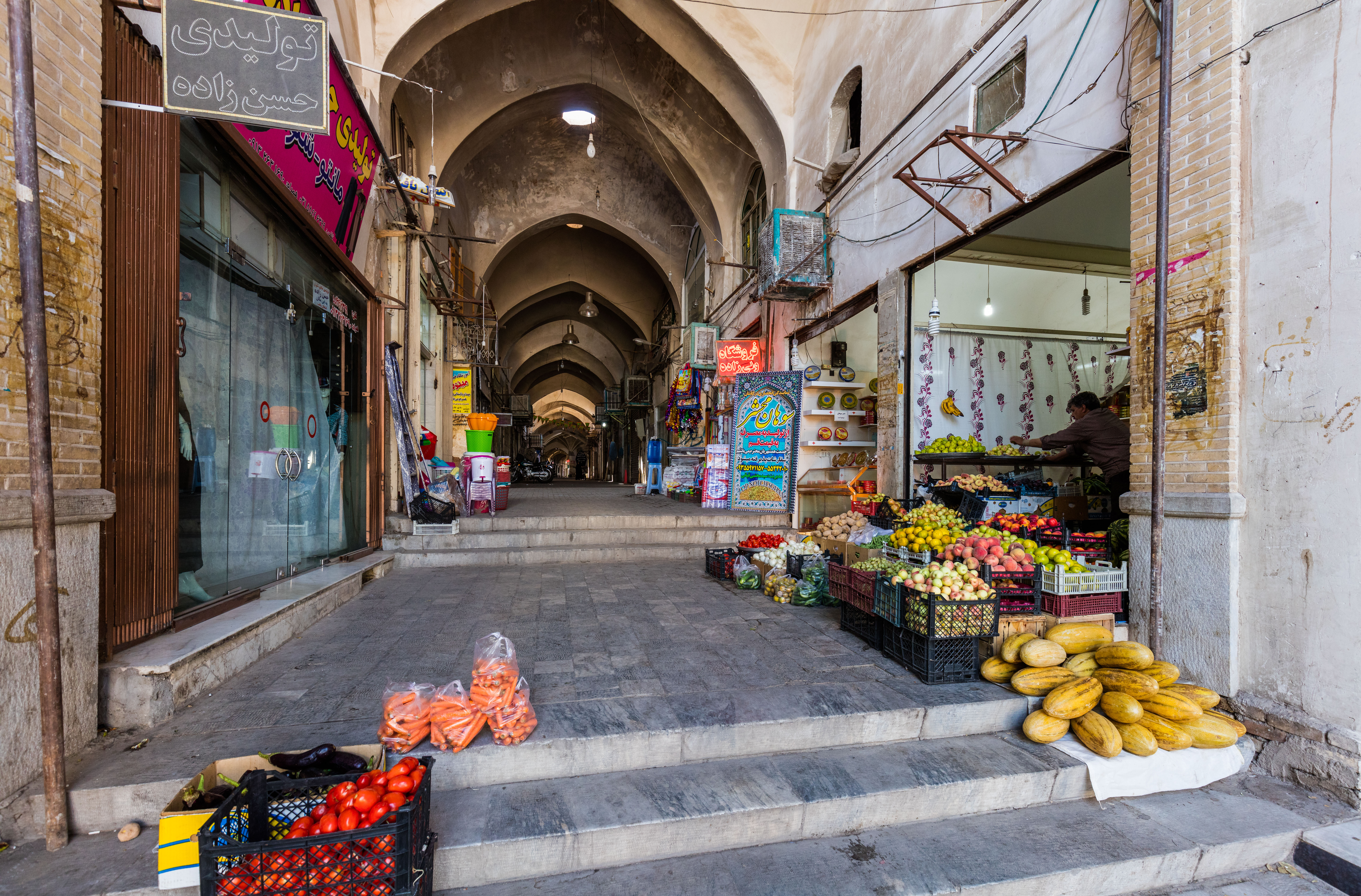
Bazaar of Kashan, Kashan, Iran

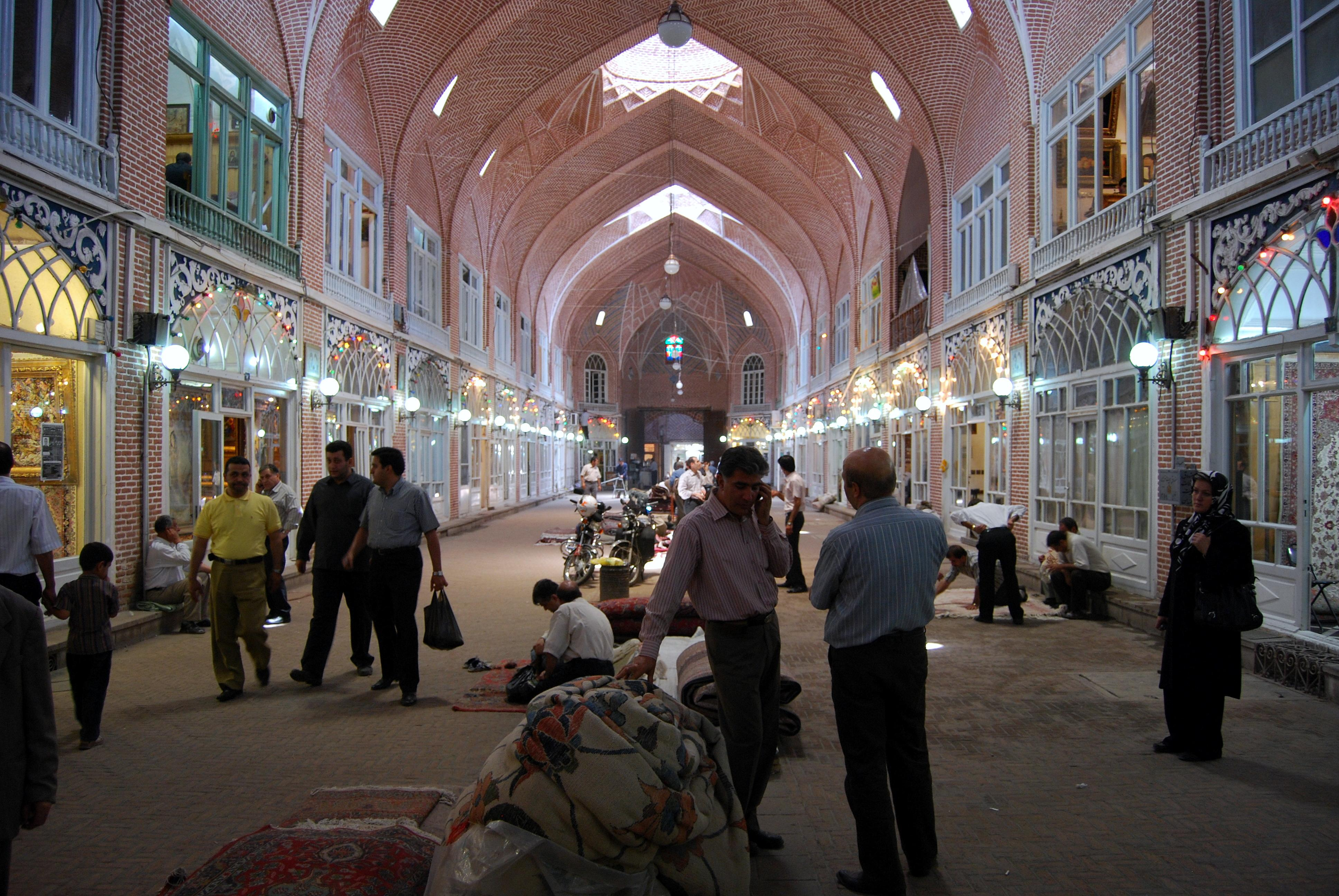
Carpet Bazaar of Tabriz, Iran

===== Israel =====
The Hebrew word for market is shuk (plural: shvakim), and food markets are found in every major city. Famous markets include the Carmel Market in Tel Aviv and Mahane Yehuda Market in Jerusalem.

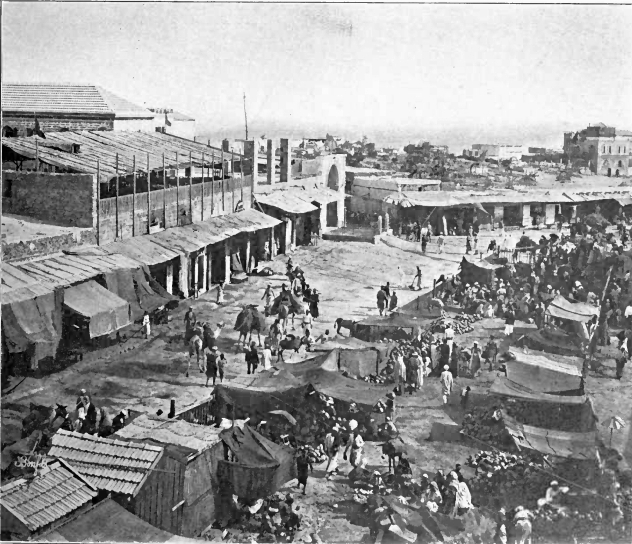
Jaffa Bazaar in 1906

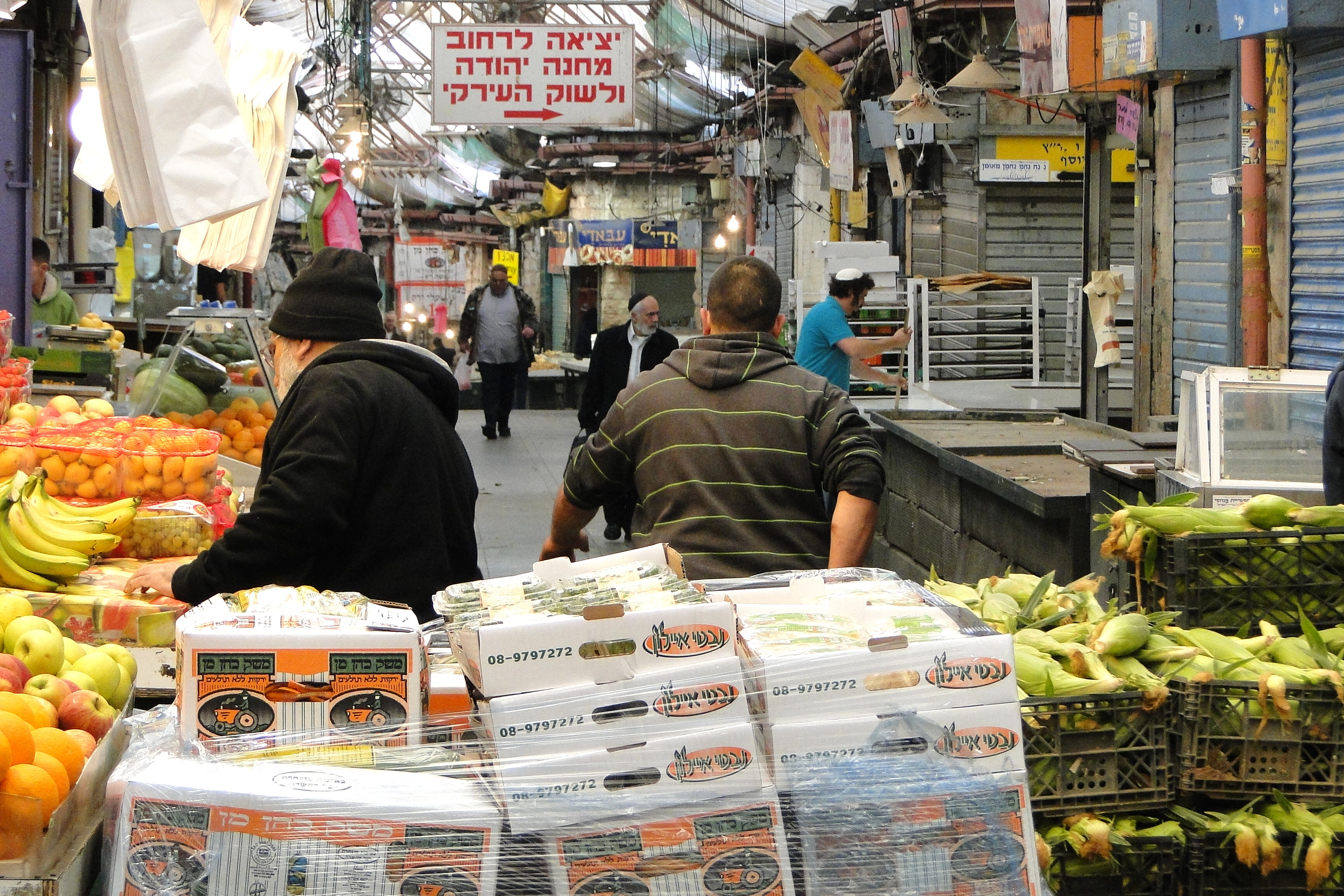
Early-Morning Scene in Mahane Yehuda Market, Jerusalem

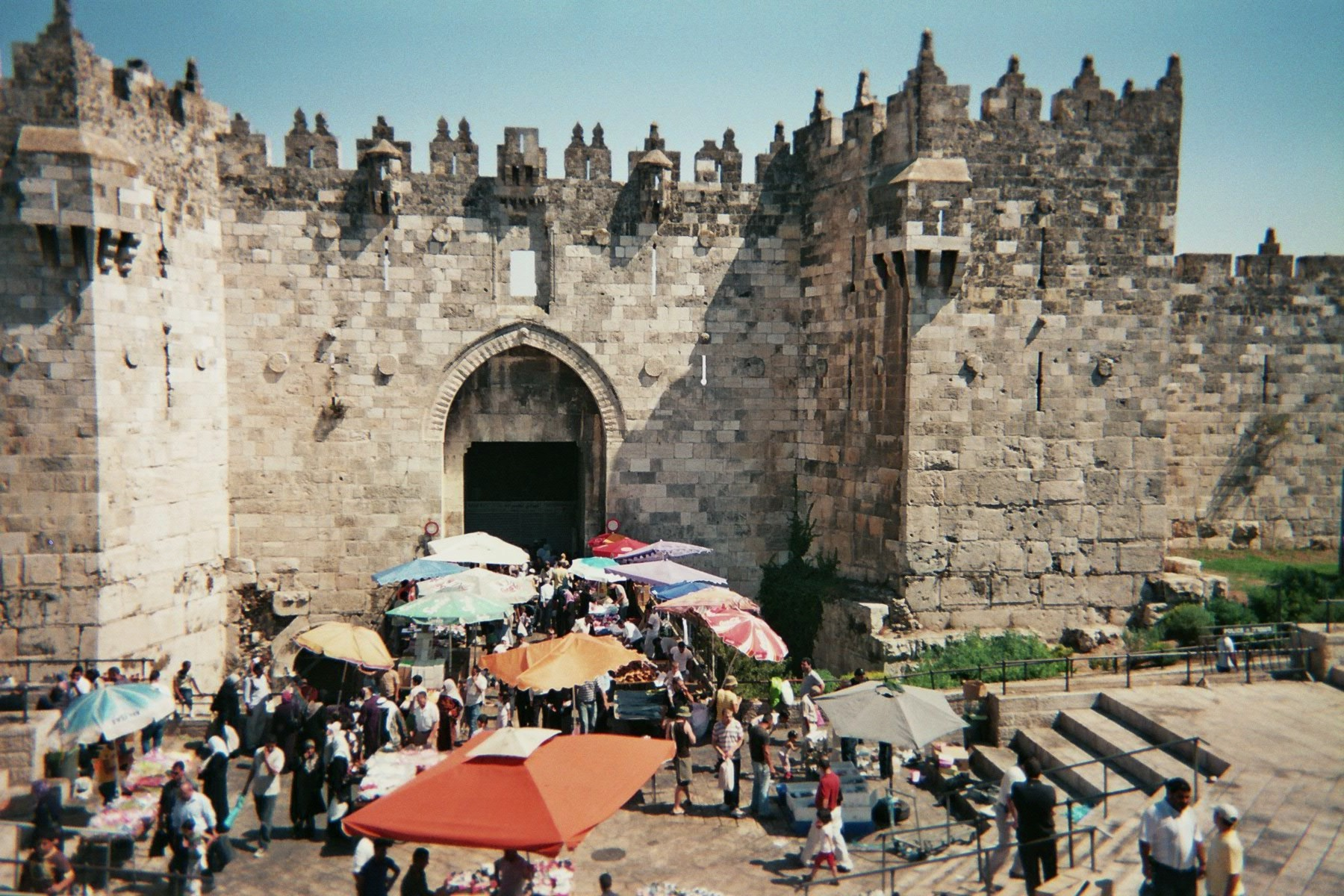
Entrance Damascus Gate Market

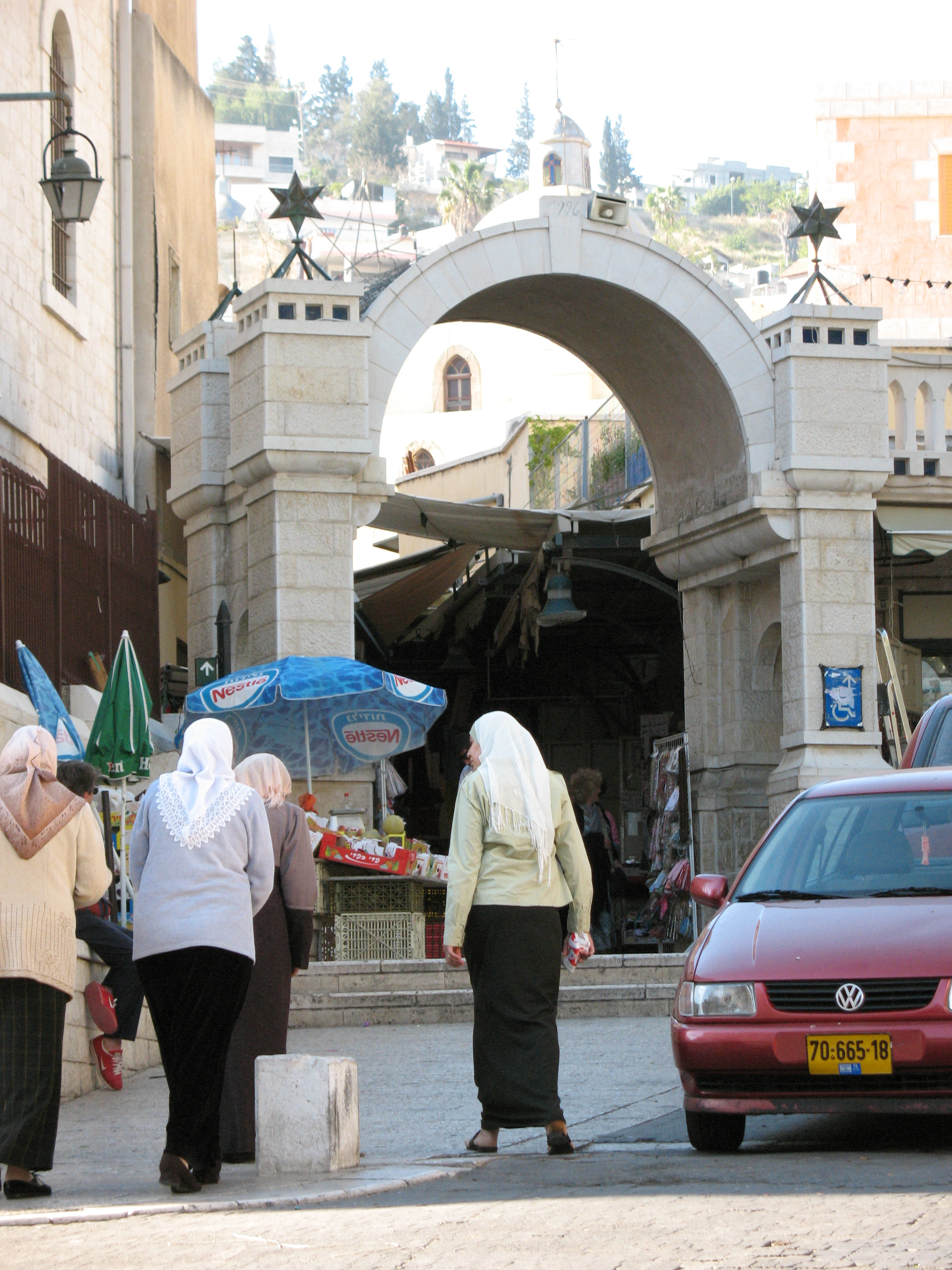
Entrance to Nazareth market

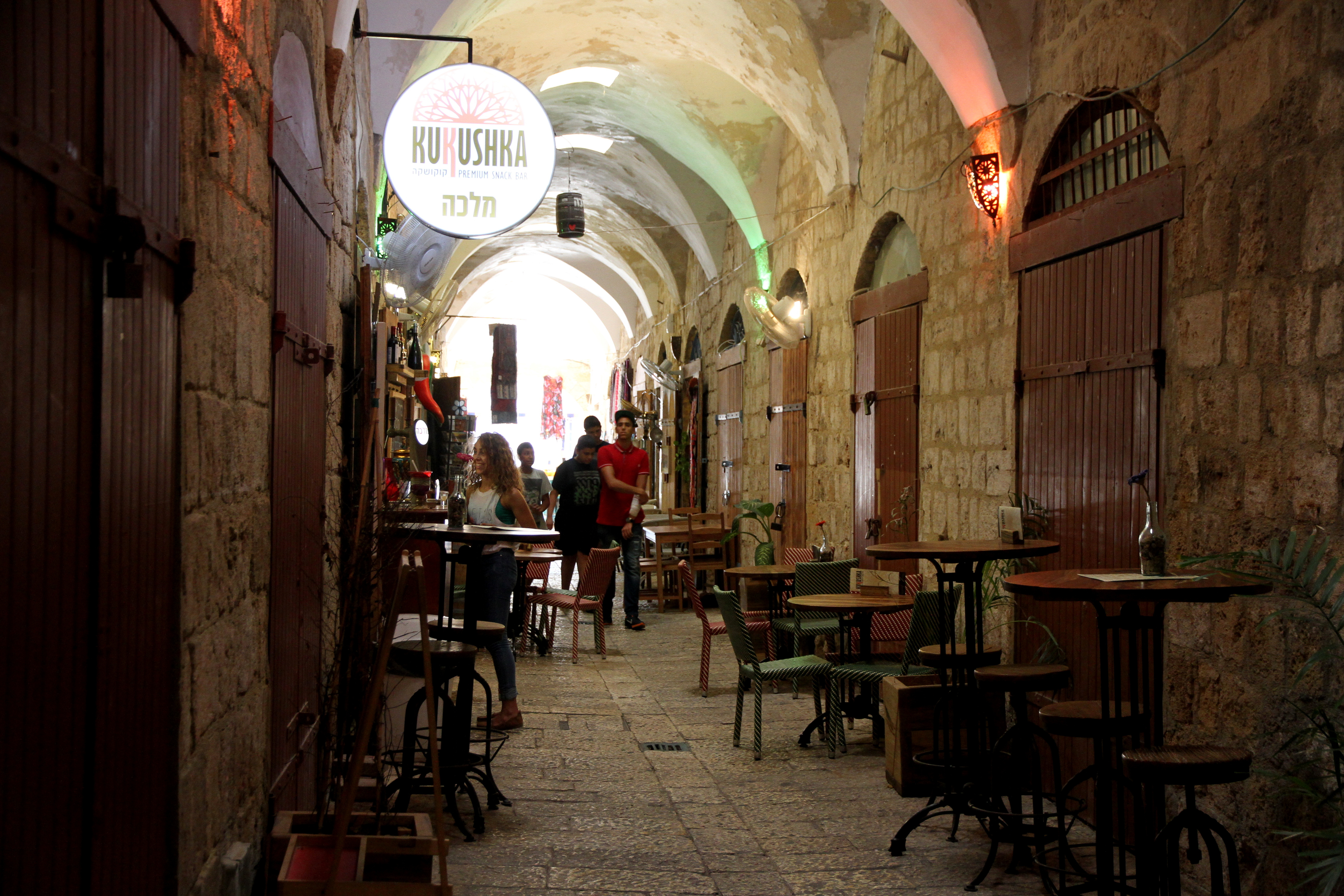
Turkish Bazaar, Acre (Akko)

===== Turkey =====
Street markets are called pazar in Turkish and usually named after the name of the day since they are only installed at around 05:00 on that specific day and ended on same day around 18:00, in every week. Every district in Turkey has its own open market where people can choose and buy from a very wide range of products, from fresh fruits and vegetables to clothing, from traditional white cheese (which some people may consider feta-like), to household items. In Istanbul area Wednesday Pazar of Fatih district, Tuesday Pazar of Kadıköy, and Friday Pazar of Ortaköy are the most popular and crowded open markets of the city.

A market with shops or permanent stalls is called çarşı and may include covered streets that are closed at night. Famous examples include the Kapalıçarşı (Grand Bazaar) and Spice Bazaar in Istanbul.

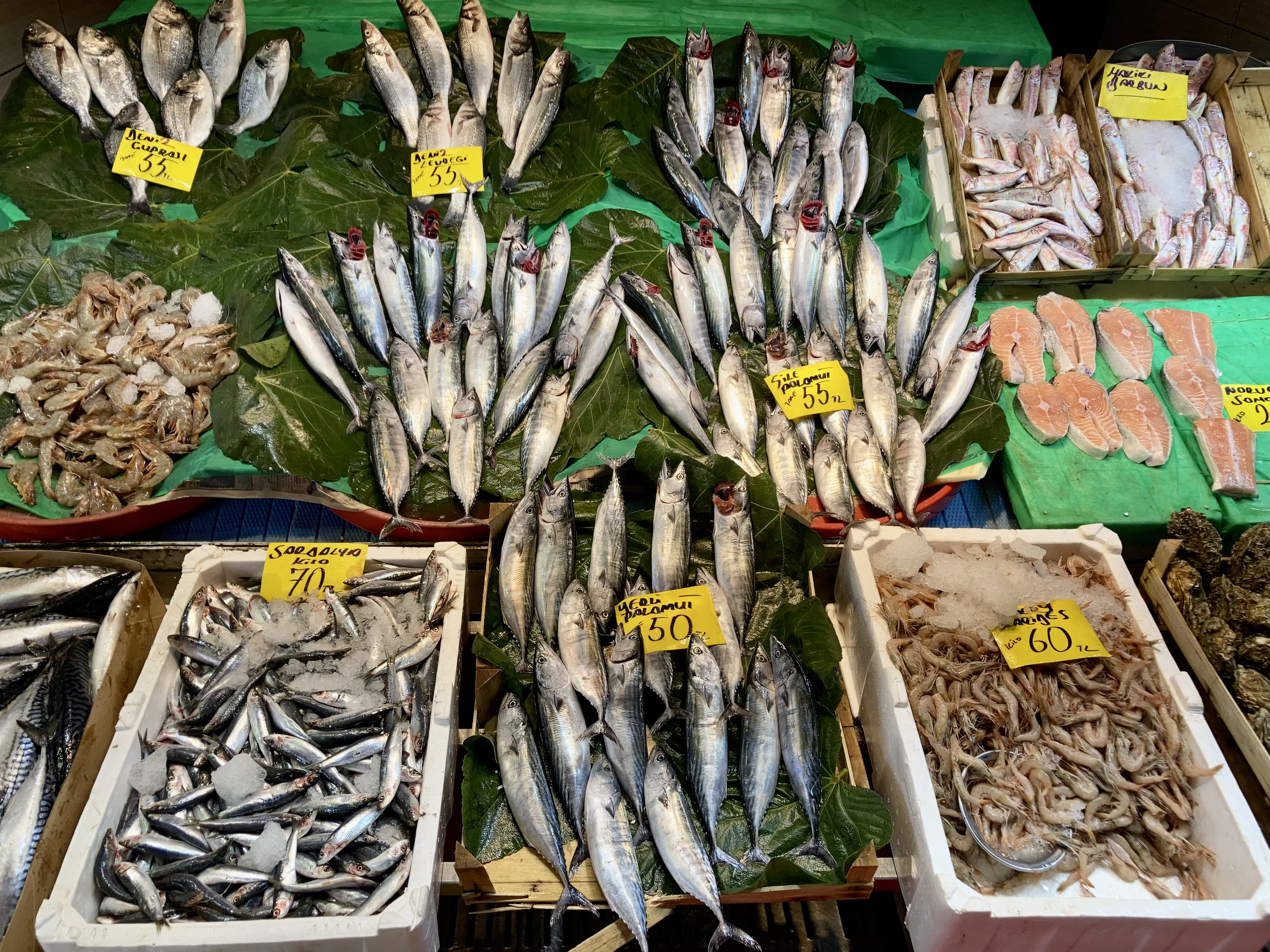
Fish market in Istanbul

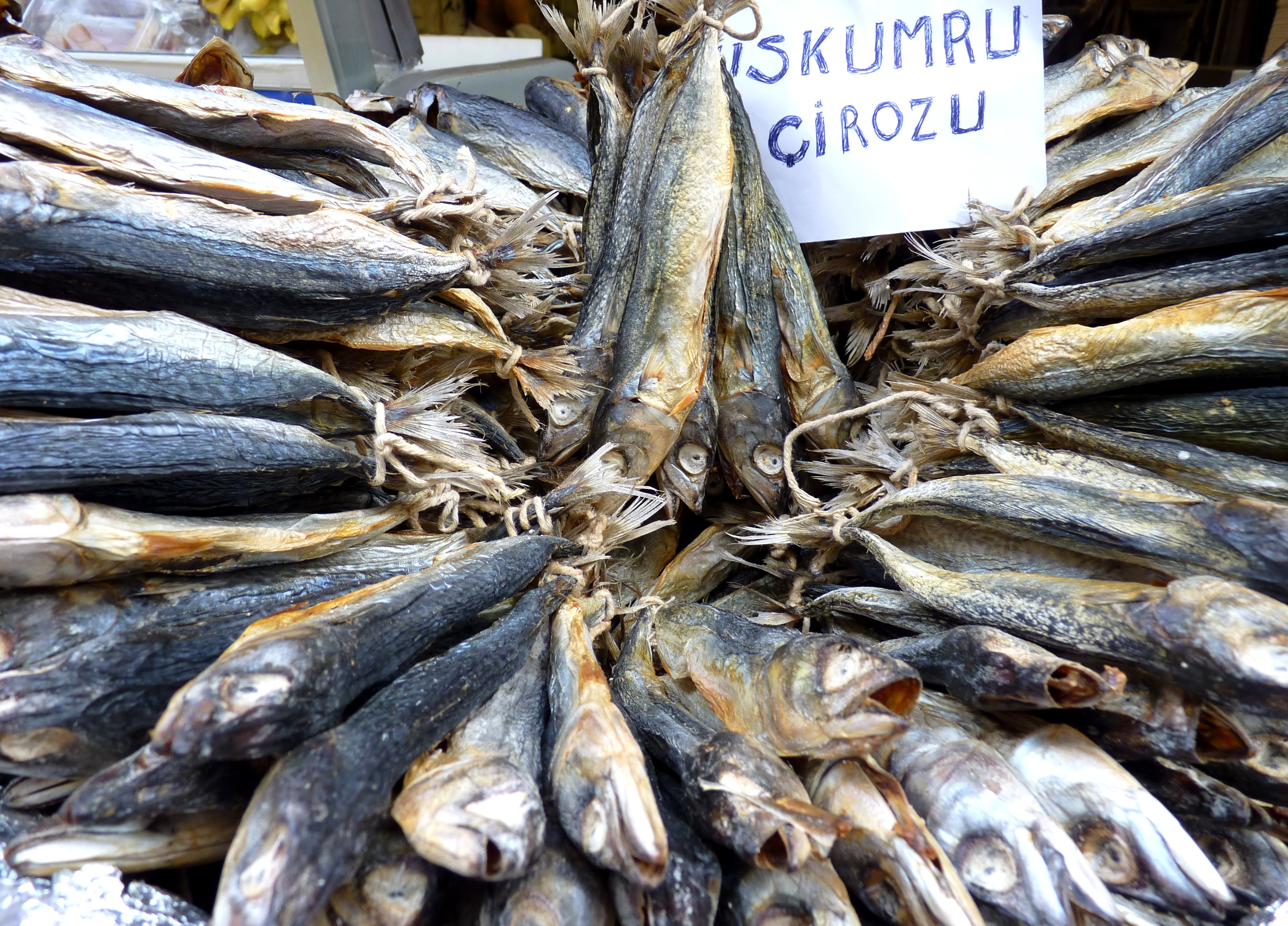
Fish market in Istanbul

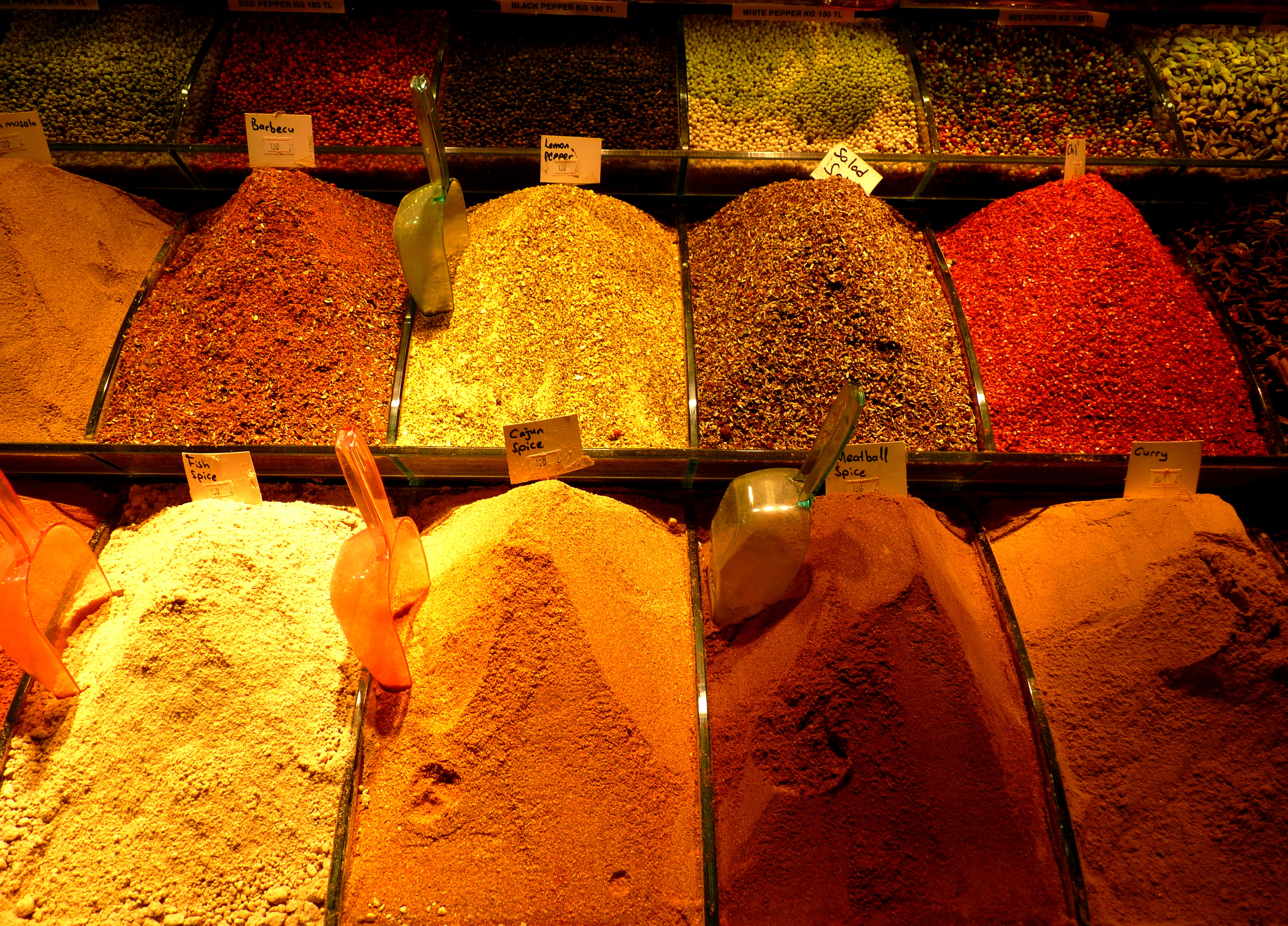
Spices in Istanbul

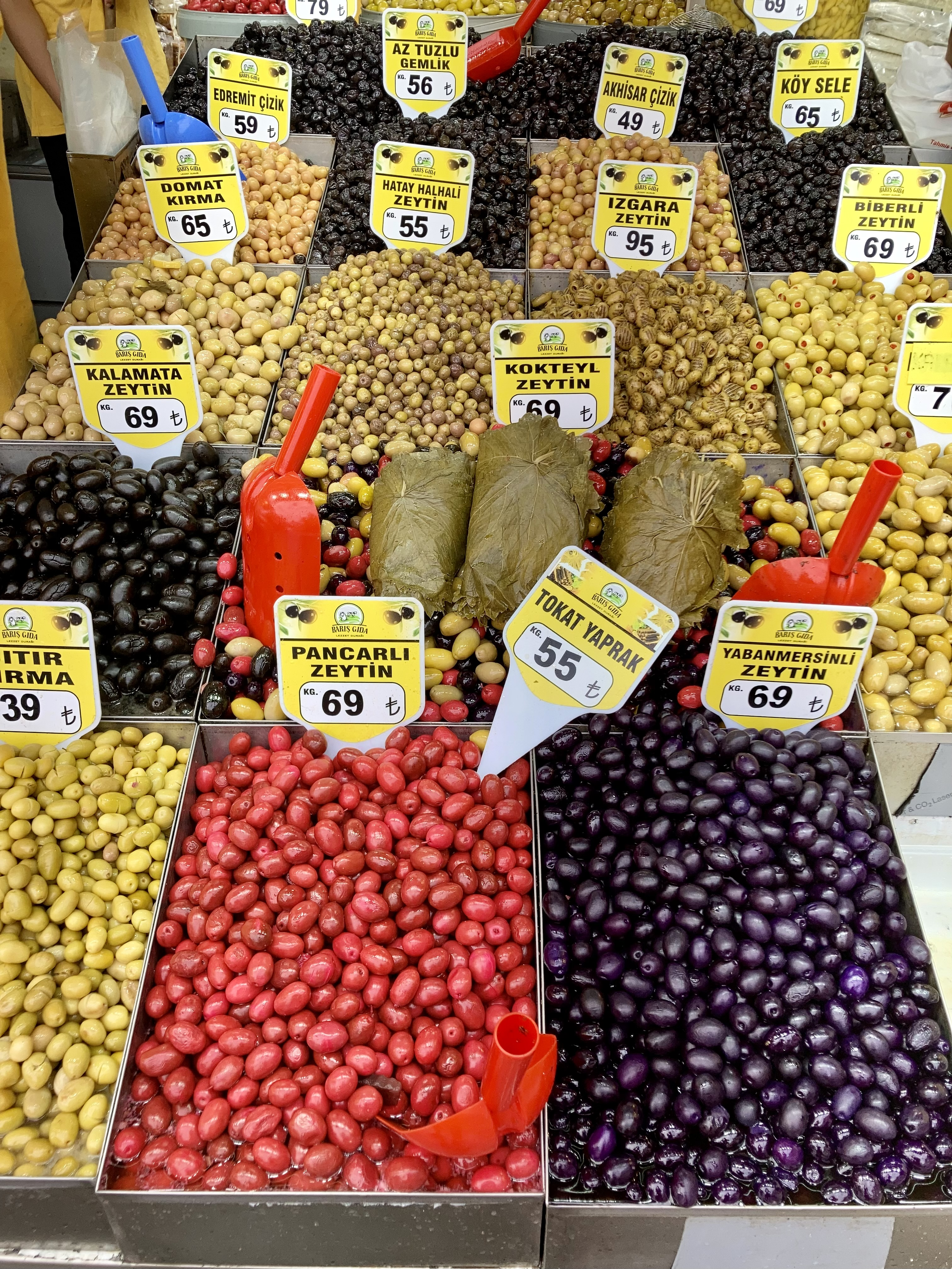
Olives in Spice Bazaar

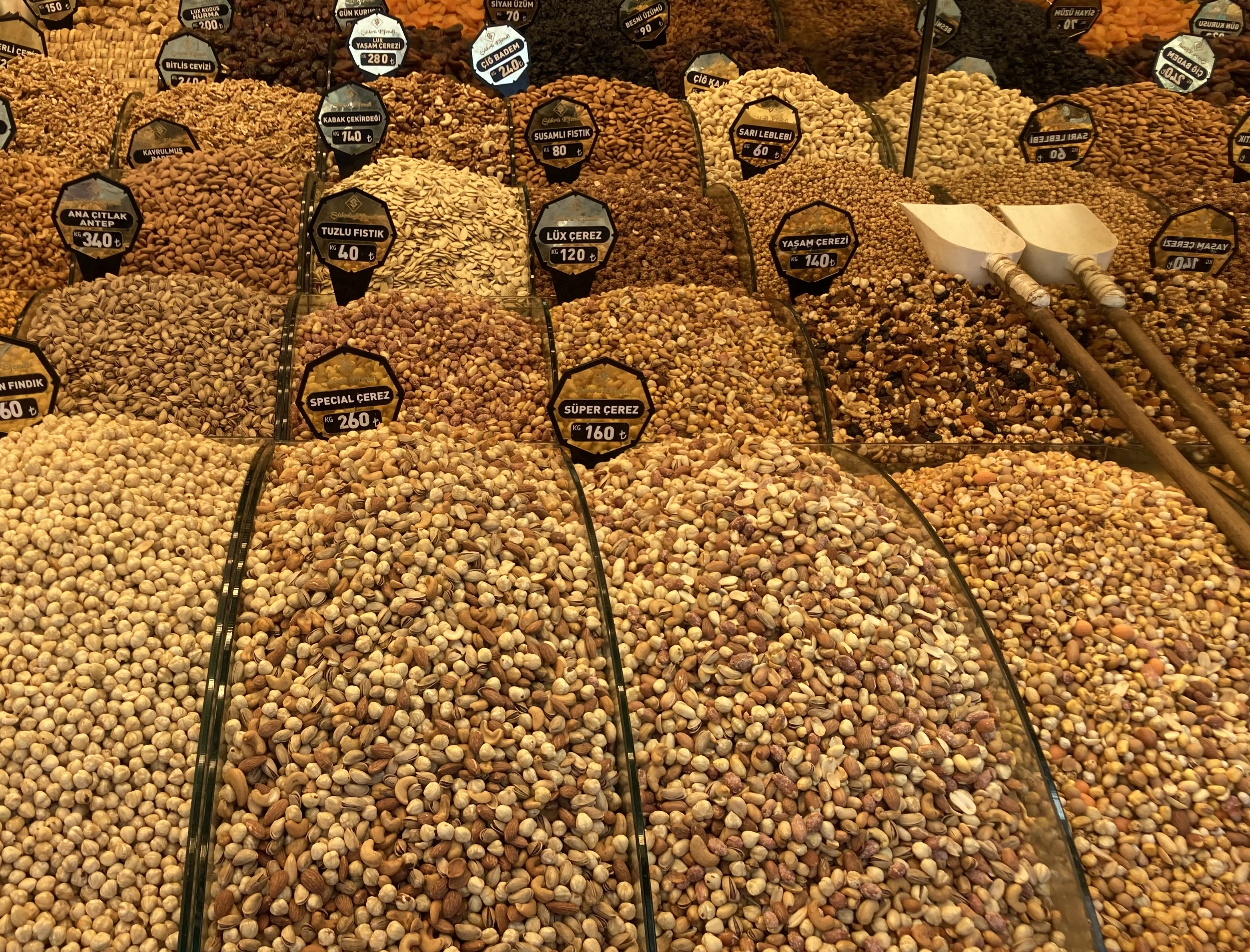
Nuts in Spice Bazaar

==== Central Asia ====
===== Kazakhstan =====
A public market has existed at the site of the Green Bazaar in Almaty since 1875. In addition to selling a wide variety of items, such as meat, produce, and textiles, the marketplace is an important tourist attraction.

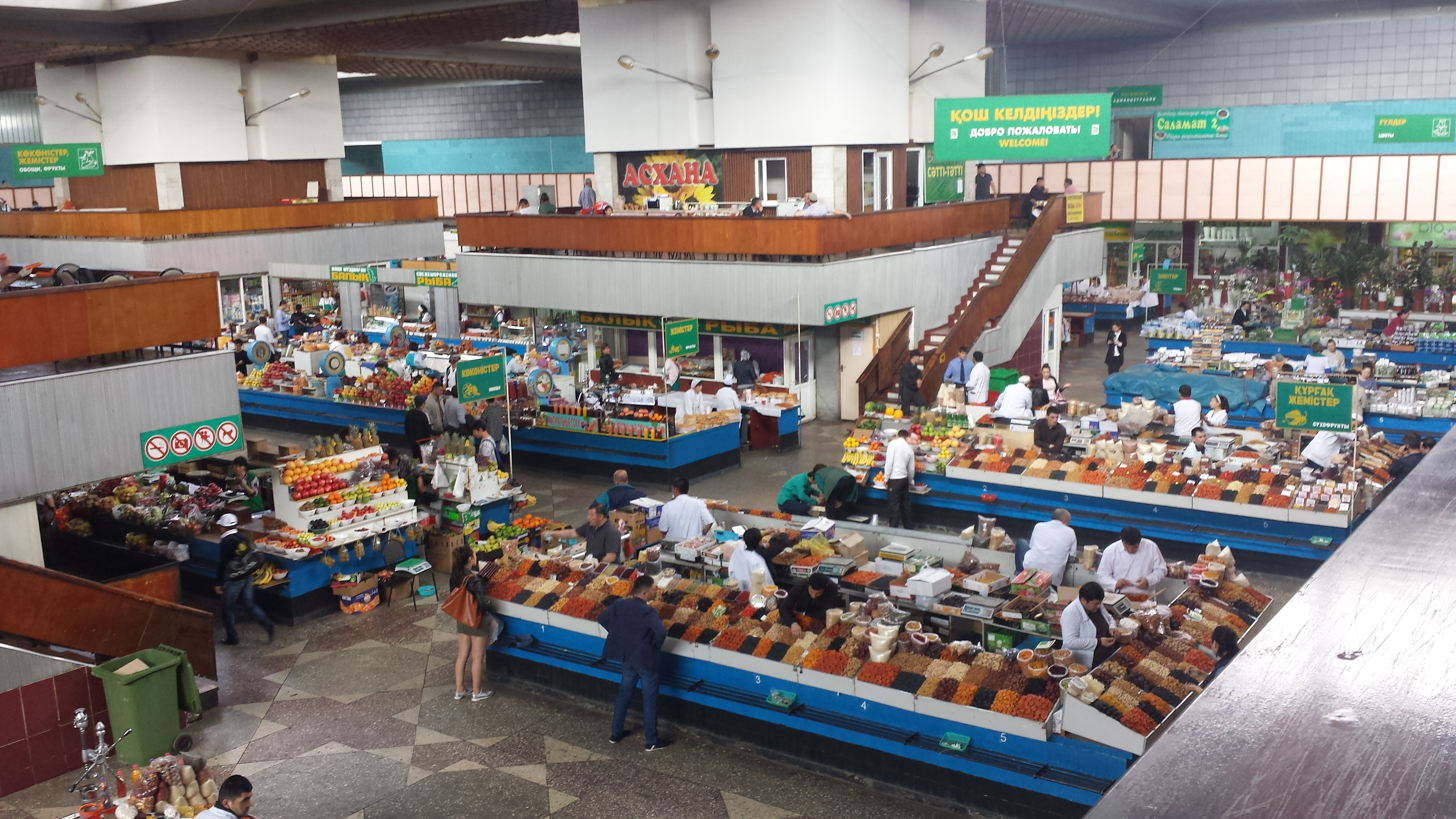
Interior of the Green Bazaar

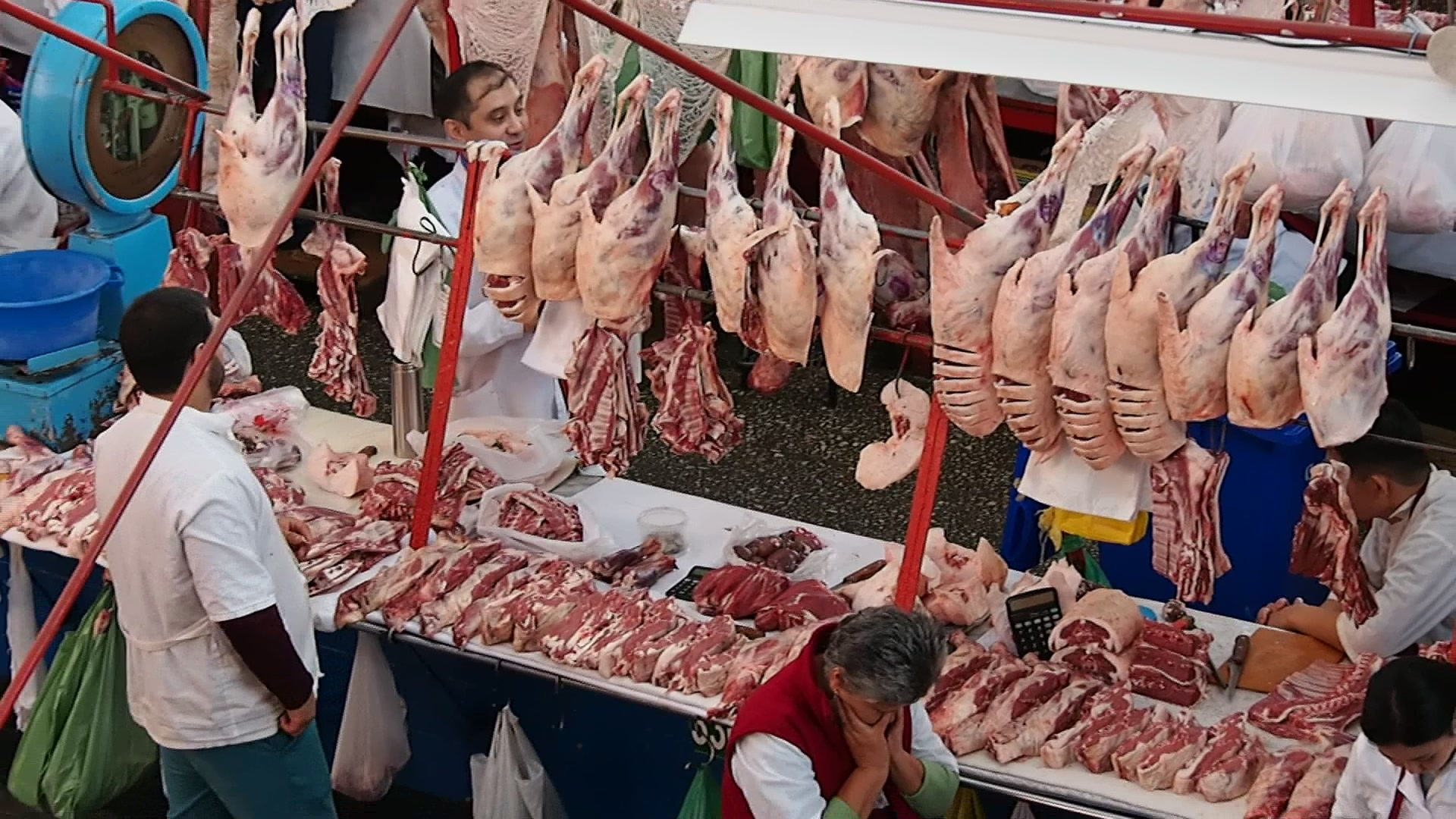
Meat stall

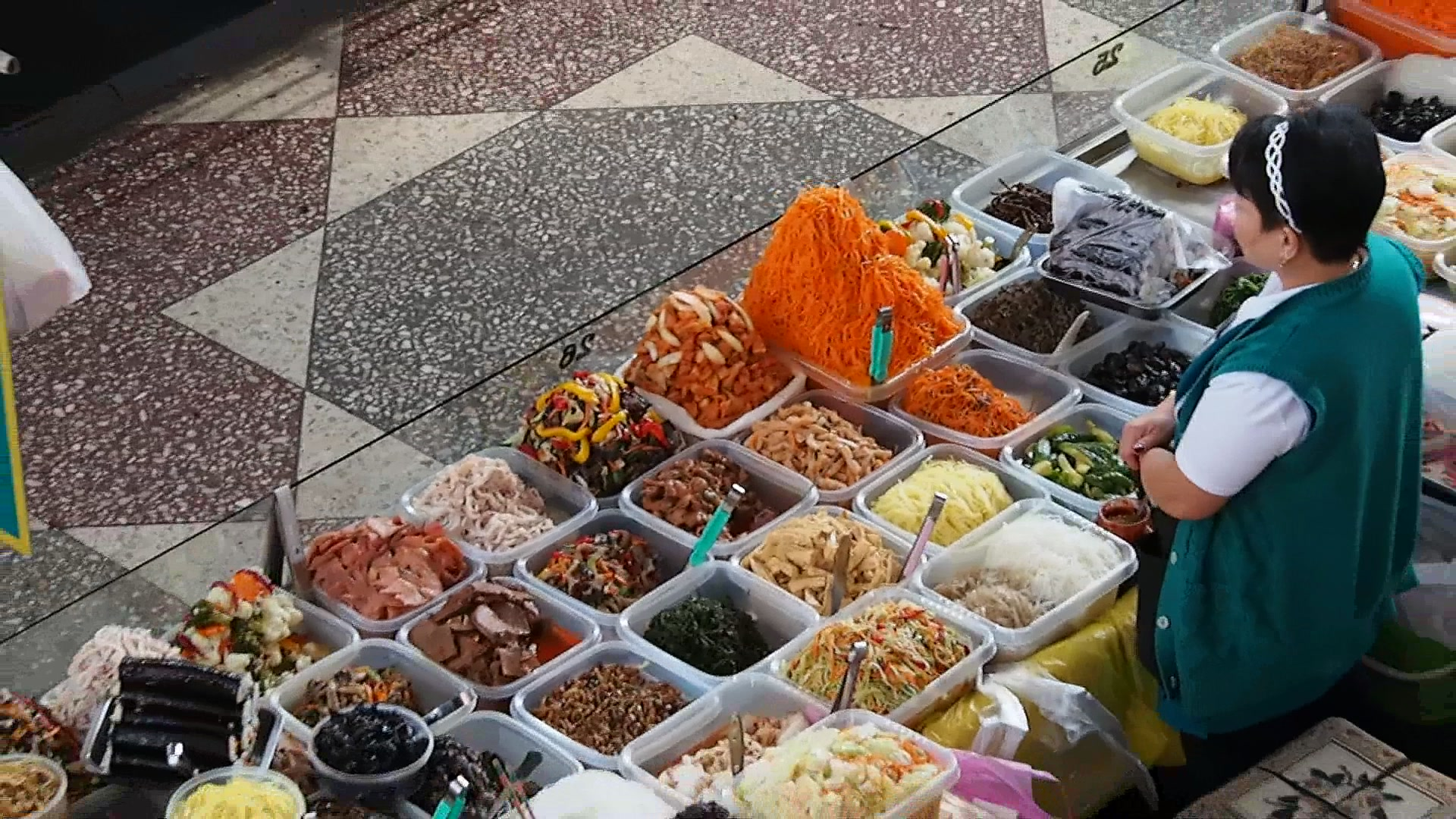
Korean salad stall

=== Europe ===
==== Northern Europe ====
===== Denmark =====
- Torvehallerne Market, Copenhagen – specializing in Nordic foods
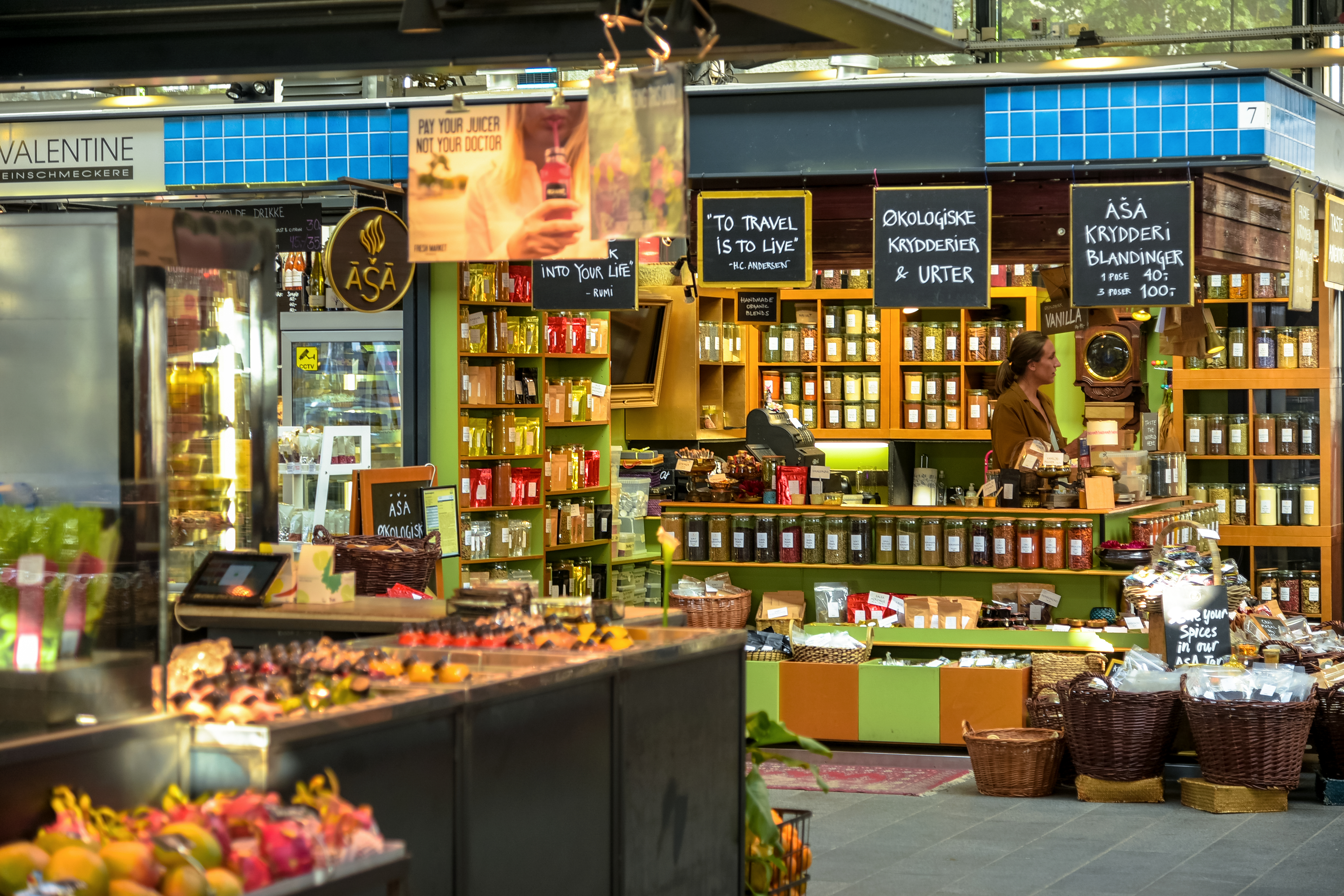
The inside of the Torvehallerne Market

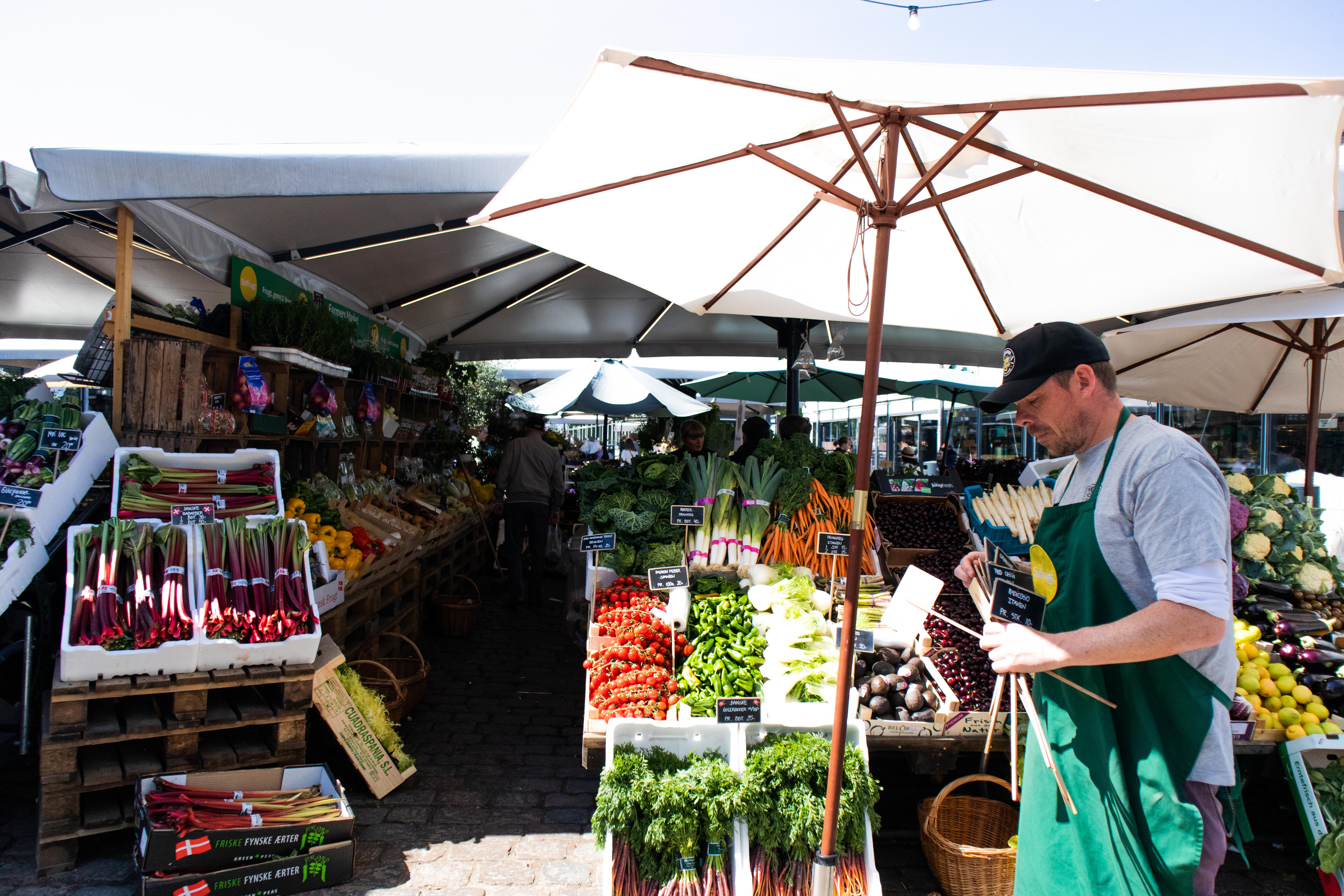
The outside of the Torvehallerne Market

===== Finland =====
- Market Square, Helsinki
- Market Square, Kuopio
- Market Square, Turku
- Tammelantori, Tampere

===== Netherlands =====
- Markthal Market, Rotterdam
- Vismarkt, Groningen
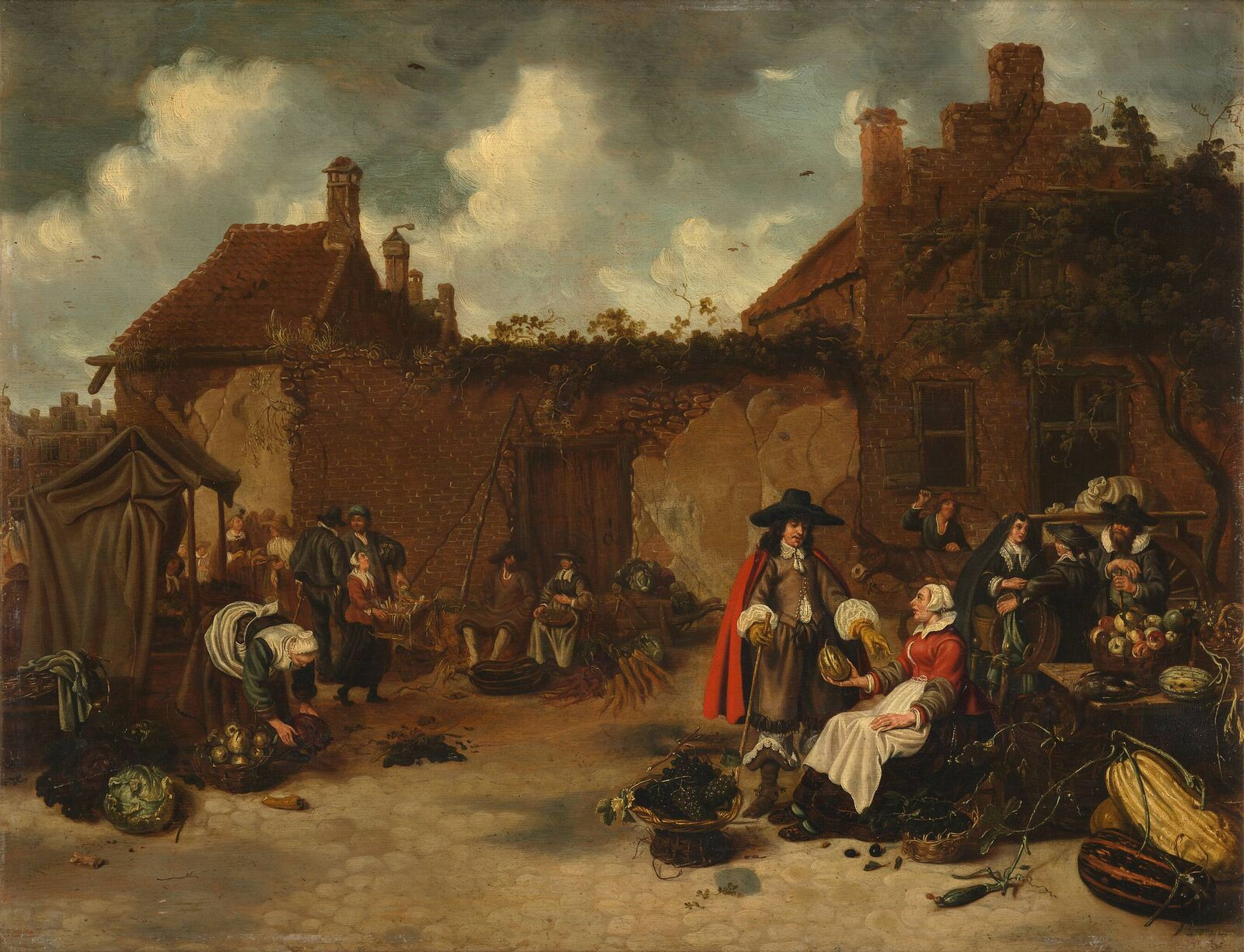
Fruit and vegetable market by Sybrand van Beest, 1652

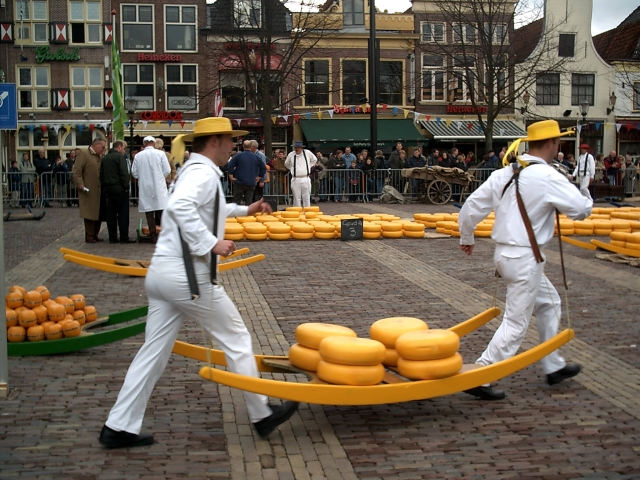
Cheese market in Alkmaar

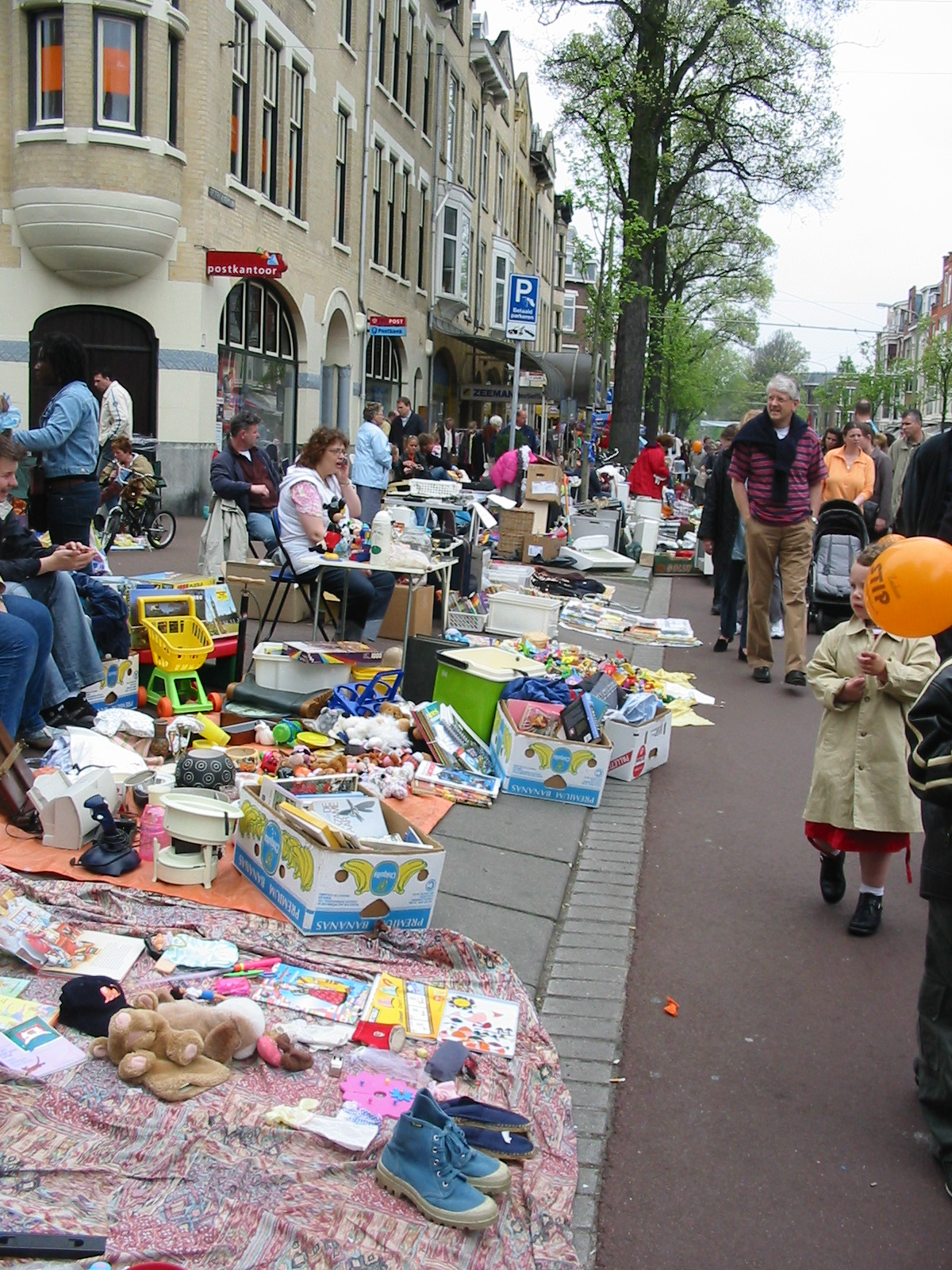
Jumble sale in The Hague

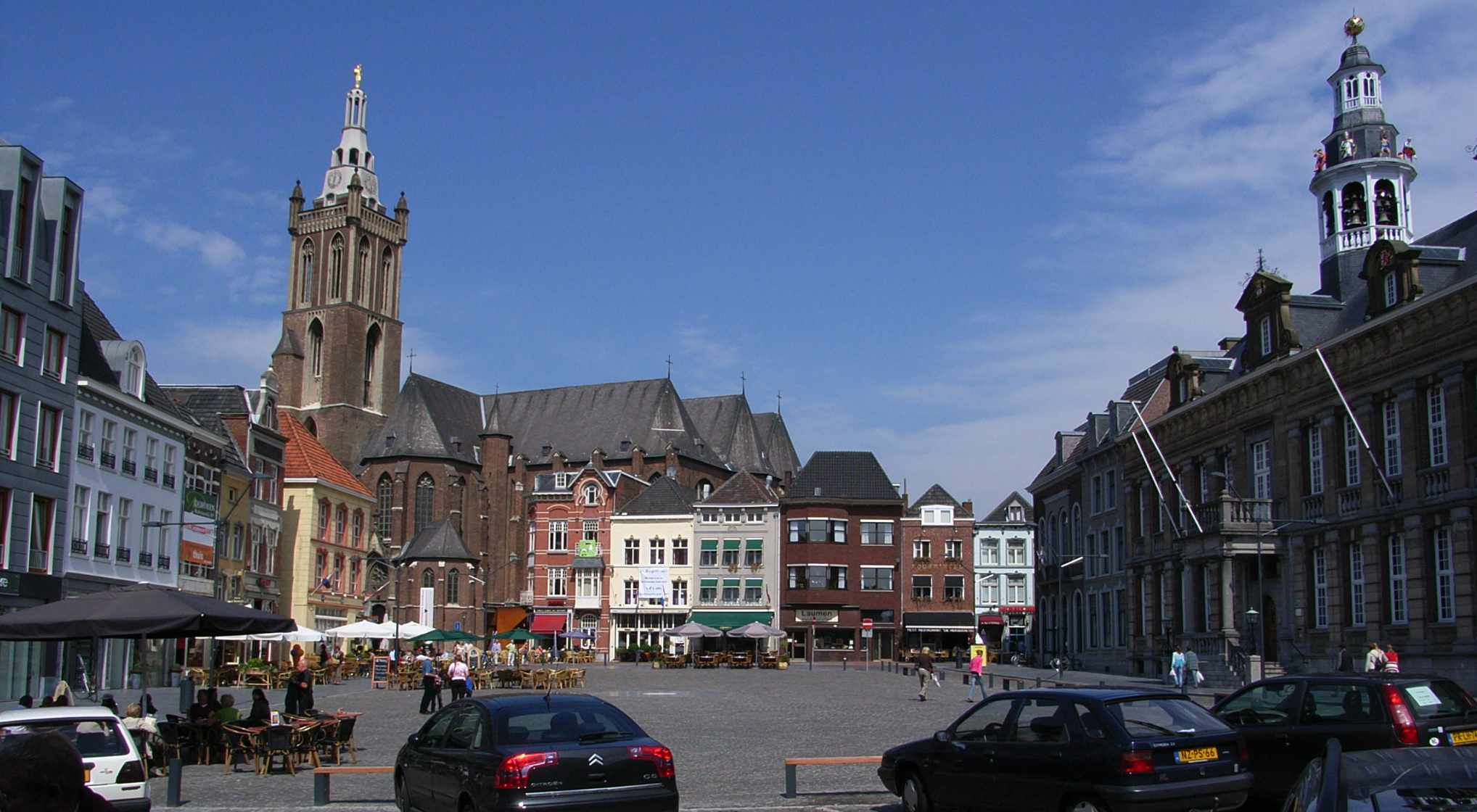
Market in Roermond

===== Latvia =====
- Riga Central Market
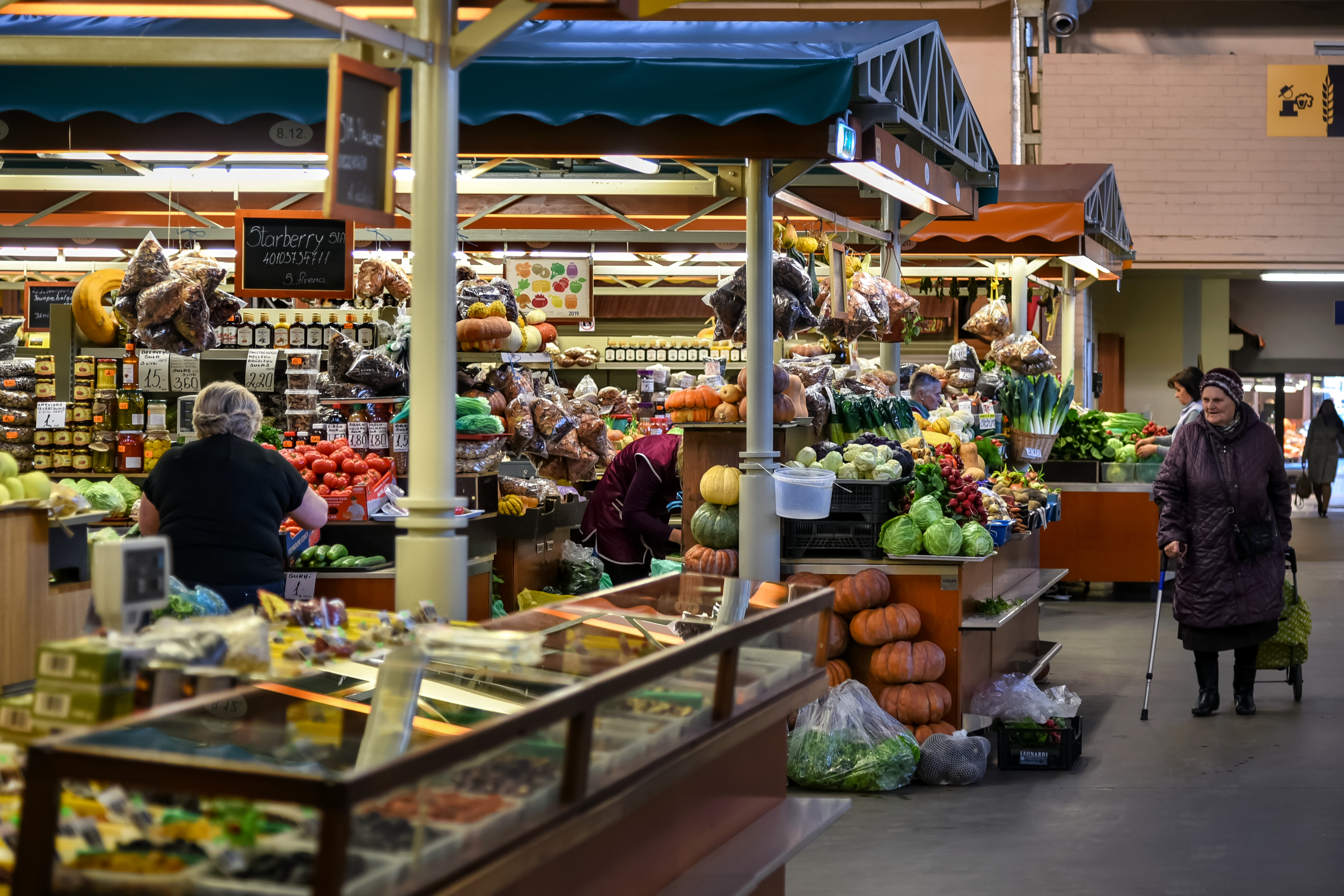
Fruit and vegetable pavilion of Riga Central Market

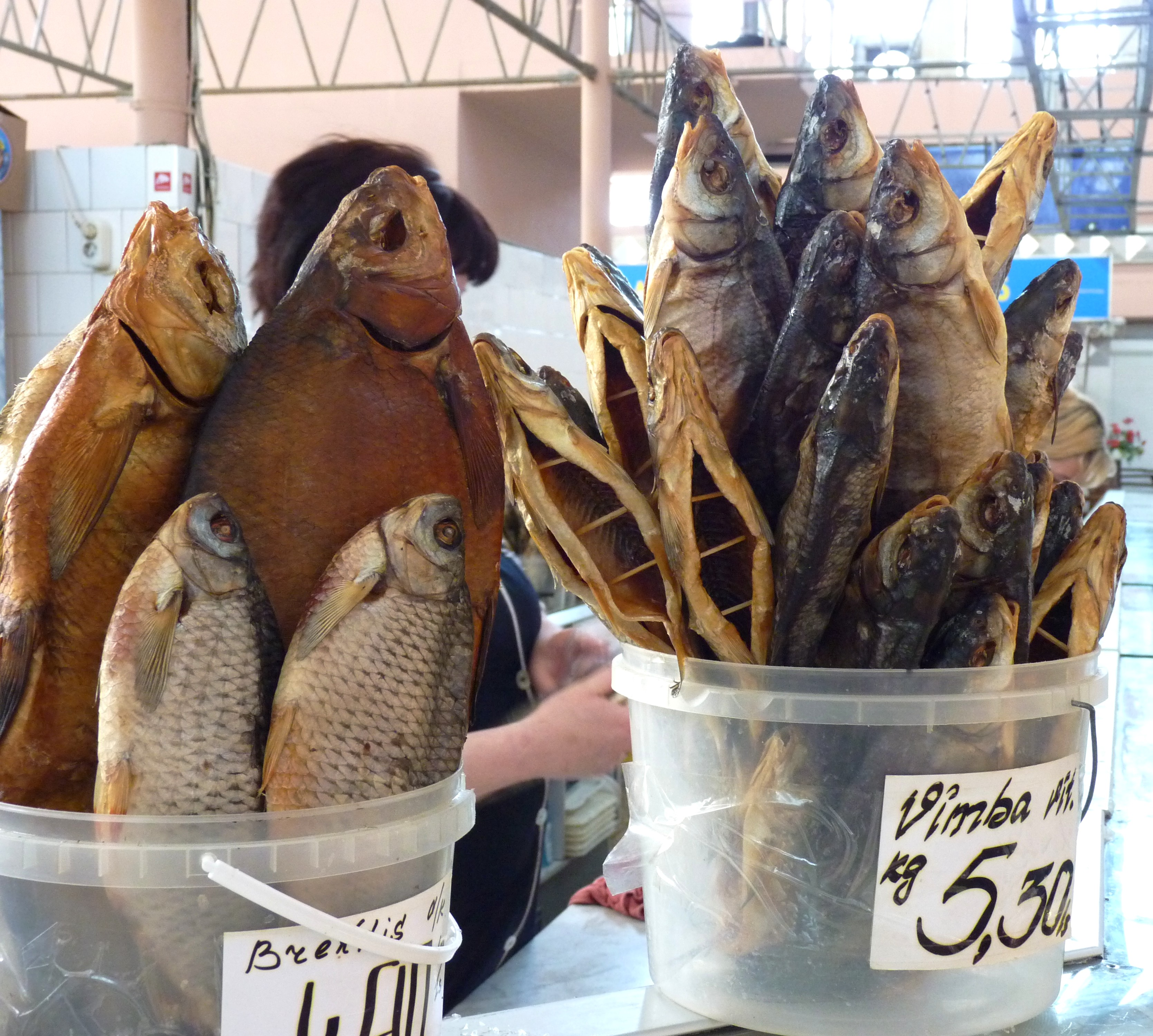
Smoked fish in Riga Central Market

==== Eastern Europe ====
===== Romania =====
- Christmas market
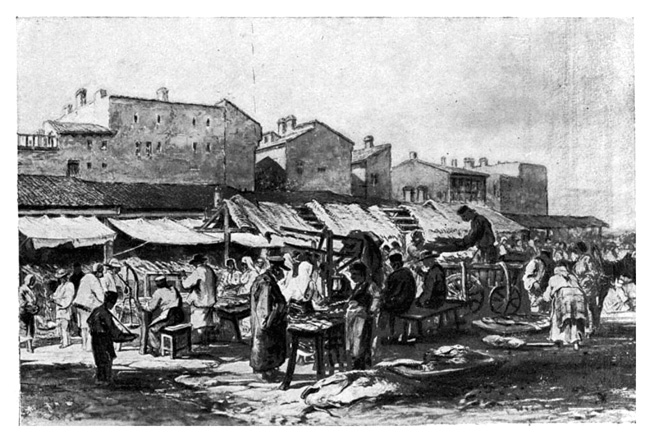
Fish Market at Bucharest by Amadeo Preziosi, 1869

===== Ukraine =====
- Besarabsky Market
- Pryvoz Market
- Seventh-Kilometer Market

==== Central Europe ====
===== Austria =====
- Naschmarkt, Vienna – a 16th-century market

===== Hungary =====
- Central Market Hall, Budapest – built in 1897, the largest market in Budapest
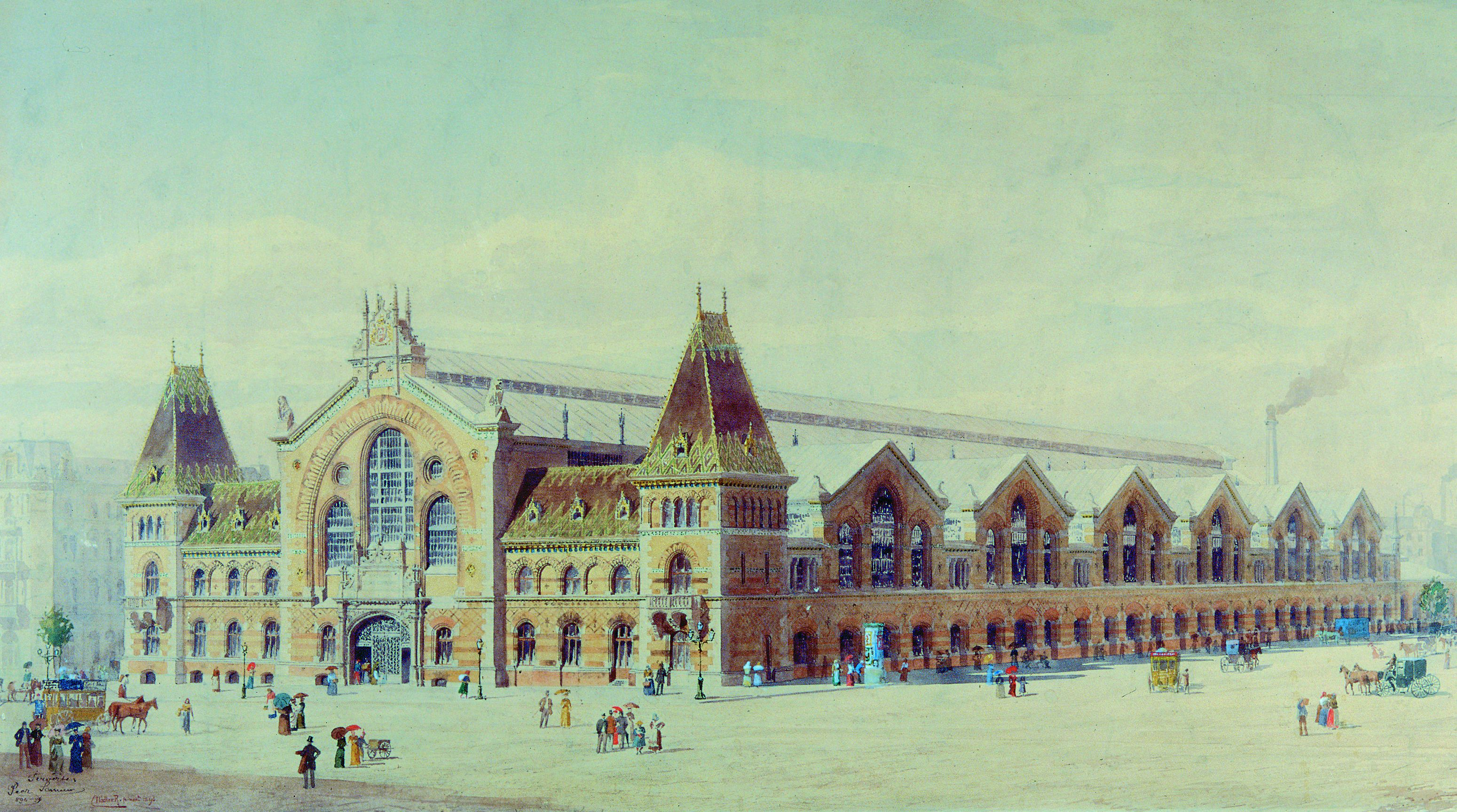
Grand Market Hall in Budapest by Róbert Nádler, 1898

===== Slovakia =====
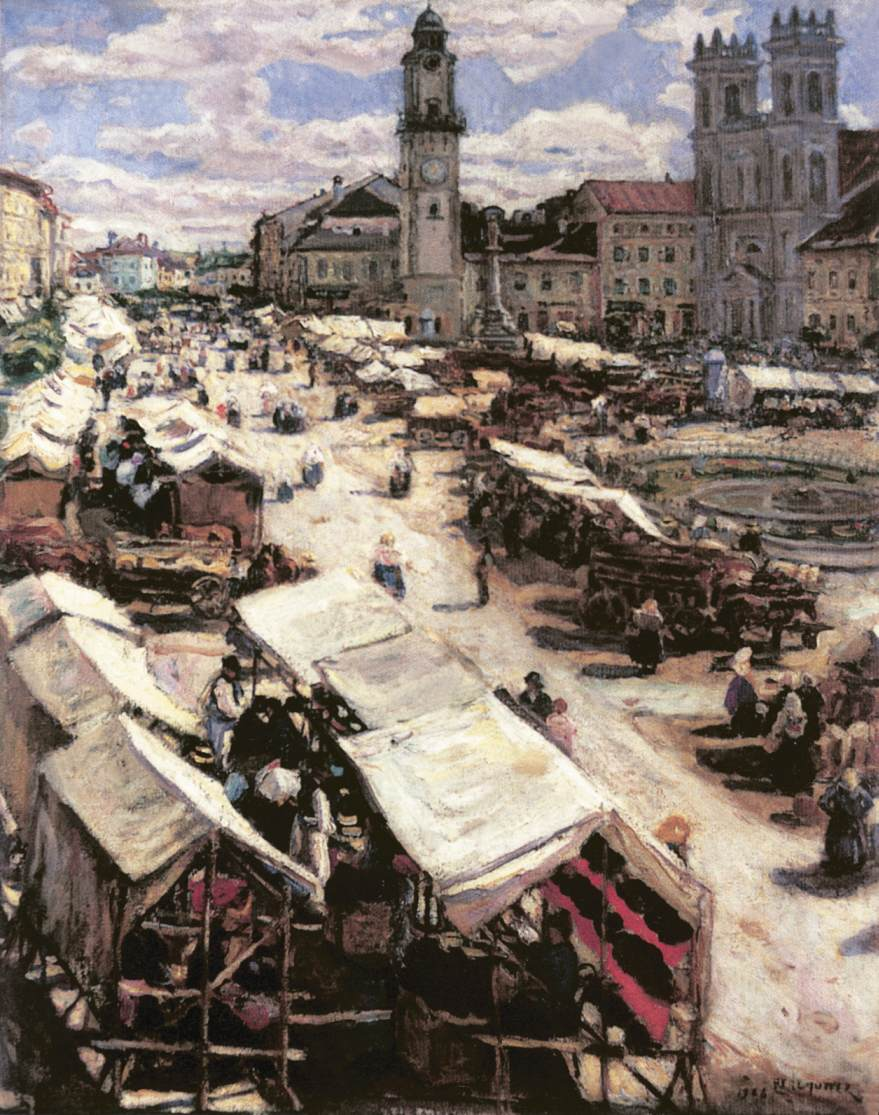
Market at Besztercebánya by Izsák Perlmutter, 1906

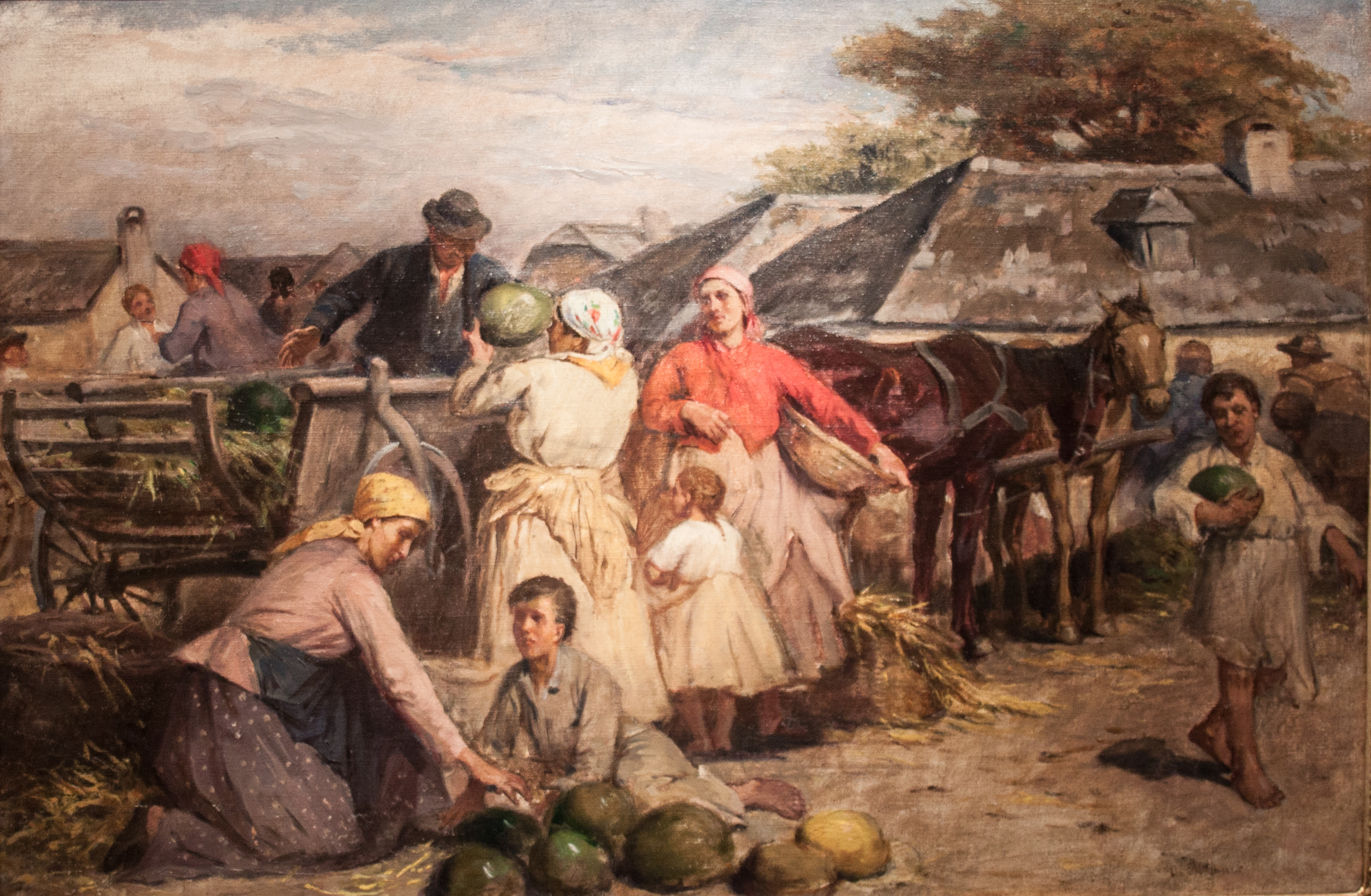
Market of Melons, Lajos, by Deák Ébner, n.d.

==== Western Europe ====
===== Belgium =====
With the rise of global trade in the 16th century, Antwerp became the largest market town in Europe.

- Grote Markt, Antwerp
- Gare du Midi, Brussels – Sunday market

===== France =====
Paris was one of the first European cities to implement a system of formal, centralised and covered market places. Les Halles, a vast centralised wholesale market, was known to be in existence at least by the 13th century when it was expanded, and was demolished in 1971 to make way for an underground shopping precinct. The French system of organised, designated central retail markets was extensively studied by architects in London with a view to emulating the system and ultimately eradicating the informal supply of produce via street vendors.

- Raspail Market, Paris
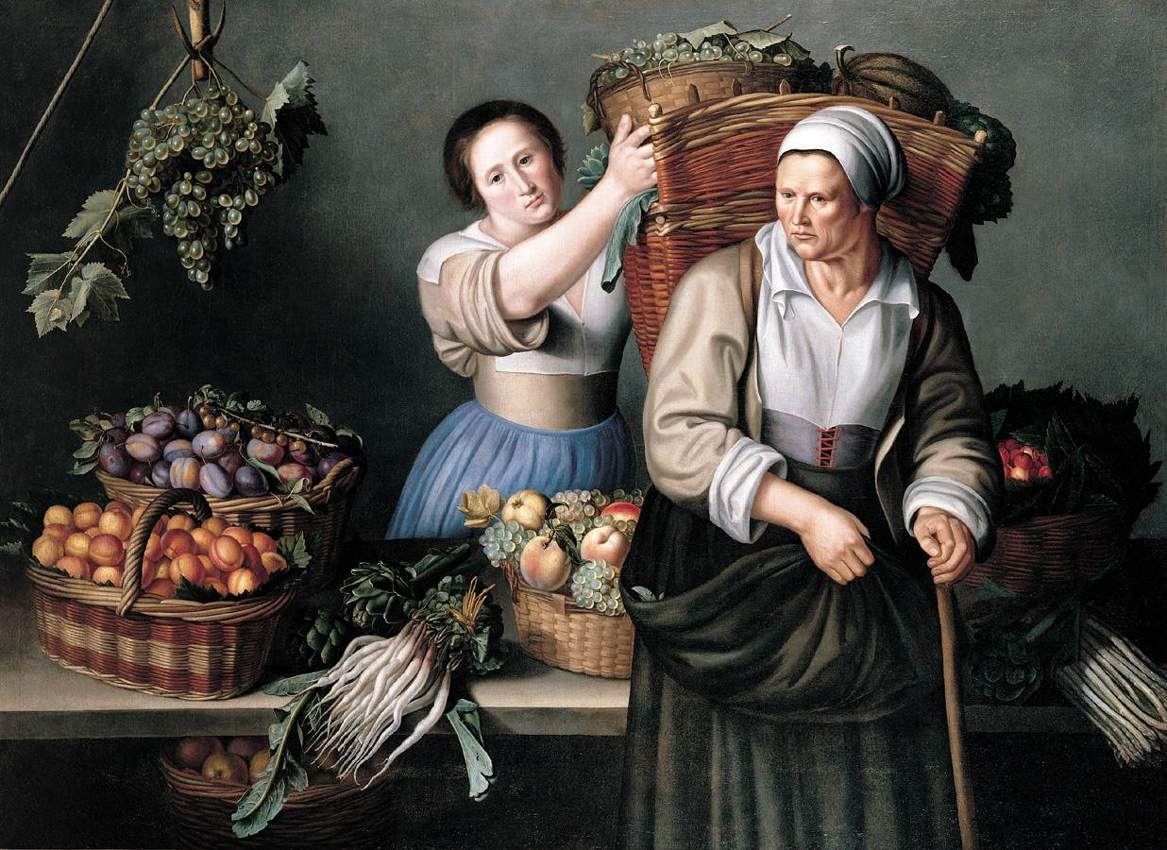
At the market stall, painting by Louise Moillon, 1609

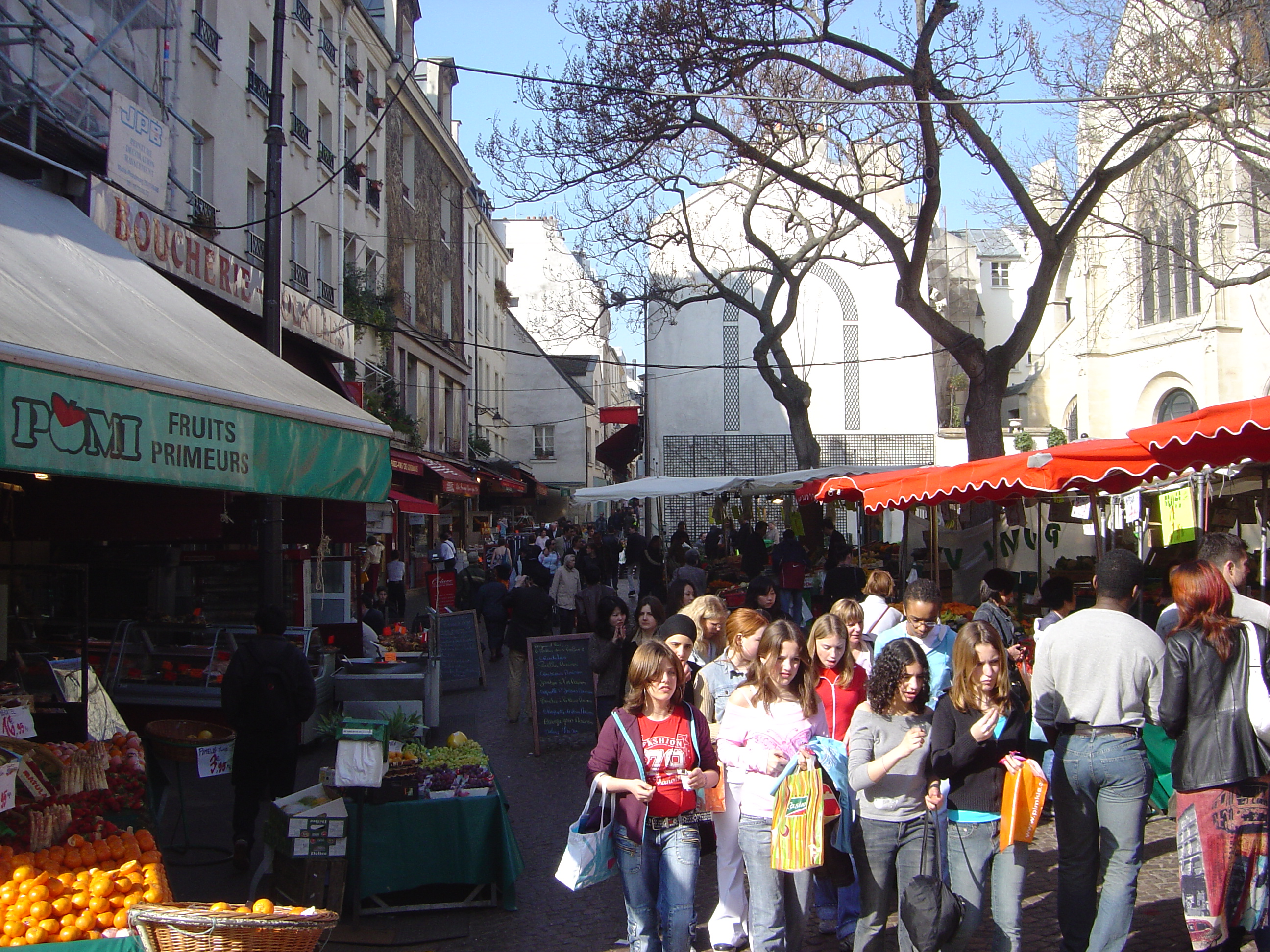
Street market, Rue Mouffetard

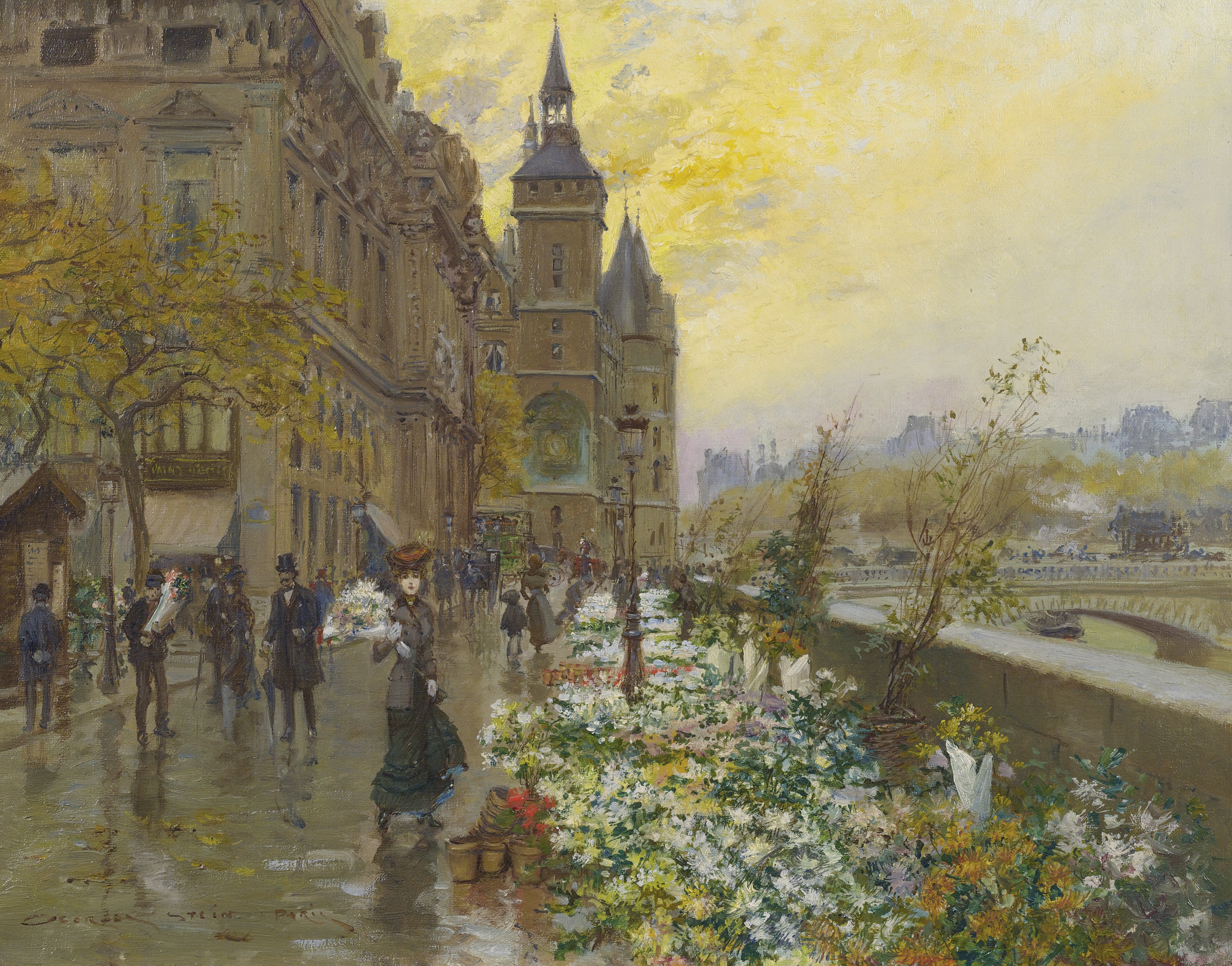
Flower market, Quai de l'Horloge

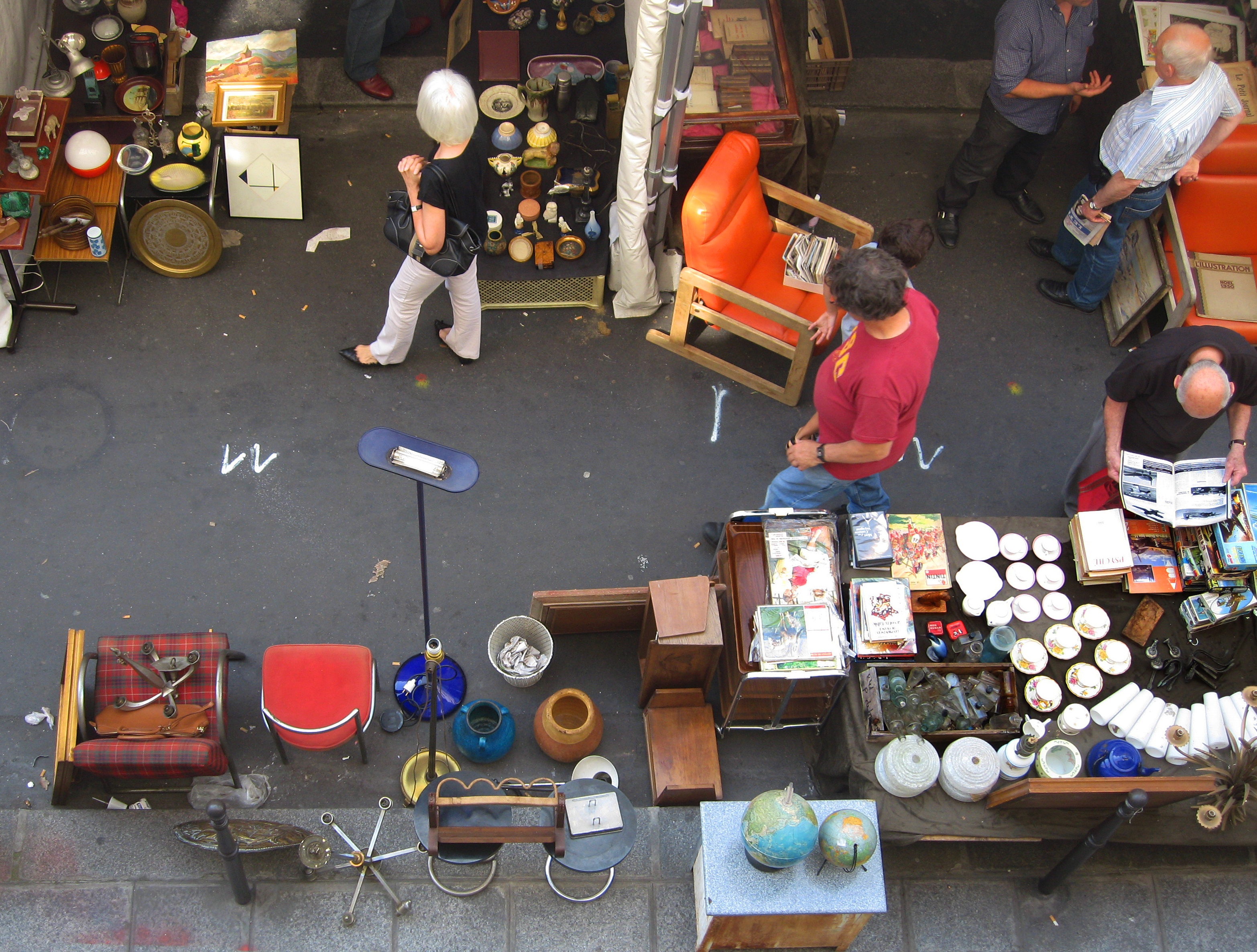
Rue Debelleyme, second-hand market

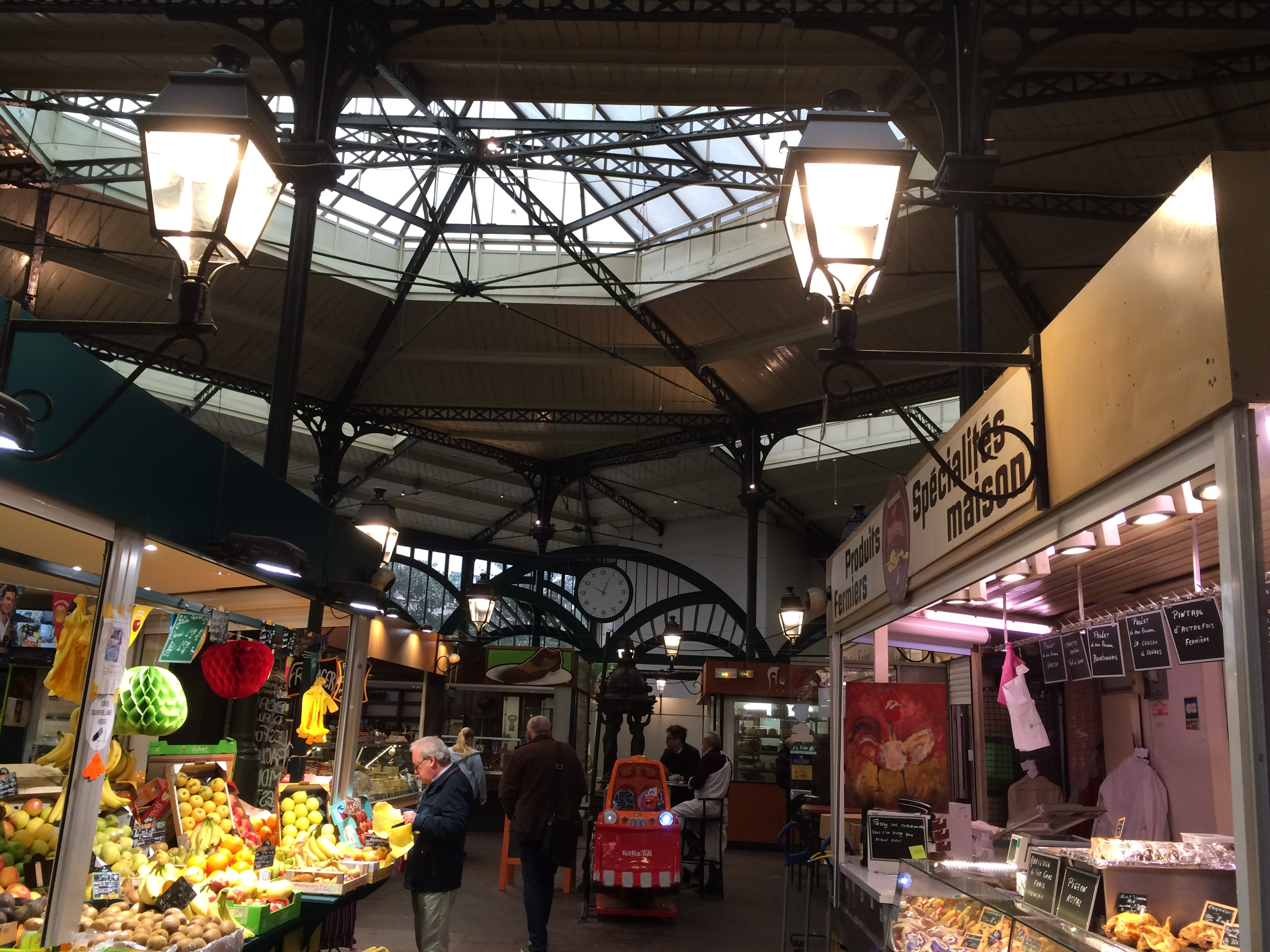
Market Saint-Quentin, 2016

===== Germany =====
- Christkindlesmarkt, Nuremberg, (Christmas market), Germany
- Markthalle IX, Berlin, Germany – built in 1891
- Striezelmarkt Dresden, Germany
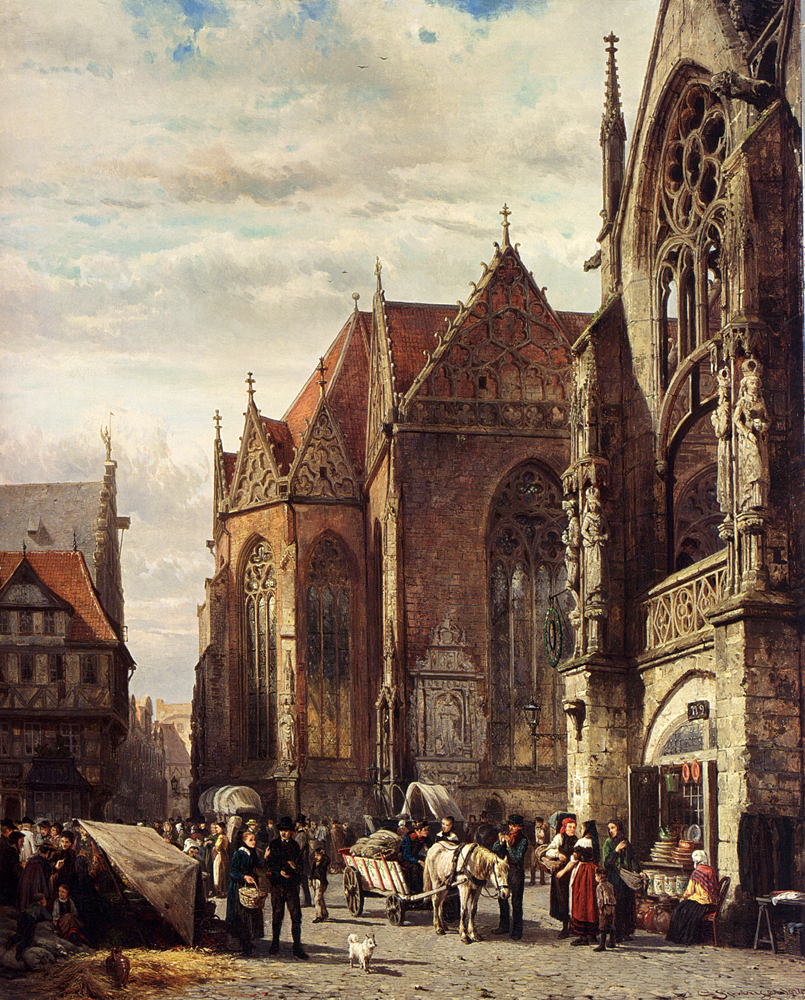
Figures on the Market Square in Front of the Martinikirche Braunschweig, by Cornelis Springer, 1874

===== United Kingdom =====
====== Background and licensing ======
The majority of retail markets are operated by the public sector and administered by local governments. A small number are operated by private groups or individuals. Traders can be licensed to trade on a single pitch but not at a national level or when trading on private land. This piecemeal licensing system has contributed to declining public confidence in the reputation of markets. A voluntary scheme has been set up by The Market People, backed by the National Association of British Market Authorities (NABMA) to address this problem. It provides consumers with traceability of traders and goods as well as the ability to rate and contact the traders. A MarketPASS is issued to an operator or trader, once they have provided proof of identity, insurance and, where required, a hygiene certificate.

A study conducted by the Retail Alliance noted that Britain had 1,124 traditional retail markets, 605 farmers' markets, 26 wholesale markets and more than 45,700 retail traders and that retail markets had an annual turnover of over £3.5 billion while wholesale markets had turnover of £4.1 billion annually. The data also shows that traditional outdoor street markets continue to dominate the market space, but are in decline. Markets also have significant appeal for tourists and visitors.

Some researchers make a distinction between traditional markets and gentrified markets. Traditional markets which are primarily held outdoors on specific days, focus on high volume produce sold with low margins. In the gentrified market, the focus is on specialty produce, notably organic foods, hyper-local produce, artisanal products, vintage clothing, or designer brands. Whereas traditional markets are in decline, gentrified markets represent a major growth opportunity.

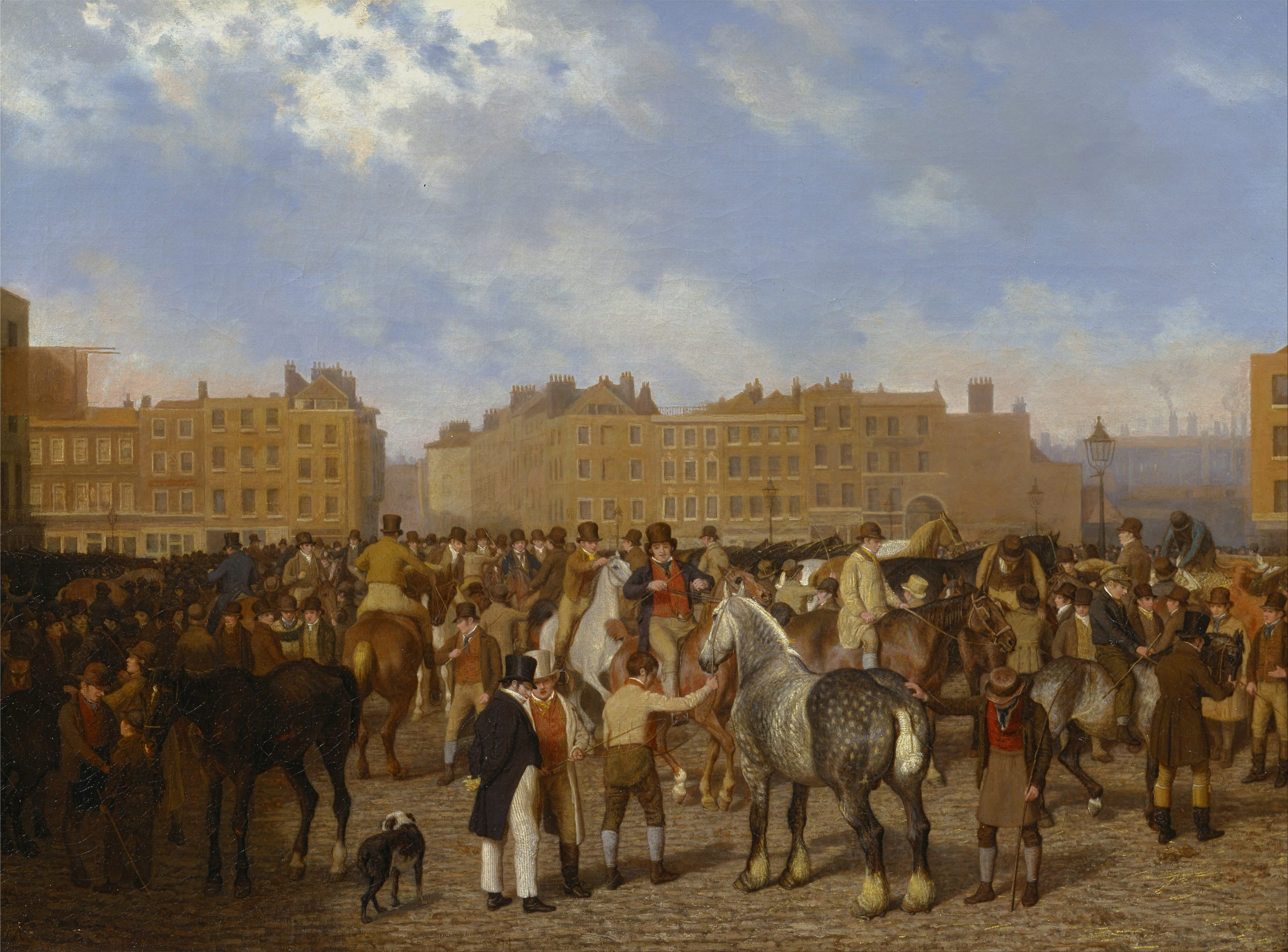
Old Smithfield Market painting by Jacques-Laurent Agasse, 1824

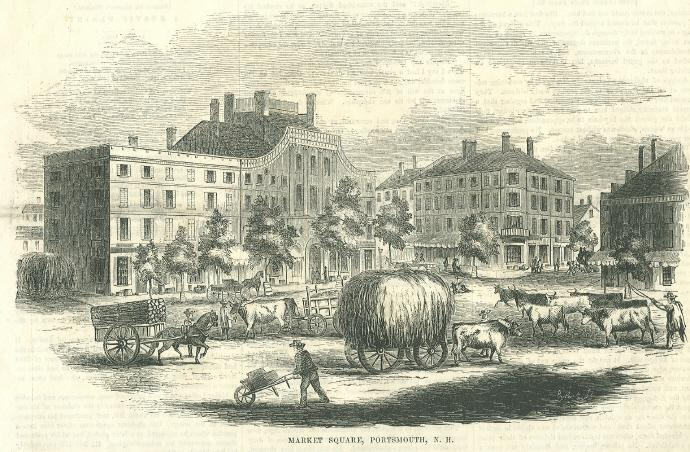
Market Square in Portsmouth, 1853

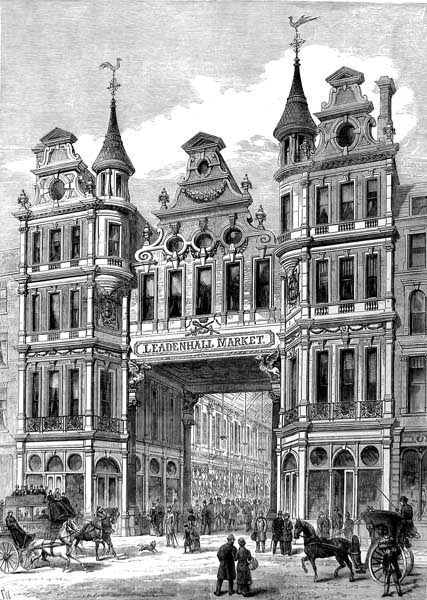
London's Leadenhall market (exterior), 1881

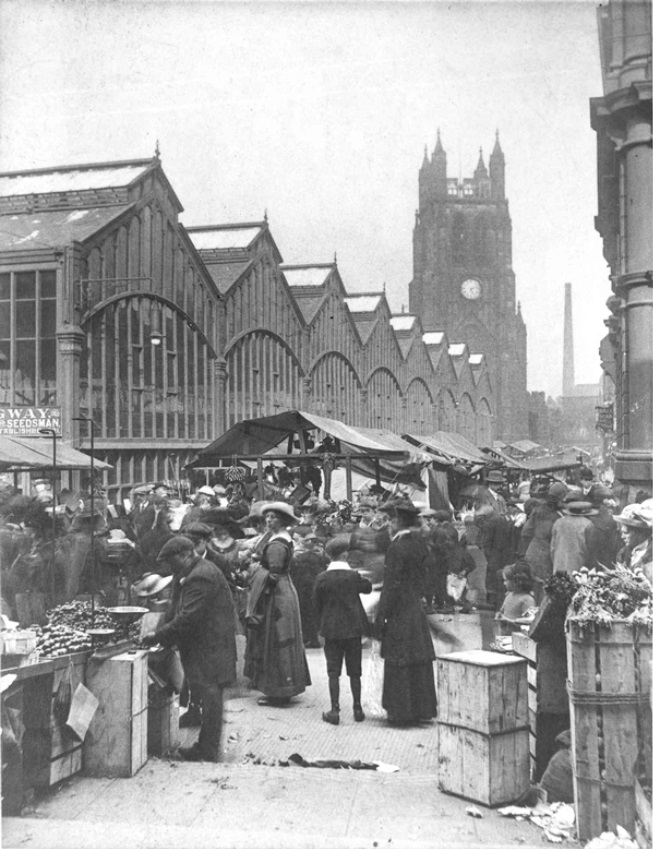
Market Day in Stockport, 1910s

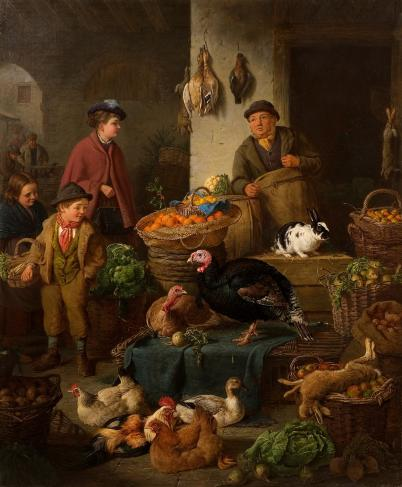
The Market Stall by Henry Charles Bryant, early 20th century

====== England's chartered markets and fairs ======
From the 11th century, the English monarchs awarded a charter to local lords to create markets and fairs for a town or village. A charter granted the lords the right to take tolls from vendors and also afforded some protection to a town from rival markets. Once a chartered market was granted for specific market days, a nearby rival market could not open on the same days. Across the boroughs of England, a network of chartered markets sprang up between the 12th and 16th centuries, giving consumers reasonable choice in the markets they preferred to patronise. Gradually these market towns developed a reputation for quality or for trade in specific types of goods. Today, traders and showmen jealously guard these historic charters.

===== County markets =====
- Covered Market, Oxford, Oxfordshire
- Covered Market, Preston
- Leeds Kirkgate Market, Yorkshire
- Old Market, Bristol
- The Old Market, Hove
- Market Harborough, Leicestershire
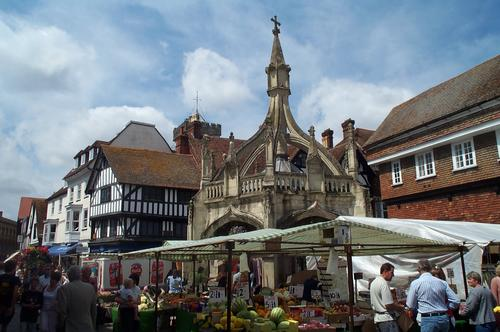
Salisbury chartered market

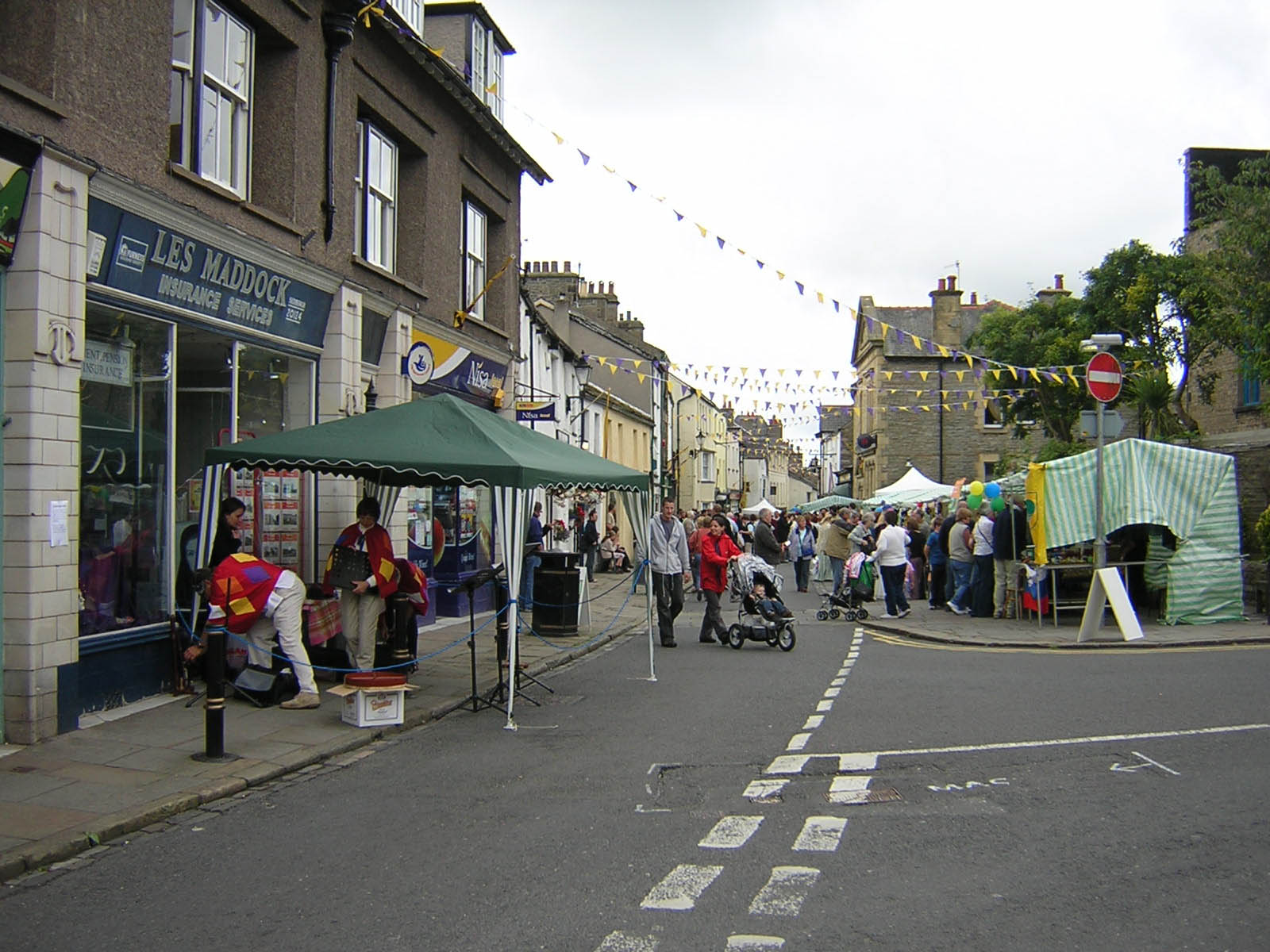
Sedbergh chartered market

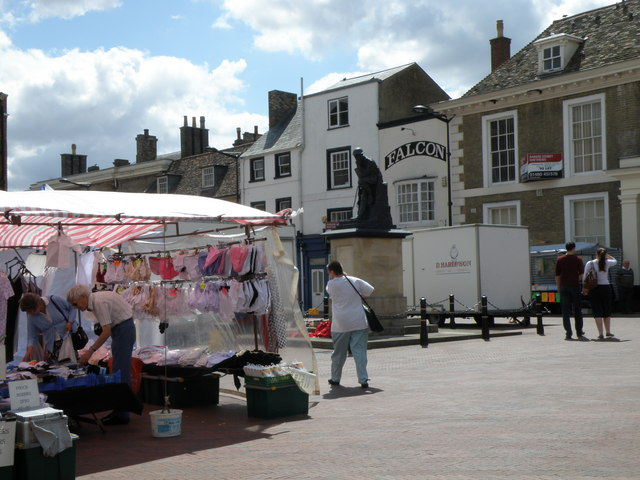
Market Square, Huntingdon

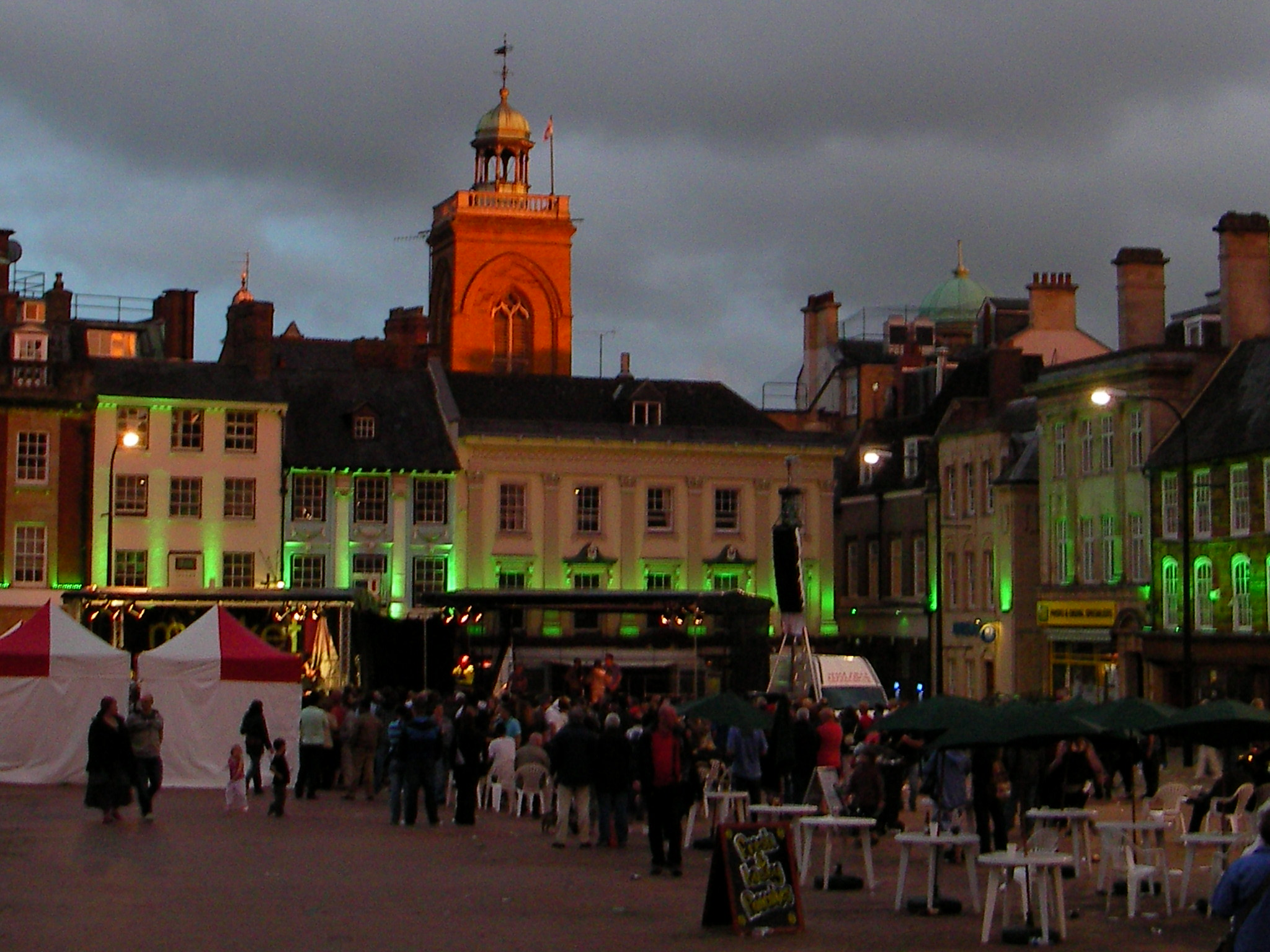
Northampton Market is thought to be England's oldest continuously operating chartered market

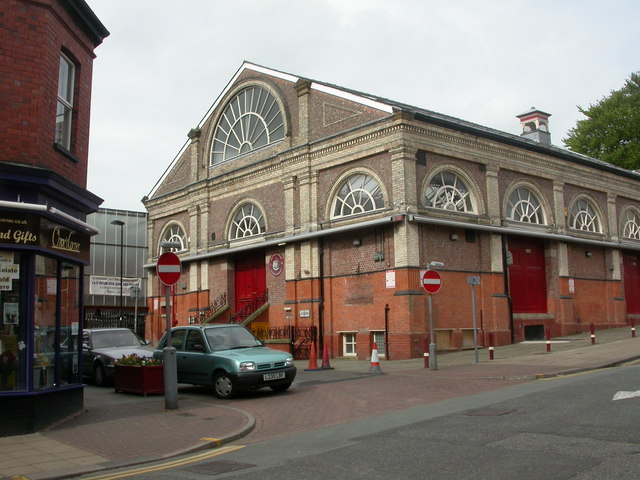
Altrincham, Chartered Market

====== London ======
Between the 13th century and the Great Fire of 1666, London's main market was the Stocks Market, "on the site of the fixed pillory where traders were punished who fell foul of the Assize Courts". The Stocks Market was removed in 1737 as part of Christopher Wren's plans to rebuild the city. New wholesale markets were erected in strategic locations and these prospered until well into the 19th century with some continuing until modern times. The wholesale markets were highly controlled, closed environments that were minutely regulated and meticulously planned. These included Smithfield Meat Market (built in 1866), Billingsgate Fish Market (constructed in 1875) and Leadenhall Market (completed in 1881). The retail trade was largely serviced by itinerant street sellers or costermongers. In central London, costermongers worked along designated routes, selling door-to-door or by trading from some 36 unauthorised, but highly organised markets situated along major thoroughfares or meeting places such as Whitecross Street, Covent Garden and Leather Lane. In an attempt to regulate street trading, a number of authorised retail markets were built during the 19th century with limited success. Examples of retail markets constructed during this period include: St James, St George's (Southwark), Carnaby, Hungerford, Randall's (Poplar, London), Fitzroy, Finsbury, and the People's Market (Whitechapel), Angela Burdett-Coutts' Market and Columbia Road Market (now a flower market). Retail markets were less successful than their wholesale counterparts and the number of retail markets declined from 24 in 1800 to 17 in 1840. In reality, London's working classes generally preferred the convenience of street trading which continued to thrive until the 20th century.

Charles Knight devoted an entire section to markets in his pictorial essay, Pictorial Half-hours of London Topography, (1851) in which he identifies the main wholesale markets as the Corn Market; the Coal Exchange; Billingsgate – the main fish market; Smithfield – a cattle market since at least 1150. Retail meat markets include Newgate; Whitechapel; Newgate; Newport, Oxford; St George's, and Shepherd's Market in Mayfair. Produce markets included Covent Garden, which Knight considered to be the 'pre-eminent' vegetable market; Farringdon Market between Holborn Hill and Fleet Street; Spitalfields, the largest potato market in London; Portman Market; Hungerford Market; and Leadenhall Market, a mixed produce and meat market. In addition, the Skin Market at Bermondsey dealt in leather and hay markets were held at Whitechapel, Cumberland Market, Regent's Park, and Smithfield.

Some examples of street markets operating today include Berwick Street Market, Broadway Market, Camden Market, East Street Market, Petticoat Lane, and Portobello Road Market. The most popular for food is Borough Market which sell most fresh produce as well as having a bakery.

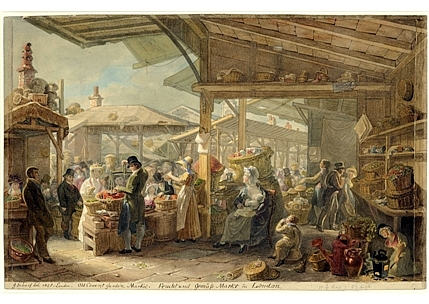
Covent Garden market, illustration by George Johann Scharf circa 1820

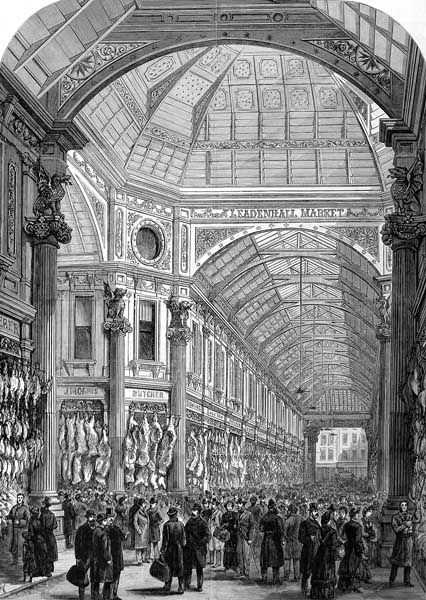
Leadenhall Market from the Illustrated London News, 1881

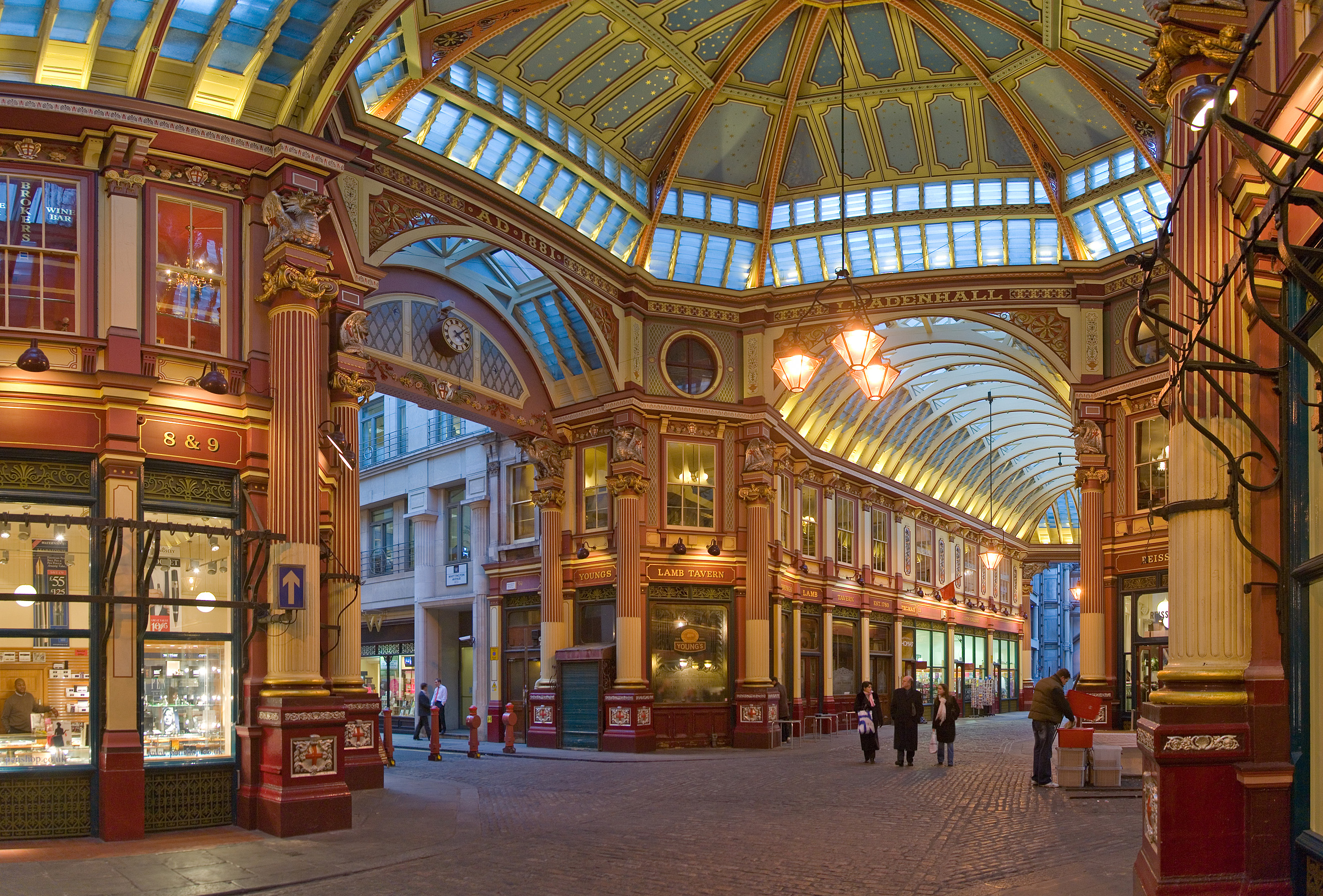
Leadenhall Market (interior), 2006

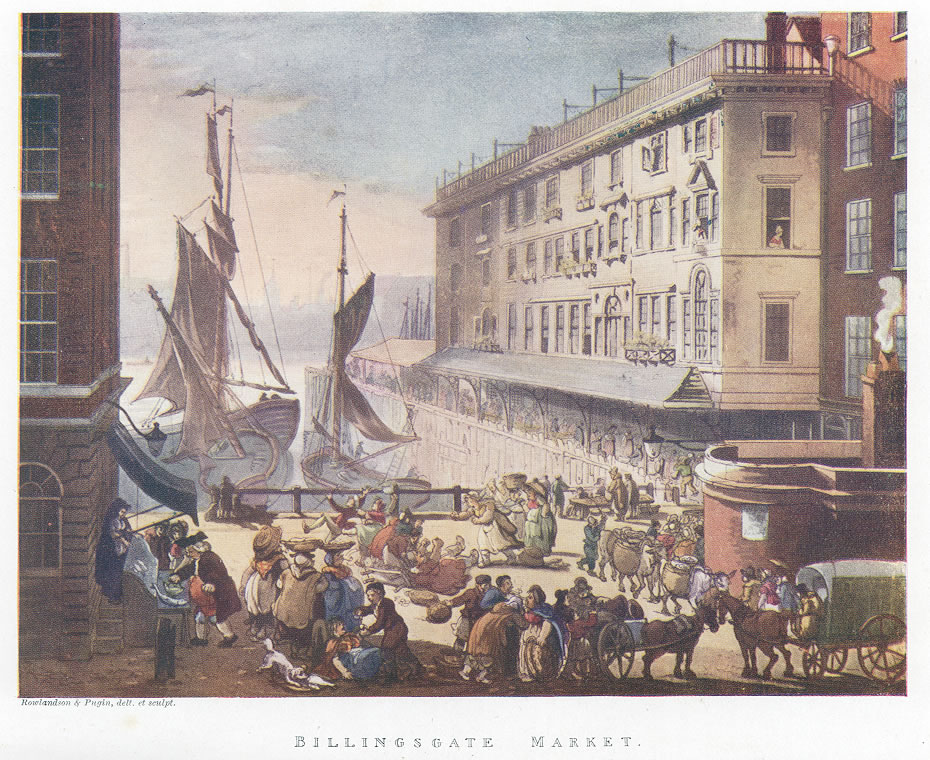
Billingsgate Fish Market, circa 1808

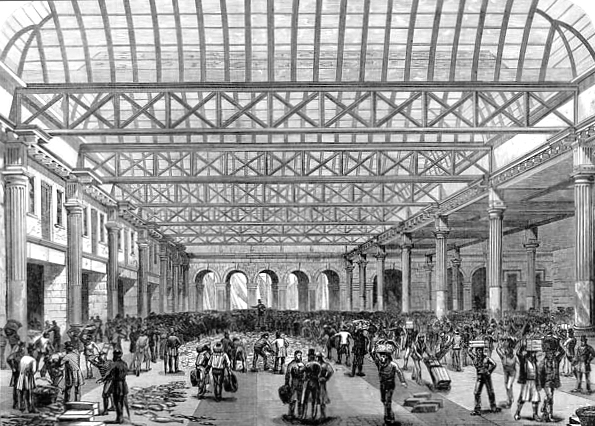
Billingsgate Fish Market, interior, 1876

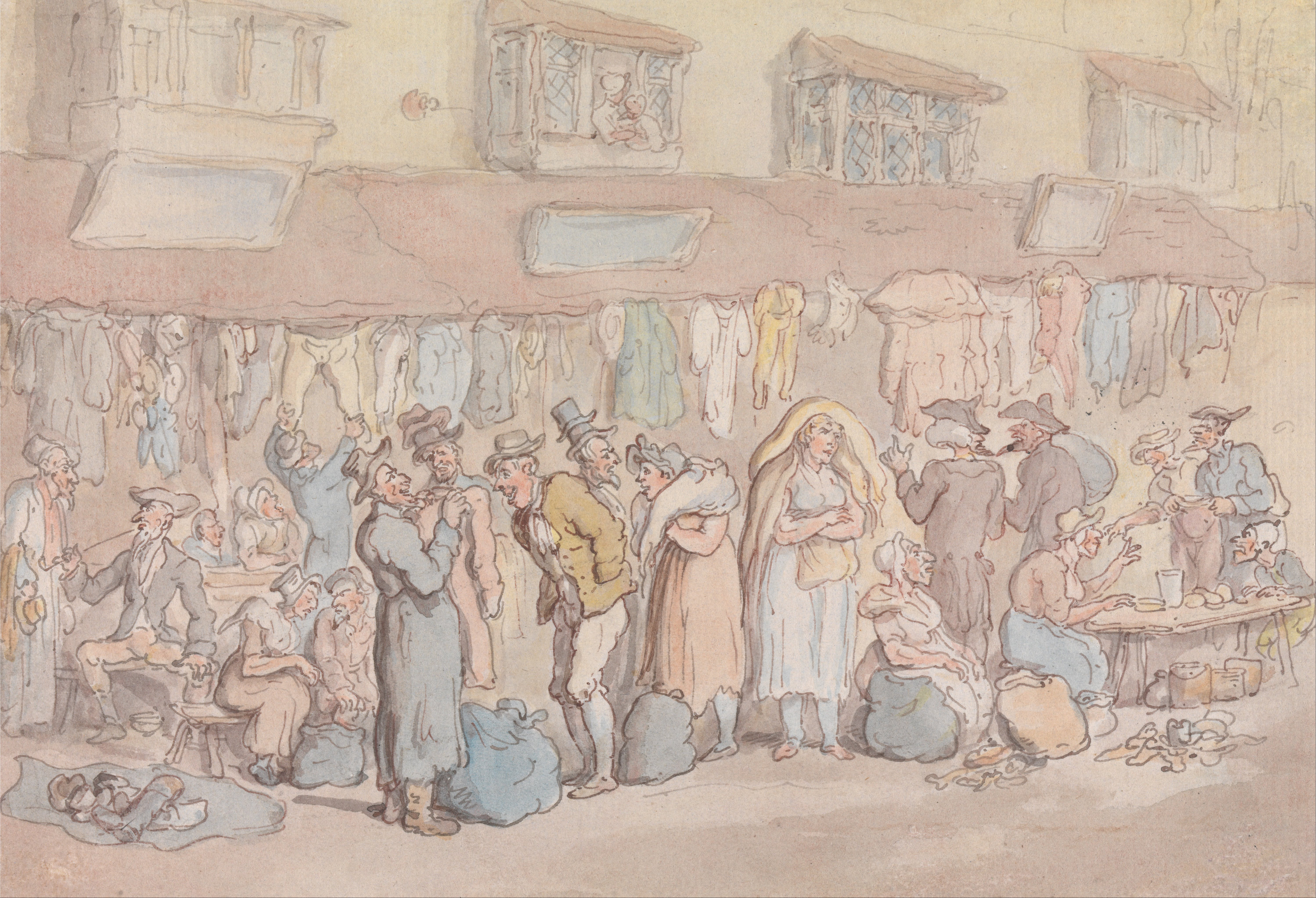
Rag Fair (now Petticoat Lane Market) by Thomas Rowlandson, late 18th century

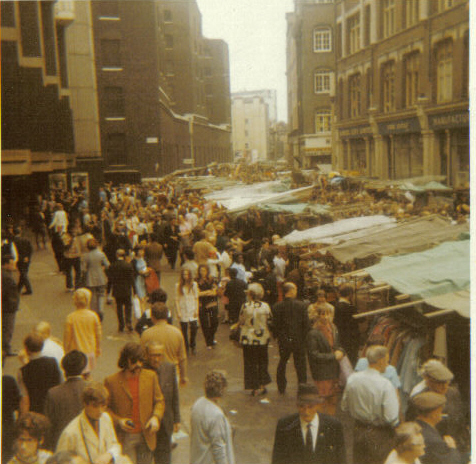
Petticoat Lane Market, London, 1971

Wholesale markets in London

- New Covent Garden Market
- Borough Market
- Old Billingsgate Market
- Leadenhall Market
- Smithfield Market
- Spitalfields Market

Retail markets in London

- Bermondsey Market
- Brick Lane Market
- Broadway Market
- Camden Market
- Chalton Street Market
- Earlham Street Market
- Inverness Street Market
- Islington Farmers' Market
- Goodge Place Market
- Greenwich Market
- Hungerford Market
- Leadenhall Market
- Leather Lane Market
- Petticoat Lane Market
- Piccadilly Market
- Plender Street Market
- Portobello Road
- Queen's Crescent Market
- Swiss Cottage Market

==== Southern Europe ====
===== Greece =====
Street markets in Greece are called laikes agores (λαϊκές αγορές) in plural, or laiki agora (λαϊκή αγορά) in singular, meaning "people's market". They are very common all over Greece, including the capital, Athens. Regular (weekly) morning markets sell mostly fresh produce from farming cooperatives – fruit, vegetables, fish, and flowers/plants. Some household items and prepared foods are often available.

Annual street markets (panigyri(a)) occur around churches on the day of their patron saint. These take place in the evenings and have a more festive character, often involving attractions and food stalls. The goods sold range from clothing and accessories to household items, furniture, toys, and trinkets. Athens also has several bazaars/enclosed markets.

- New Market (Nea Agora), Rhodes Island, Greece
- Central Municipal Market, Athinas Street, Athens - a 19th-century market

===== Italy =====
- Campo de' Fiori, Rome
- Mercato del Vino Chiatia Classico Gallo Nero – seasonal wine fair, Greve, Chianti
- Mostra Mercato Internazionale dell'Artigiano – seasonal handicrafts market, Fortezza da Basso
- Mostra Mercato Internazionale dell'Antiquaratio – seasonal antiques' market, Palazzo Shrozzi
- Mercato centrale di San Lorenzo, Florence
- Testaccio Market, Rome

====== Ancient and historic Italian market places ======
- Trajan's Market, Rome – ruins of ancient market place
- Loggia de Mercato Nuovo, Florence, built between 1547 and 1551 by Giovanni Battista del Tasso and is currently under restoration
- Loggia de Mercado Vecchio, now demolished
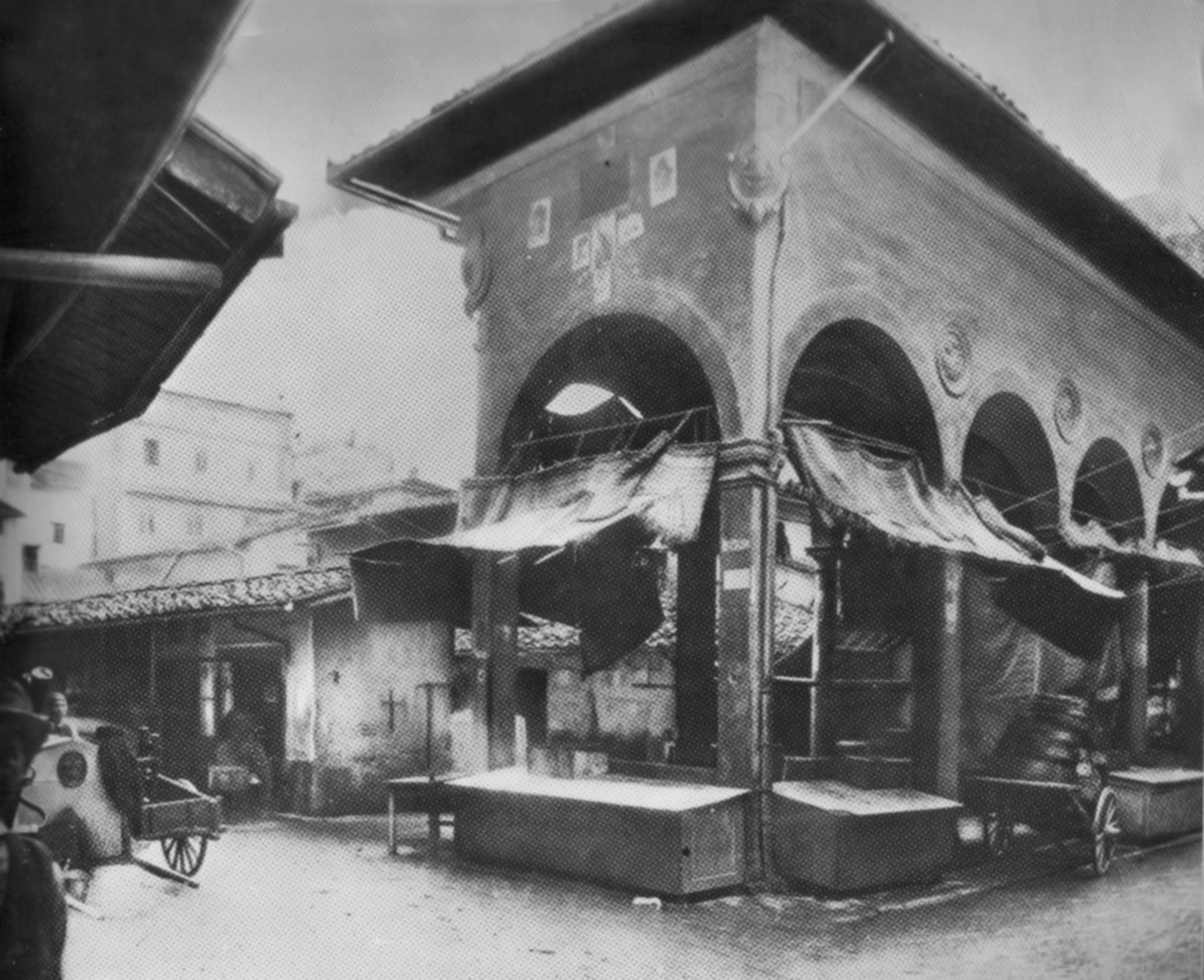
Loggia del pesce, Mercato Vecchi, before its demolition in the 1880s

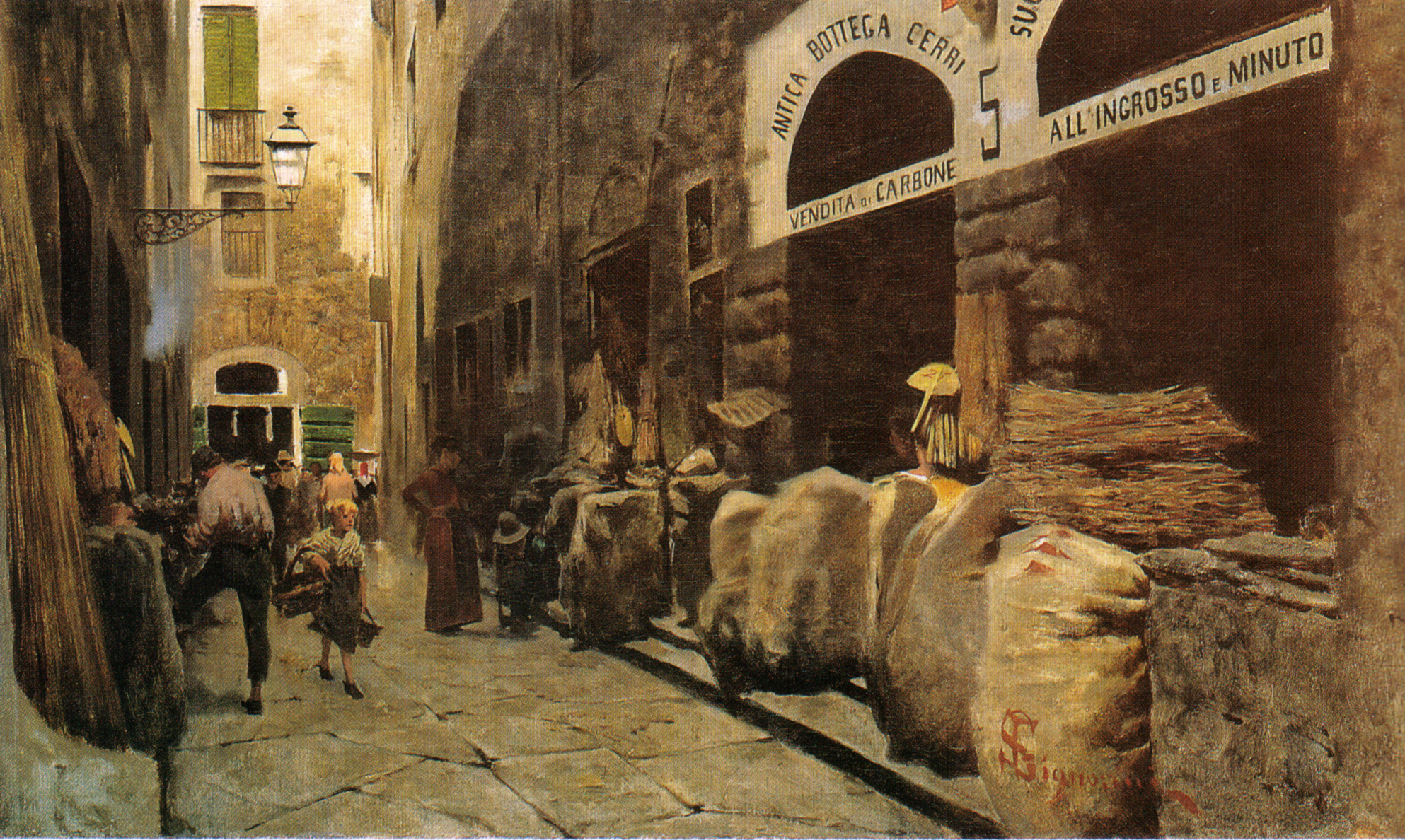
La Via del Fuoco and Mercato Vecchio, painting by Telemaco Signorini, c. 1881

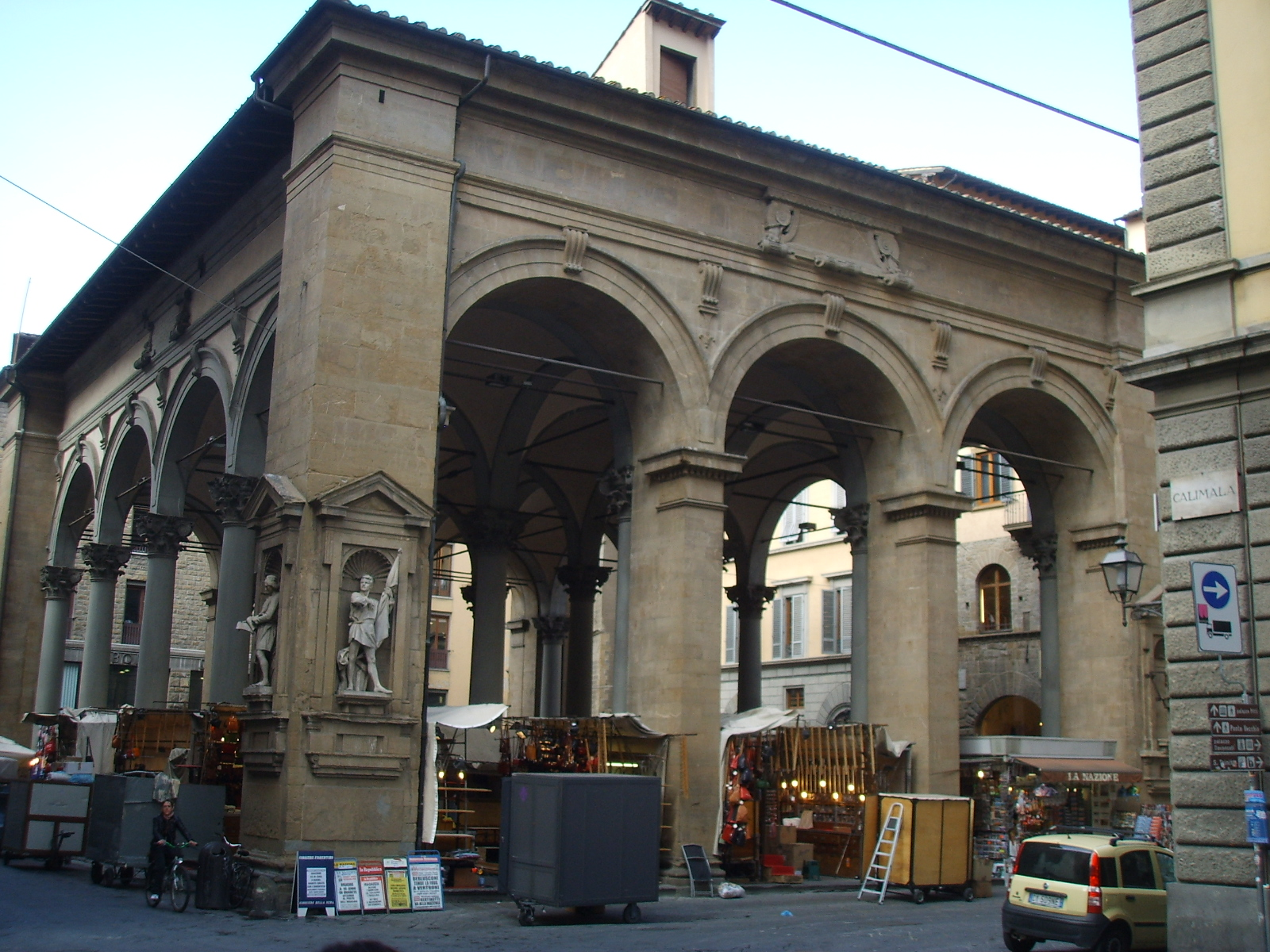
Loggia del Mercato Nuovo in 2008 (exterior)

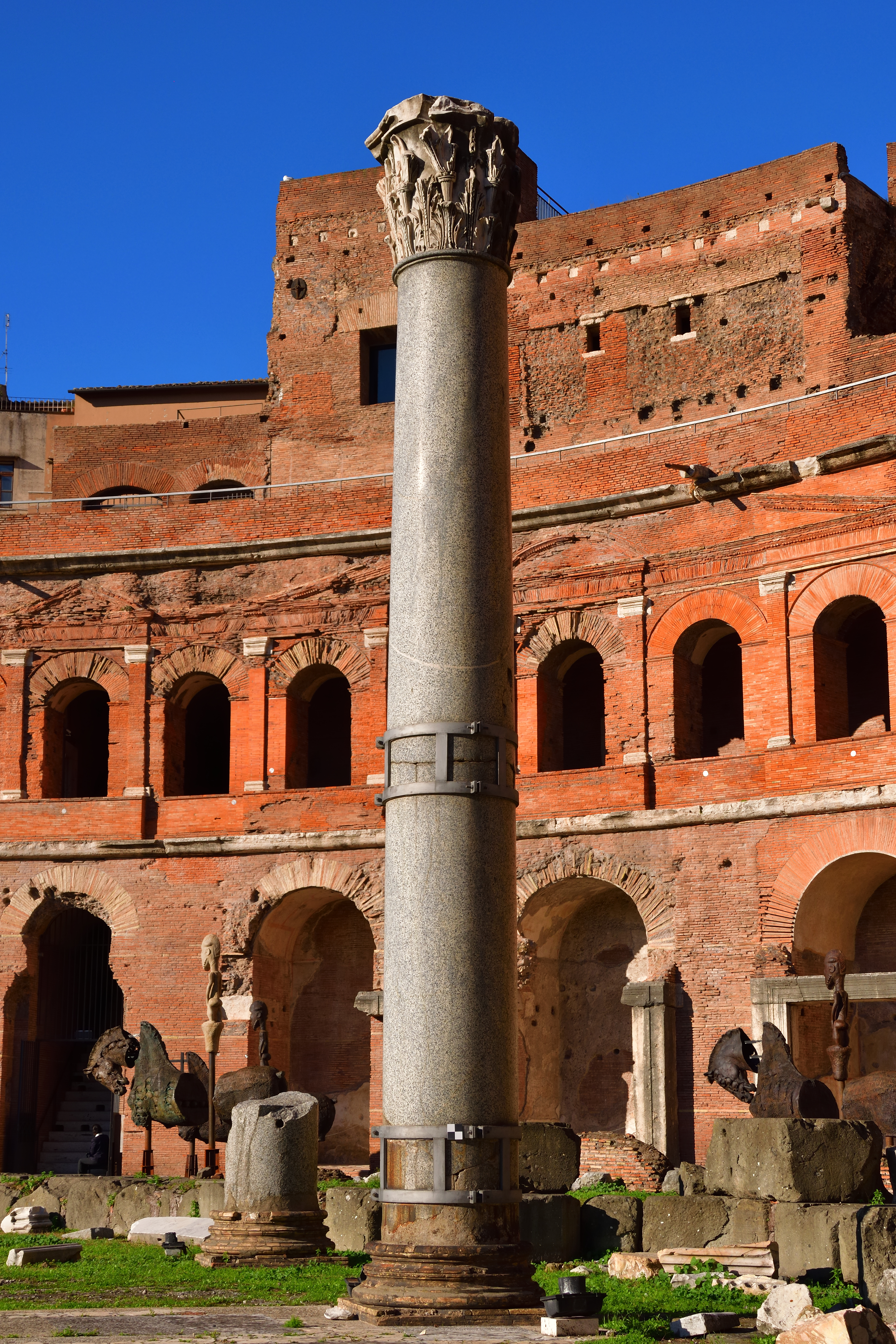
Trajan's Market, Rome (ruins)

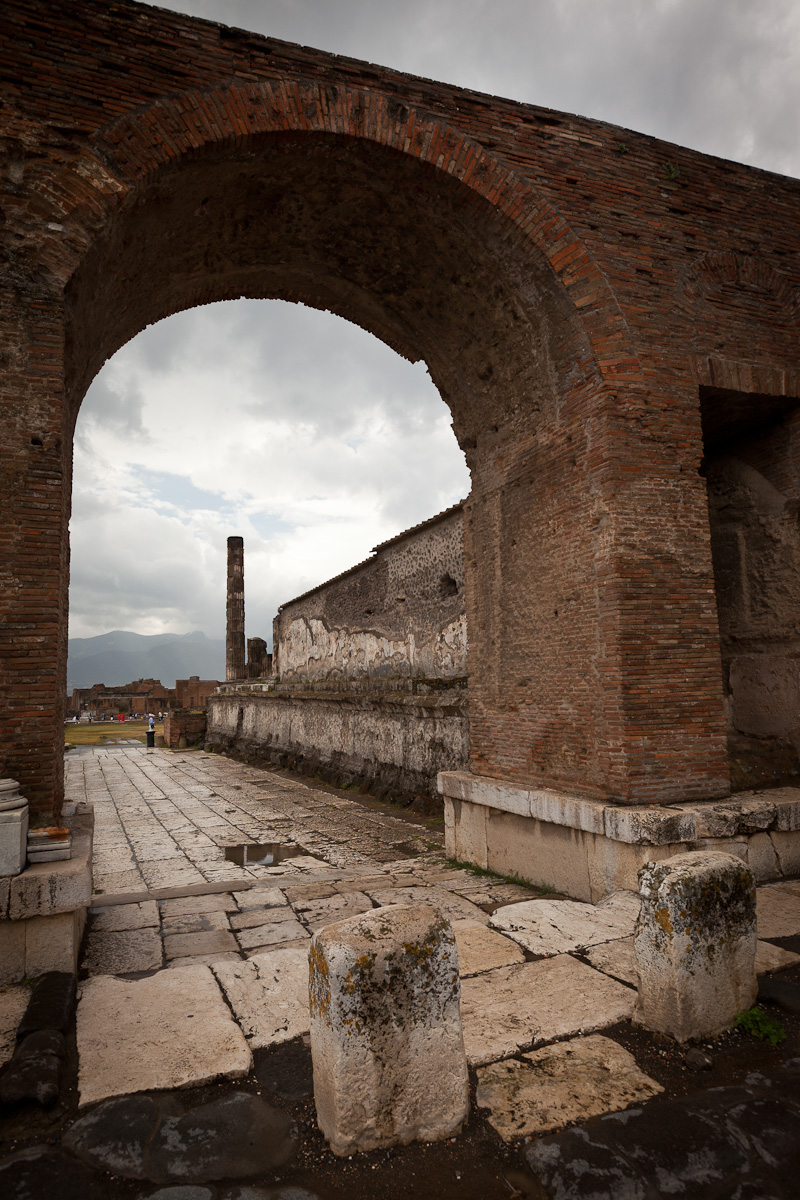
Entrance to Market place, Pompeii

===== Spain =====
In Spain, two types of retail market can be identified; permanent markets and periodic markets. Permanent markets are typically housed in a building dedicated to the use of stallholders and vendors. Periodic markets appear in the streets and plazas on specific days, such as weekends or festival days and most often sell products made by local artisans including leather goods, fashion accessories, especially scarves and costume jewellery. Vendors at periodic markets typically erect tents or canvas awnings to provide some type of temporary cover for themselves and shoppers. Produce markets, farmers' markets and flea markets are all commonplace. In addition, street vendors are a relatively common sight across most parts of Spain. Street vendors roam around in search of a suitable venue such as a plaza, entrance to a railway station or beach front where they lay their goods out on mats. Products sold by street vendors are of highly variable quality.

====== Barcelona ======
The first reliable recorded references to markets in Barcelona date to the 10th century. Barcelona, at that time, was a walled city and the first open-air market was held outside the walls, (in the area now known as Plaça de l'Àngel). A merchant district soon grew up around the market. During the 19th century, numerous covered markets were erected, specifically Santa Caterina Market (1844); Sant Josep (c. 1840), Llibertat (1875), Sant Antoni (1882), Barceloneta (1884), Concepció and Hostafrancs (1888), Clot and Poblenou (1889), and Abaceria in Gracia (1892).

Barcelona residents are well served by the city's 39 produce markets. Every barri (suburb) has at least one fresh produce market. Barcelona's markets attract some 62 million visits yearly, turnover €950 million and employ 7,500 people.

Some of the larger produce markets still in operation include: Mercat de La Boqueria in El Raval; Mercat de Sant Antoni in Sant Antoni; Mercat de Sant Andreu in Sant Andreu; Mercat de Santa Caterina in L'Eixample, Mercat del Ninot in L'Eixample; Mercat de la Concepció also in L'Eixample; Mercat de la Llibertat in Gràcia; Mercat de Sants in Sants-Montjuïc; Mercat de Galvany in Sarrià-Sant Gervasi; Mercat de Vall d'Hebron. In addition, Barcelona offers many non-food markets including the street market; La Rambla de les Flors; Dominical de Sant Antoni; Encants de Sant Antoni; and Mercat Encants Barcelona - Fira de Bellcaire.

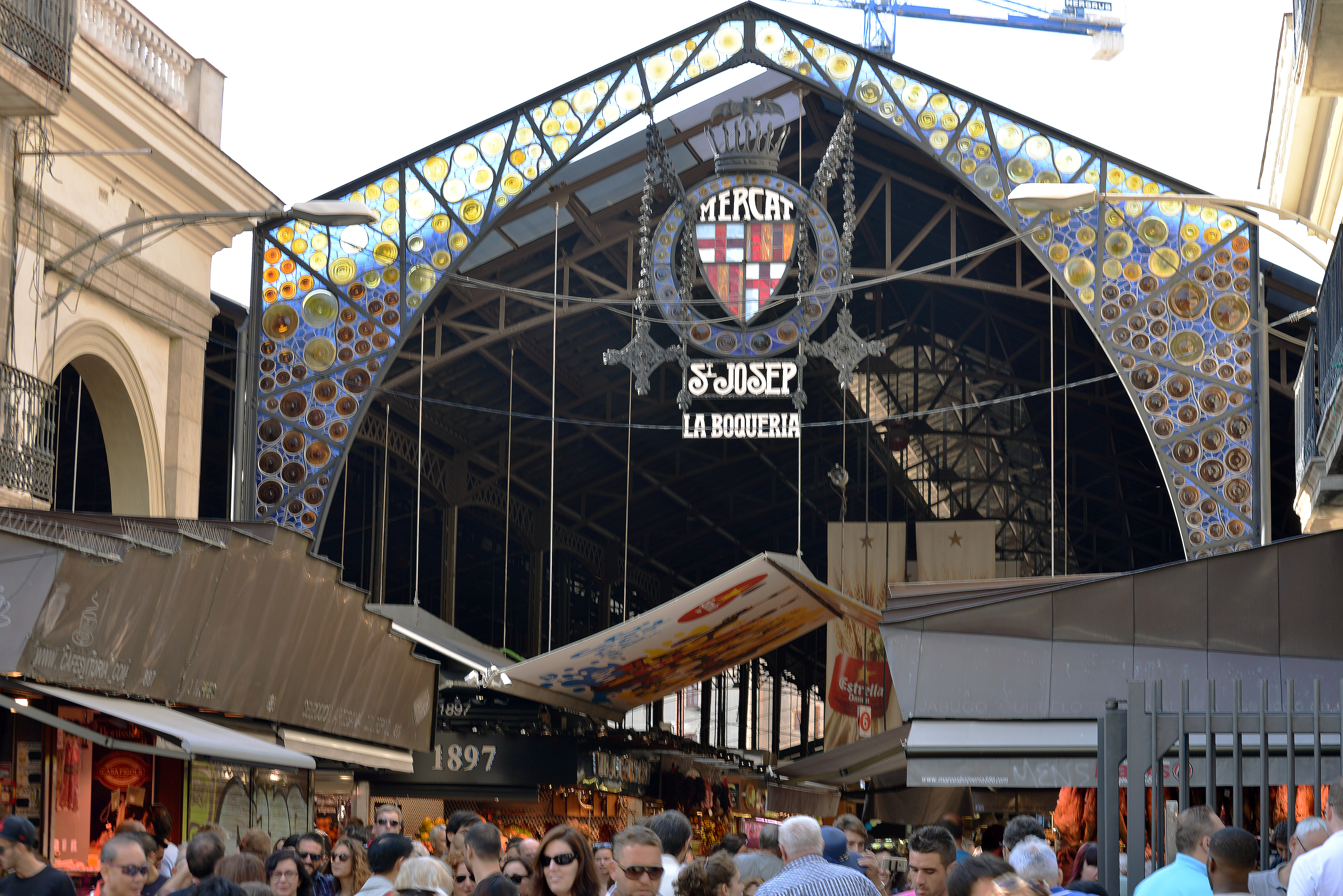
Main entrance to the Mercat de San Josep, known simply as La Boqueria

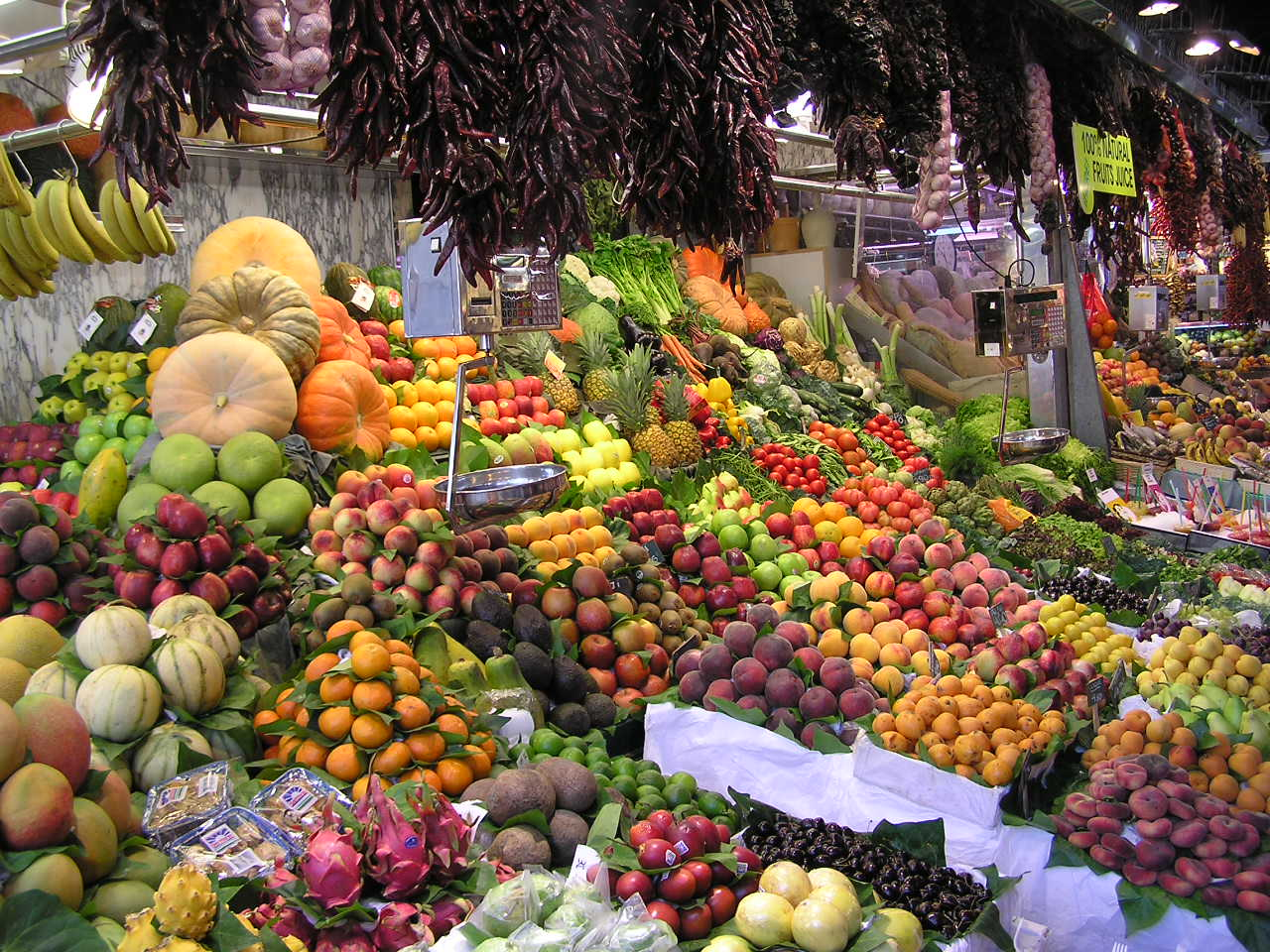
Fruit display at Mercat de La Boqueria in La Rambla, Barcelona

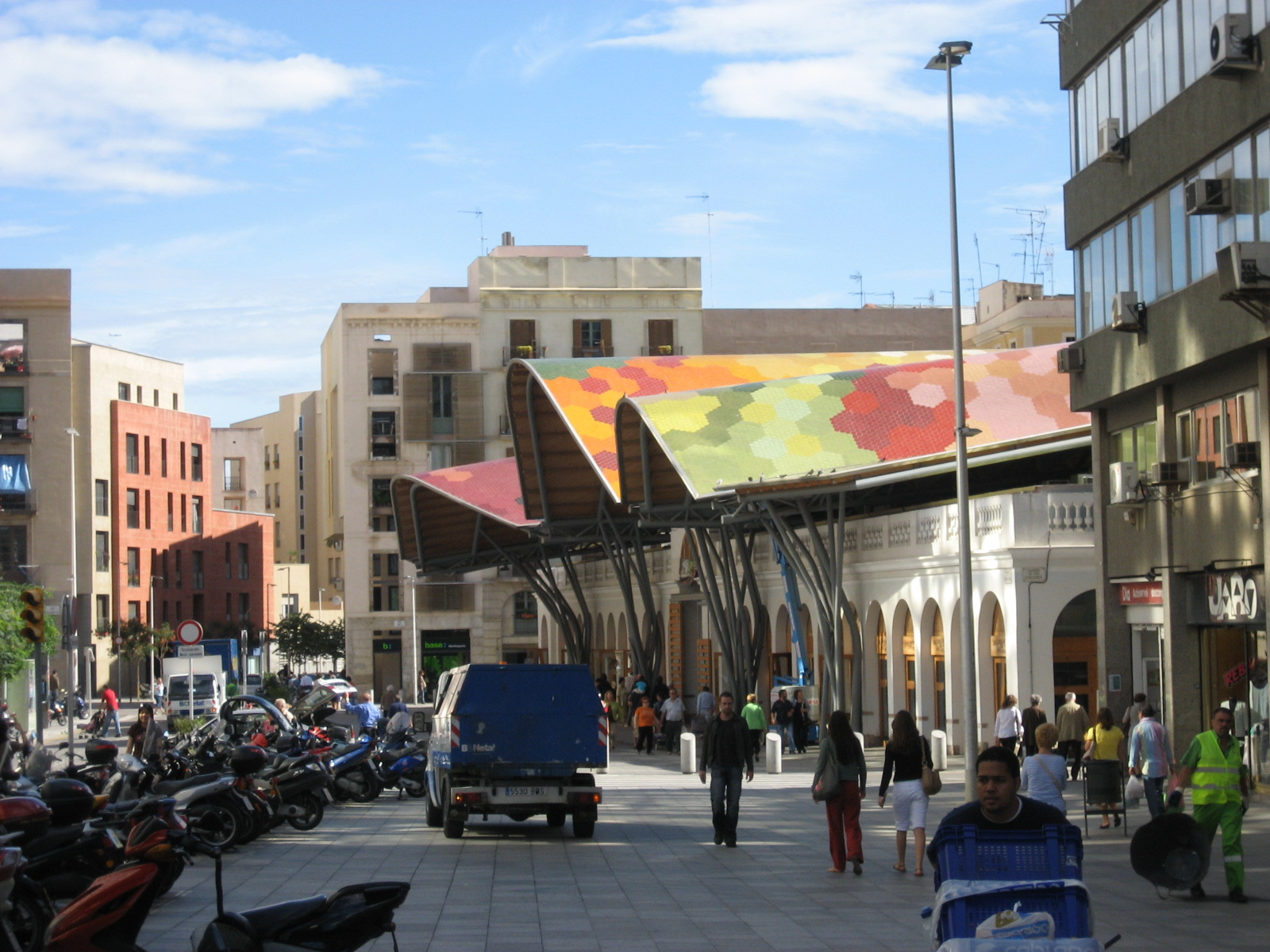
Mercat de Santa Caterina, Barcelona

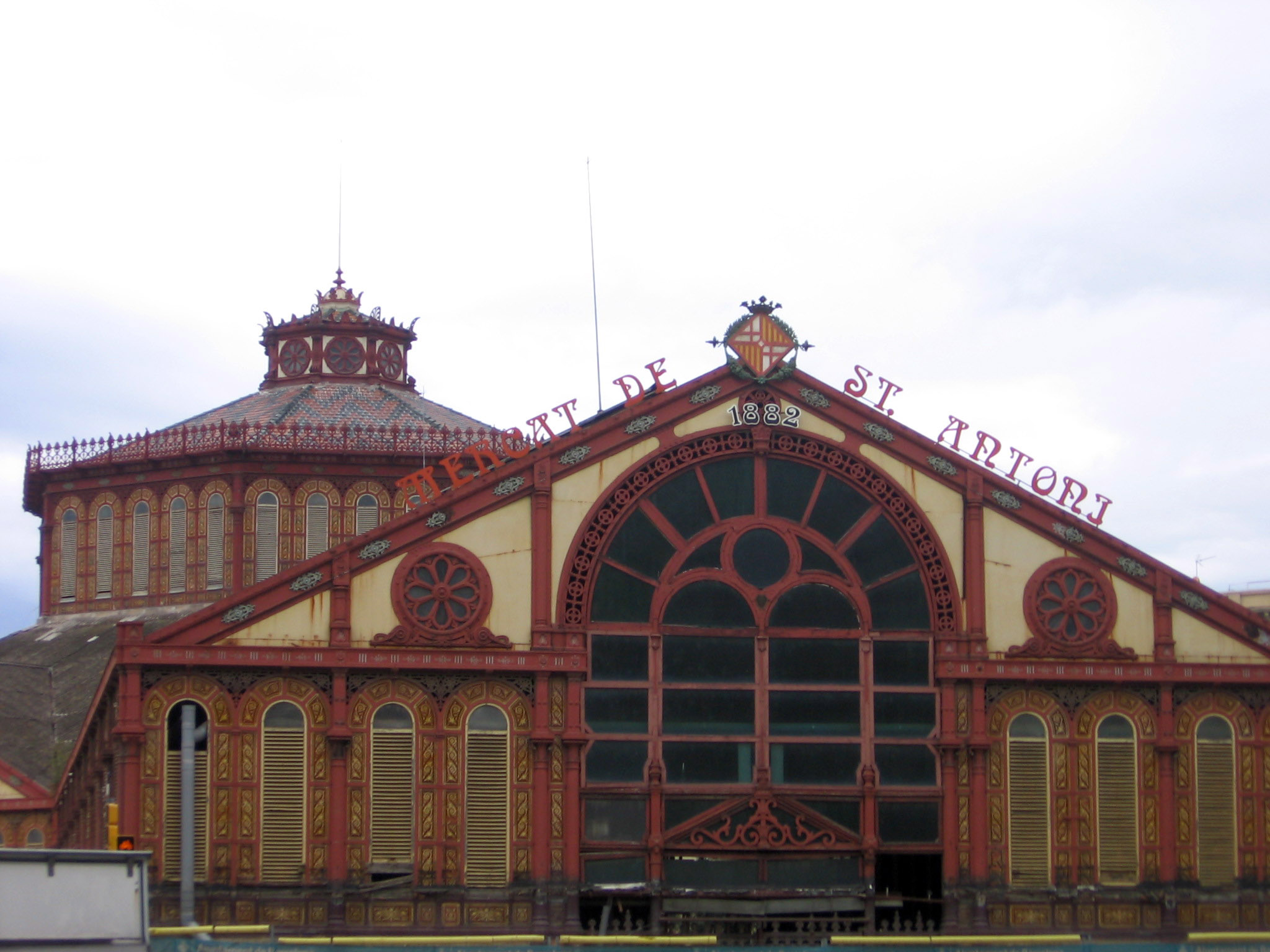
Mercat de San Antoni, Barcelona

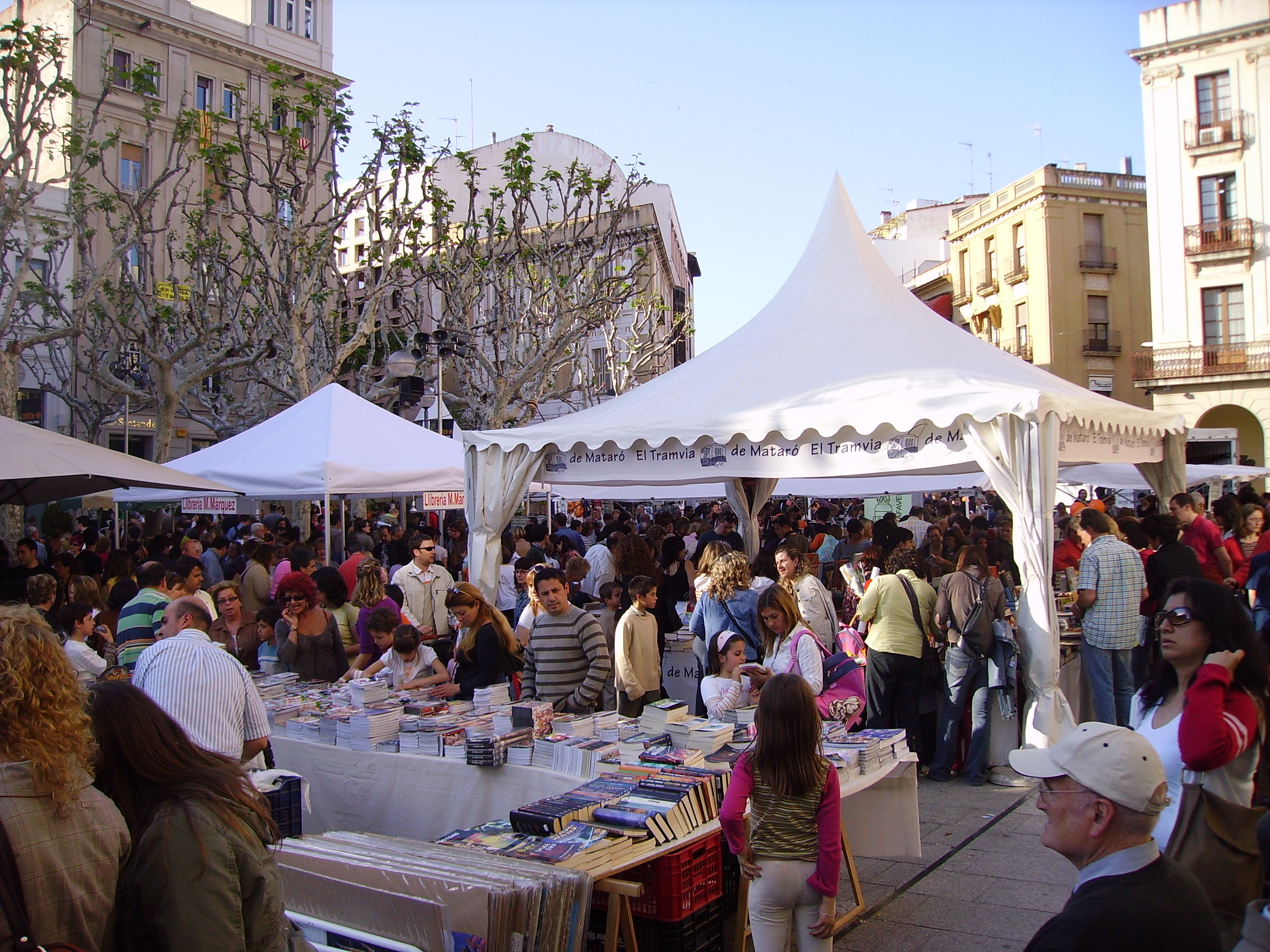
Street market at Sant Jordi, Mataró

====== Bilbao ======
- Mercado de la Ribera

====== Madrid ======
The main markets in central Madrid are San Anton Market; San Miguel Market, a gourmet tapas market; Cámera Agraria (Madrid Farmers' Market); and El Rastro, the largest open air flea market.

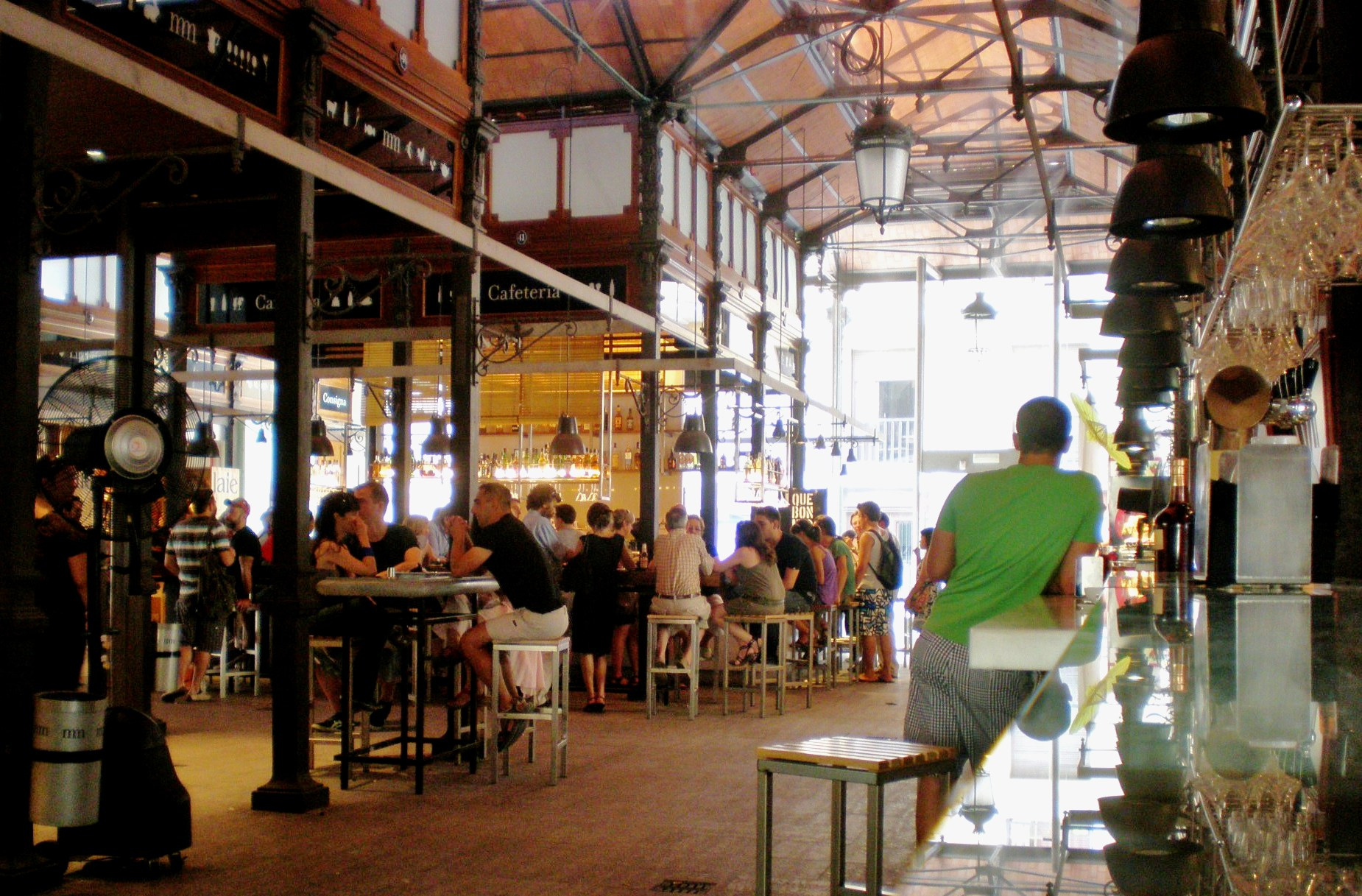
Mercado de San Miguel (interior)

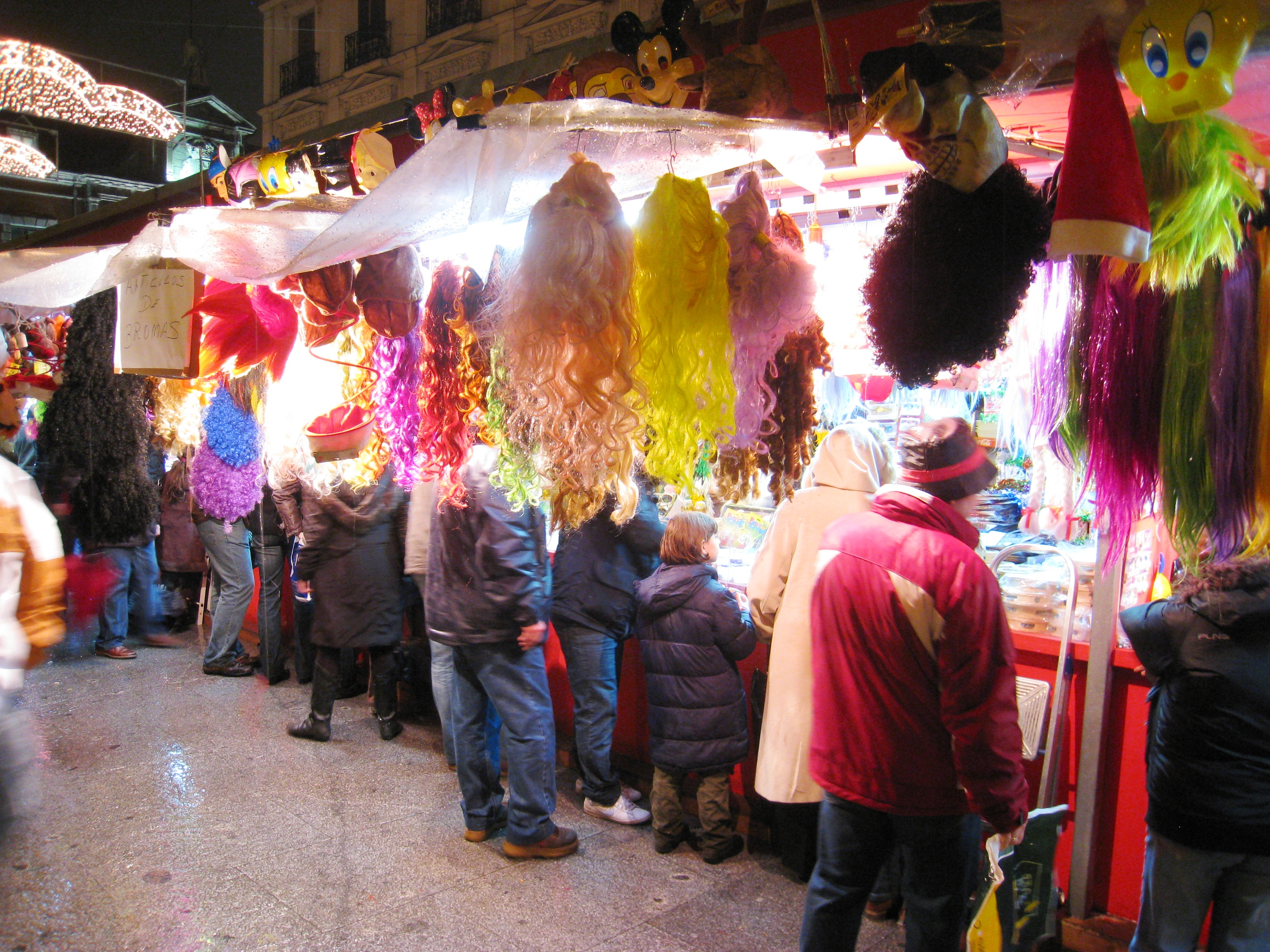
Night market in December, Madrid

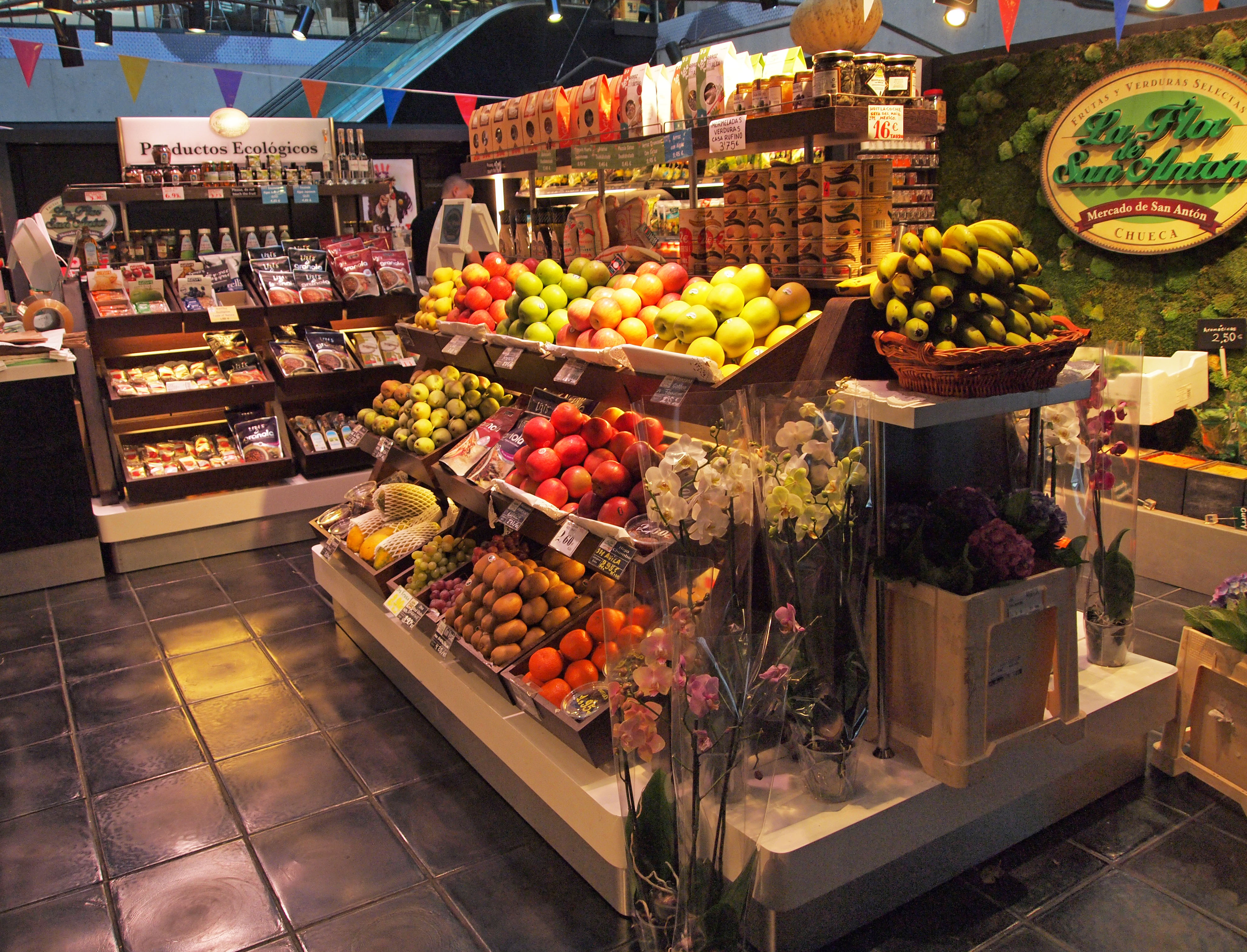
Mercado de San Anton, Madrid

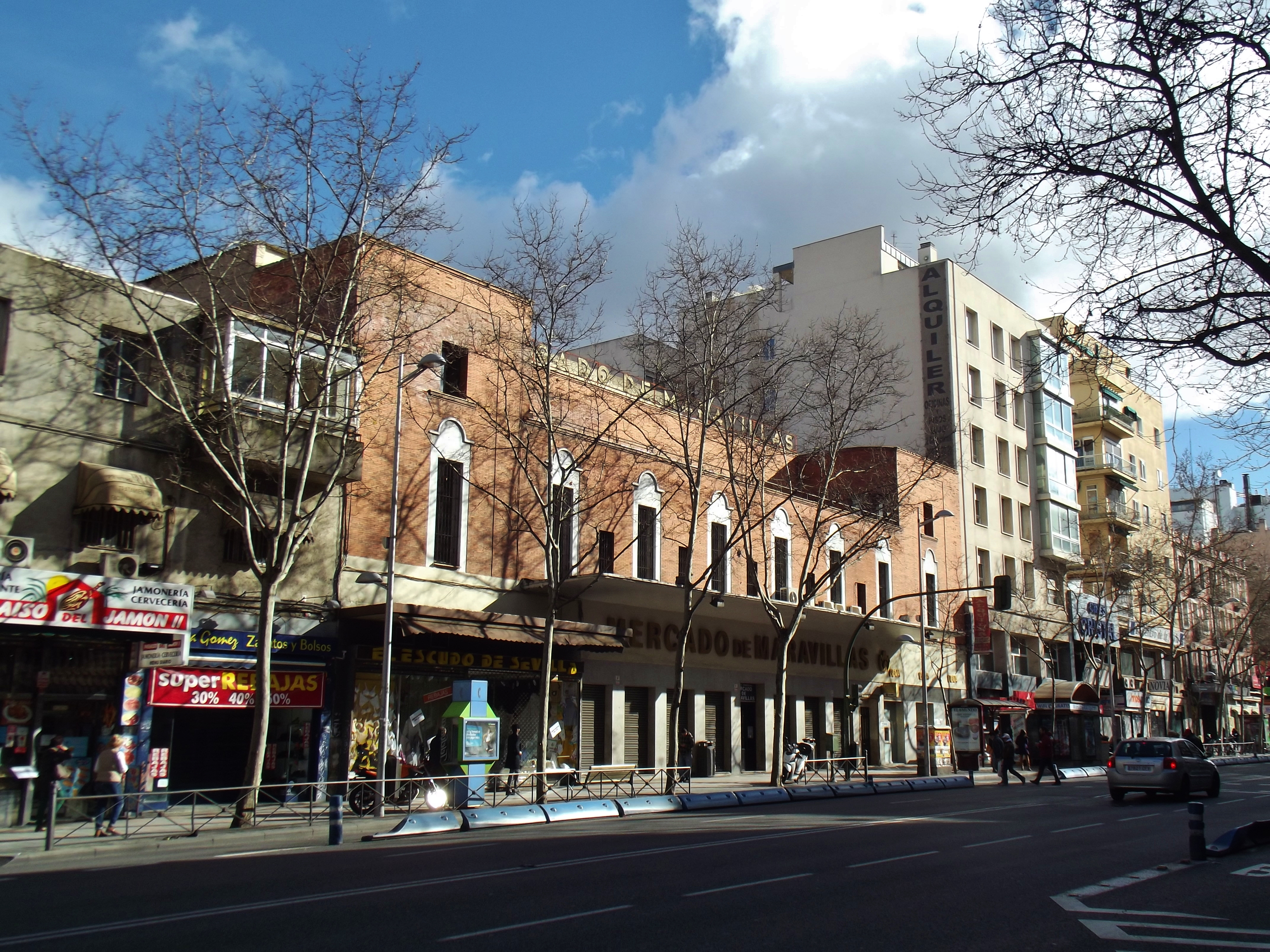
Mercado de Maravillas, calle Bravo Murillo, Madrid

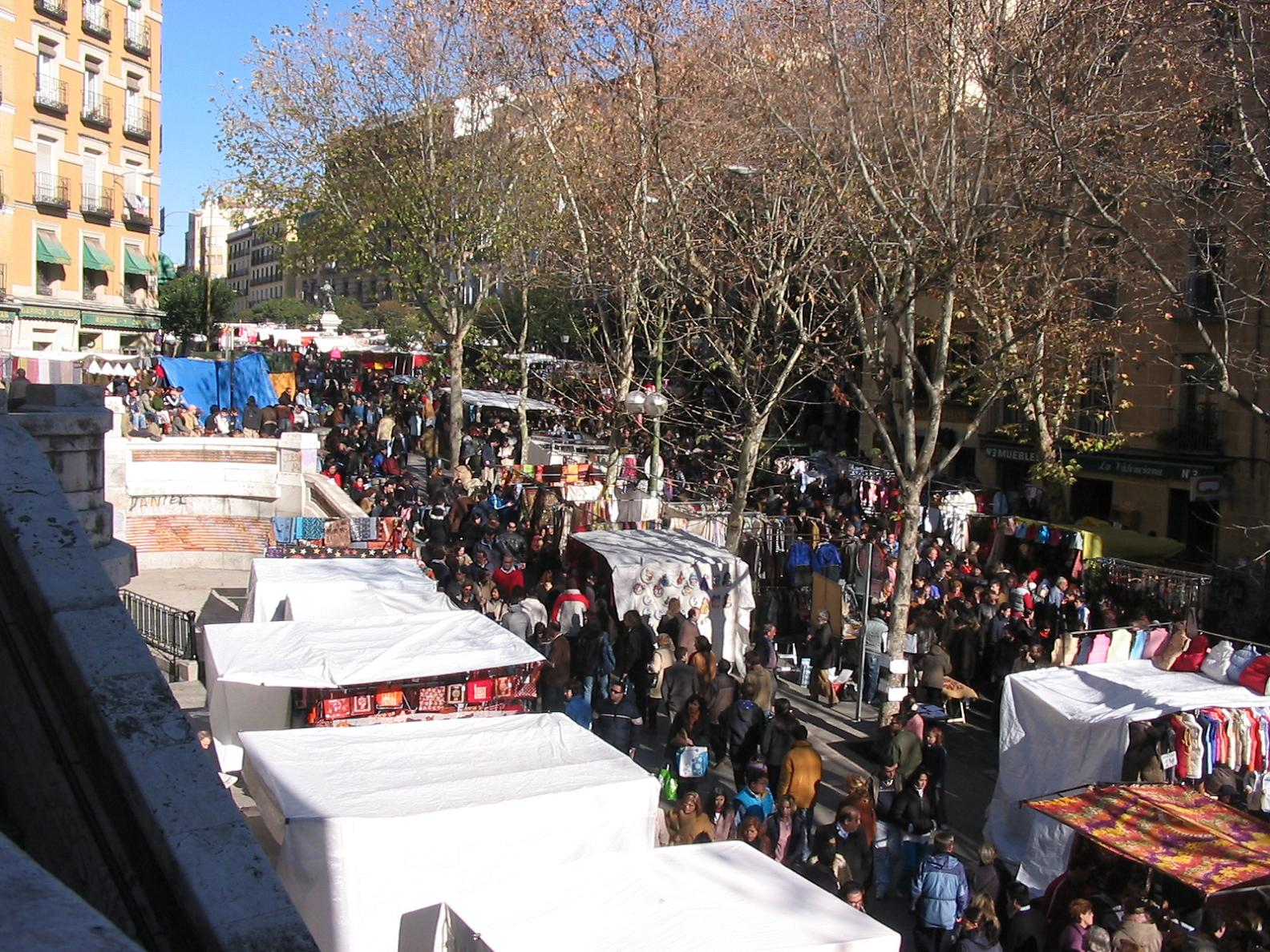
El Rastro Madrid, the largest flea market

====== Valencia ======
The Mercat or Mercado Central is the main public market in Valencia. Built at the turn of the twentieth century, the building combines Gothic and Art Nouveau architectural features. Popular with both locals and visitors, a distinctive feature is the quality of fresh fish and seafood, which once purchased can be taken to the street stalls around the perimeter of the market who will cook it to order. The Mercado de Colón in Eixample, Valencia is also a very popular fresh produce market.

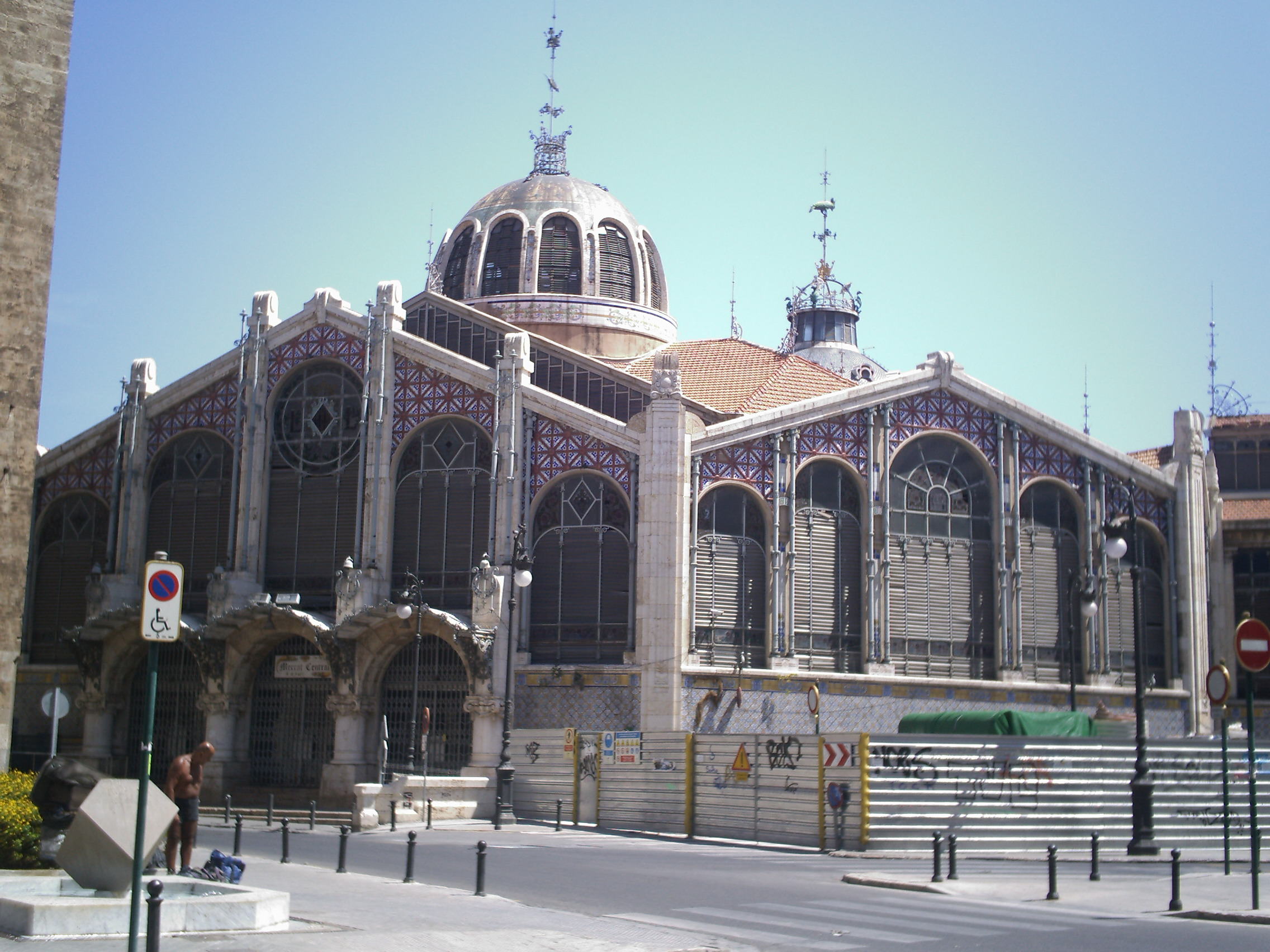
Mercado Central (exterior)

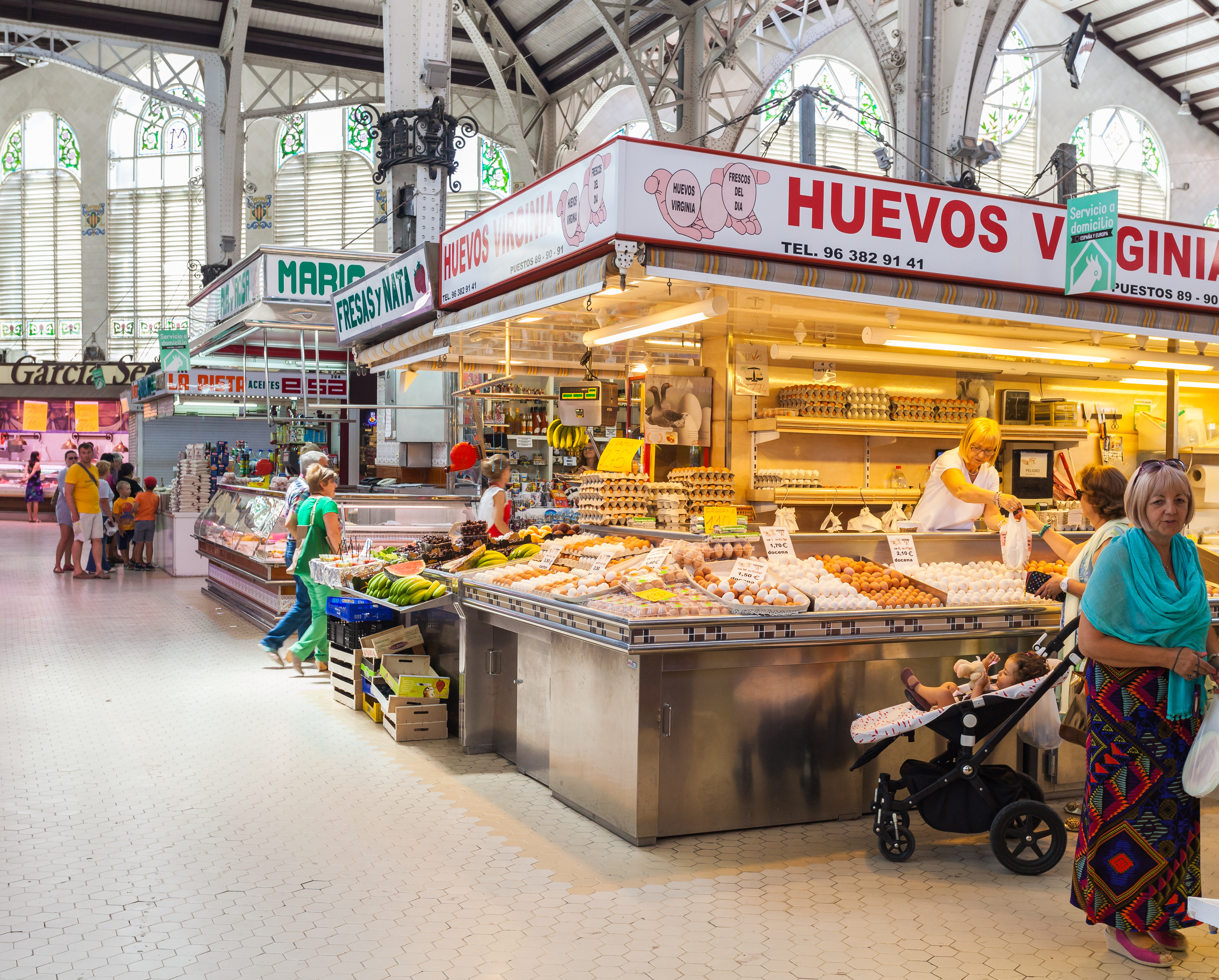
Mercado Central, Valencia (interior)

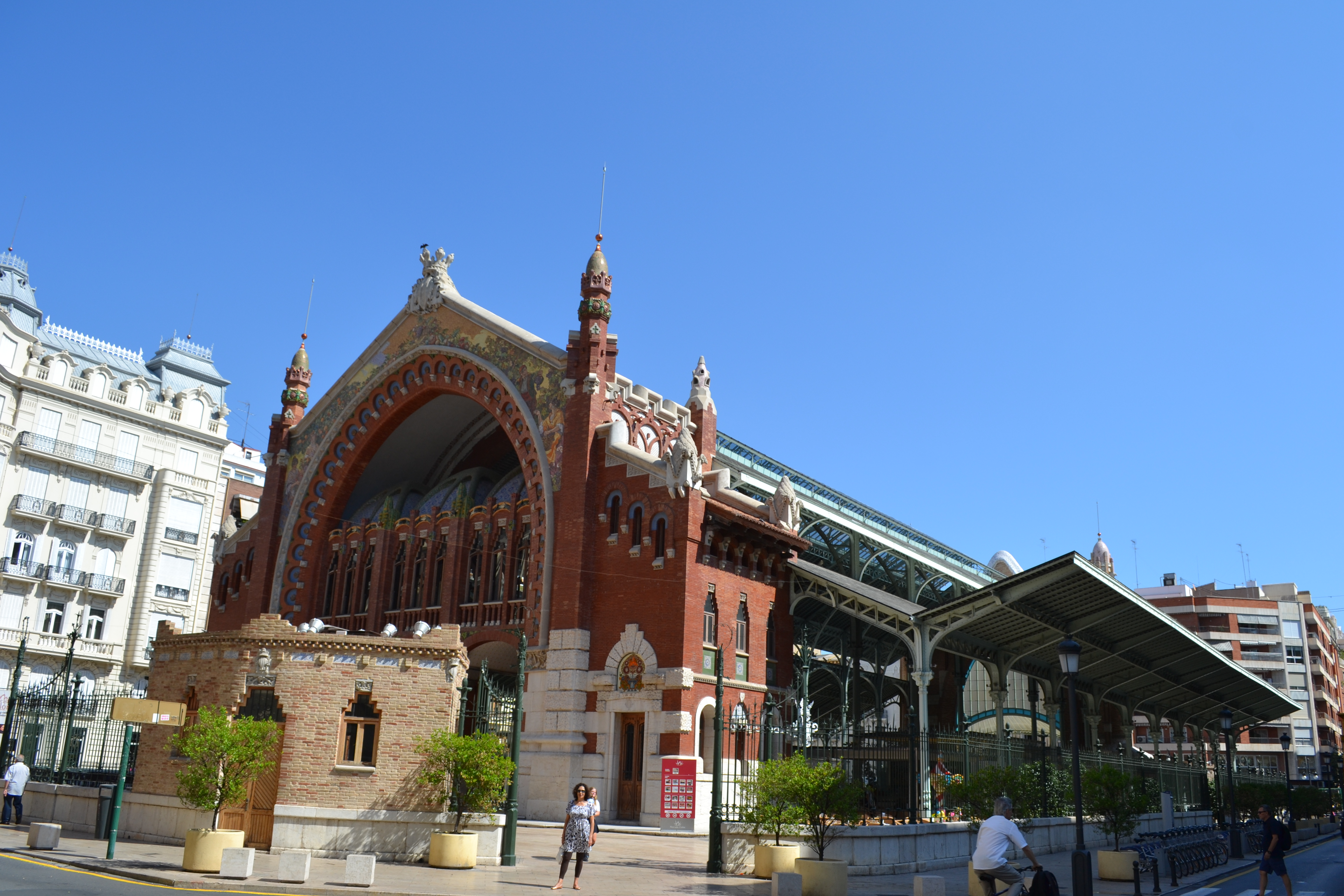
Mercado de Colón (exterior)

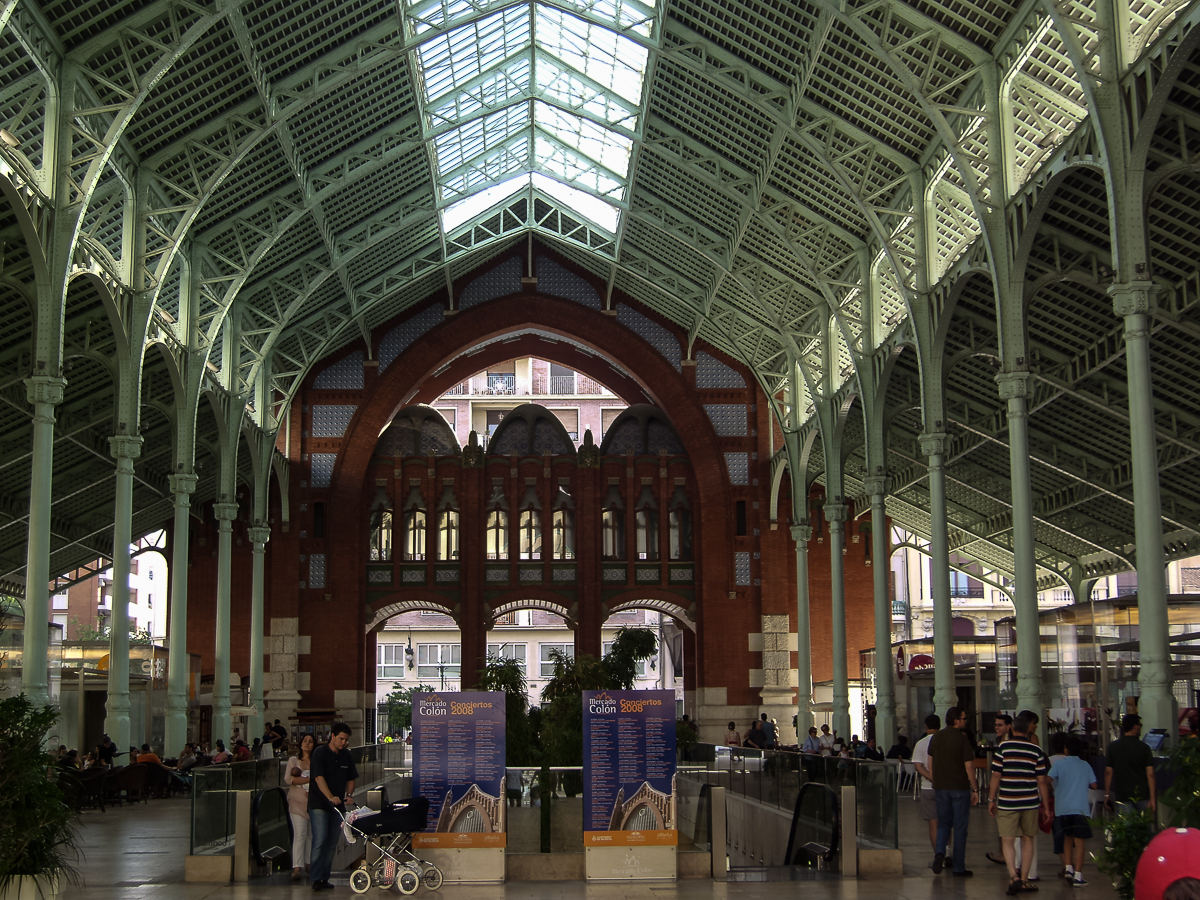
Mercado de Colón (interior)

====== Seville ======
Popular markets in Seville include the Triana market and the Central market housed within the Metropol Parasol complex. In addition, Seville offers many smaller neighbourhood markets such as Mercado de la Calle Feria and Mercado de la Encarnación.

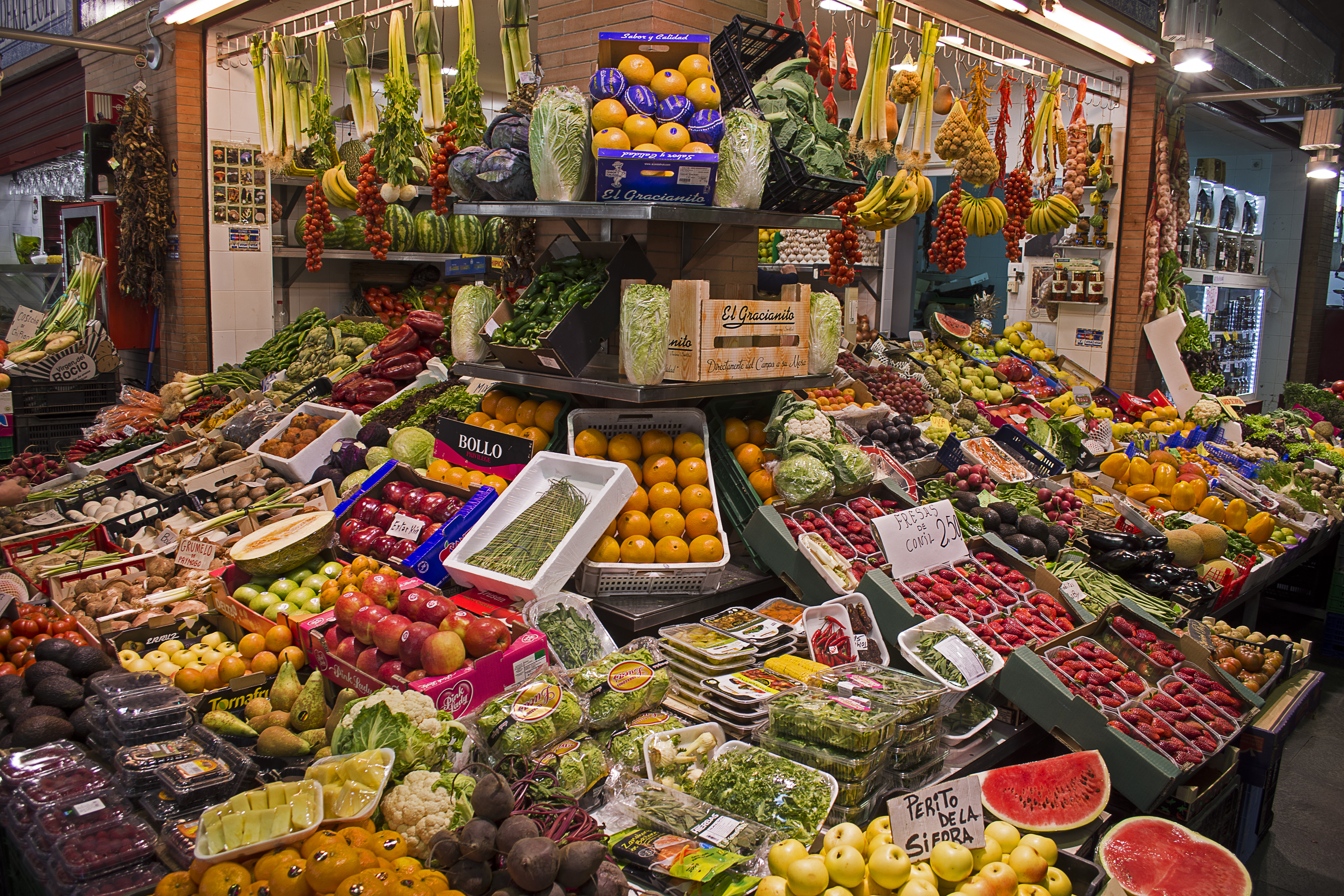
Mercado Triana (Triana Market)

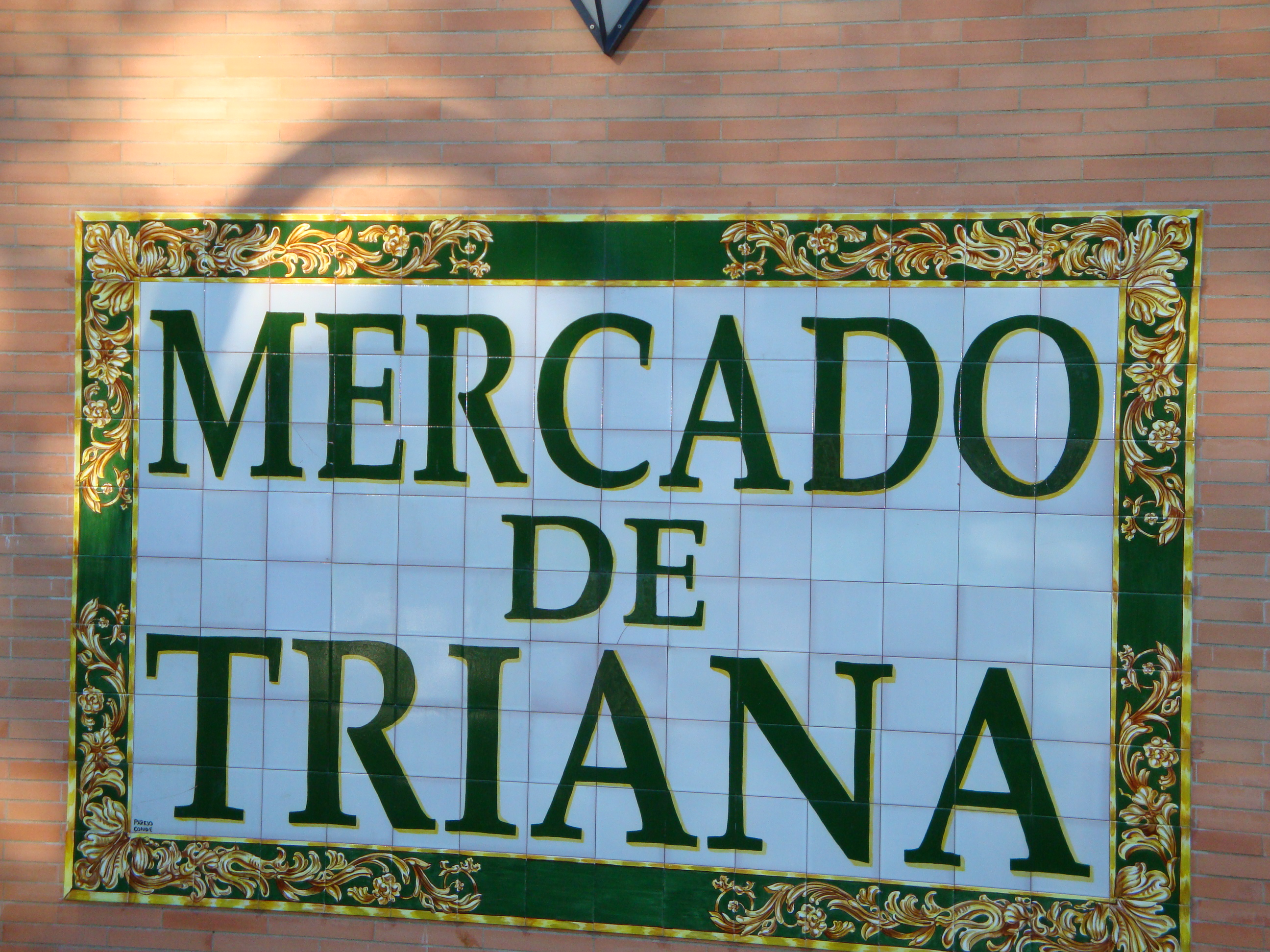
Mosaic sign for the Triana Market

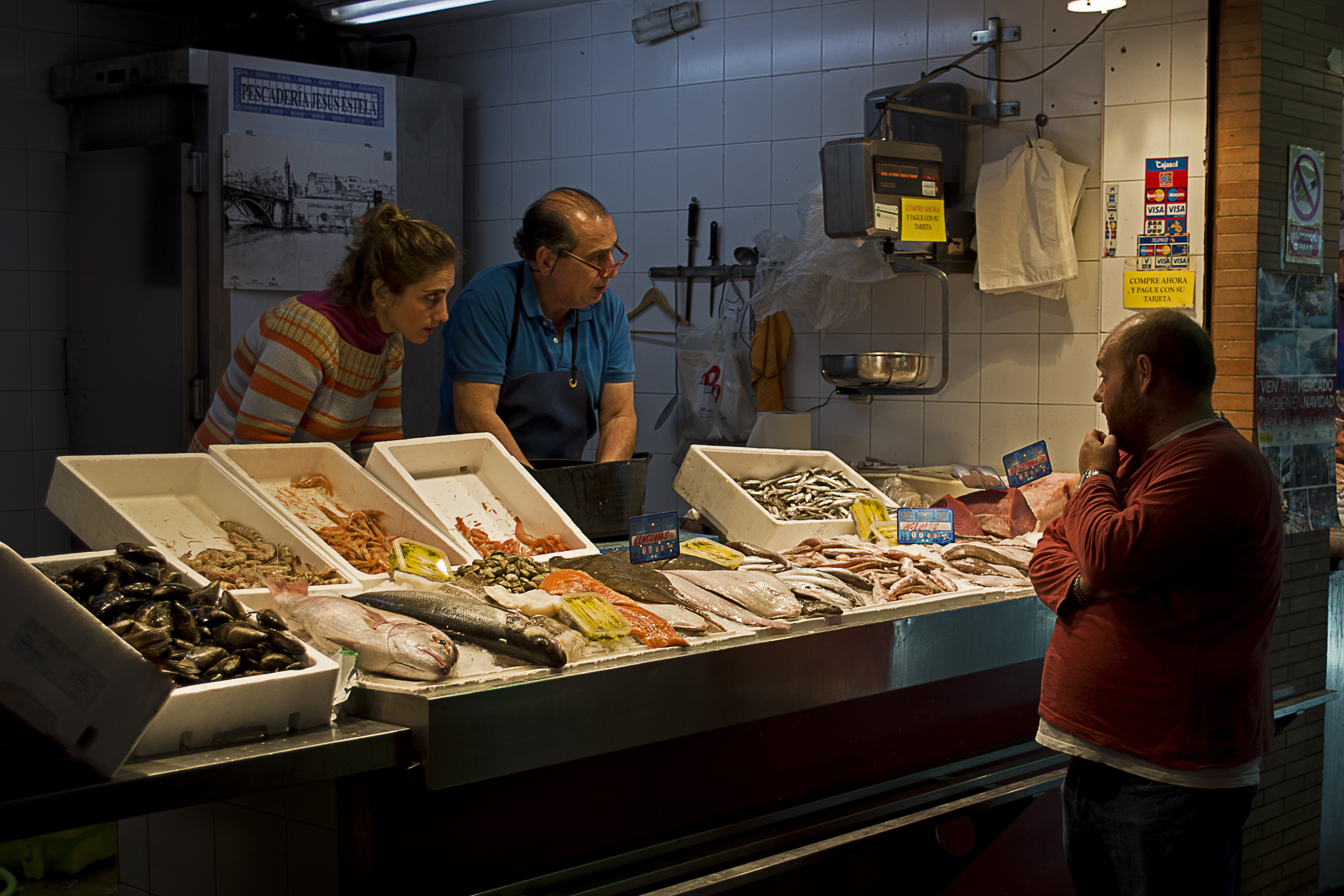
Fish vendor at the Mercado Triana

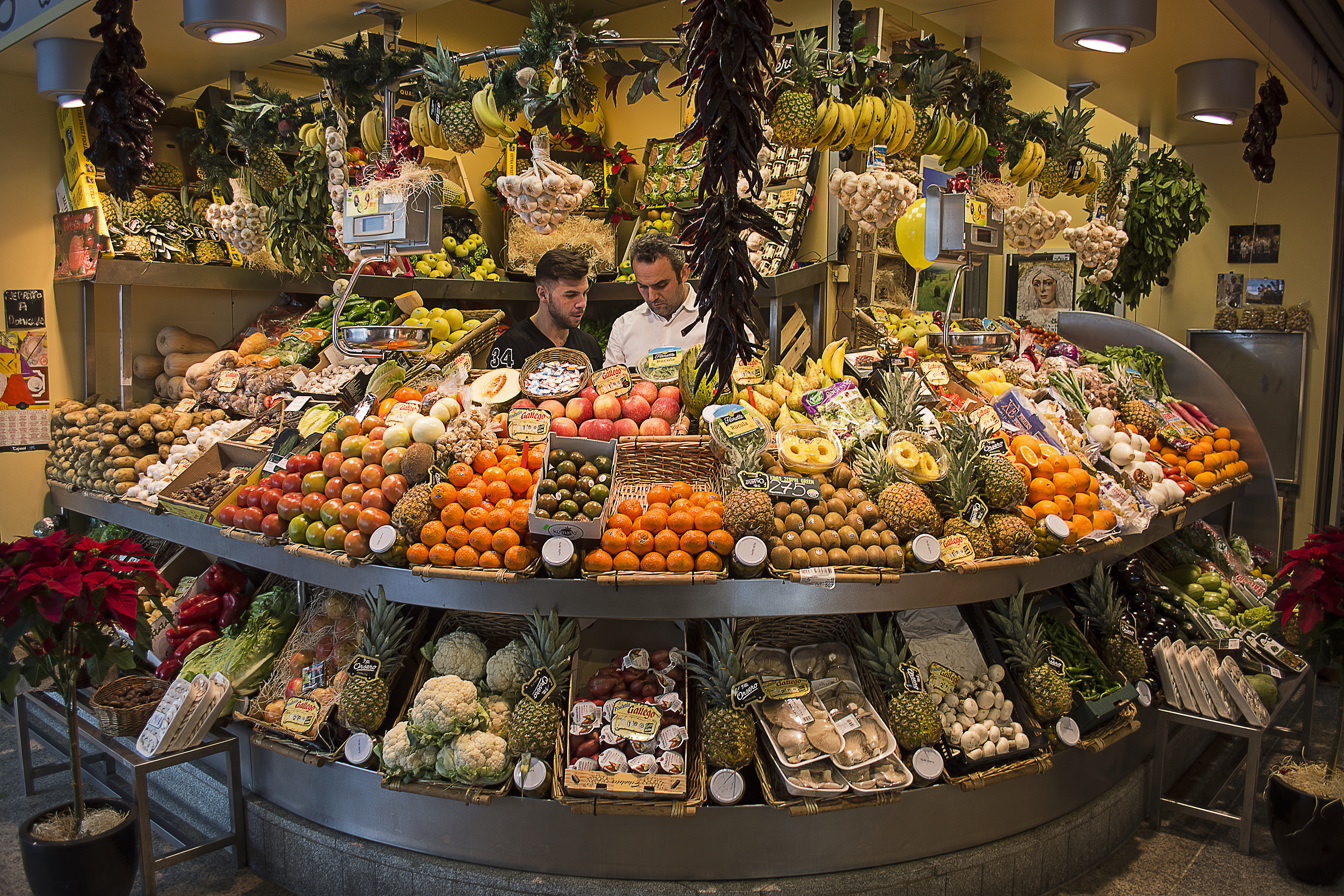
Mercado Encarnación

==== Southeastern Europe (Balkans) ====
===== Croatia =====
In Serbo-Croatian, a farmer's market is formally known as tržnica, and colloquially as pijaca, plac, or pazar depending on the region and dialect.

- Dolac, Zagreb

===== Serbia =====
In Serbo-Croatian, a farmer's market is formally known as tržnica, and colloquially as pijaca, plac, or pazar depending on region and dialect. The markets in large cities are open daily, including Sunday, from around 5 or 6 am to mid-afternoon. In smaller towns, markets often open once a week, on a specific day known as pazarni dan.

- Kalenić, Belgrade
- Great Market, Belgrade – Built in around 1854
- Vračar Square (Square of Flowers), Belgrade

=== North America ===
==== Canada ====
- Atwater Market – Montreal, Quebec
- ByWard Market – Ottawa, Ontario
- The Forks Market – Winnipeg, Manitoba
- Granville Island – Vancouver, British Columbia
- Jean Talon Market – Montreal, Quebec
- Kensington Market – Toronto, Ontario
- Lonsdale Quay – North Vancouver, British Columbia
- St. Lawrence Market – Toronto, Ontario
- Westminster Quay – New Westminster, British Columbia
- Main Street Markham Farmers' Market (Seasonal) – Markham, Ontario
- Stiver Mills Farmers' Market (Seasonal) - Markham, Ontario
- Kitchener Farmer's Market – Kitchener, Ontario
- St. Jacobs Farmers' Market – St. Jacobs, Ontario
- York Farmers Market – Markham, Ontario
- Downsview Park Farmers Market – Toronto
- Saint John City Market – Saint John, New Brunswick

Historic markets that have been converted to other uses include:

- St. Patrick's Market, Toronto – retail building
- St. Andrew's Market, Toronto – demolished 1937 and site of water works and park
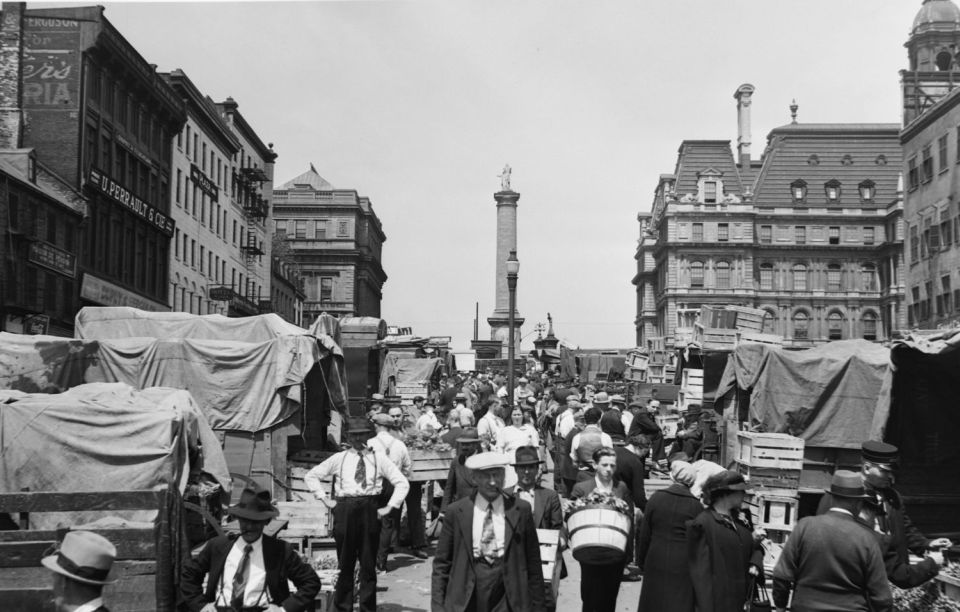
Public market at place Jacques-Cartier in Montreal, Quebec in 1940

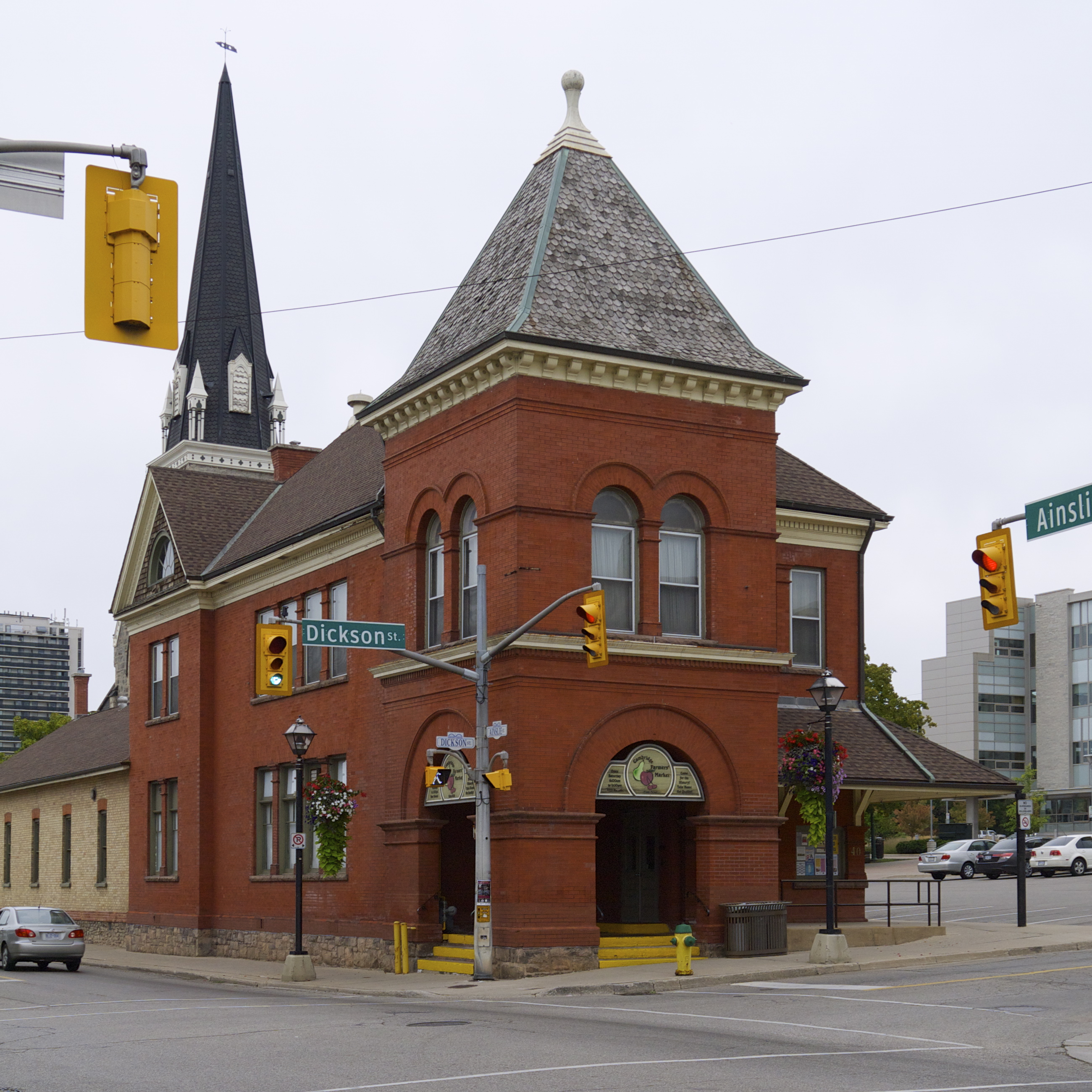
Cambridge Farmers Market

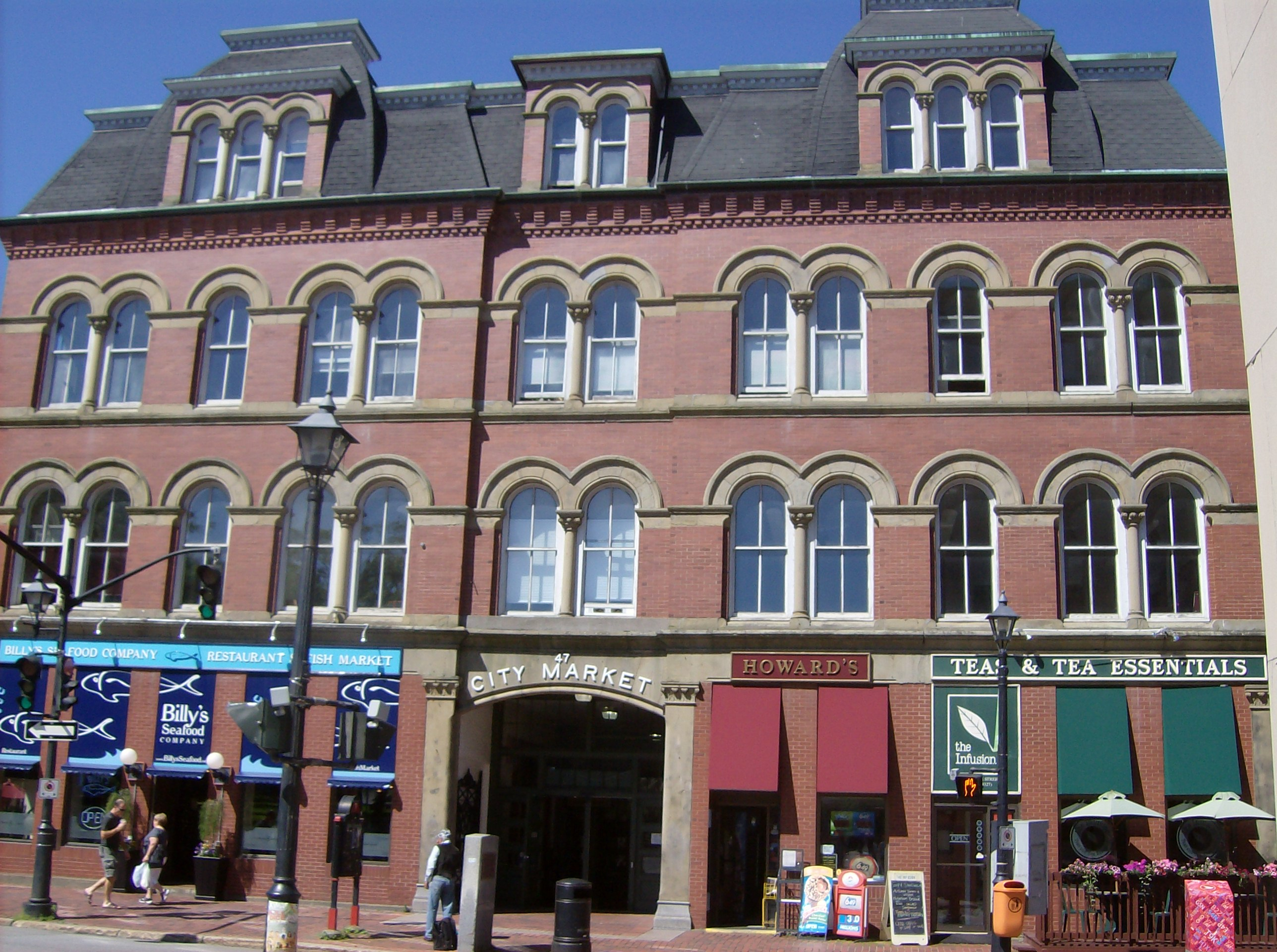
City Market, St Johns

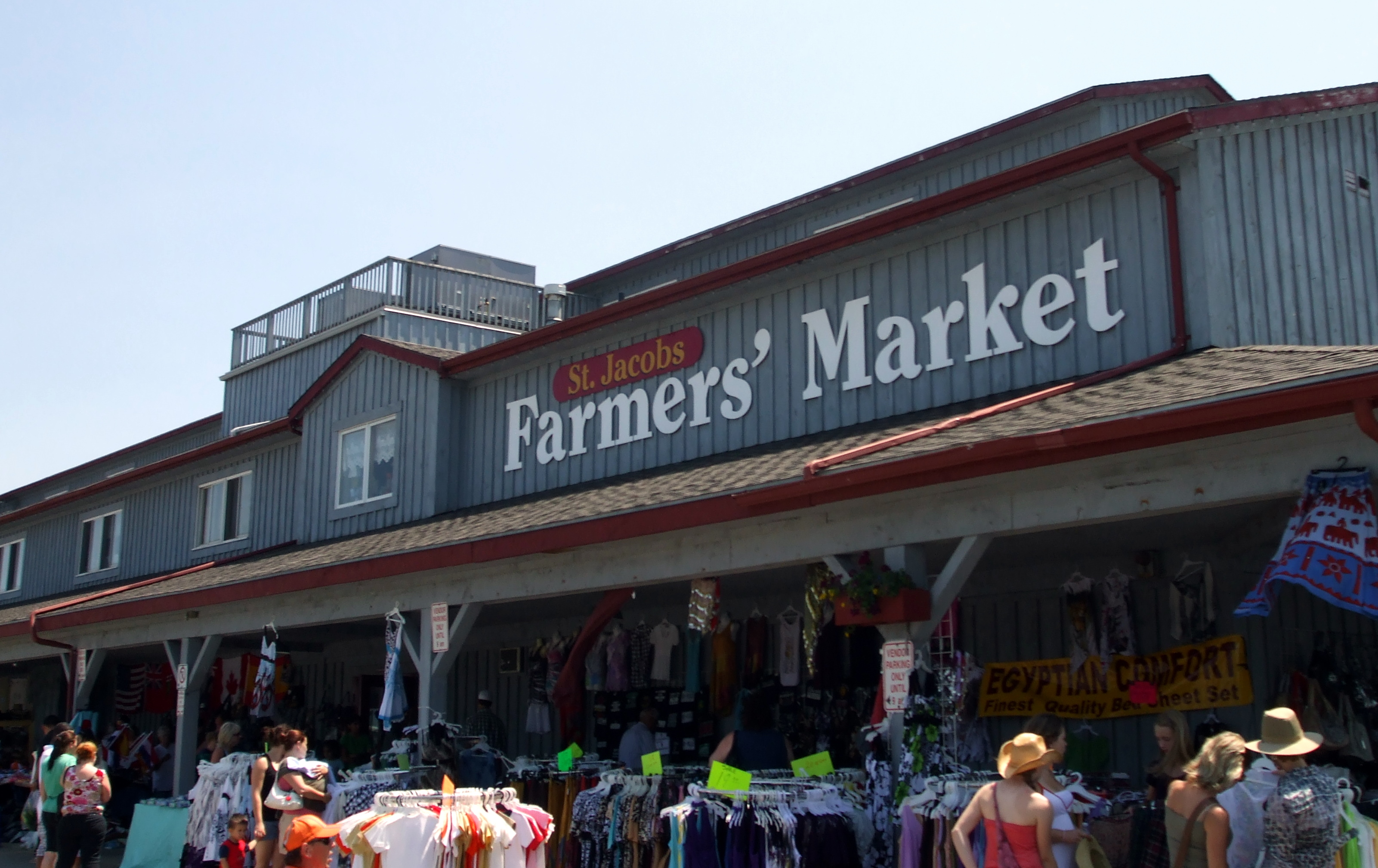
St. Jacobs Farmers Market

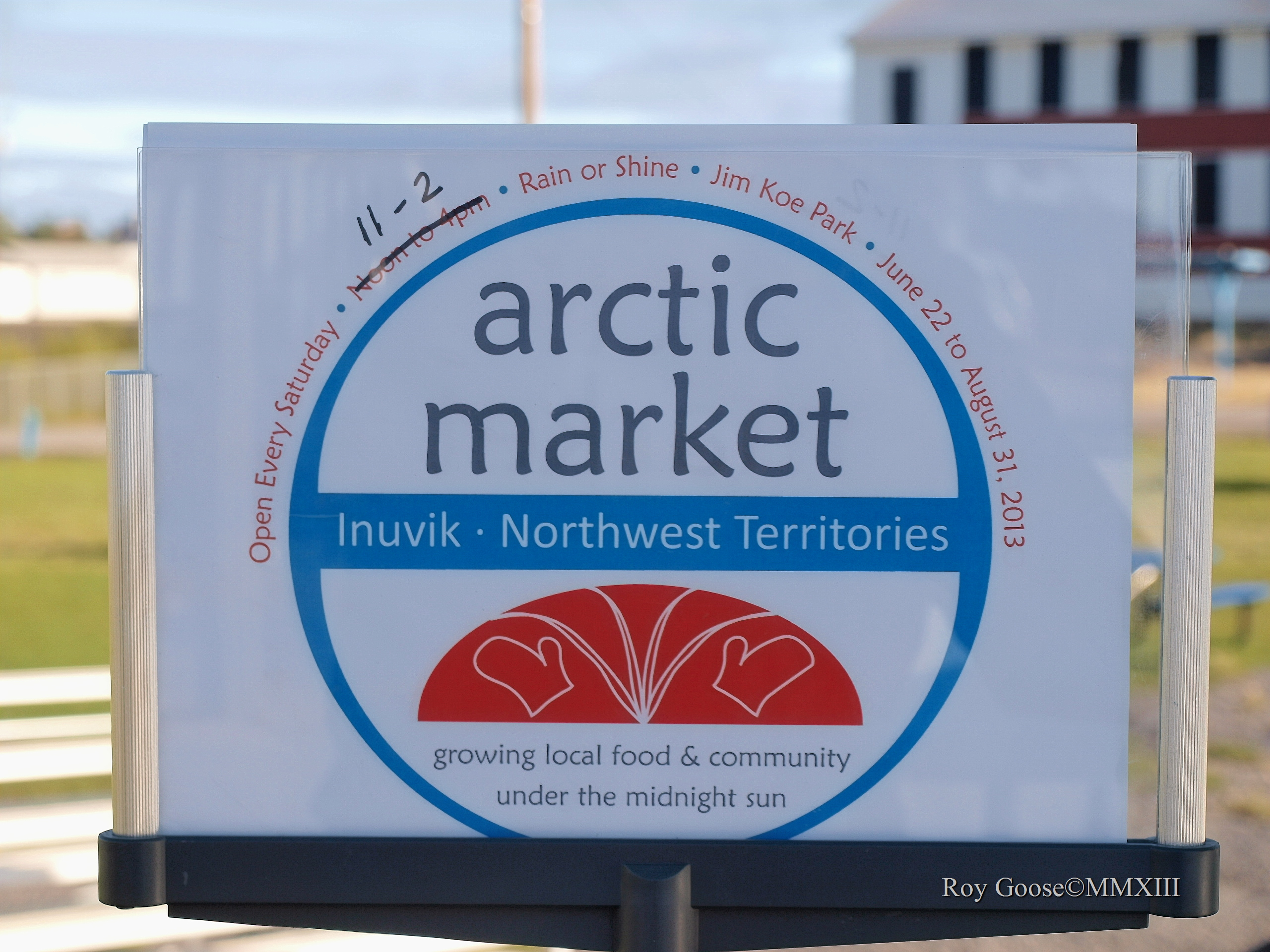
Arctic Market, Inuvik, Canada

==== Mexico ====
Since 2014, gourmet food halls have also sprung up in Mexico City, starting with Mercado Roma. Some traditional markets include:

- Mercado Jamaica, Mexico City, a traditional market in Mexico City
- Mercado de Sonora, a traditional market in Mexico City
- San Juan de Dios Market in Guadalajara
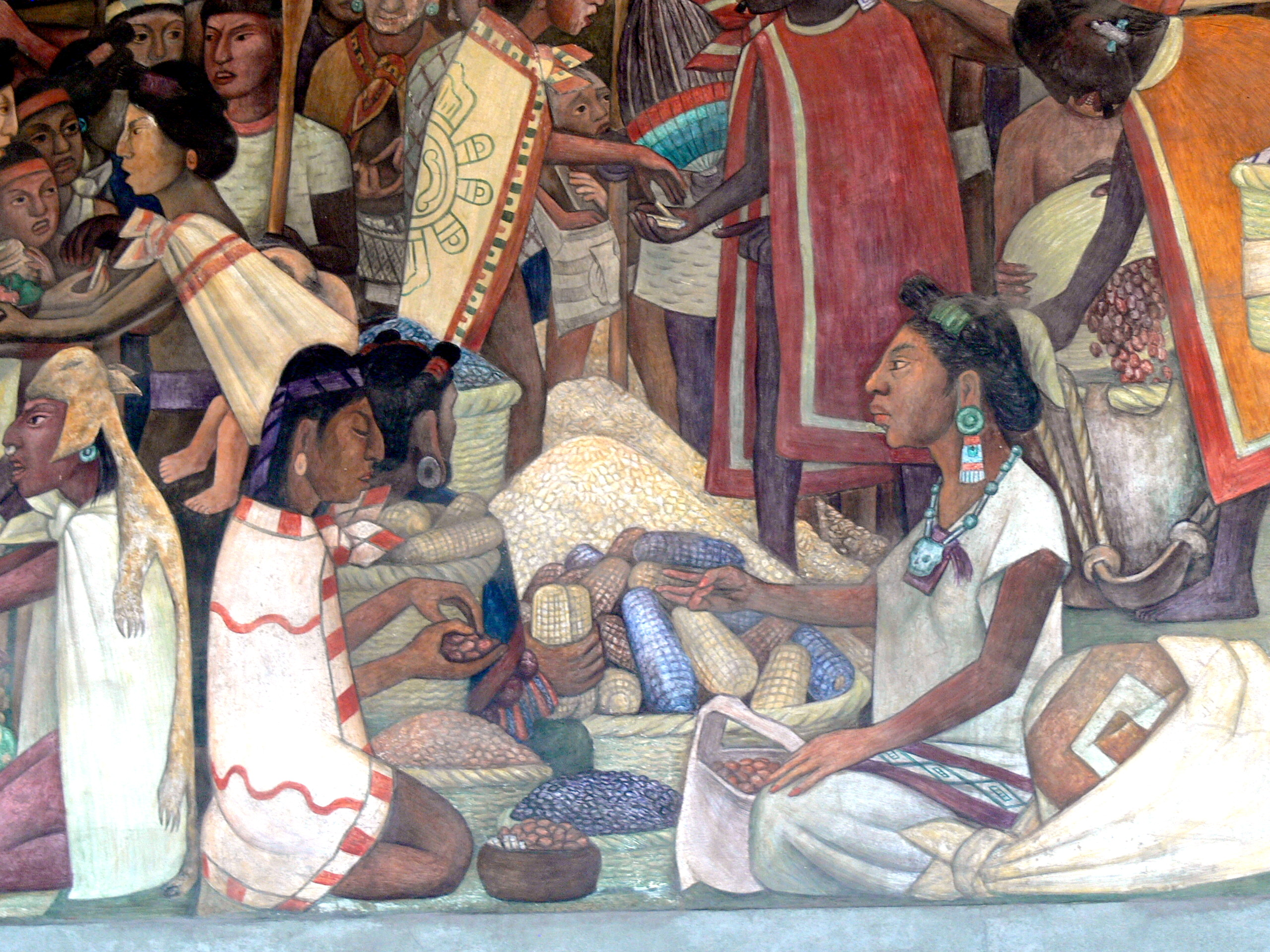
Market in Tlatelolco, mural by Diego Rivera

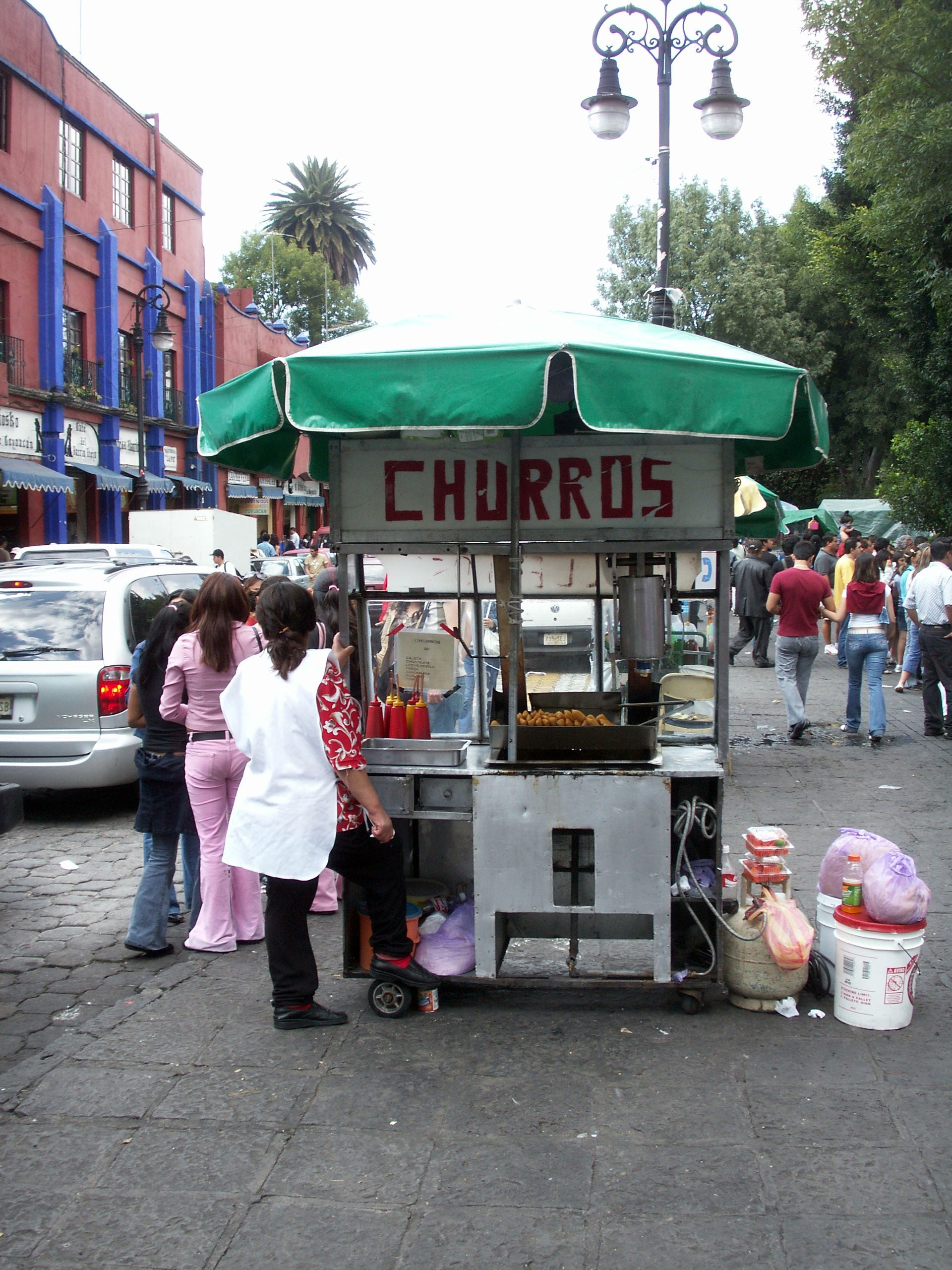
Churro Stands, like this one in Coyoacán, Mexico City, are a common sight in Latin-America.

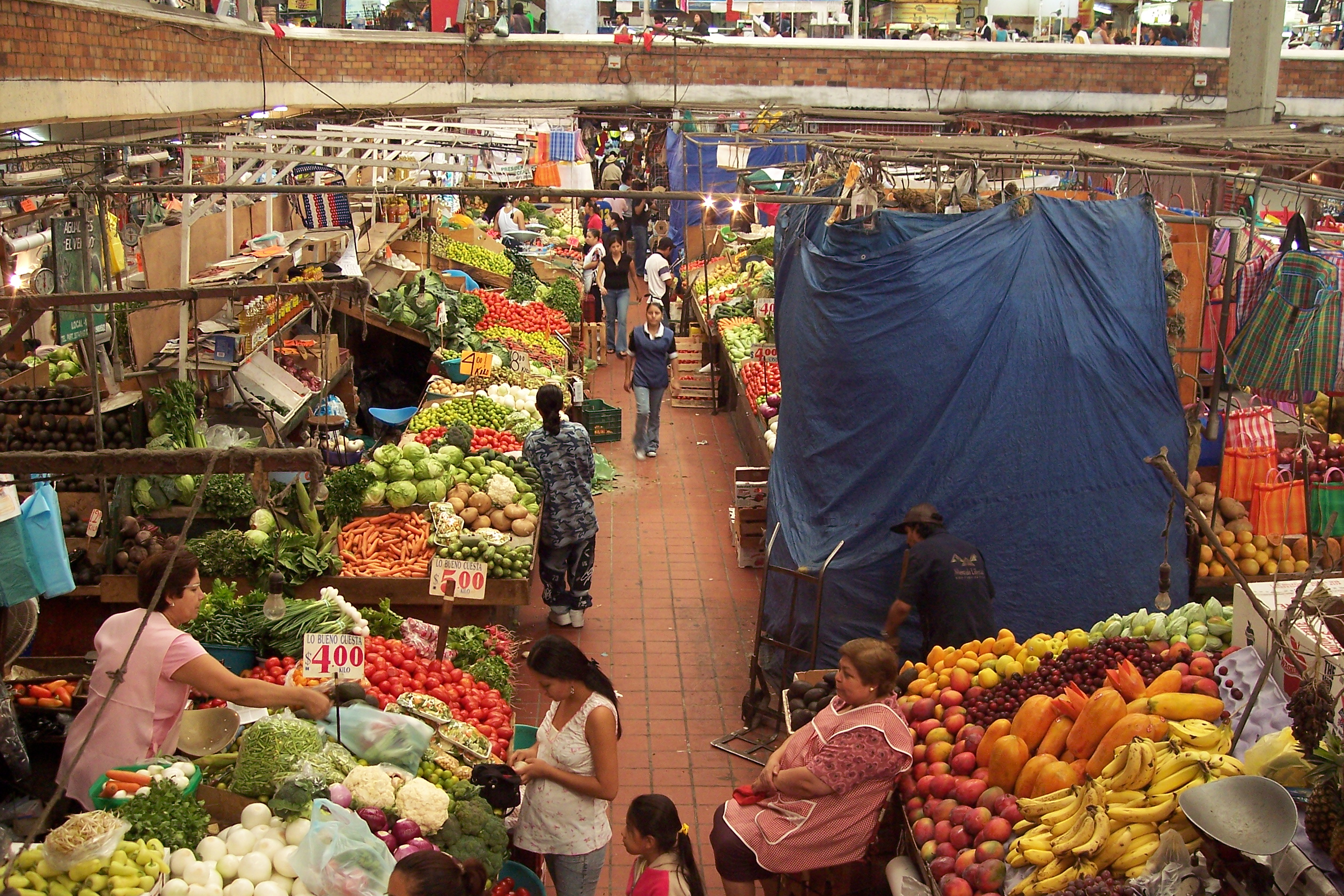
Grocery stalls in San Juan de Dios Market in Guadalajara, Mexico

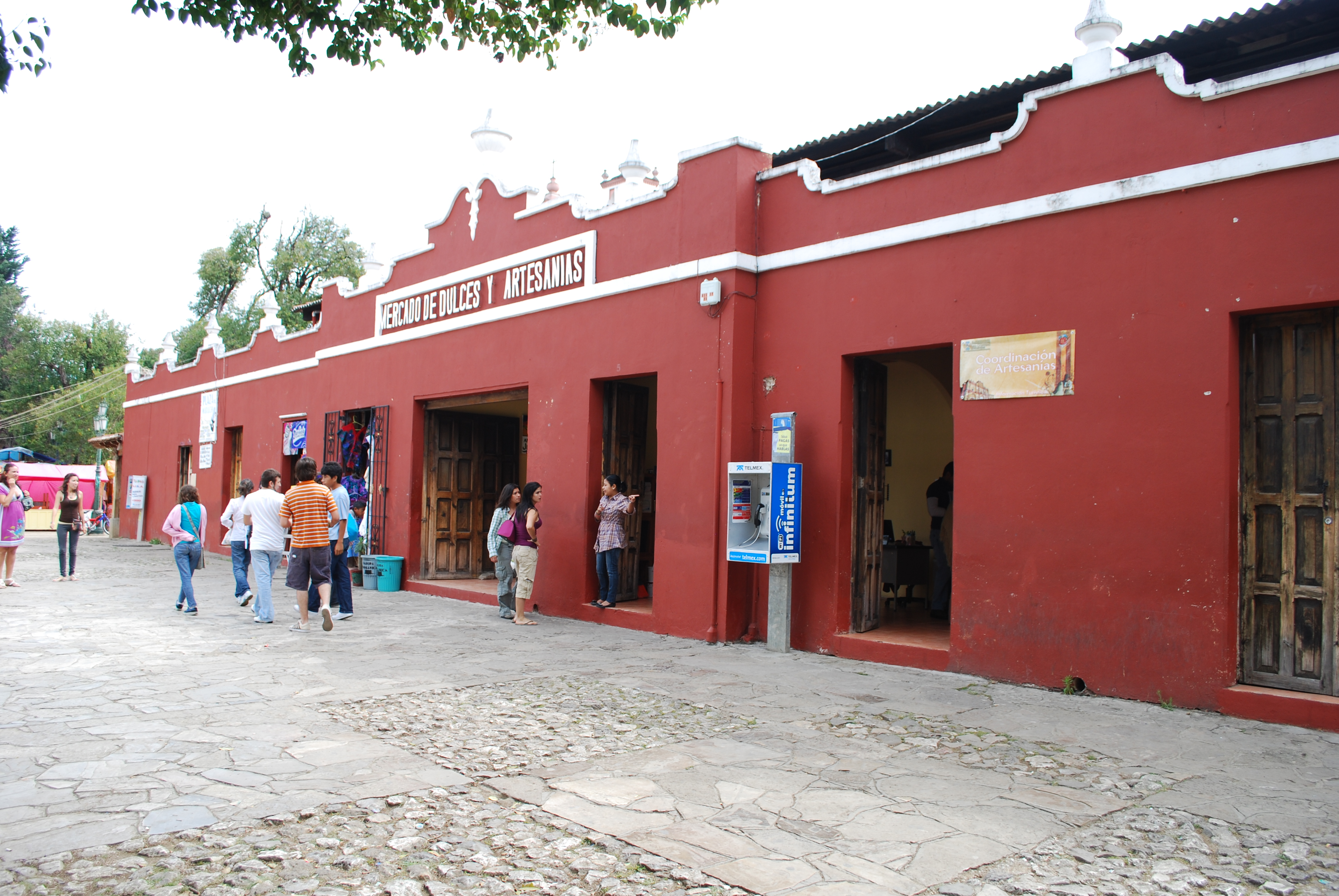
Artisans' Market, San Cristobal de las Casas, Chiapas, Mexico

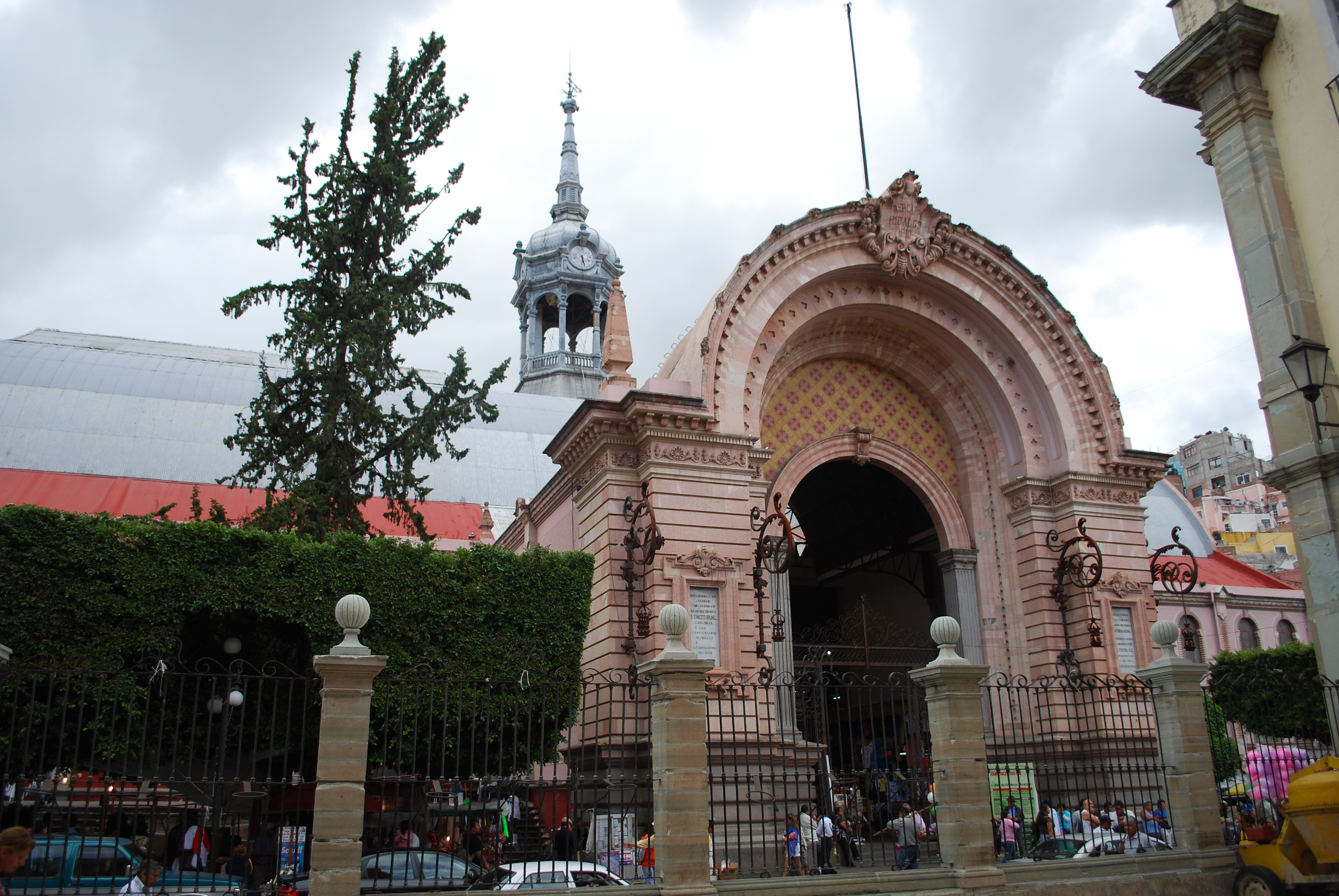
Entrance to Hidalgo Market, Guanajuato

==== Puerto Rico ====
- Mercado de las Carnes, a former meat market in Ponce, Puerto Rico

==== United States ====
In the United States, the term public market is often used for a place where vendors or merchants meet at the same location on a regular basis. A public market has a sponsoring entity that has legal and financial responsibility to oversee operations and, sometimes, provides facilities to house the market activity. Public markets may incorporate the traditional market activity – the sale of fresh food from open stalls – and may also offer a wide range of different products. Public markets may incorporate elements of specialized markets such as farmers markets, craft markets, and antique markets. Traditionally public markets in the US were owned and operated by city governments, but this is no longer the case.

According to the Ford Foundation, what distinguishes public markets from other types of related retail activity are three characteristics. Public markets:

1. have public goals, a defined civic purpose. Typically, these goals include: attracting shoppers to a central business district, providing affordable retailing opportunities to small businesses, preserving farming in the region, and activating or repurposing public space
2. are located in and/or create a public space in the community, where a wide range of people mix, and are, or aim to be, a heart of the community
3. are made up of locally owned, independent businesses operated by their owners, not franchises. This gives public markets a local flavor and unique experience.
The main entrance to Pike Place Market in Seattle, Washington

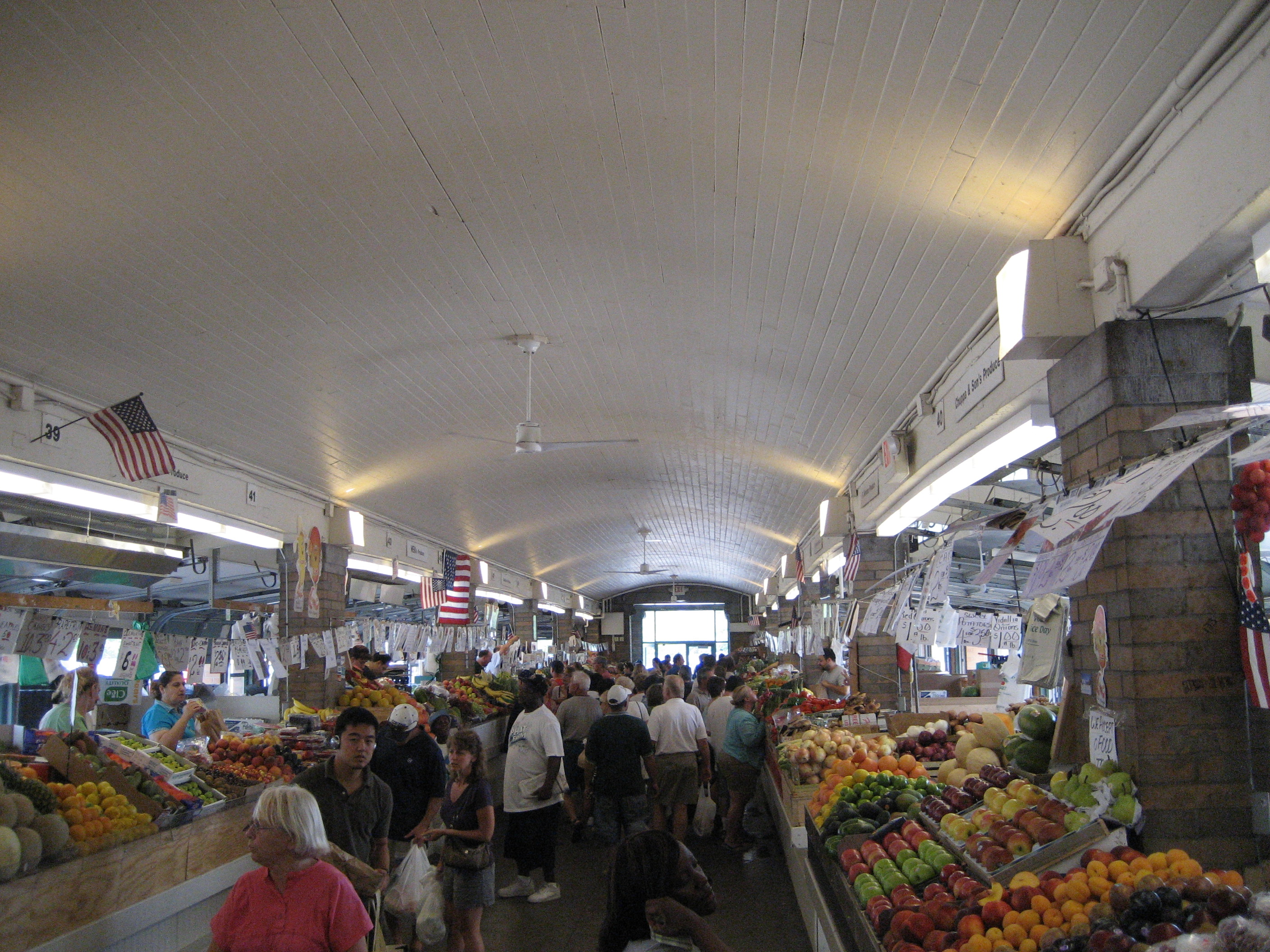
Corridor of fruit and vegetable sellers at the West Side Market in Cleveland, Ohio

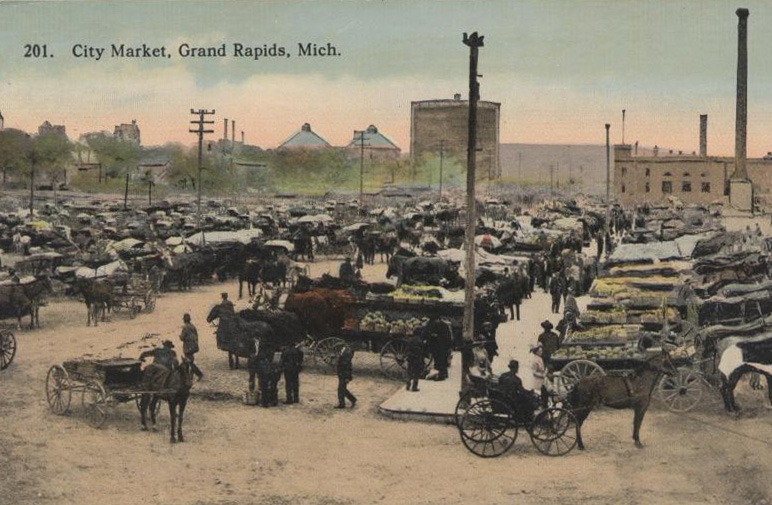
Postcard showing city market in Grand Rapids, Michigan, about 1910

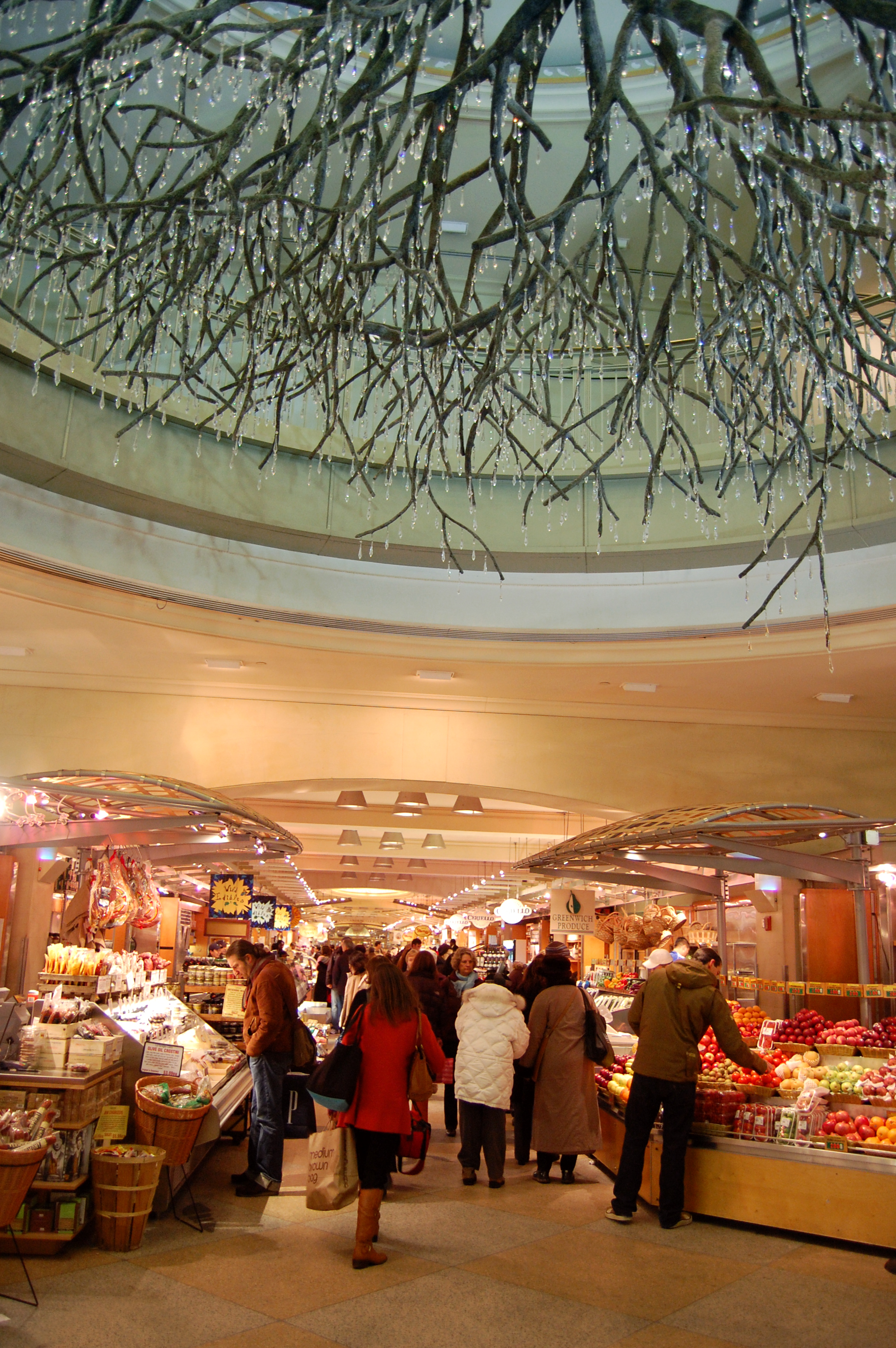
Grand Central Market, New York

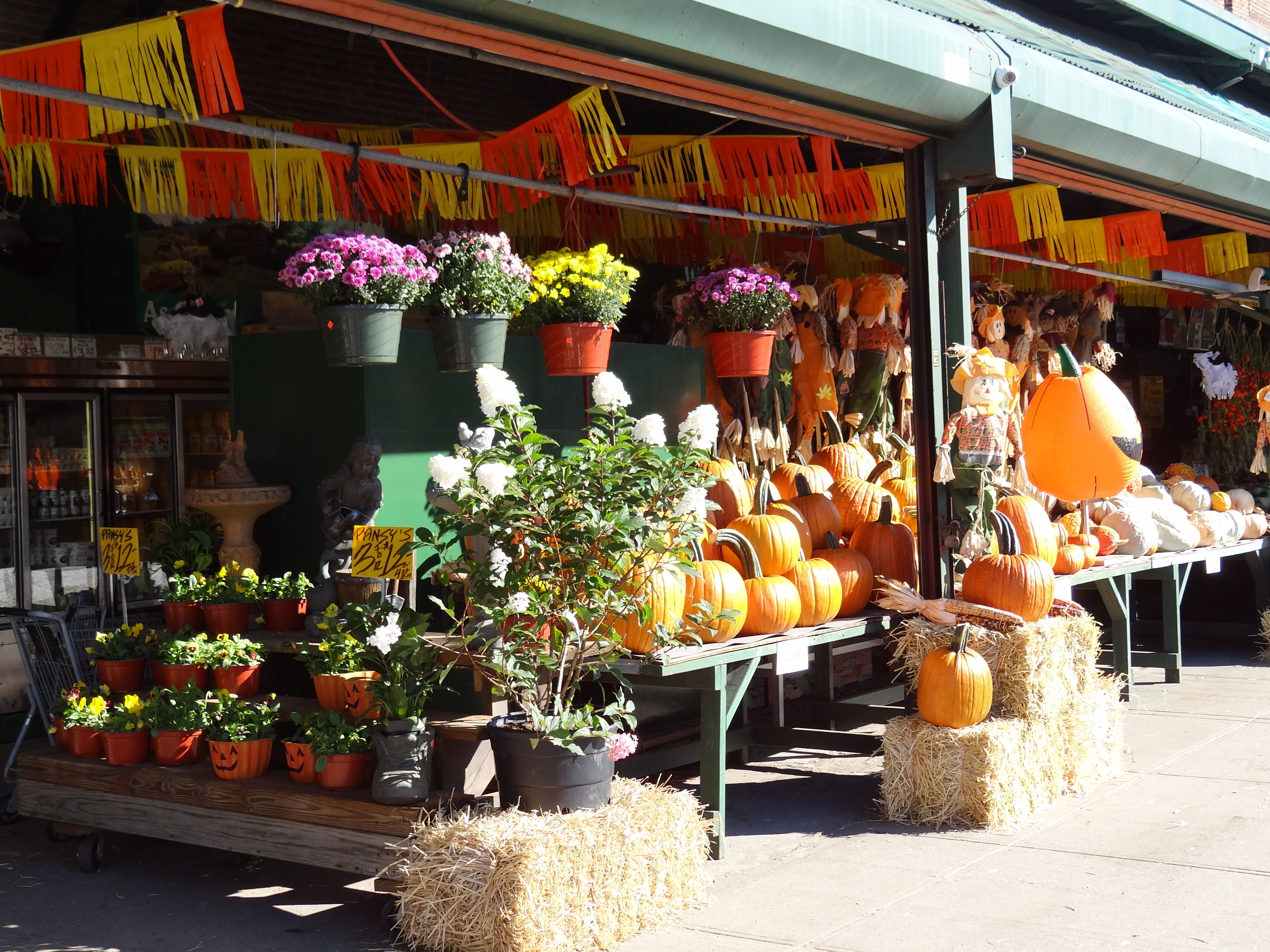
Gerardi's Farmer Market, New York

===== List of public markets =====
- Alemany Farmers' Market – San Francisco, California
- Boston Public Market – Boston, Massachusetts
- Broad Street Market – Harrisburg, Pennsylvania
- Brooklyn Flea – Brooklyn, New York
- Chattanooga Market (2001–present) – Chattanooga, Tennessee
- Chicago farmers' markets Chicago, Illinois
- City Market (Charleston, South Carolina)
- City Market (Petersburg, Virginia) – Petersburg, Virginia. Built in 1878–79 and listed on the National Register of Historic Places
- City Market (Savannah, Georgia)
- Crescent City Farmers Market – New Orleans, Louisiana
- Cross Street Market – Baltimore, Maryland
- Dallas Farmers Market – Dallas, Texas
- Dane County Farmers' Market – Madison, Wisconsin
- Dayton Arcade – Dayton, Ohio
- Eastern Market – Detroit, Michigan
- Eastern Market – Washington, D.C.
- Ferry Plaza Farmers Market & Ferry Building Marketplace – San Francisco, California
- Findlay Market (1855–present) – Cincinnati, Ohio
- French Market – New Orleans, Louisiana
- Fulton Fish Market New York, New York
- Grand Central Market – Los Angeles, California
- Grand Central Market – New York, New York
- Haymarket – Boston, Massachusetts
- Hollins Market – Baltimore, Maryland
- Indianapolis City Market (1821–present) – Indianapolis, Indiana
- Italian Market, Philadelphia – Philadelphia, Pennsylvania
- James Beard Public Market (future) – Portland, Oregon
- La Marqueta – New York, New York
- Lancaster Central Market – Lancaster, Pennsylvania
- Lexington Market (1782–present) – Baltimore, Maryland
- Los Angeles Farmers Market – Los Angeles, California
- Maxwell Street Market – Chicago, Illinois
- Midtown Global Market – Minneapolis, Minnesota
- Milwaukee Public Market (2005–present) – Milwaukee, Wisconsin
- North Market – Columbus, Ohio
- Olvera Street – Los Angeles, California
- Pike Place Market (1907–present) – Seattle, Washington
- Ponce City Market – Atlanta, Georgia
- Portland Public Market (1933–1942) – Portland, Oregon
- Portland Saturday Market (1974–present) – Portland, Oregon
- Reading Terminal Market (1893–present) – Philadelphia, Pennsylvania
- River Market (formerly known as Westport Landing, the City Market, and River Quay) - Kansas City, Missouri
- PNC Second Street Market – Dayton, Ohio
- Soulard Market – St. Louis, Missouri
- Sweet Auburn Curb Market (1918–present) – Atlanta, Georgia
- Union Market – Washington, D.C.
- Union Square Greenmarket – New York, New York
- West Side Market – Cleveland, Ohio

===== Lists of markets =====
- List of Farmers Markets in Indiana

=== Oceania ===
==== Australia ====
===== Melbourne =====
The Queen Victoria Market is the city of Melbourne's central market. Opened in 1878, it is the largest open air market in the southern hemisphere and its largely intact original buildings offer visitors the opportunity to shop among 19th century retail rows and experience a vibrant, working market place. The Queen Victoria Market site has been listed as an historic place by Heritage Victoria and a number of its buildings are listed as notable buildings on the Historic Building Register of Victoria. The site is currently undergoing a site renewal project. It is a Melbourne landmark, popular with both locals and visitors.

Major suburban markets include the Prahran Market, South Melbourne market and the Footscray Market. Periodic farmers' markets are also very popular in Melbourne.

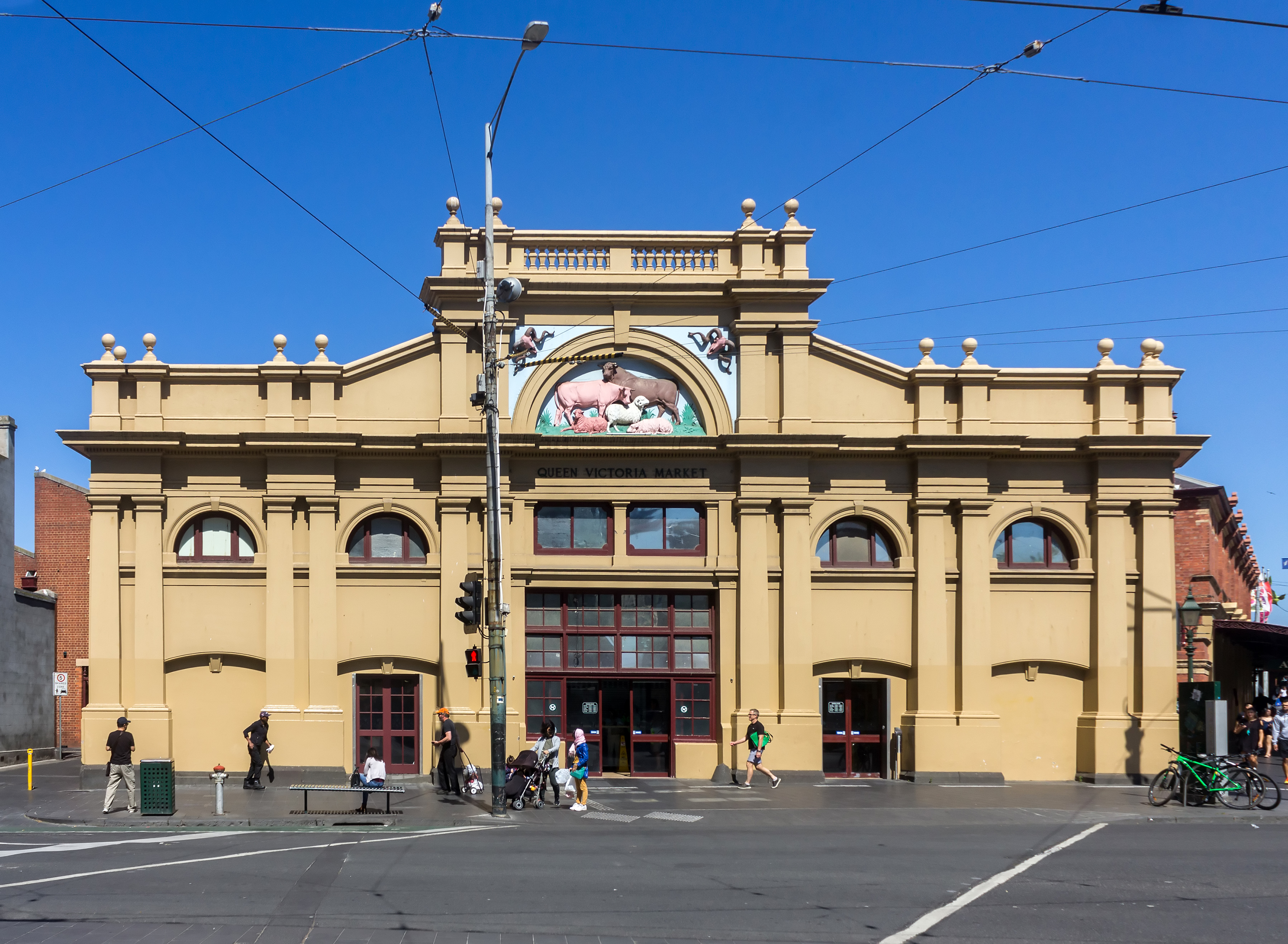
Queen Victoria Market, entrance to the Meat and Fish Hall

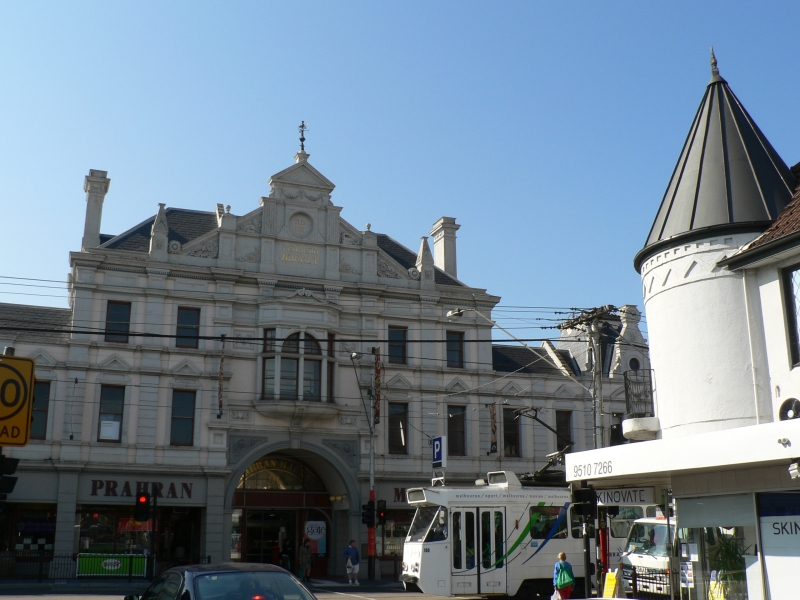
Prahran Market, South Yarra

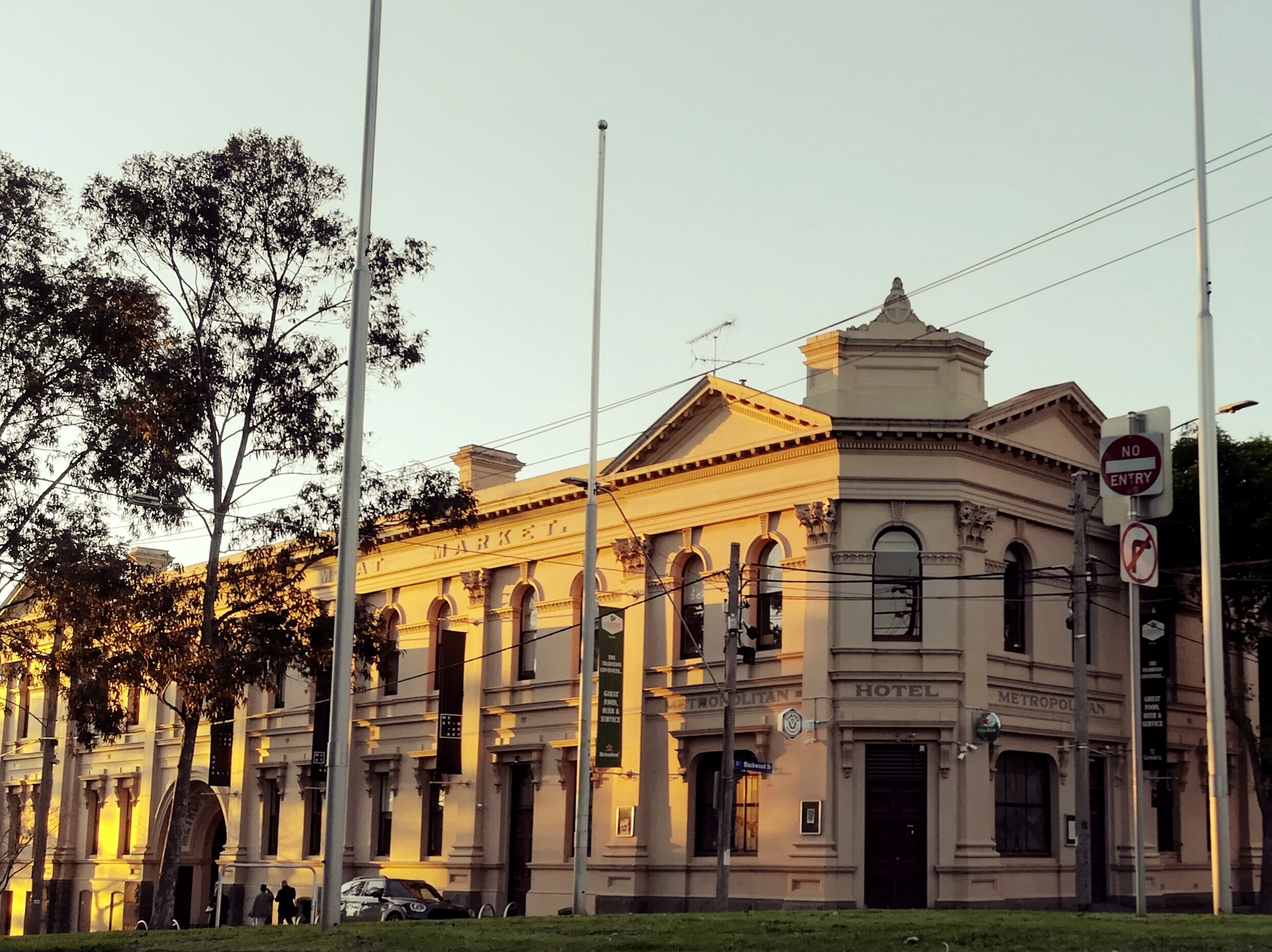
Metropolitan Meat Market, North Melbourne

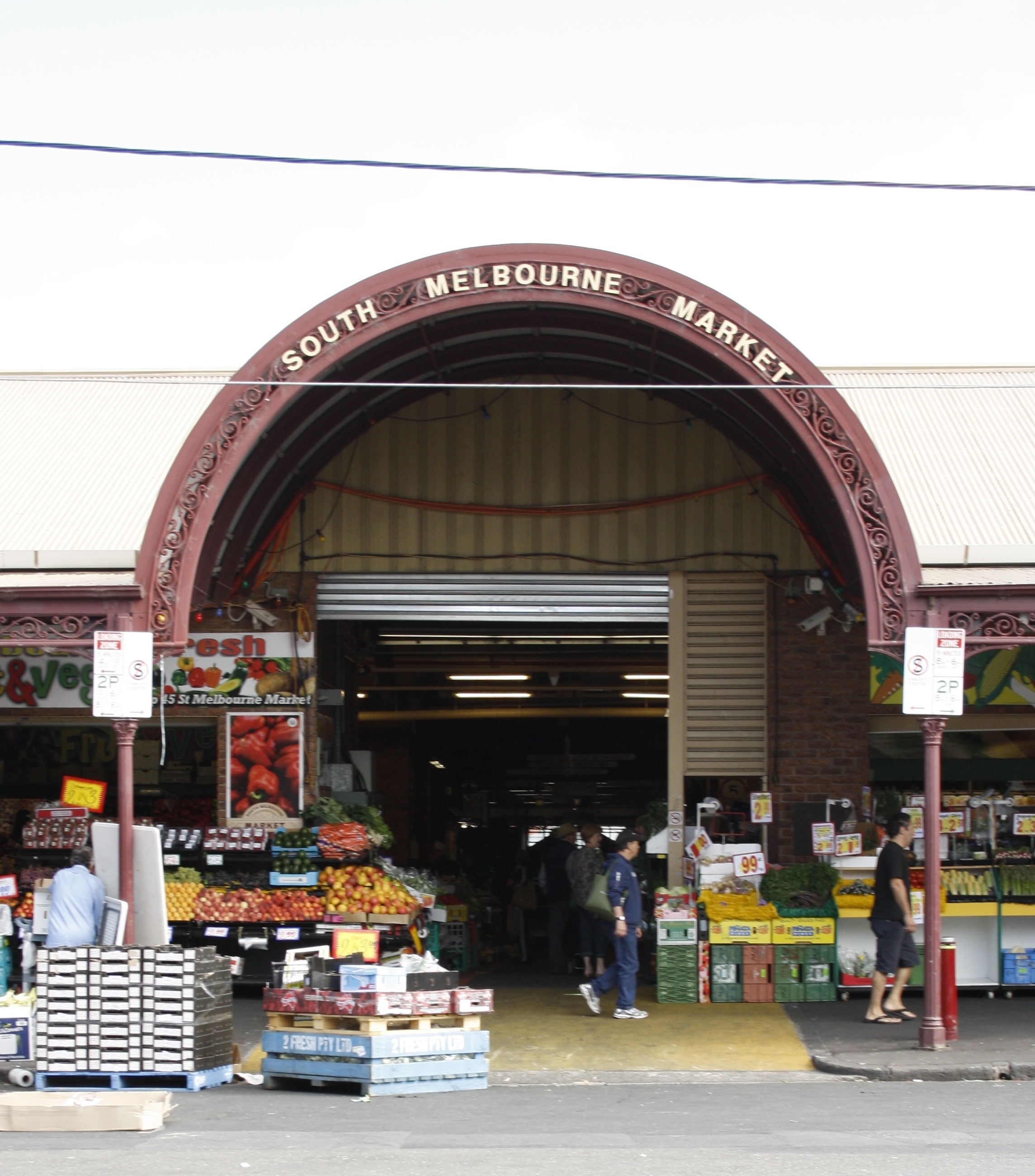
South Melbourne market (exterior)

===== Sydney =====
Sydney boasts a number of popular markets. The Rocks market, situated in the Rocks district, near the Sydney Opera House, focuses on crafts, jewellery, and leather goods and operates at weekends. Paddy's Market, near Chinatown, is the produce market and operates Wednesday through to Sunday. Haymarket is one of the main produce markets and is located in Flemington. The Sydney Fish Market, in Pyrmont opens from 7:00 am on Wednesday through to Saturday. Paddington Markets on Oxford Street sells a range of goods from fresh produce through to clothing.

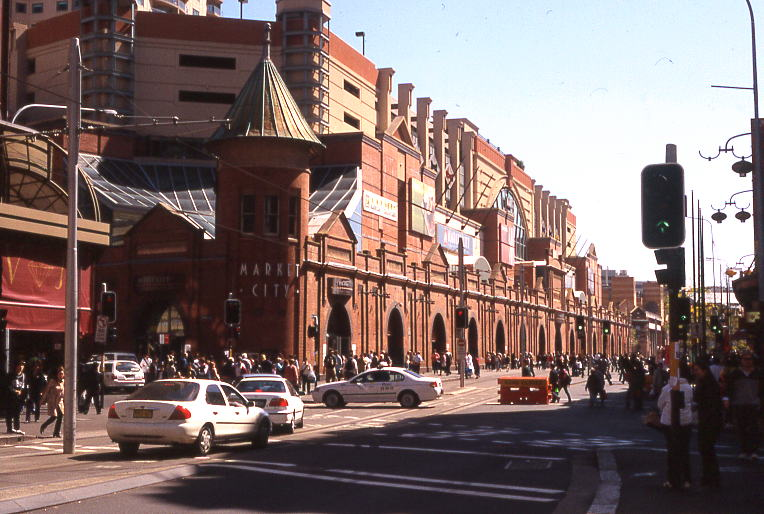
Haymarket fresh produce market, Hay Street, Sydney, NSW

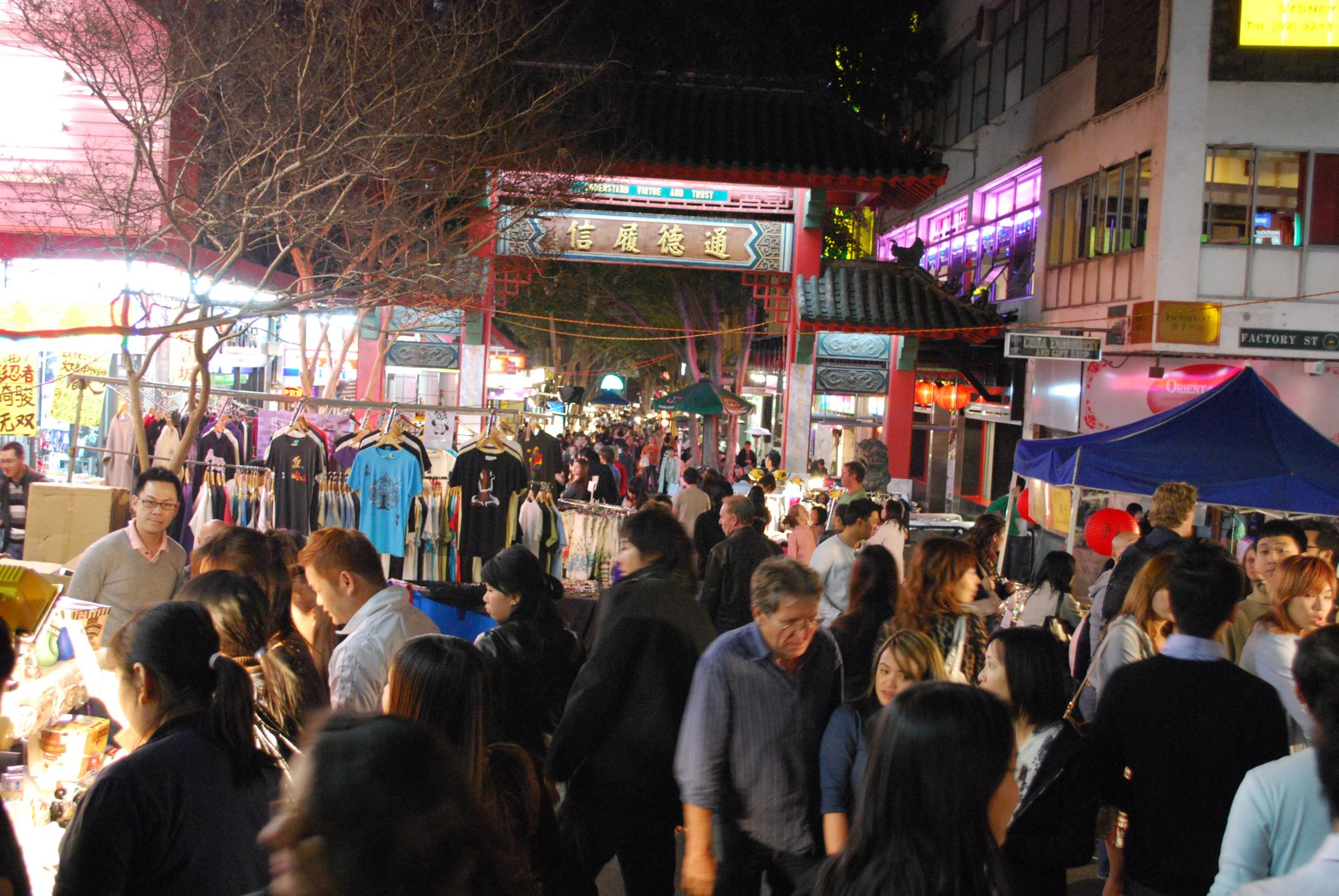
Chinatown Night Market, Sydney, NSW

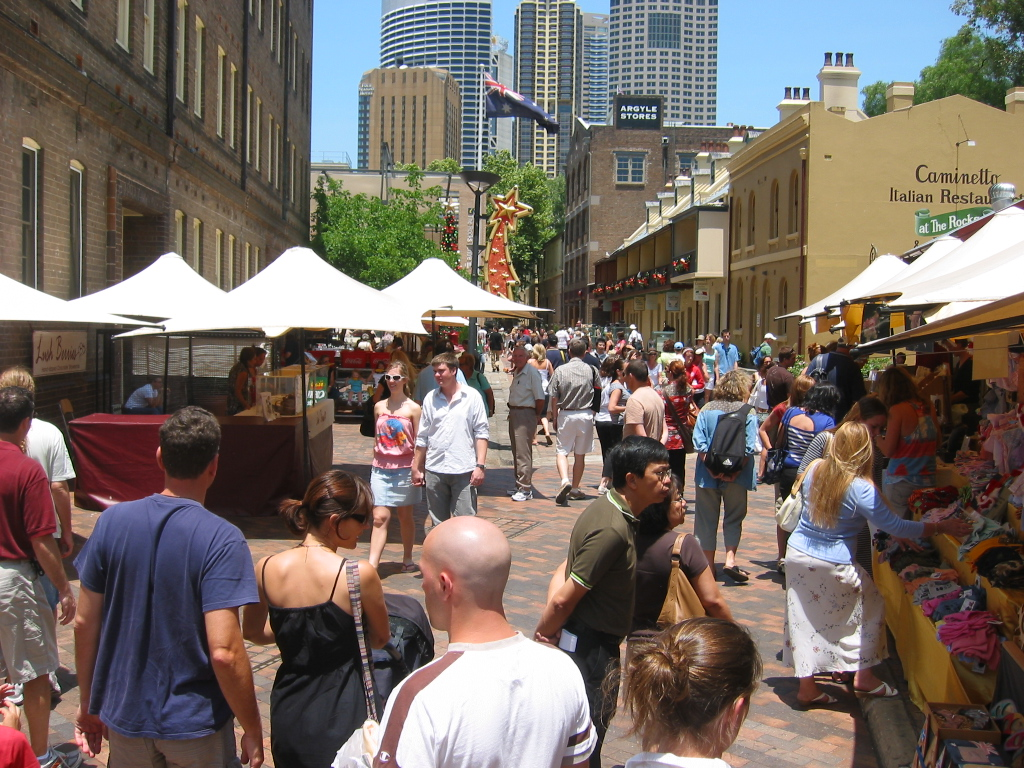
Rocks Market in 2007

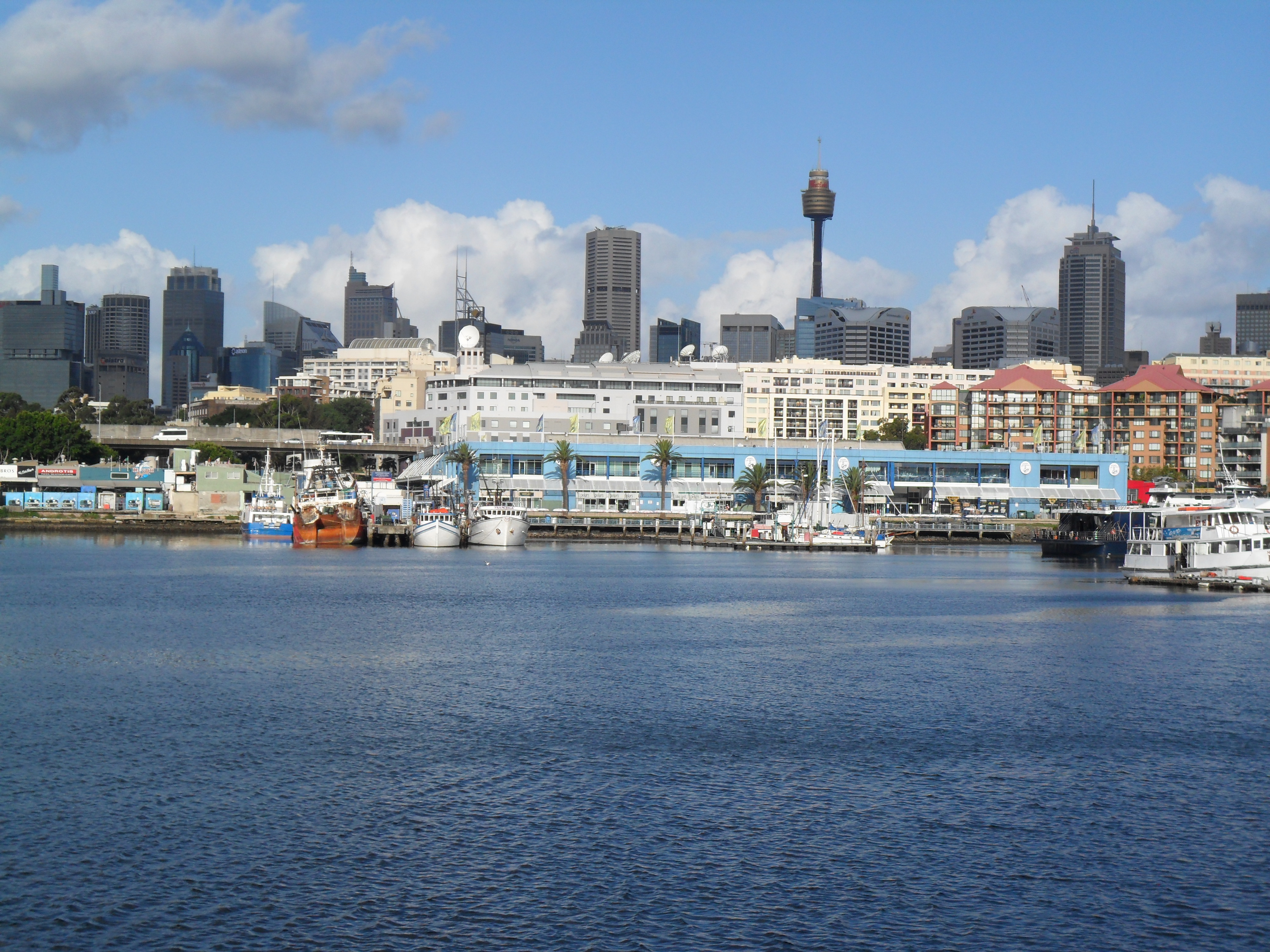
Sydney Fish Market view from Glebe, NSW

===== Perth =====
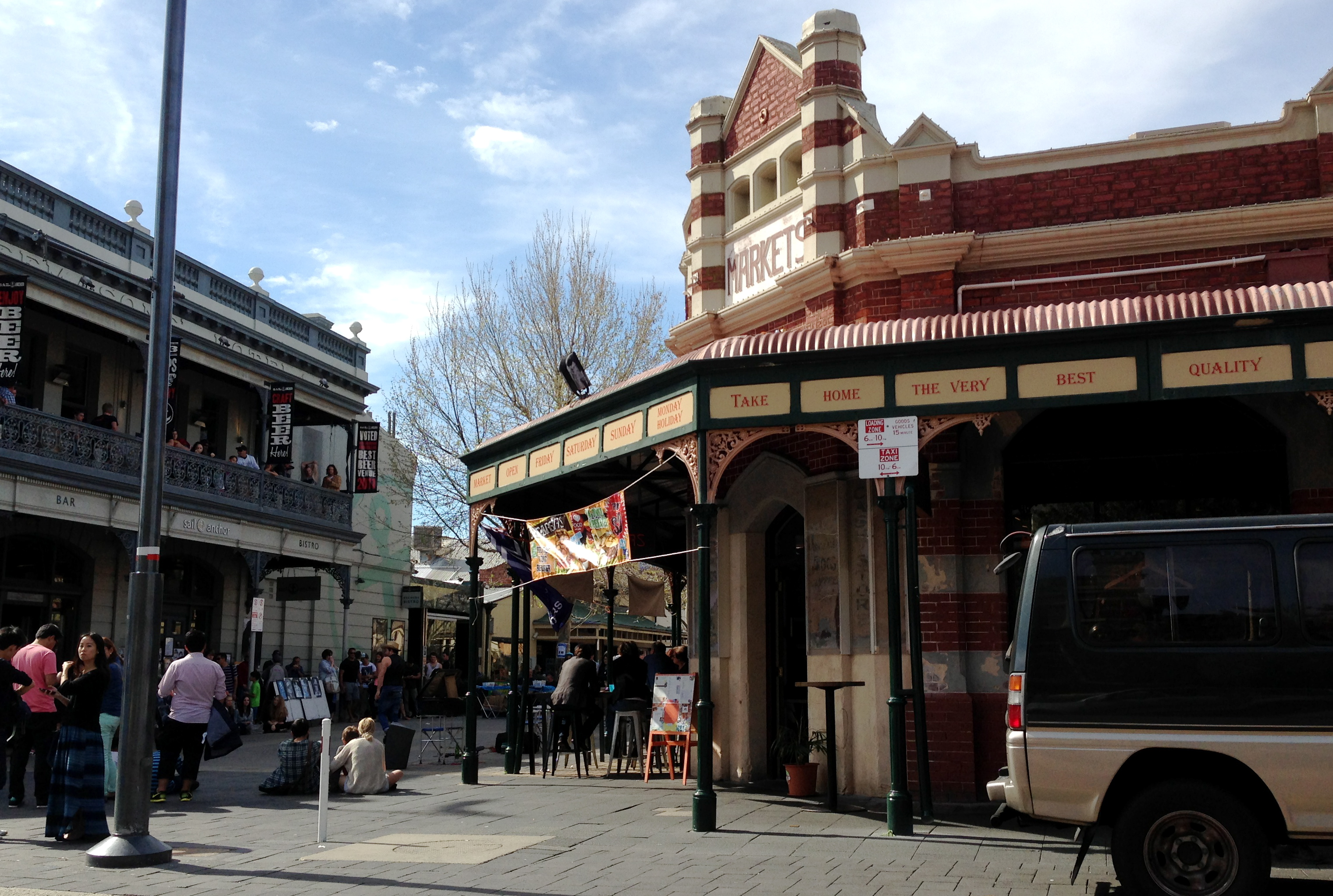
Fremantle Markets, northwest corner, Perth, Western Australia

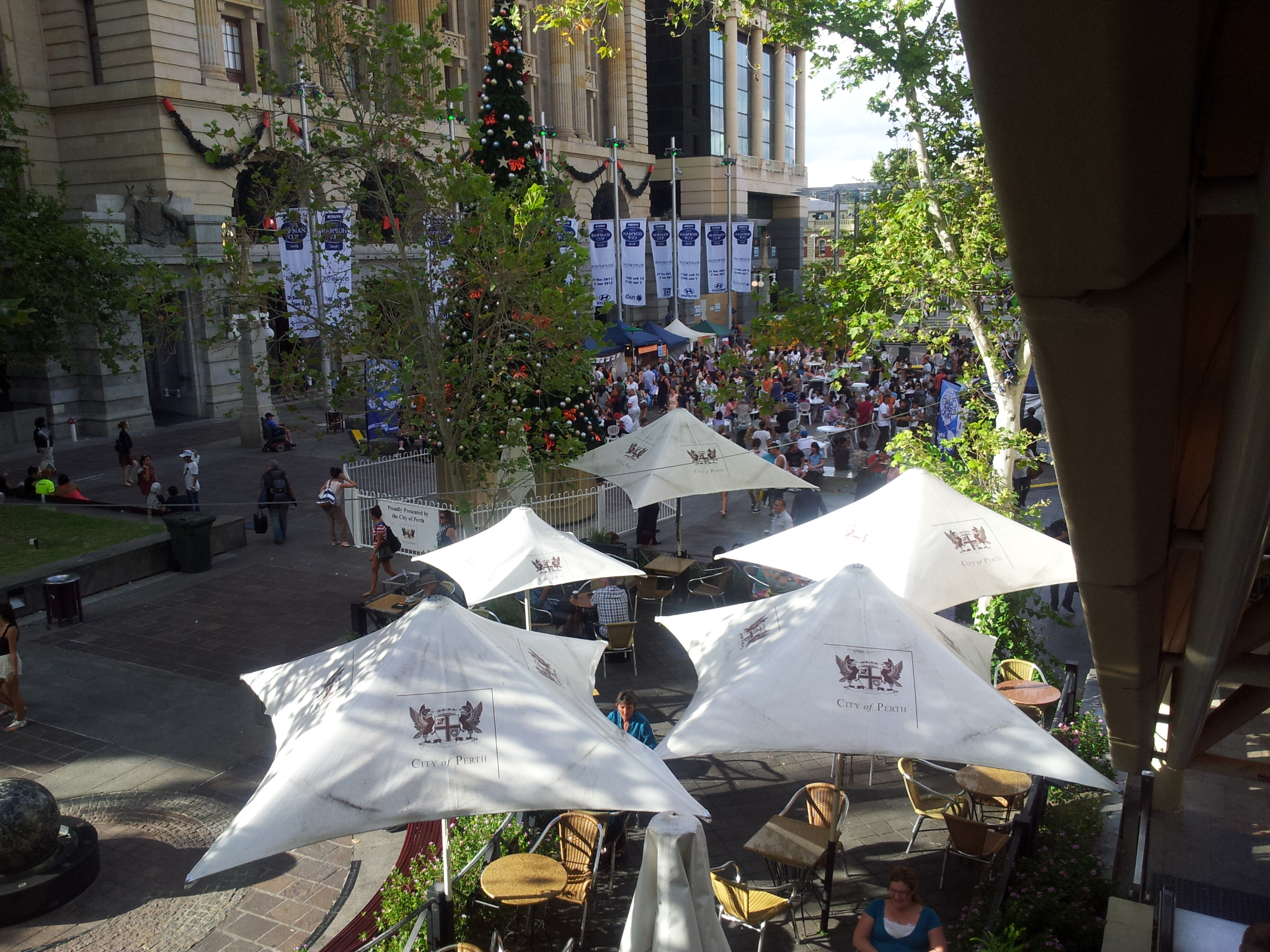
Perth night market, 2012

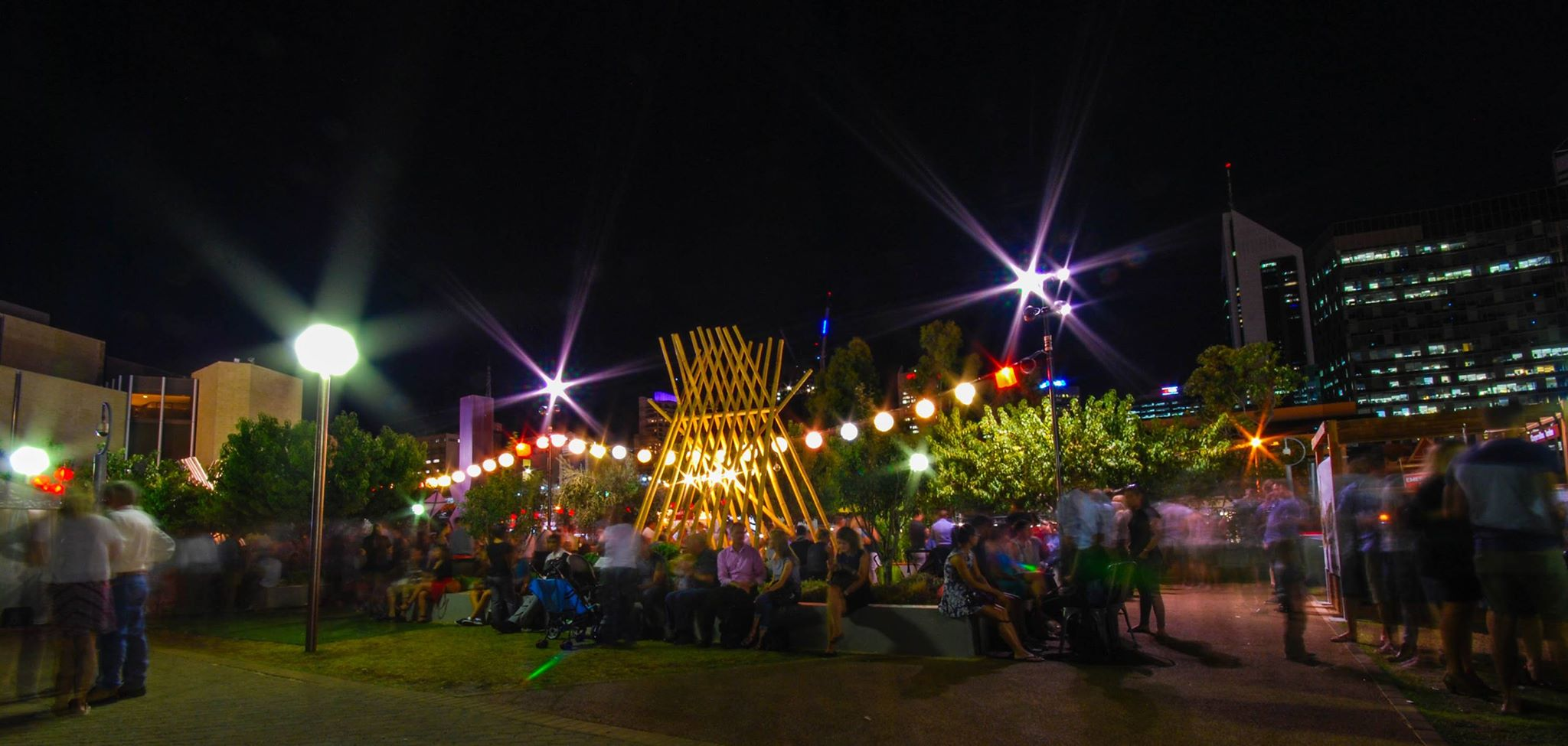
Perth Night Noodle Markets

===== Adelaide =====
- Adelaide Central Market
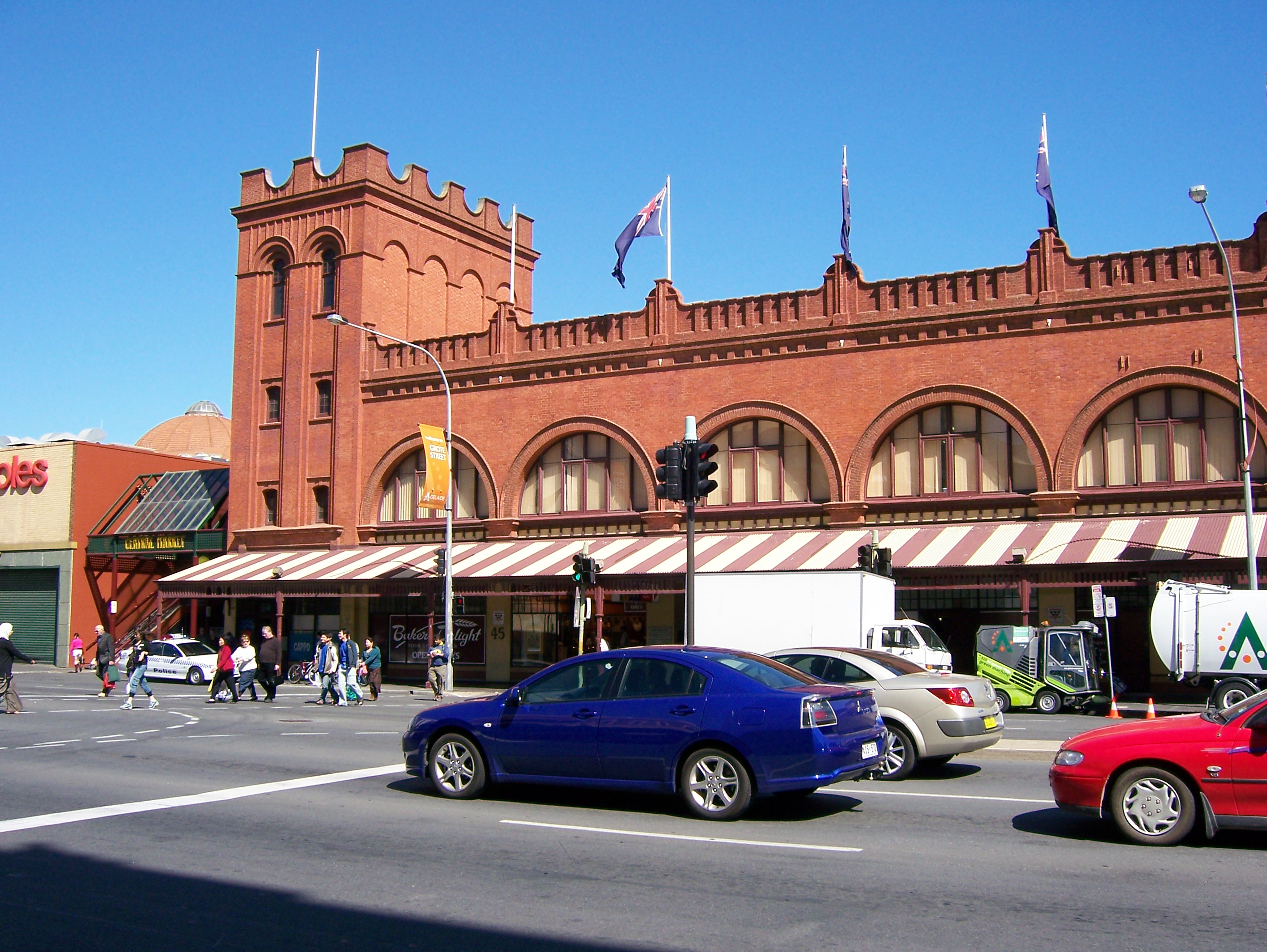
Adelaide Central Market, 2006

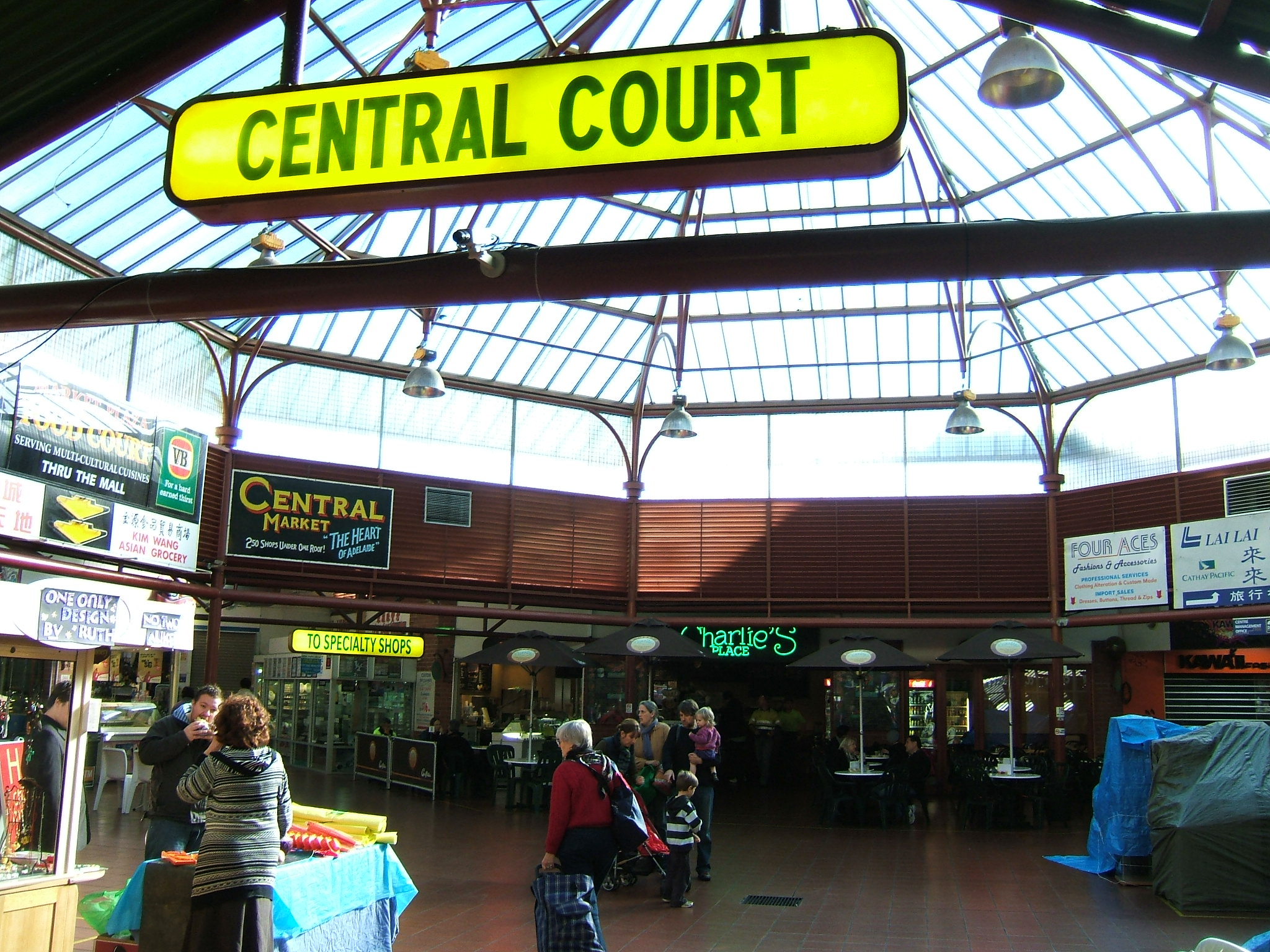
Central Court, Adelaide Central Market

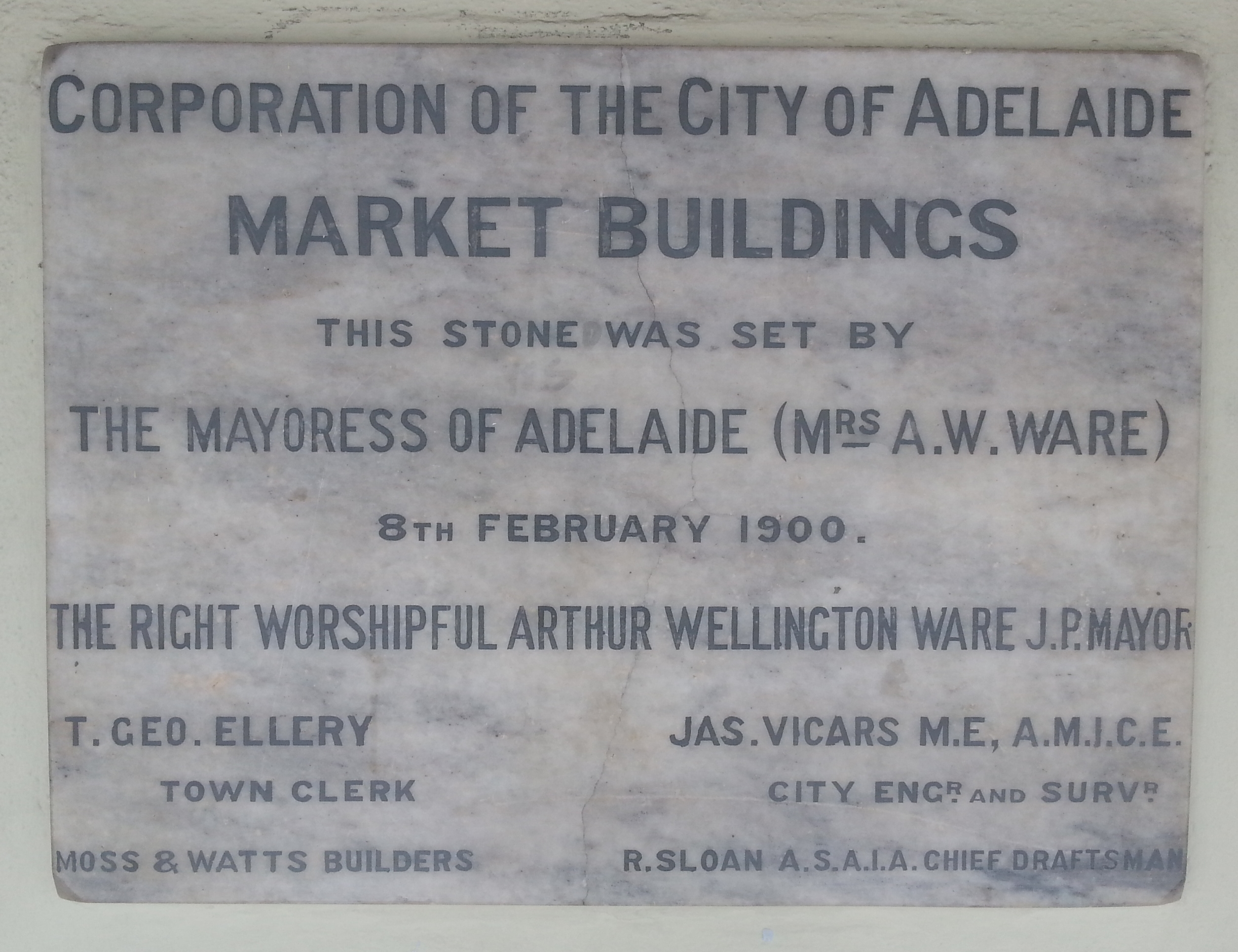
Adelaide Central Market Buildings Foundation Stone

===== Hobart =====
- Salamanca Market
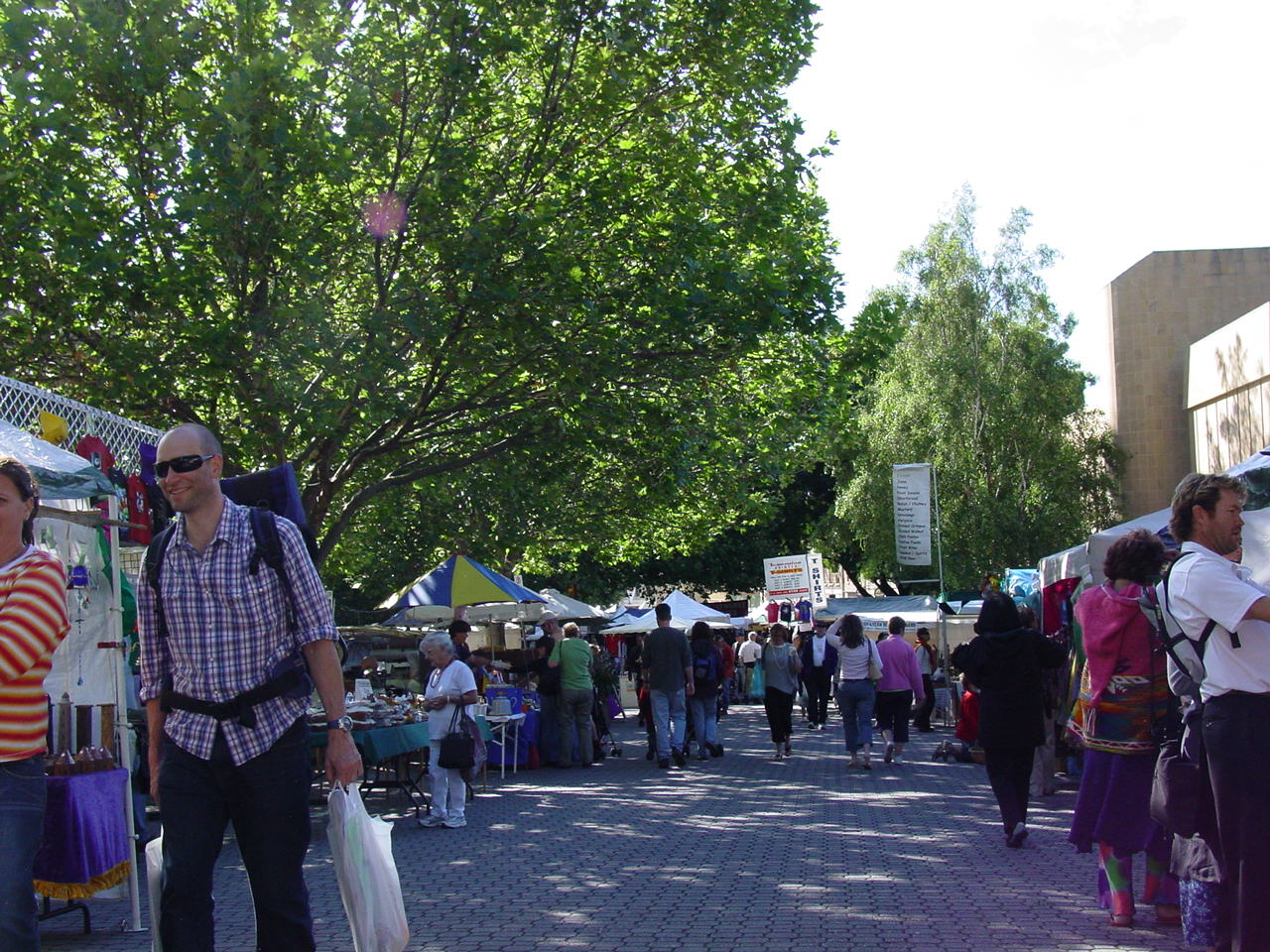
Salamanca Place Market, Hobart, Tasmania

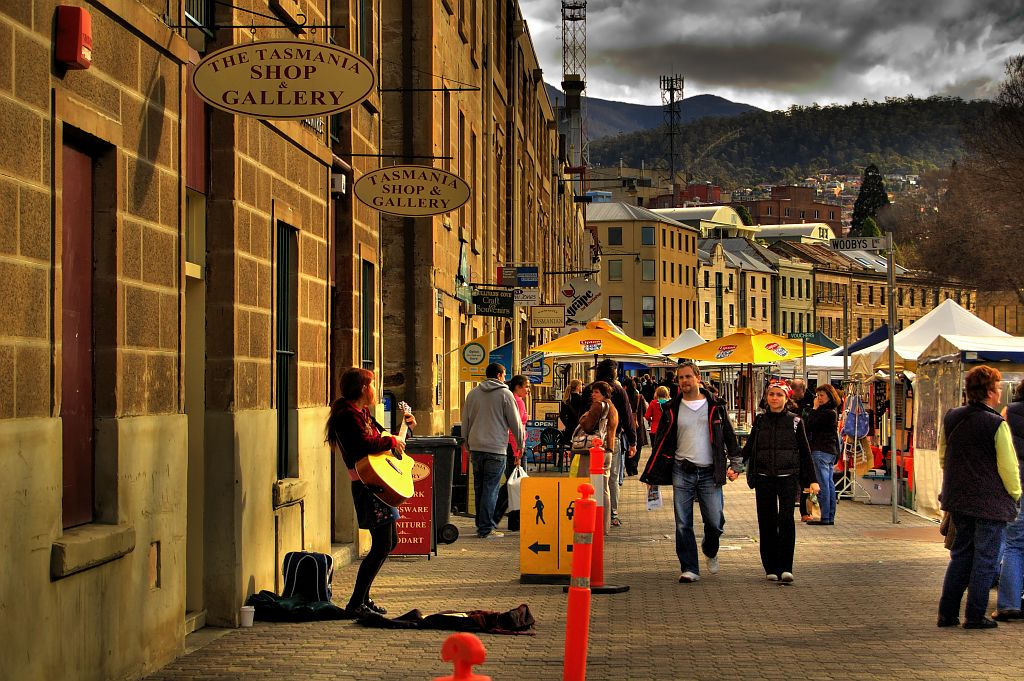
Salamanca Market Hobart Tasmania

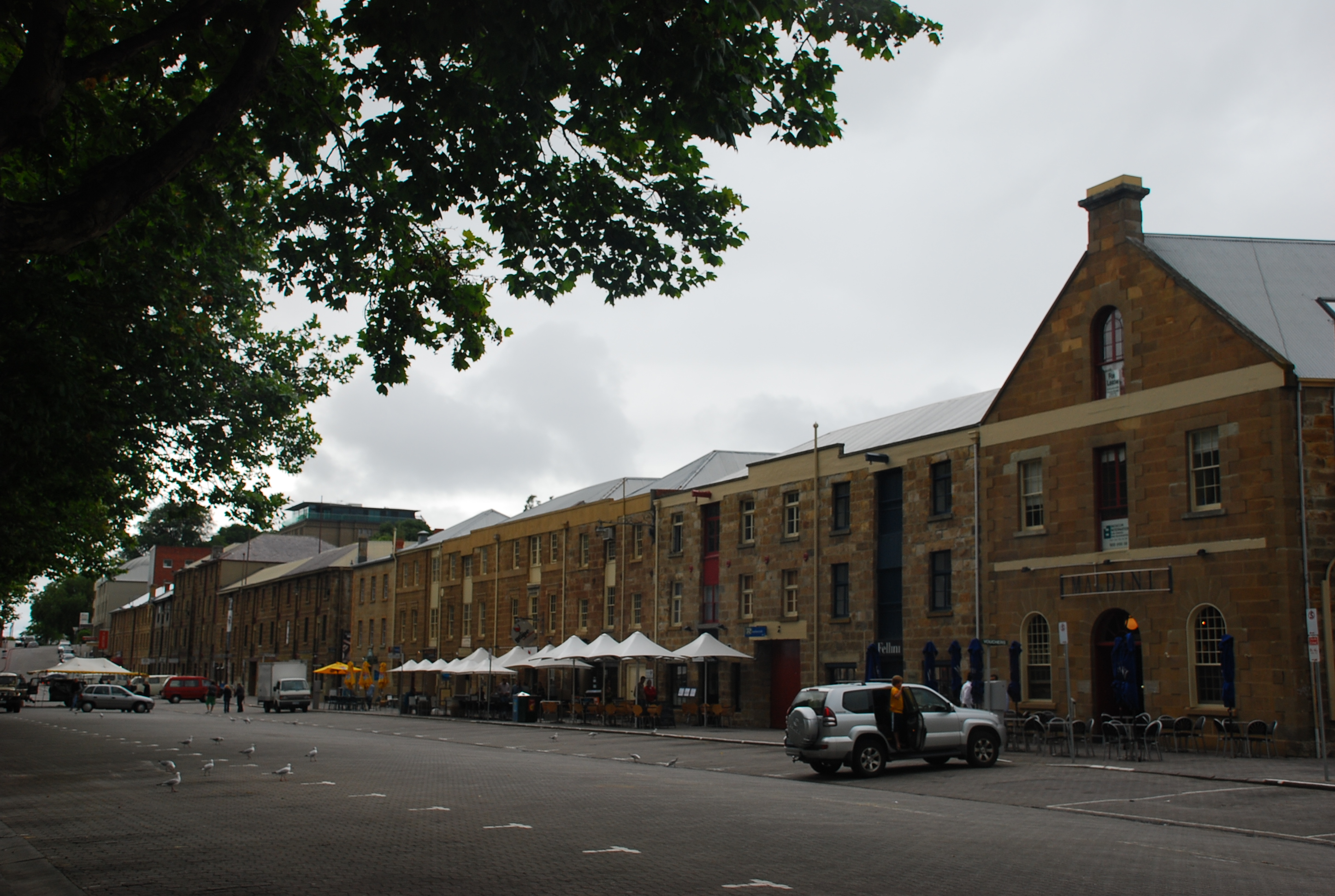
Salamanca market in Hobart

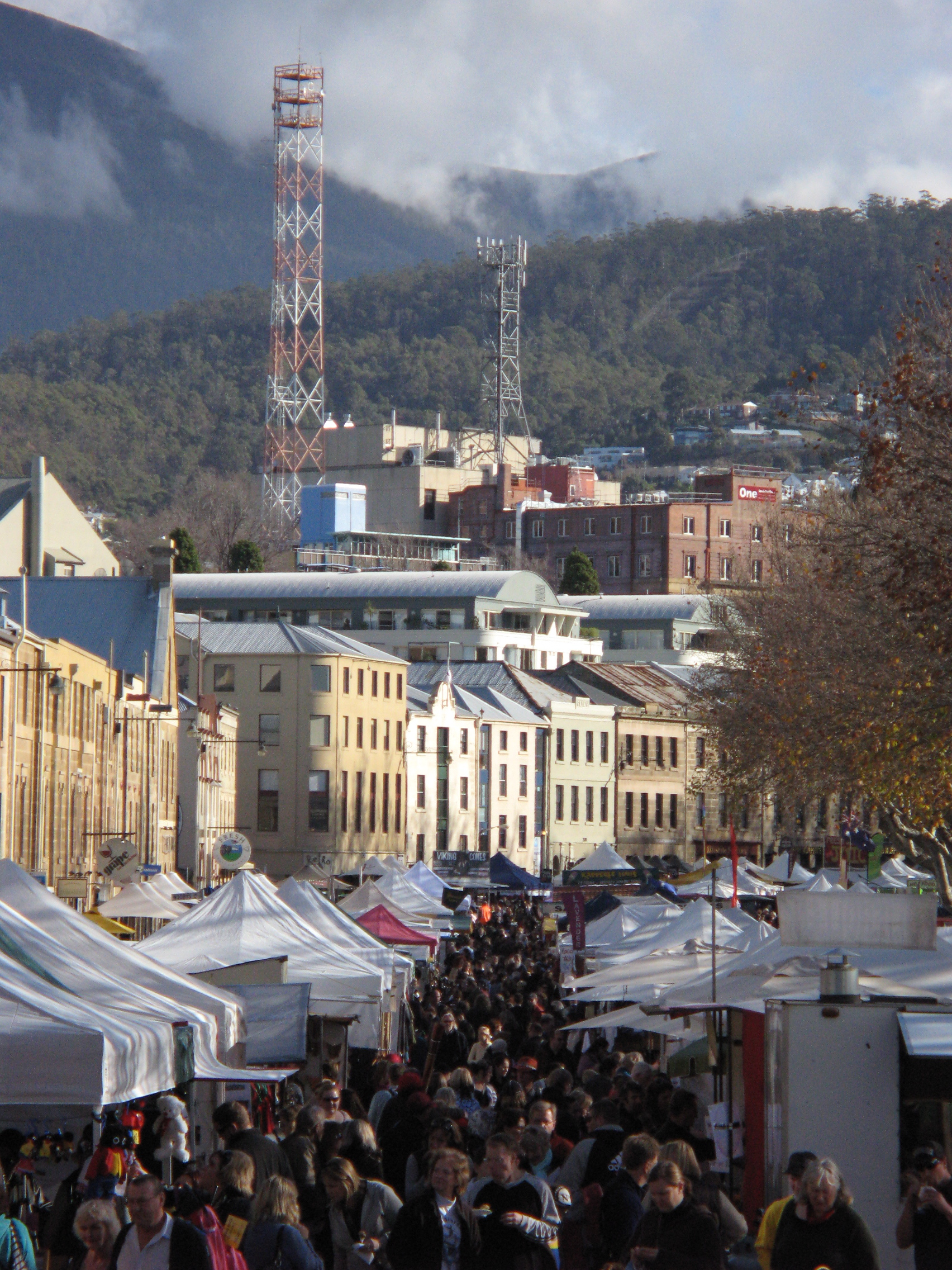
Salamanca Market May

==== Papua New Guinea ====
Drawing heavily on the anthropological literature, Benedicktsson argues that a distinct type of Melanesian market that is substantially different to other Asian markets, can be identified. The key characteristics of the PNG market are that it is dominated by producer-sellers, most of whom are women. Prices are set at the start of the day's trade, and rarely change. Haggling and aggressive selling are rarely practised. At the end of the day's trade, produce is not cleared, but rather is taken away for the seller's private consumption or is distributed among kin and close family.

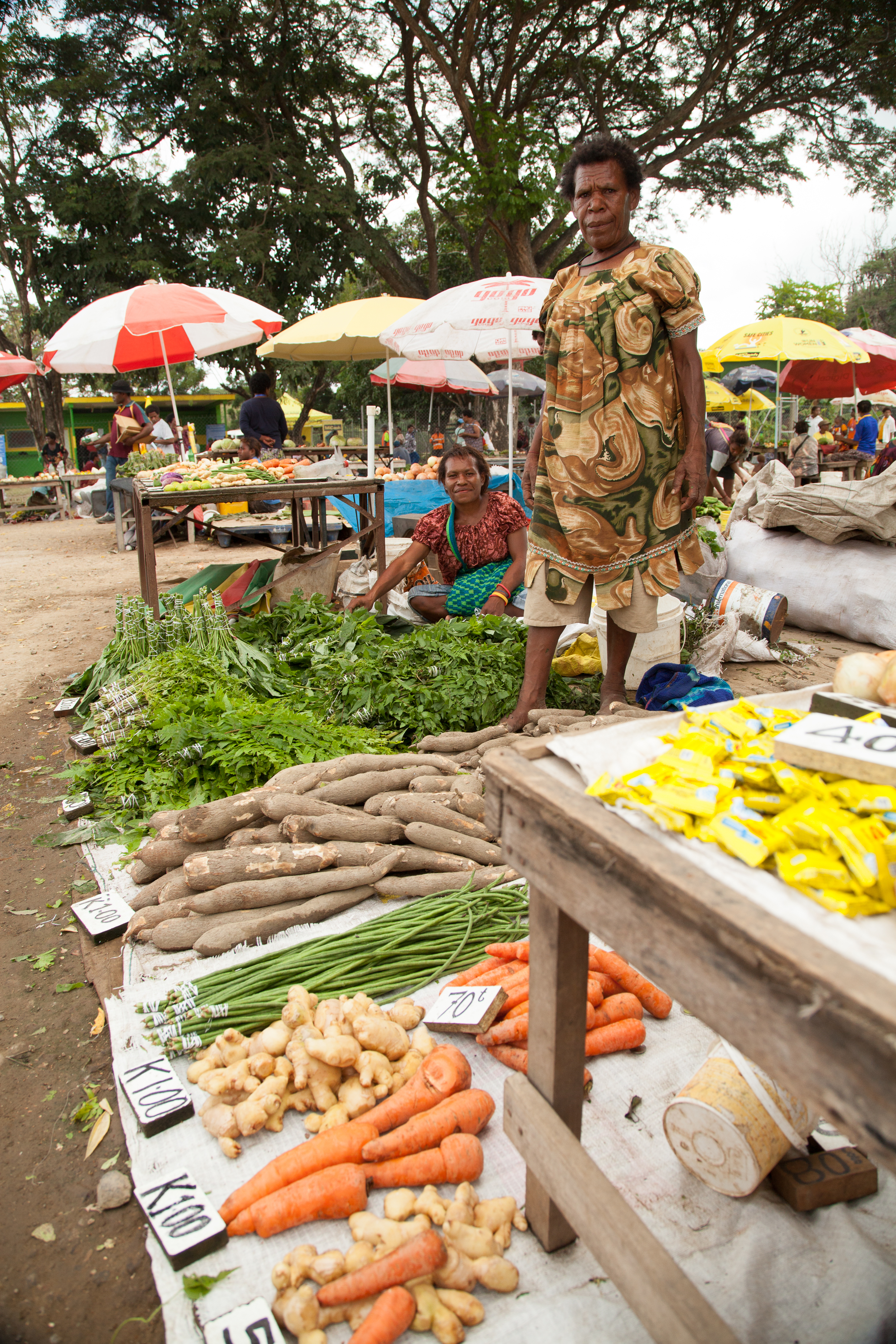
Gerehu Markets, Port Moresby, Papua New Guinea

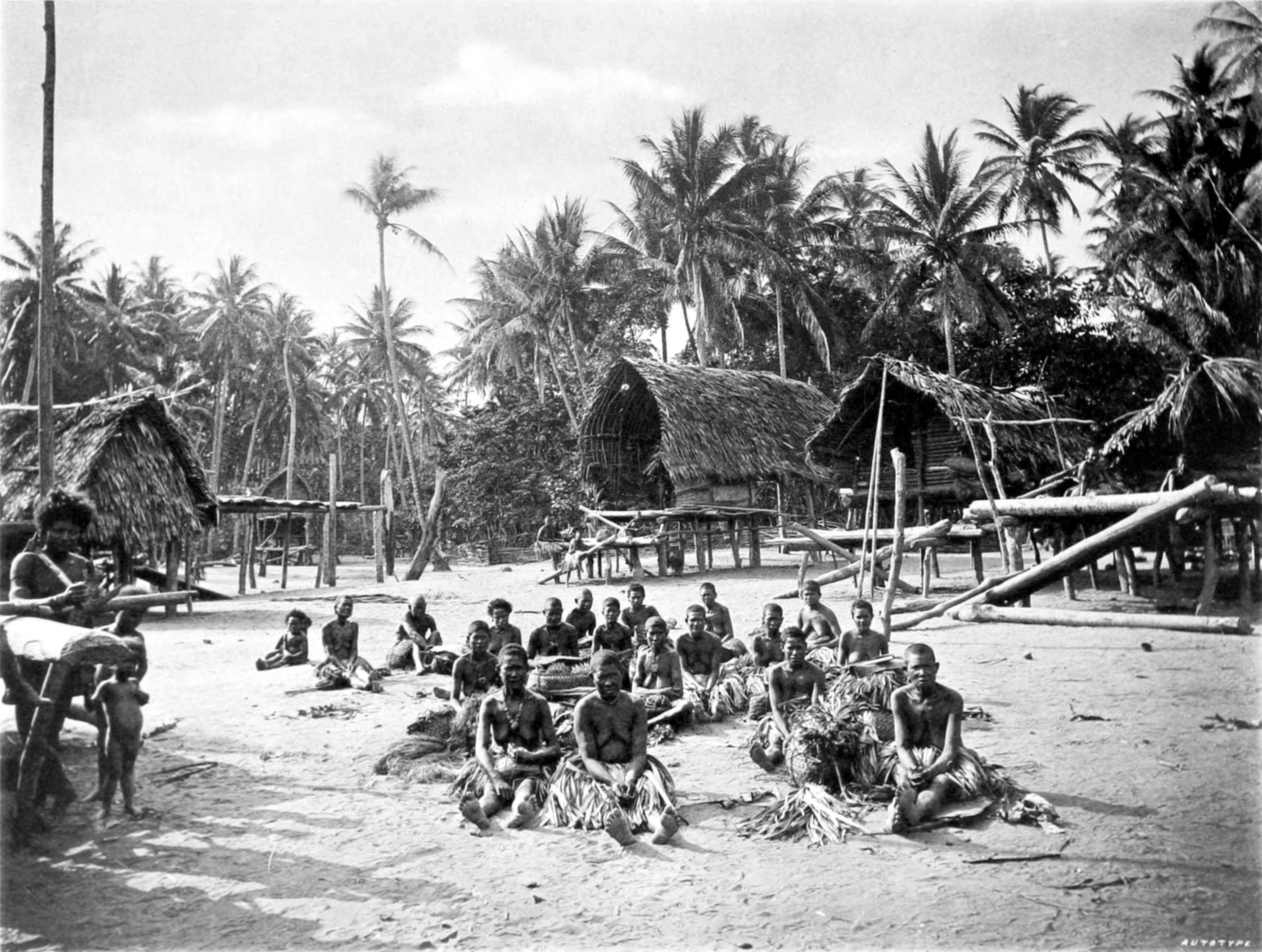
Kerepunu women at the market place of Kalo, 1885

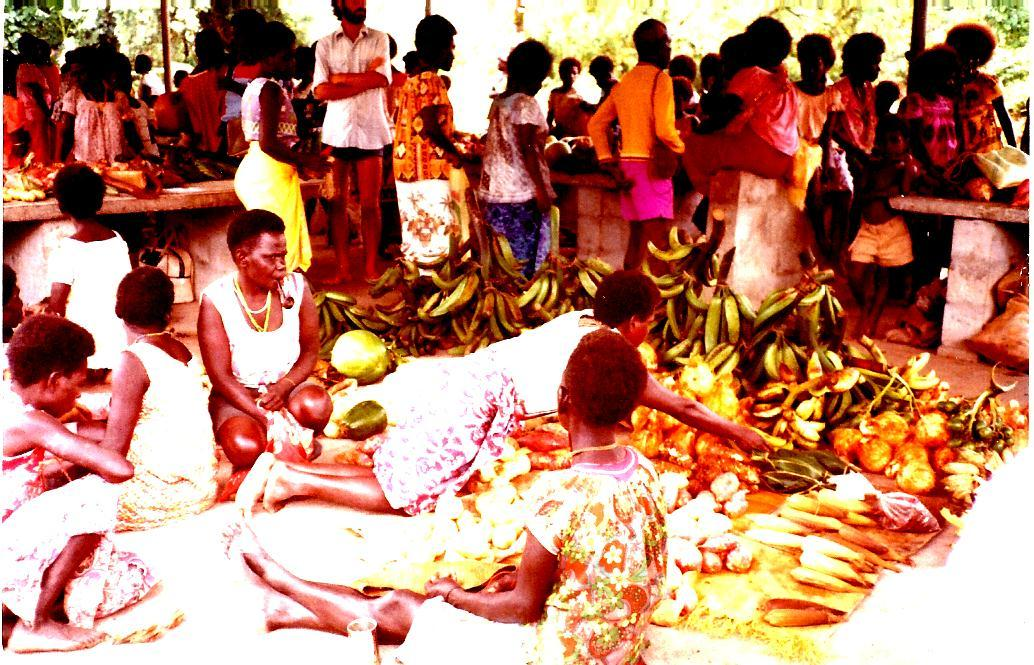
Buin NSP Saturday market, 1978

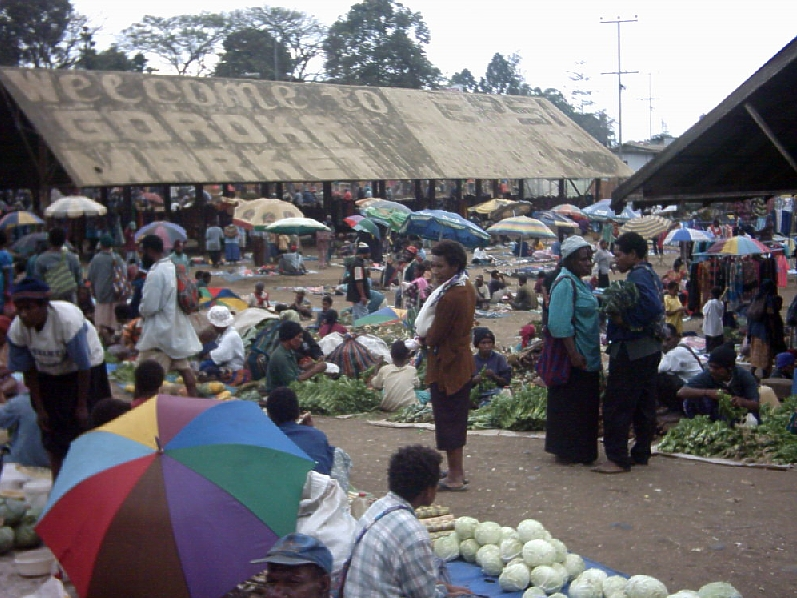
Goroka market

=== South America ===
==== Brazil ====
- Mercado Municipal – São Paulo, São Paulo
- Liberdade street market – São Paulo, São Paulo
- Mercado Público – Porto Alegre, Rio Grande do Sul
- Mercado Ver-o-Peso – Belém, Pará
- Mercado Adolpho Lisboa – Manaus, Amazonas
- Mercado Modelo – Salvador, Bahia
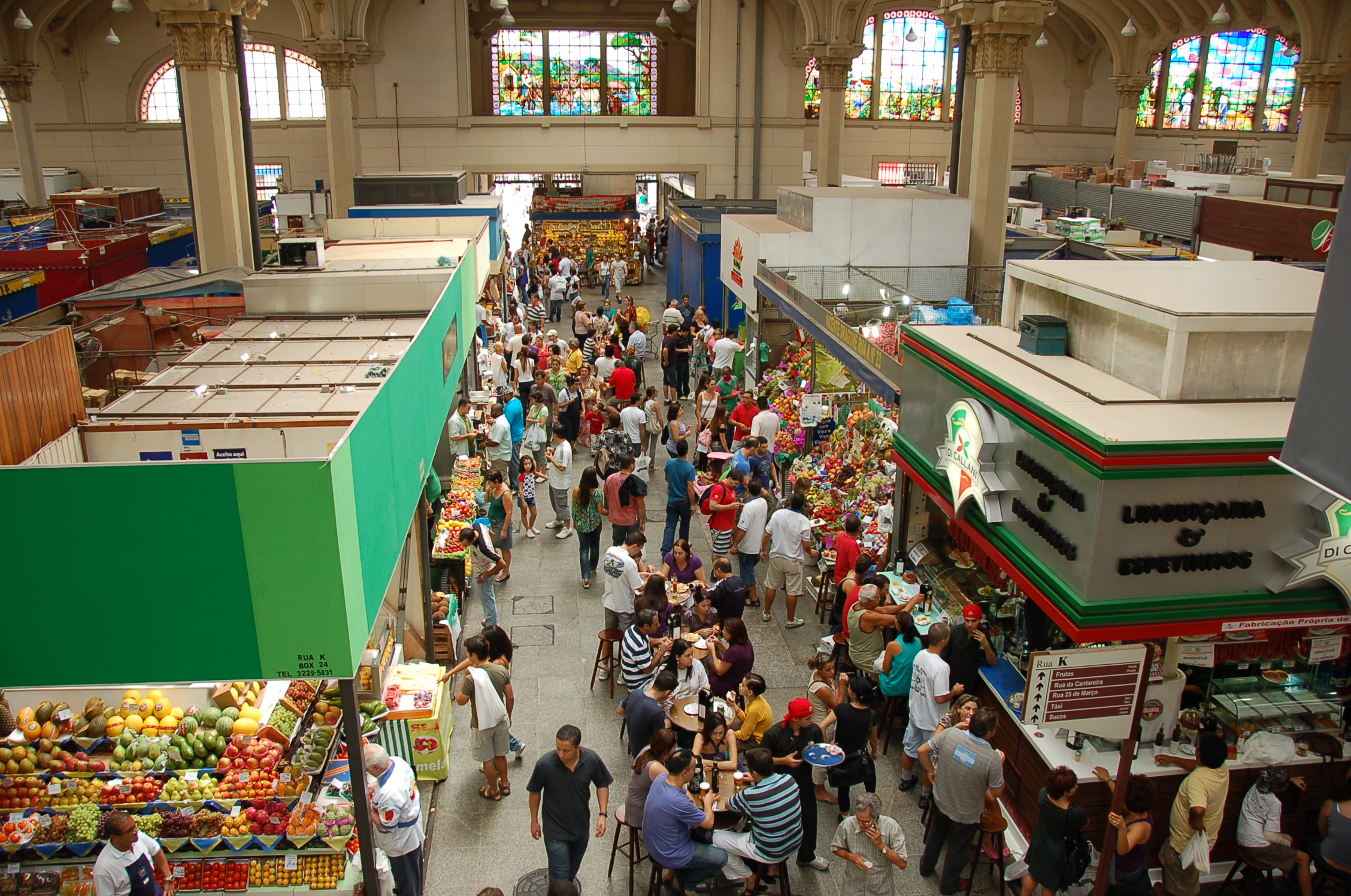
Mercado Municipal in São Paulo, Brazil

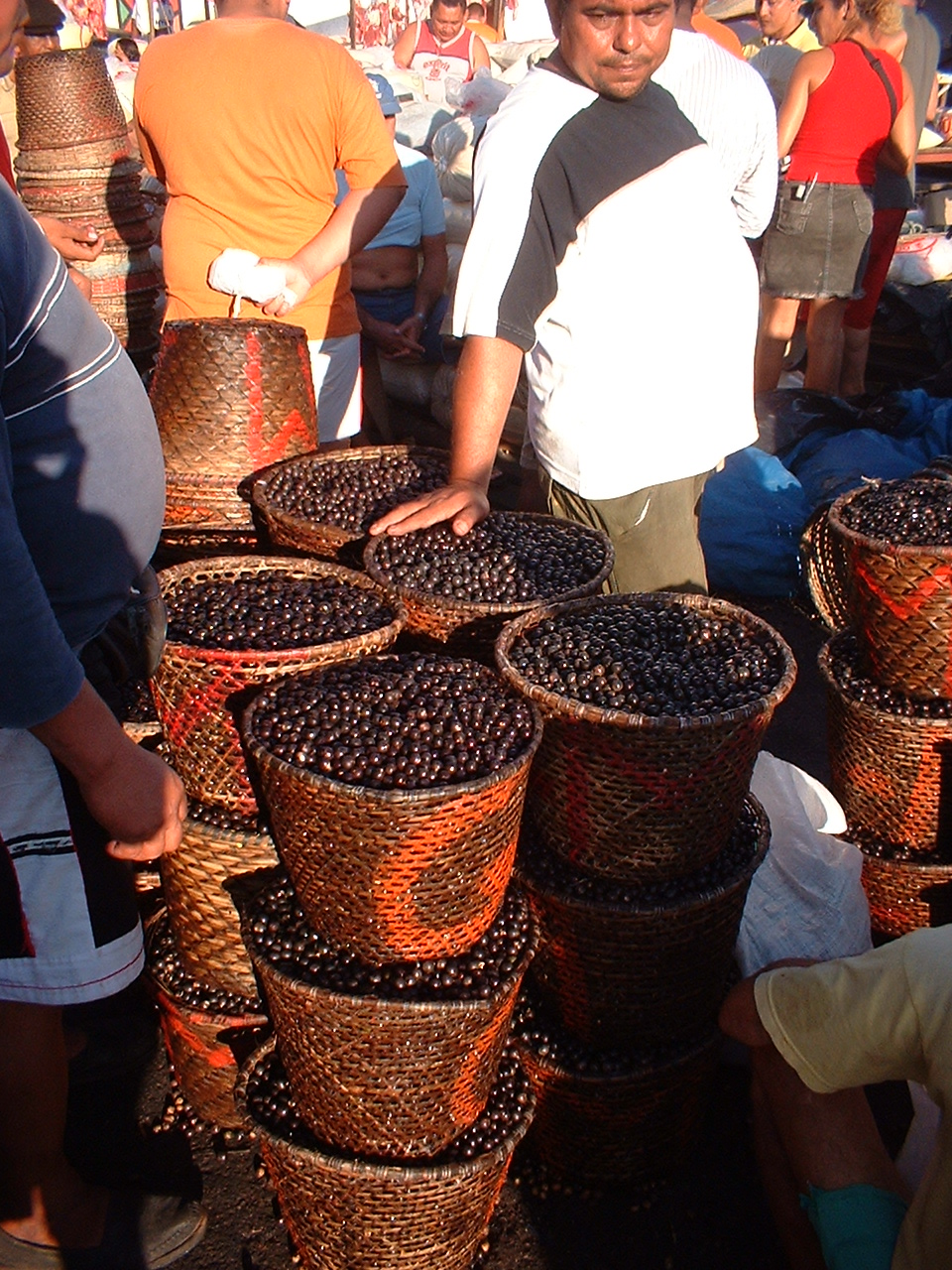
Açai vendor at the Ver-o-Peso Market, Belém, Brazil

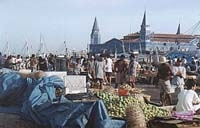
Fish seller at Belém, Pará, Brazil

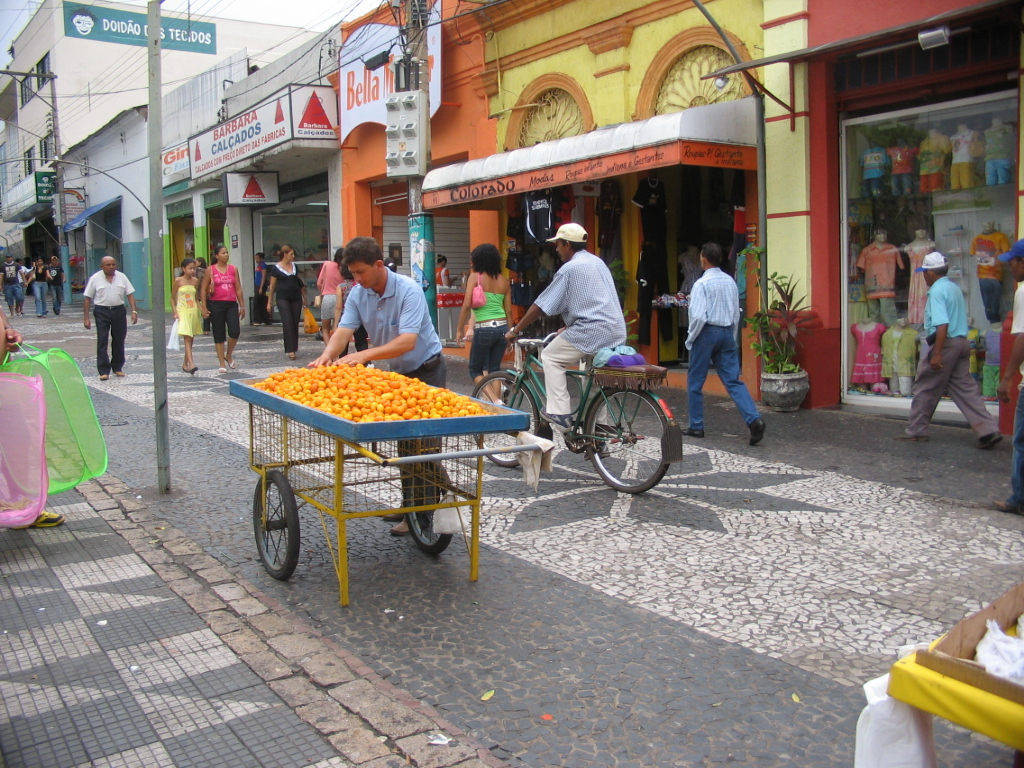
"Vendedor de pequi", fruit seller, a common sight in Brazil

==== Chile ====
- Mercado Central de Santiago, the central market of Santiago de Chile

==== Uruguay ====
- Mercado Modelo, a central fruit and vegetable wholesale market in Montevideo

== See also ==
- Artisanal food
- Bazaar
- Birmingham Market Police
- Charter
- Charter fair
- Charter Stones
- Costermonger
- City of London market constabularies
- Hawker
- History of marketing
- List of Christmas markets (from around the world)
- Liverpool Markets Police
- Market hall
- Market town
- Marketing
- Market cross - with list of UK market towns containing a market cross
- Mercat cross - in Scotland the market cross is known as a mercat cross
- Merchant
- Night market
- Licensed victualler
- Peddler
- Retail
- Souk or souq
- Street vendor
- Town privileges
- Wholesale marketing of food
