= Qualifications for professional social work =

Professional social workers are generally considered those who hold a professional degree in social work. In a number of countries and jurisdictions, registration or licensure of people working as social workers is required and there are mandated qualifications. In other places, the professional association sets academic and experiential requirements for admission to membership.

== United States ==
A social worker, practicing in the United States, usually requires a bachelor's degree (BSW or BASW) in social work from a Council on Social Work Education (CSWE) accredited program to receive a license in most states, although may have a master's degree (MSW) or a doctoral degree (Ph.D or DSW). The Bachelor of Social Work (BSW) degree is a four-year undergraduate degree. Usually the first two years consist of liberal arts courses and the last two years focus on social work classes in human development, policy/law, research, and practice. Programs accredited by the Council on Social Work Education require BSW students to complete a minimum of 400 field education or internship hours. Accredited BSW programs often allow students who are interested in obtaining a Master of Social Work degree to complete the degree in a shorter amount of time or waive courses.

In some areas, however, a social worker may be able to receive a license with a bachelor's or even associate degree in any discipline. The National Association of Social Workers (NASW) is the largest organization of professional social workers in the United States.

Depending on the university, the four-year degree may be structured in different ways and draws upon many fields, including social work theory, psychology, human development, sociology, social policy, research methods, social planning and social administration.

A person with a BSW is considered a "generalist" and the MSW is considered "a specialist or advanced generalist"; a Ph.D. or D.S.W. (Doctor of Social Work) generally conducts research, teaches, or analyzes policy, often in higher education settings.

Various states in the United States "protect" the use of the title social worker by statute. Use of the title requires licensure or certification in most states. The licensure or certification also requires a prelicensure examination through the ASWB (Association of Social Work Boards), with the exception of the State of California, who creates and administers their own licensing exam. Over half of all states offer licensure at various levels of social work practice, and clinical social work is regulated by licensure in all states. The pass rate for the Master's level licensing exam is around 74%.

== Latin America ==
In Latin America this is a four to five-year degree that can replace liberal arts subjects into health sciences, resulting in social work as a type of community psychology and socioeconomic studies, focused in hospitals, prisons or pedagogy, among others.

== Canada ==
A four-year Bachelor of Social Work (BSW) is required for entry into the field in most parts of Canada. In Alberta, the entry-level requirement is the diploma in social work practice. A Master's degree in Social Work (MSW) is usually required to provide psychotherapy treatment. Authorized Social Workers with advanced clinical certification in Alberta, British Columbia, New Brunswick and Saskatchewan are allowed to independently use the DSM (Diagnostic and Statistical Manual of Mental Disorders) in order to make a mental health diagnosis. These provinces hold a clinical registry for this purpose. In the province of Nova Scotia, MSW social workers can make provisional mental health diagnosis'.

In order to legally use the title "social worker", candidates must register with their provincial regulatory body. Some provinces also require an exam prerequisite for certification through the Association of Social Work Boards (ASWB).

== Nordic countries ==
Bachelor of Social Services (called socionom in Swedish and Danish, sosionom in Norwegian, and sosionomi in Finnish) is a degree in social welfare from Nordic universities. At the core it is based on the competences needed to work in social services. Courses in sociology, human rights, gerontology, community services, psychology, social security and entrepreneurship are part of the degree. Service orientation and client work is seen through a social pedagogical framework. The studies take three to five years. Degree holders are usually hired for services in Scandinavian welfare systems. NGO oriented services take place with families and people of all ages in areas such as: child protection, early childhood education, community work, substance abuse prevention or promotion of mental health.

In Norway, a Bachelor of Social Work takes three years to complete, and a Masters in Social Work takes five years.

In Sweden, training was originally provided in social work rather than social services. Instruction took place at specialized colleges (socialhögskola), which were integrated into the regular Swedish university system in 1977 as departments of social work within existing universities or university colleges.

== United Kingdom ==
The main qualification for social work is the undergraduate Bachelor's degree (BA, BSc or BSW) in social work, offered at British universities from September 2003 onwards. There is also available a master's degree (MA, MSc or MSW). These have replaced the previous qualifying award, the undergraduate Diploma in Social Work (DipSW), although the postgraduate counterpart, the postgraduate Diploma in Social Work (PGDipSW) is still awarded and allows the holder to register and practise as a social worker. The DipSW was first awarded in 1991 and phased out across the UK by 2009. Prior to this, the recognised qualification was the Certificate of Qualification in Social Work (CQSW), awarded between 1975 and 1991.

Purporting to be either a social worker or a student social worker without registering with the relevant Social Work Register and holding or undergoing training for the recognised qualifications is now a criminal offence. Social workers must renew their registration every two years. These regulations offer protection to vulnerable people by guaranteeing the professional regulation of people working as social workers. They also promote workforce development, as all social workers must participate in at least fifteen days of professional training over a two-year period in order to be eligible for renewal of their registration.

Non-registered or non-qualified social care practitioners in the United Kingdom, often referred to as Social Services Assistants, Child and Family Workers or Community Care Assistant or Community Care Workers (not to be confused with domiciliary or care home care workers), are unregistered social care practitioners that often do not hold any formal social work qualification and they must practice under the direct supervision of a registered social worker. This is not the case in Scotland where the scope of registration for social service workers is more advanced.

Within the mental health sector in the United Kingdom, social workers can train as an Approved Mental Health Professional and Approved Clinicians. With the implementation of the Mental Health Act 2007, this had replaced the previous Approved Social Worker role and is open to other professionals such as community psychiatric nurses, psychologists and occupational therapists, whilst maintaining a social work ethos. AMHPs are responsible for organising and contributing to assessments under the Mental Health Act 1983, as amended by the Mental Health Act 2007.

Newly-qualified social workers undertake an initial "Assessed and Supported Year in Employment" (AYSE) once they commence their first social work job.

After qualifying, social workers can undertake further training under the social work 'Post-Qualifying Framework'. Before 2007, there were four awards available under this framework:

- Post-Qualifying Award – for advanced social work practice and management
- Mental Health – training to become an Approved Mental Health Professional (AMHP), which may lead to being appointed as an Approved Clinician with further postgraduate and doctorate training.
- Child Care Award – qualification to work with children and young people
- Practice Teaching Award – qualification to work as a tutor, supervisor and assessor for social work students on their work placement

In 2007, the General Social Care Council and UK partners implemented a new framework which unified these awards into a simpler structure allowing broader study to count towards three levels of social work award: specialist, higher specialist, and advanced.

== Australia ==
A four-year Bachelor of Social Work (BSW) is required for entry into the occupation of Social Worker in Australia, although some universities also offer a two-year, accelerated, graduate-entry MSW. Graduates of courses recognised by the Australian Association of Social Workers (AASW) are eligible for membership. A person with overseas qualifications can apply for consideration of recognition of their qualifications via a formal application for assessment by the AASW. Australia is alone among developed English-speaking OECD countries in having no registration requirements for social workers. Most employers stipulate that applicants must be eligible for membership of the AASW, and only graduates of courses recognised by the AASW are eligible for membership. However AASW membership is not compulsory and only a third of social workers are members. Continuing Professional Development (CPD) is an ongoing requirement of accredited membership of the AASW and must incorporate accountability, gaining new knowledge and information & skill development (CPD Policy 2011/12, AASW). No such requirement exists for non-members.

== Job titles ==
Bachelors of Social Services graduates find jobs in a wide range of roles in the social services. Some may be in the public, private or the third sector.

- Social welfare supervisor
- Family worker
- Student welfare officer
- Project worker
- Project manager
- NGO employee
- Service entrepreneur
- Social welfare officer
