= Involuntary commitment by country =

Involuntary commitment or civil commitment is a legal process through which an individual who is deemed by a qualified agent to have symptoms of severe mental disorder is detained in a psychiatric hospital (inpatient) where they can be treated involuntarily.

Criteria for civil commitment are established by laws, which vary between nations.

== United Nations ==
United Nations General Assembly (resolution 46/119 of 1991), "Principles for the Protection of Persons with Mental Illness and the Improvement of Mental Health Care" is a non-binding resolution advocating certain broadly-drawn procedures for the carrying out of involuntary commitment. These principles have been used in many countries where local laws have been revised or new ones implemented. The UN runs programs in some countries to assist in this process.

== Australia ==
In Australia, court hearings are not required for involuntary commitment. Mental health law falls under state powers constitutionally. Each state thus has different laws, many of which have been updated in recent years.

=== Referral for service ===
The usual requirement is that a police officer or a physician determine that a person requires a psychiatric examination, usually through a psychiatric hospital. If the person is detained in the hospital, they usually must be seen by an authorized psychiatrist within a set period of time. In some states, after a further set period or at the request of the person or their representative, a tribunal hearing is held to determine whether the person should continue to be detained. In states where tribunals are not instituted, there is another form of appeal.

Some Australian states require that the person is a danger to the society or themselves; other states only require that the person be suffering from a mental illness that requires treatment. The Victorian Mental Health Act (1986) specifies in part that:

"(1) A person may be admitted to and detained in an approved mental health service as an involuntary patient in accordance with the procedures specified in this Act only if—

(a) the person appears to be mentally ill; and
(b) the person's mental illness requires immediate treatment and that treatment can be obtained by admission to and detention in an approved mental health service; and
(c) because of the person's mental illness, the person should be admitted and detained for treatment as an involuntary patient for his or her health or safety (whether to prevent a deterioration in the person's physical or mental condition or otherwise) or for the protection of members of the public; and
(d) the person has refused or is unable to consent to the necessary treatment for the mental illness; and
(e) the person cannot receive adequate treatment for the mental illness in a manner less restrictive of that person's freedom of decision and action.

There are additional qualifications and restrictions but the effect of these provisions is that people who are assessed by doctors as being in need of treatment may be admitted involuntarily without the need of demonstrating a risk of danger. This overcomes the pressure described above to exaggerate issues of violence, or to verbal statements, to obtain an admission.

=== Treatment ===
In general, once the person is under involuntary commitment, treatment may be instituted without further requirements. Some treatments, such as electroconvulsive therapy (ECT), often require further procedures to comply with the law before they may be administered involuntarily.

Community treatment orders can be used in the first instance or after a period of admission to hospital as a voluntary/involuntary patient. With the trend towards deinstitutionalization, this situation is becoming increasingly frequent, and hospital admission is restricted to people with severe mental illnesses.

== Finland ==
Involuntary commitment requires three criteria: 1) severe mental illness with impaired insight; 2) that a lack of treatment would worsen the condition or endanger the safety or security of the patient or others; 3) and other treatments or services are insufficient or inapplicable.

If found insane, criminal offenders may not be sentenced. Instead, they must be referred to THL (National Institute for Health and Welfare) for involuntary treatment. Niuvanniemi Hospital specializes in involuntary commitment of criminal patients.

== France ==
About 24% of patients in French psychiatric wards are committed involuntarily. A person may be committed if they are an imminent danger or at the request of either a third party, usually a family member, one or two physicians or a representative of the state.

- Classic admission: To involuntarily commit a person, are needed:
  - a handwritten request from a third party with a relationship to the person (e.g. a member of the patient's family or a care giver), excluding care givers working in the institution caring for the sick person,
  - two supporting medical certificates, at least one of which is drawn up by a doctor outside of the institution giving care to the person.
- Admission in case of imminent danger: a single medical certificate drawn up by a doctor who is not part of any establishment caring for the person, suffices to involuntarily commit a person. This practice has led to abusive banalisation according to a report by the health ministry.
- Admission in case of emergency: A handwritten request from a third party and a medical certificate suffice to involuntarily commit a person.

From an admission at the request of a representative the state to occur, the mentally ill person must be a danger to themselves or others, or cause a serious breach of public order, in which case the mayor (temporarily and only when there is a danger to the safety of persons) or the prefect, may issue a decree in support of a medical certificate issued by a doctor outside the receiving institution to admit that person.

== Germany ==
In Germany, there is a growing tendency to use the law on legal guardianship instead of mental health law for justification of involuntary commitment or treatment. A legal guardian decides that their ward must go into mental hospital for treatment, and the police then acts on this decision. This is simpler for the government and family members than the formal process for commitment under mental health laws.

In German criminal law, a person who was convicted of certain crimes can also be sentenced to be kept in preventive detention; see article on preventive detention.

== Israel ==
The Mental Health Care Act of 1991 regulates the rights of the mentally ill in Israel and defines the conditions under which the patient's freedom of choice can be restricted. The law replaced the Mental Health Law of 1955 which was enacted shortly after the establishment of the State of Israel

== Italy ==
In Italy the physician Giorgio Antonucci, in his work at the hospitals of Gorizia, Cividale del Friuli and Imola since the late 1960s, has avoided involuntary hospitalisation and any kind of coercion, rejecting the diagnosis as psychiatric prejudice. During the years 1973-1996 he worked on the dismantling of the psychiatric hospitals Osservanza and Luigi Lolli in Imola. He currently collaborates with the Italian branch of the Citizens Commission on Human Rights.

== Japan ==
In Japan, the Law on mental health and welfare for the mentally disabled (Japanese: 精神保健及び精神障害者福祉に関する法律) establishes the legal framework for involuntary commitment.

== Netherlands ==
In Dutch criminal law, a convict can be sentenced to involuntary psychiatric treatment in a special institute called a ''TBS'' clinic. TBS is an abbreviation for terbeschikkingstelling, literally meaning "being placed at disposal" (of the state). Legally, such a sentence is not regarded as punishment like a prison sentence, but as a special measure. Often, when a convict is sentenced to TBS, they first serve a prison sentence. The convict will then be placed in a clinic after serving time in prison (usually two-thirds of the original prison sentence, although this practice is under discussion).

According to Dutch law, meeting three conditions is required for a convict to be sentenced to TBS. These conditions are:

- the crime committed must have been directly related to a psychiatric disorder,
- recidivism must be likely, and
- the convict can not, or only partially, be held accountable for the crime.

To determine if these conditions are met, the suspect is observed in a forensic psychiatric detention center, the Pieter Baan Centre. Neither the prosecution or the defense can effectively challenge the Pieter Baan Centre's report, since it is the only institution that can conduct such investigations. Fatal mistakes have occurred, for instance, when a child molester regarded by the Pieter Baan Center as "not dangerous" killed a child after the molester was released. The conclusions in the centre's report are not binding; the judge can decide to ignore, or only partially accept them.

Every convict detained in a TBS clinic may get temporary leave after serving a certain time or after some progress in treatment. This is regarded as an essential part of treatment, as the convict will be gradually re-entering society this way. At first the convict will be escorted by a therapist, and will be allowed outside the clinic for only a few hours. After evaluation, time and freedom of movement will be expanded until the convict can move freely outside the clinic without escort (usually for one day at a time). At that time, the convict will find work or follow an education. Generally, the convict is released after being in this situation for one or two years without incident.

The time to be served in TBS can be indefinite, and it may be used as a form of preventive detention. Evaluation by the court will occur every one or two years. During these evaluations the court determines if any progress is made in treatment of the convict, and if it will be safe to release the convict into society. In general, the court will follow conclusions made by the TBS clinic.

Average time served in a TBS clinic by a convict is slightly over eight years.

=== Dutch TBS clinics ===
In the Netherlands there are currently 12 institutions regarded as TBS clinics:

- Inforsa/Arkin, Amsterdam
- Dr. Henri van der Hoevenstichting, Utrecht
- Dr. S. van Mesdagkliniek, Groningen
- Hoeve Boschoord, Boschoord
- FPC Veldzicht, Balkbrug
- Pompestichting, Nijmegen
- Oostvaarderskliniek, Almere
- De Kijvelanden/FPC Tweelanden, Poortugaal
- FPC Oldenkotte, Rekken (Closed on 4 september 2014)
- FPC De Rooyse Wissel, Venray
- GGz Drenthe, Assen
- GGz Eindhoven/De Woenselse Poort, Eindhoven

These institutions combined currently are holding about 1840 convicts.

By the end of the 20th century, it was concluded that some convicts could not be treated and therefore could not be safely released into society. For these convicts, TBS clinics formed special wards, called "long-stay wards". Transfer to such a ward means that the convict will no longer be actively treated, but merely detained. This is regarded as more cost-effective. In general, the convicts in these wards will be incarcerated for the rest of their lives, although their detention is eligible for regular review by the court.

=== Controversy ===
Since the latter half of the 1990s, considerable controversy has grown in Dutch society, about the TBS system. This controversy has two main areas. The first level of controversy resulted from the media increasingly reporting cases of convicts committing crimes while still in, or after, treatment in a TBS clinic.

Some examples of these cases are:

- During 1992, a truck driver was convicted of raping and murdering three young children. Eight years earlier he was released from a TBS clinic after being treated for child molestation.
- A convict, about to be released from a TBS clinic, murdered the owner of a garage in 1996 while under the influence of drugs.
- An ex-convict, treated in a TBS clinic, murdered two women in 1994 and 1997.
- A convict, still being treated by a TBS-clinic, randomly killed a man in the city of Groningen in 1999.
- Between 2000 and 2004, an ex-convict tortured several animals and killed a homeless man. He had been treated in a TBS clinic.
- In 2002 an ex-convict was sentenced for triple murder. He also had been released earlier by TBS.
- In 2005 a convict escaped his escort during leave. He was arrested several days later after killing a man.

Political and social attention increased, and debate started about the effectiveness of the TBS system and whether convicts should be granted leave from TBS clinics. Especially right-wing politicians suggested the TBS system be discarded altogether. Numerous articles in newspapers, magazines, television and radio programs and a revealing book written by an ex-convict (which for the first time openly questioned the effectiveness of the TBS-system) boosted discussion. Prior to that, any problems had been mostly denied by officials of the TBS-clinics themselves.

The center of attention became a highly renowned TBS clinic, Dr. S. Van Mesdagkliniek in the city of Groningen. Events that took place there, by the end of the 1990s and the first years of the 21st century, provoked the second reason for controversy. Concern rose about claims of unprofessional behavior by staff working in TBS clinics, and the Dr. S. Van Mesdagkliniek developed a poor reputation over these problems. This TBS clinic has been plagued with unprofessional and even criminal acts by its staff since 1999.

During that year, the clinic came under investigation by Dutch police after rumors about female staffmembers committing sexual offenses against convicts emerged. Five such cases were discovered during the investigation, and also numerous cases of drug-abuse, smuggling and trading of contraband such as alcohol, mobile phones, pornographic material, and hard drugs. It became apparent that staff members did not have the required education, had not been informed about rules and regulations, disregarded legal procedures, gave false testimonies, tampered with evidence, uttered false accusations against convicts, and intimidated colleagues. At least one psychiatrist, employed as such by the clinic, proved to be not qualified, and treatment of convicts was in many cases simply non-existent.

These problems had been known for long by the management but were kept hidden. After public outcry about this situation, management was replaced and all of the nine (at the time) TBS clinics in the Netherlands were subjected to investigation. Six of them proved to be below the required legal standards. However, problems did not end there. In spite of many measures taken by the government, convicts still were released without proper treatment. As a consequence, numerous crimes were committed by convicts that were regarded as treated by TBS clinics. Also, sexual offenses against convicts by staff members and smuggling of contraband did not cease in several TBS clinics. In 2006, the Dutch government formed a committee to investigate the TBS system. Some problems, however not the worst, were recognized and countermeasures were implemented. One of the known actual results is that fewer convicts escape during temporary release.

Controversy regarding the, often praised, Dutch TBS system continued. In 2005, a staff member working in the Dr. S. Van Mesdagkliniek was caught smuggling liquor to convicts suffering from alcohol-related problems. In 2007, a female staff member committed sexual offenses against a convict, and had smuggled contraband. She was sentenced to three months in prison in 2009. That same year, investigation proved convicts still had ample access to illicit drugs and four inmates from the Dr. S. Van Mesdagkliniek were arrested for possession of child pornography. Many crimes committed by released convicts treated in TBS clinics escape statistics because the crimes were committed in other countries, or because they differ from the crime the convict was originally convicted for (many convicts released from TBS clinics find their way in illegal drug trade and related crimes). Because there seems to be no acceptable alternative available, political support for the much troubled TBS system remains, in spite of the controversy.

== Russia ==
Individuals in Russia can be involuntarily admitted by psychiatrists directly with an appeal process.

== New Zealand ==
The Mental Health (Compulsory Assessment and Treatment) Act 1992, replaced the previous Act, enacted in 1969. Although there were several reasons to replace the previous act, one key aspect was the lack of review, as once the Reception Order had been made by a District Court judge and two doctors, that the proposed patient be taken to hospital: "Subject to the provisions of this Act, every reception order, whether made before or after the commencement of this Act, shall continue in force until the patient is discharged." (MHA 1969 s28(2)) Despite the deinstitutionalization that began in New Zealand during the 1960s, as in many other Western countries, many patients stayed at the psychiatric hospital for years, as the original reception order remained in force. Another reason to review the former act was that patients appeared at the District Court (formerly the Magistrates Court until 1980) - which hears all but the most serious criminal cases. The present Act emphasises that Mental Health Hearings be heard at the Family Court instead, to remove any implication that the patient is being detained in hospital due to a criminal act. It does, however, provide that Mental Health Hearings may take place at the District Court, if there is no other suitable alternative. Often the Family Court will sit at the Mental Health Inpatient Unit.

There are multiple checks and balances built into the present committal procedures. As in the United Kingdom, the process is generally known as "sectioning".

Section 8A provides that any person, aged 18 or over, who has seen the proposed patient within the last 72 hours, may apply to the Director of Area Mental Health Services (DAMHS), to have that person seen by a psychiatrist, against their wishes. The person must be a danger to themselves or others, or be unable to care for themselves. Section 8B requires that the person be seen by a doctor, preferably their own General Practitioner, to give their opinion as to whether the applicant is correct in their statements about the proposed patient's behaviour. If the doctor is satisfied, this paperwork is signed, and the process continues to Section 9 where Duly Authorised Officers (DAOs) - operating as agents of the DAMHS, have the power to detain the person for six hours, and during that time, they have the power to transport the proposed patient to the psychiatrist. This is usually at a hospital, but the patient may be seen at a police station, depending on the circumstances. If the proposed patient refuses to accompany them, the Police will assist under the Memorandum of Understanding between the Ministry of Health and the New Zealand Police.

Under s10 they are formally interviewed by the psychiatrist, and if they are to be admitted, a s11 is issued that detains the patient for assessment and treatment at an inpatient mental health unit, for up to five days. Following this, a s12 review is held, and if necessary the patient can be held under s13 for fourteen days. At the end of this time, the psychiatrist must apply for a Court Hearing as to whether the patient can be treated compulsorily for any longer. Section 14(4) gives up to fourteen days for the hearing to occur. The detention sections (11, 13, & 14(4)) can be done in the outpatient setting, but in practice, most compulsory patients are detained at a hospital.

Two compulsory treatment orders are available. Section 29 is a Community Treatment Order, and the Act states that this should be applied for.

The patient can only be recalled to hospital twice for two fourteen-day periods in the six months that it lasts.

If a community order is not suitable (for example, due to the risk posed by the patient to themselves or others), a s30 Inpatient Treatment Order can be applied for, where the patient is either in hospital, or on leave from hospital.

In either case, two health professionals must apply to the Family Court - the psychiatrist, backed by a second health professional, usually a registered nurse, sometimes a social worker.

People who have committed a crime while mentally unwell are subject to the Criminal Procedure (Mentally Impaired Persons) Act 2003, although the Mental Health Act also refers to their care. If taken into custody, it is a matter for the Court as to whether they will go to prison and have their mental health issues treated whilst imprisoned, or whether they are "insane" in the legal sense, in which case they are detained at a Forensic Mental Health Unit. These are located at Auckland, Hamilton, Wellington, Christchurch, and Dunedin. The Acts described provide also for the transfer of patients between prisons and Forensic Mental Health Units, and the reasons for doing this.

New Zealand has found that closing its large country psychiatric hospitals and replacing them with small inpatient units, and a community care model, does not always mean better care. While many people were released who were able to adapt to, and become part of, their communities, some patients were unable to adapt. The current system is not set up for people who require long term closely supervised mental health care.

== Singapore ==
The Mental Health (Care and Treatment) Act was passed in 2008 to regulate the involuntary detention of a person in a psychiatric institution for the treatment of a mental disorder, or in the interest of the health and safety of the person or the persons around him.

== South Africa ==
In South Africa, the Mental Health Care Act of 2002 allows for involuntary admission when a person with a mental illness, whose clinical presentation justifies admission, is deemed "likely to inflict serious harm to themselves or others." Additionally, involuntary admission may be necessary to protect the individual's "financial interests or reputation" if they refuse admission. The act sets out criteria and procedures to protect the individual's rights, such as the right to legal representation and the right to be heard at hearings, and well-being of the individual during the process of involuntary admission and treatment. The process involves an application for admission submitted to a mental health review board or a magistrate's court.

== Switzerland ==
Switzerland has a high proportion of involuntary commitments (German: Zwangzulassung, French: placement forcé) compared to other European countries. Almost 25% of psychiatric patients were admitted involuntarily according to a 2009 study.

The conditions and procedure of involuntary commitments are regulated by Articles 426 to 439 of the Swiss Civil Code.

== United Kingdom ==
In the United Kingdom, the process known in the United States as involuntary commitment is informally known as "detaining" or "sectioning," using various sections of the Mental Health Act 1983 (covering England and Wales), the Mental Health (Northern Ireland) Order 1986 and the Mental Health (Care and Treatment) (Scotland) Act 2003 that provide its legal basis.

In England and Wales, approved mental health professionals have a lead role in coordinating Mental Health Act assessments, which they conduct in cooperation with usually two medical practitioners. Under the Mental Health Act, detention is determined by utility and purpose. Mentally ill individuals may be detained under Section 2 for a period of assessment lasting up to 28 days or Section 3 for a period of treatment lasting up to 6 months (though this period can be renewed). Patients already on a ward may be detained under section 5(2) for up to 72 hours for the purposes of allowing an assessment to take place for Section 2 or 3. Separate sections deal with mentally ill criminal offenders. In all cases detention needs to be justified on the basis that the person has a mental disorder and poses a risk of harm to his/her own health, safety, or the safety of others (as determined by the 'Approved' Mental Health Professional(s)). A Section 3 detention can be applied for by the person's nearest relative or, if the nearest relative agrees, by an approved mental health professional (AMHP). More specifically, according to Article 11 of the Mental Health Act the AMHP can make an application that a person be detained for treatment under section 3 only if the AMHP has consulted the person who appears to be the patient's nearest relative (unless it is not reasonably practicable or would cause unreasonable delay) and if the nearest relative has not told the AMHP or the LSSA that they object.

Under the amended Mental Health Act 2007, which came into force in November 2008 to be detained under Section 3 for treatment, appropriate treatment must be available in the place of detention. Supervised Community treatment orders signifies that people can be discharged to the community on a conditional basis, remaining liable to recall to hospital if they break the conditions of the community treatment order.

In 2020, as part of the response to COVID-19, Parliament passed the Coronavirus Act 2020 which amends the Mental Health Act to allow for sectioning with the approval of only one medical practitioner.

== United States ==
State law governs involuntary commitment, and procedures vary from state to state. In some jurisdictions, laws regarding the commitment of juveniles may vary, with what is the de facto involuntary commitment of a juvenile perhaps de jure defined as "voluntary" if his parents agree, though he may still have a right to protest and attempt to get released. However, there is a body of case law governing the civil commitment of individuals under the Fourteenth Amendment through Supreme Court rulings beginning in 1975 with the ruling that involuntary hospitalization and/or treatment violates an individual's civil rights in O'Connor v. Donaldson. This ruling forced individual states to change their statutes. For example, the individual must exhibit behavior that poses a danger to himself or others in order to be held, the hold must be for evaluation only, and a court order must be received for more than very short term treatment or hospitalization (typically no longer than 72 hours). This ruling has severely limited involuntary treatment and hospitalization in the U.S. In the U.S. the specifics of the relevant statutes vary from state to state.

In 1979, Addington v. Texas set the bar for involuntary commitment for treatment by raising the burden of proof required to commit persons from the usual civil burden of proof of "preponderance of the evidence" to the higher standard of "clear and convincing evidence".

An example of involuntary commitment procedures is the Baker Act used in Florida. Under this law, a person may be committed only if they present a danger to themselves or others. A police officer, doctor, nurse or licensed mental health professional may initiate an involuntary examination that lasts for up to 72 hours.

Within this time, two psychiatrists may ask a judge to extend the commitment and order involuntary treatment. The Baker Act also requires that all commitment orders be reviewed every six months in addition to ensuring certain rights to the committed including the right to contact outsiders. Also, a person under an involuntary commitment order has a right to counsel and a right to have the state provide a public defender if they cannot afford a lawyer.

While the Florida law allows police to initiate the examination, it is the recommendations of two psychiatrists that guide the decisions of the court.

In the 1990s, involuntary commitment laws were extended under various state laws commonly recognized under the umbrella term, SVP laws, to hold some convicted sex offenders in psychiatric facilities after their prison terms were completed. (This is generally referred to as "civil commitment," not "involuntary commitment," since involuntary commitment can be criminal or civil). This matter has been the subject of a number of cases before the Supreme Court, most notably Kansas v. Hendricks and United States v. Comstock in regard to the Adam Walsh Child Protection and Safety Act, which does not require a conviction on sex offenses, but only that the person be in federal custody and be deemed a "sexually dangerous person".

=== Specific requirements by state ===
In Arizona, the government can mandate inpatient treatment for anyone determined to be "persistently or acutely disabled." Virtually anyone who suspects that someone has mental problems and needs help could file an application to a state-licensed healthcare agency for a court-ordered evaluation.

In Connecticut, individuals committed must possess "psychiatric disabilities and is dangerous to himself or herself or others or gravely disabled". "Gravely disabled" has usually been interpreted to mean that the person is unable on their own to obtain adequate food, shelter and clothing.

In Iowa, any "interested person" may begin commitment proceedings by submitting a written statement to the court. If the court finds that the respondent is "seriously mentally impaired," the respondent will be placed in a psychiatric hospital for further evaluation and possibly treatment. Further hearings are required at specific intervals for as long as the person is being involuntarily held.

The Michigan Mental Health Code provides that a person "whose judgment is so impaired that he or she is unable to understand his or her need for treatment and whose continued behavior as the result of this mental illness can reasonably be expected, on the basis of competent clinical opinion, to result in significant physical harm to himself or herself or others" may be subjected to involuntary commitment, a provision paralleled in the laws of many other jurisdictions.

The Michigan Mental Health Code allows for one to petition a court to order assisted outpatient treatment for patients with such impaired judgment, which compels them to comply with treatment to avoid relapses. One can petition for assisted outpatient treatment along with, or instead of, hospitalization.

In Nevada, prior to confining someone, the state must demonstrate that the person "is mentally ill and, because of that illness, is likely to harm himself or others if allowed his liberty."

In Oregon, the standard that the allegedly mentally ill person "Peter [h]as been committed and hospitalized twice in the last three years, is showing symptoms or behavior similar to those that preceded and led to a prior hospitalization and, unless treated, will continue, to a reasonable medical probability, to deteriorate to become a danger to self or others or unable to provide for basic needs" may be substituted for the danger to self or others standard.

In Texas, the standard is that, in the judgment of the person seeking involuntary commitment, 1) the person is mentally ill, and 2) because of that mental illness "there is a substantial risk of serious harm to the person or to others unless the person is immediately restrained".

The Utah standard is that the proposed patient has a mental illness that poses a substantial danger. "Substantial danger" means the person, by his or her behavior, due to mental illness: (a) is at serious risk to: (i) commit suicide, (ii) inflict serious bodily injury on himself or herself; or (iii) because of his or her actions or inaction, suffer serious bodily injury because he or she is incapable of providing the basic necessities of life, such as food, clothing, and shelter; (b) is at serious risk to cause or attempt to cause serious bodily injury; or (c) has inflicted or attempted to inflict serious bodily injury on another.

In Wisconsin, the District II Wisconsin Court of Appeals ruled in 2011 that patients with Alzheimer's disease cannot be involuntary committed under Chapter 51 and can only be involuntarily committed for residential care and custody under Chapter 55. The court left open whether this applies also to persons with a dual diagnosis.

=== Controversy about liberty ===
The impact of involuntary commitment on the right of self-determination has been a cause of concern. Critics of involuntary commitment have advocated that "the due process protections... provided to criminal defendants" be extended to them. The Libertarian Party opposes the practice in its platform. Thomas Szasz and the anti-psychiatry movement have also been prominent in challenging involuntary commitment. The American Association for the Abolition of Involuntary Mental Hospitalization (AAAIMH) was an organization founded in 1970 by Thomas Szasz, George Alexander, and Erving Goffman for the purpose of abolishing involuntary psychiatric intervention, particularly involuntary commitment, against individuals.

The founding of the AAAIMH was announced by Szasz in 1971 in the American Journal of Public Health and American Journal of Psychiatry. The association provided legal help to psychiatric patients and published a journal, The Abolitionist. The organization was dissolved in 1980.

A small number of individuals in the U.S. have opposed involuntary commitment in those cases in which the diagnosis forming the justification for the involuntary commitment rests, or the individuals say it rests, on the speech or writings of the person committed, saying that to deprive the person of liberty based in whole or part on such speech and writings violates the First Amendment. Other individuals have opposed involuntary commitment on the basis that they claim (despite the amendment generally being held to apply only to criminal cases) it violates the Fifth Amendment in a number of ways, particularly its privilege against self-incrimination, as the psychiatrically examined individual may not be free to remain silent, and such silence may actually be used as "proof" of his "mental illness".

Although patients involuntarily committed theoretically have a legal right to refuse treatment, refusal to take medications or participate in other treatments is noted by hospital staff. Court reviews usually are heavily weighted toward the hospital staff, with the patient input during such hearings minimal. In Kansas v. Hendricks, the U.S. Supreme Court found that civil commitment is constitutional regardless of whether any treatment is provided.

=== Alternatives ===
Accompanying deinstitutionalization was the development of laws expanding the power of courts to order people to take psychiatric medication on an outpatient basis. Though the practice had occasionally occurred earlier, outpatient commitment was used for many people who would otherwise have been involuntarily committed. The court orders often specified that a person who violated the court order and refused to take the medication would be subject to involuntary commitment.

Involuntary commitment is distinguished from conservatorship and guardianship. The intent of conservatorship or guardianship is to protect those not mentally able to handle their affairs from the effects of their bad decisions, particularly with respect to financial dealings. For example, a conservatorship might be used to take control of the finances of a person with dementia, so that the person's assets and income are used to meet their basic needs, e.g., by paying rent and utility bills.

Advance psychiatric directives may have a bearing on involuntary commitment.

=== Individual state policies and procedures ===
==== US military ====
The service member can be held under the so-called Boxer law (DoD Directive 6490.04).

==== District of Columbia ====
In the District of Columbia, any police officer, physician, or mental health professional can request to have an individual evaluated at St. Elizabeths Hospital, where they may be detained for up to 48 hours at the direction of the physician on duty. A family member or concerned citizen can also petition the Department of Mental Health, but the claim will be evaluated prior to the police acting upon it.

To be held further requires that a request be filed with the Department of Mental Health. However, this only can keep the patient involuntary admitted for up to seven days. For further commitment, the patient is evaluated by a mental health court, part of family court, for which the public defender assists the patient. This can result in the patient being held up to one year at which point the patient returns to mental health court.

This is different for someone first admitted to St. Elizabeths Hospital due to criminal charges. If found to not ever become competent for trial, they will be evaluated via a Jackson hearing for possible continued commitment to protect the public. If they have been found not guilty by reason of insanity, their dangerousness is evaluated at a Bolton Hearing.

==== Maryland ====
In Maryland, any person may request, via an Emergency Evaluation form, that another individual be evaluated against their will by an emergency room physician for involuntary admission. If the judge concurs, he will direct the police to escort the individual to the hospital. A licensed physician, psychologist, social worker, or nurse practitioner who has examined the patient or a police officer may bring a potential patient to the emergency room for forced evaluation without approval from a judge. The patient may be kept in the hospital for up to thirty hours.

If by then two physicians, or one physician and one psychologist then decide that the patient meets the Maryland criteria for an involuntary psychiatric admission, then he or she may be kept inpatient involuntarily for up to ten days. During this time, an administrative law judge determines if the following criteria for longer civil commitment are met:

- a person has a mental illness;
- a person needs inpatient care or treatment;
- a person presents a danger to themselves or to others;
- a person is unable or unwilling to be admitted voluntarily;
- there is no available, less restrictive form of care or treatment to meet the person's needs.

==== Texas ====
In Texas a person may be subject to involuntary commitment by:

- A peace officer, without a warrant, if A) the officer believes that 1) the person is mentally ill, 2) because of that mental illness "there is a substantial risk of serious harm to the person or to others unless the person is immediately restrained", and B) the officer also believes that there is insufficient time to obtain a warrant.
- A guardian of the person of a ward under the age of 18, if the guardian believes that 1) the ward is mentally ill, 2) because of that mental illness "there is a substantial risk of serious harm to the ward or to others unless the ward is immediately restrained".
- An adult may file an application for emergency detention of another person; the application must meet seven outlined items which indicate that, in the applicant's belief, that the person to be detained is mentally ill and poses a threat to the person or to others, why the person considers this to be the case, and the relationship of the applicant to the person.

A person cannot be held for more than 48 hours, and must be released by 4 PM on the day the 48-hour period ends, unless:

- a written order for protective custody is obtained,
- the 48-hour period ends on a Saturday, Sunday, or legal holiday, or before 4 PM on the first succeeding business day (in which case the person may only be held until 4 PM on the first succeeding business day), or
- if extremely hazardous weather events exist or a disaster occurs (in which case, the period may be extended in 24-hour increments by written order specifically stating the weather event or disaster).

Upon release, unless the person was arrested or objects, the person (at the expense of the county where s/he was apprehended) must be transported to either 1) the place where s/he was apprehended, 2) the person's residence in the state, or 3) another suitable location.

==== Virginia ====
As of 2008, Virginia was one of only five states requiring imminent danger to involuntarily commit someone. But after the Virginia Tech Massacre, there was significant political consensus to strengthen the protections for society and allow more leniency in determining that an individual needed to be committed against their will.

- the person has a mental illness and there is a substantial likelihood that, as a result of mental illness, the person will, in the near future, (1) cause serious physical harm to himself or others as evidenced by recent behavior causing, attempting, or threatening harm and other relevant information, if any
- the person has a mental illness and there is a substantial likelihood that, as a result of mental illness, the person will, in the near future, (2) suffer serious harm due to his lack of capacity to protect himself from harm or to provide for his basic human needs

"Imminent danger" was found to have too much variability throughout Virginia due to vagueness. The new standard is more specific in that substantial likelihood is more clear. However, to not limit potential detainee's freedoms too much it is characterized by the time limit of near future. "Recent acts" is legally established to require more than a mere recitation of past events.
