= Fixated Threat Assessment Centre =

UK police/mental health unit

The Fixated Threat Assessment Centre (FTAC) is a UK police/mental health unit, whose function is to manage the risk to public figures from stalkers and individuals who are fixated on high profile public figures or prominent protected sites. It was formed in 2006 in acknowledgement that perpetrators of attacks and other unwanted incidents overwhelmingly suffered from psychosis, and could often be identified in advance of any incidents from precursor behavioural signs. Preventive treatment could then be applied, for the protection of the relevant public figures as well as the families and neighbours of the sufferer. It is jointly managed by the Home Office, the Department of Health and Metropolitan Police Service

== Rationale ==
The rationale for a joint police/mental health unit was the finding that the main danger of death or serious injury to politicians in Western Europe came from attacks by people suffering from a mental health illness, who had given warnings of what they might do in the form of inappropriate, harassing or threatening communications or approaches towards the politicians in question. A similar picture was found in a study of historical attacks on the British royal family. A separate detailed study of recent inappropriate communications and approaches to members of the royal family found that 83% of the individuals concerned were suffering from psychosis.

Similar findings have come from the United States, where forensic psychiatrist Park Dietz has written: “Every instance of an attack on a public figure by a lone stranger in the United States for which adequate information has been made publicly available has been the work of a mentally disordered person who issued one or more pre-attack signals in the form of inappropriate letters, visits or statements...." The role of FTAC in the UK is to detect such signals, to evaluate the risks involved and to intervene to reduce them. Such intervention often entails the obtaining of treatment and care for the fixated individual from psychiatric and social services and general practitioners in their town of residence.

== The Fixated ==
The word ‘fixated’ in the name of the unit indicates that the main motivational drives behind the stalking of public figures are pathologically intense fixations on individuals or causes, these being obsessive pre-occupations pursued to an abnormally intense degree. In the case of those pursuing the Royal Family, these fixations divide between beliefs that the individual was a member of the family or married to a member of the family; that the royal personage was involved in plots to persecute them; and that the Royal Family were culpable for failing to redress a particular grievance, often delusional, with which the individual was angrily obsessed.

== Staffing and role ==
FTAC was set up in 2006, jointly managed by the Home Office, the Department of Health and Metropolitan Police Service. It is staffed by eleven police officers, four full-time senior forensic nurses, a full-time senior social worker and a number of senior forensic psychiatrists and psychologists from the Barnet, Enfield and Haringey Mental Health NHS Trust and the Oxleas NHS Foundation Trust. FTAC receives around 1,000 referrals a year of people who have engaged in threatening or harassing communications towards politicians or the Royal Family. Around half are assessed as being of low risk after initial enquiries. The remainder are investigated by FTAC staff. They may then be referred to local health services for further assessment and potential involuntary commitment. In some cases, they may be detained by police under the section 136 powers of the Mental Health Act 1983 prior to referral.

Although run by London's Metropolitan Police Service, FTAC is responsible for dealing nationally with the stalking or harassment of public figures by lone individuals. According to its founder, David James, it attempts not only to provide protection for the subjects of obsessive attention, but also to help people with obsessions who have mental illnesses that might otherwise have gone undiagnosed or untreated. The basis of the approach arises from the fact that the majority of the fixated are driven by delusional beliefs based in potentially treatable mental disorders. Treating those with evident mental illness will have an important effect in reducing the level of risk to public figures, whilst at the same time improving the health and welfare of the individuals concerned. The strap-line on FTAC's stationery is 'Preventing Harm and Facilitating Care'.

According to a statement made in June 2007 by the then Minister of State at the Home Office, Tony McNulty,

FTAC does not detain people in psychiatric hospitals. When it encounters an individual in need of mental health care it alerts their general practitioners and psychiatrists, who then provide appropriate help under existing legislation. FTAC may make use of police powers under section 136 of the Mental Health Act 1983 to take a person who appears to be suffering from mental disorder, and in immediate need of care or control, to a place of safety. When people are removed to hospital under section 136, they are examined by a registered medical practitioner and interviewed by an approved social worker, not associated with FTAC, in order to make any necessary arrangements for their treatment or care.

== Activity ==
In a parliamentary reply made in June 2009, the then Minister of State for Security, Counter-Terrorism, Crime and Policing, David Hanson said: "Since 2006, when FTAC began operation, 246 people have been detained under the Mental Health Act following a referral from FTAC and a subsequent decision by local health services. No individual has received a custodial sentence as a result of FTAC involvement."

He also stated that during that same period, 27 people had been conveyed to a "place of safety" by FTAC staff under section 136 of the Mental Health Act 1983.

FTAC published the details of its interventions in its first 100 cases in The Journal of Forensic Psychiatry & Psychology in 2010. Eighty-six per cent of those assessed by FTAC were diagnosed as suffering from psychotic illness; 57% of the sample group were subsequently admitted to hospital, and 26% treated in the community. In 80% of cases, the risk level was reduced to low by FTAC intervention, the remainder of cases remaining under continued FTAC management

In protection terms, FTAC’s activities are said to benefit the families of the fixated individuals and the general public as much as the public figures that they are hounding. This is because those close to the fixated are more regularly exposed to their irrational and threatening behaviour than the public figures they target. This finding is similar to that made in the USA by Dietz and Martell in a report prepared for the National Institute of Justice:

The persons most at risk of violence from the individual mentally ill person who pursues public figures are not the public figures or those that protect them – assuming they have the necessary security arrangements - but rather the private citizens who are the family members and neighbours of the mentally disordered subject.

== Origins ==
The setting up of FTAC was the main recommendation of the report of Fixated Research Group (FRG) which undertook a major research project on behalf of the Home Office between 2003 and 2006. This looked at inappropriate communications and approaches to members of the Royal Family, and systematically examined 8,000 files held by SO14, the royalty protection division of the Metropolitan Police Service’s Protection Command. The Fixated Research Group was composed of forensic psychiatrists and psychologists from the UK, Australia and the USA, who are experts in the field of stalking. They included Paul Mullen and Michele Pathé from Australia, co-authors of ‘Stalkers and their Victims’, and J. Reid Meloy from San Diego, editor of The Psychology of Stalking. The series of research papers published by the group in peer-reviewed scientific journals forms the evidence base for the Fixated Threat Assessment Centre.

== Other applications of the model ==
The researchers at FTAC contend that the joint police-NHS model has other possible applications within the UK, such as in police responses to stalking of ordinary people and in homicide prevention. In their view, a logical further development would be the modification of the role of NHS police-liaison psychiatric nurses, so that they become embedded in police responses at borough or county level in order to perform an enabling role, to the benefit of individual patients and of public protection.

== Awards ==
- FTAC won an Association of Chief Police Officers’ Excellence Award in 2009.

== See also ==
- Protection Command
