= Myeloma Canada =

- Company type: Non-profit
- Founded: 2005
- Key people: Aldo E. Del Col - Co-Founder and Chairman of the Board Board Members: Dr Donna Reece Eric Low Johanne Mullen Ellis Basevitz Cindy Manchulenko
- Website: www.myeloma.ca

Myeloma Canada is the only national non-profit organization uniquely devoted to the Canadian myeloma community. The organization helps myeloma patients and raises awareness about this rare form of cancer.

Founded in 2005 by two myeloma patients, Myeloma Canada is a patient-driven, patient-focused, grassroots organization, whose goal is to:

• Provide educational resources and emotional support to patients, families and caregivers.

• Increase awareness of the disease and its effects on the lives of patients and families.

• Promote clinical research and access to new drug trials in Canada.

• Facilitate access to new therapies, treatment options and health care resources.

Since the organization's inception, Myeloma Canada has made momentous strides in terms of increasing awareness and empowering patients and their caregivers through education for this relatively unknown disease, and serves as an international model for patient advocacy, community engagement and research.

== Mission ==
As a patient-focused organization, Myeloma Canada is committed to improving the quality of life of all Canadians living with myeloma and their families, through education, support, awareness, advocacy and research, and ultimately to finding a cure for multiple myeloma.
