= Warrant card =

Identification card carried by officers

A warrant card is proof of identification and authority carried by police constables and some other law enforcement officials, including immigration officials and Approved Mental Health Professionals. The term is normally used only within the United Kingdom and in current and former Commonwealth countries. Many other countries refer to their equivalent of warrant cards simply as police credentials, commission books, or identification cards. Specially trained mental health practitioners called Approved Mental Health Professional are also warranted council officers and carry warrant cards when acting under the Mental Health Act 1983.

Warrant cards generally include a photograph of the holder as well as the holder's name, rank, warrant number and a holographic emblem to mark authenticity. The warrant number is equivalent to a badge number in other police services; it is a unique identifier unlike a collar number (sometimes displayed on the uniform) which may change when transferring between departments or changing rank. A warrant card is sometimes displayed alongside a badge showing the service to which the officer belongs, but is increasingly commonly displayed on one ID card, with the force coat of arms printed on it.

The text on a warrant card usually indicates that the holder is granted authority by a specific official to perform the functions of the office held, and may also indicate training to a particular level. In the UK, police personnel authorized to carry firearms may have an endorsement on their warrant card to that effect.

== Warrant card holders ==
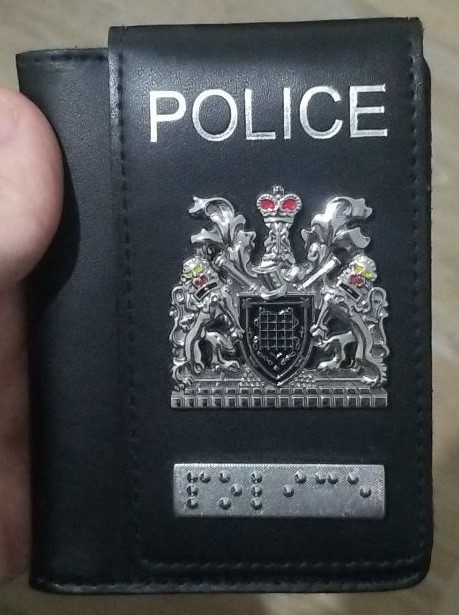
A warrant card holder for the Metropolitan Police.

Most police forces are also supplied with a warrant card holder – a black, leather ID wallet with a leather flap, used to display the badge from a shirt pocket or belt. Usually, the leather flap of the holder is accompanied by the word "POLICE" in silver leaf and an enamel badge of the force arms. Many police forces are also choosing to include a metal braille bar to their warrant card holders, which most commonly reads "POLICE". Officers with special roles (such as a detective) may have their braille bar replaced with a standard metal bar with their rank title inscribed. The Metropolitan Police Service, along with other forces, offer serving officers a special tri-fold edition wallet with their respective arms and braille bar, with two ID slots. This is designed to also hold a force-issued Oyster card.

Neither badge nor wallet denotes authority of police powers; they are adjuncts to the warrant card. Most police forces have identification cards usually held within lanyards, which are required to be worn inside police stations. Some roles do not have a warrant card, or a holder, such as a police community support officer, who are instead issued with PCSO designation cards, which – similarly – certifies that the PCSO is authorised to carry out the duties of their office. Other enforcement agencies also sometimes carry warrant card holders, such as:

- Royal Air Force Police
- Royal Military Police
- Royal Navy Police
- Agents of the National Crime Agency
- Enforcement officers for local government councils
- Enforcement officers for Home Offices departments (Border Force, Immigration Enforcement)

== United Kingdom ==
In the United Kingdom, a warrant card is evidence of a constable's sworn attestation. The power of a constable is in the person and not the warrant card (with the exception of a few services not sworn in by the Police Act 1996 or the Police (Scotland) Act 1967). A constable still holds the power to make an arrest off-duty and without a warrant card. However, force policy usually dictates that police constables in plain clothes are required to identify themselves and produce their warrant card when they are performing their police duties and exercising their police powers, so long as it is practical to do so (for example, not necessarily if the person they are arresting is being violent). Generally, police officers are required to produce their warrant card when requested, even in uniform, but only if it is practical. All types of police are issued warrant cards, as it is proof of attestation. National special police forces are given warrant cards – including the British Transport Police, Civil Nuclear Constabulary, Royal Military Police and Ministry of Defence Police.

=== National Crime Agency ===
The National Crime Agency ensure that all of their investigators are triple-warranted as police officers, customs officers, and immigration officers. Due to the nature of their work regarding national organised crime, it is essential that they are able to exercise certain powers that are beyond that of a regular police officer. For example: being given the powers of customs officers allows them to search or examine any goods imported into the United Kingdom, and place said items into special customs control if need be, under the Finance Act 1994.

=== Special constabulary ===
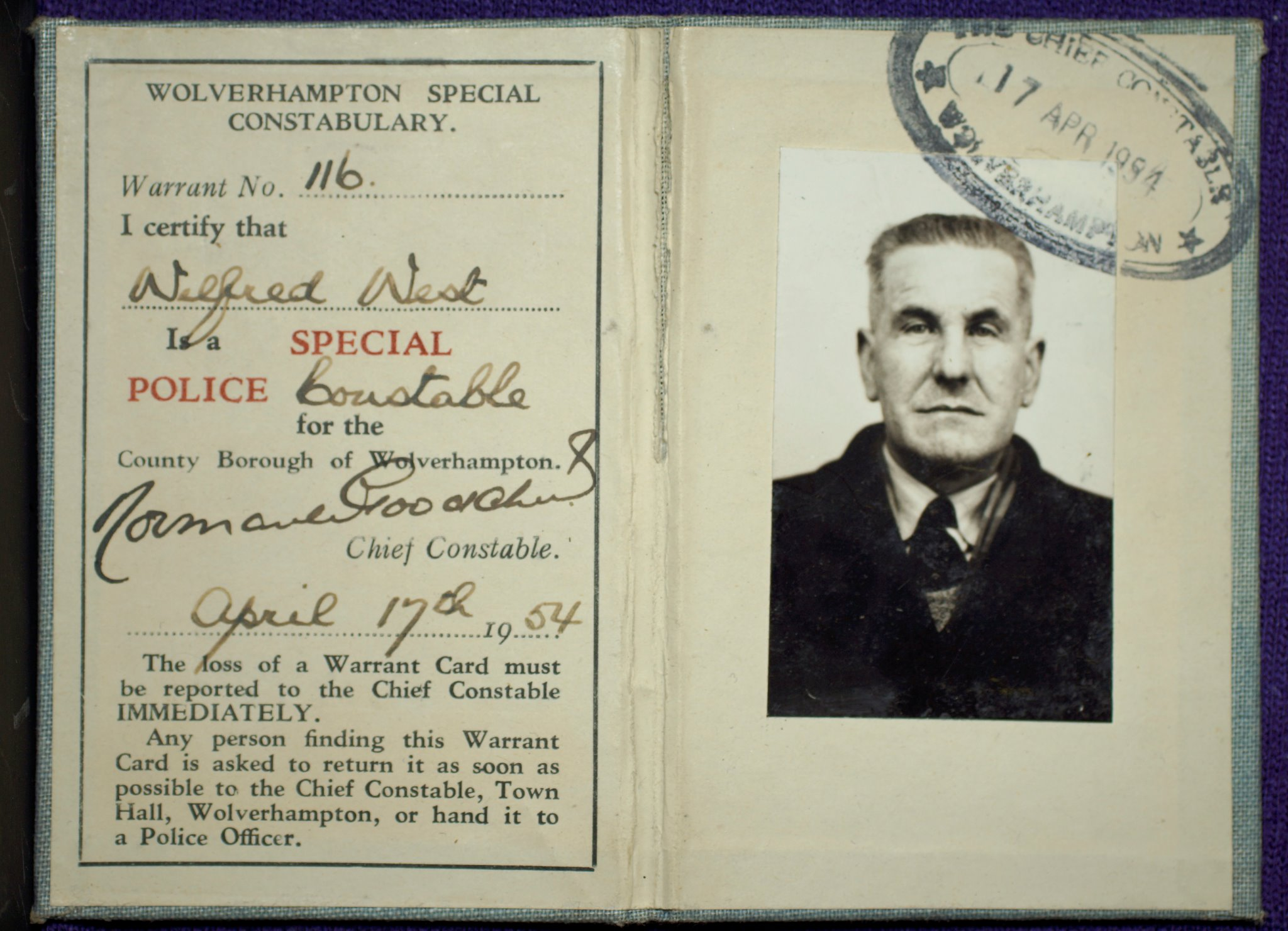
A warrant card issued to a special constable in Wolverhampton in 1954

Special constables are sworn officers as a Crown servant and have the same powers and authority as regular officers. Hence they also carry a warrant card, with the only difference being rank, displayed as "Special Constable" instead of "Constable". Special constables are also able to exercise the powers of the warrant card off duty.

=== Prisoner escort and custody services ===
Prisoner custody officers must wear a photo security pass, issued on behalf of the Ministry of Justice, in order to exercise their powers and duties under the Criminal Justice Act 1991.

== Canada ==
=== Federal ===
Police officers in the Royal Canadian Mounted Police are issued with warrant cards which confirms the bearer as a member in the RCMP and their status as peace officers. Each warrant card is issued in the name of the commissioner serving at the time of engagement.

=== Toronto ===
Toronto Police officers are issued with warrant cards contained within a wallet. When opened the wallet has a metal badge of the force with the officer's identification number, rank and name.

=== Edmonton ===
Edmonton Police Service officers are issued warrant cards, and as of August 2021, are the first police force in Canada to have Braille lettering with the officer's identification number, rank and name.

== Hong Kong ==
=== Customs and Excise ===
C&E issued three types of warrant cards: two are for customs officers and one is for trade control personnel.

Smart warrant cards are written in both Chinese and English. The card is yellow in colour for customs officers and grey for trade control personnel. The front of the card contains the name and rank (and UI for customs officer), along with the photo of the individual. The card is covered with a hologram made up of the logo of C&E.

There are three different versions of the obverse:

- A customs officer who is wearing a uniform. It bears the following text:
  "I hereby certify the person whose name and photograph appear on the obverse of this warrant card is a member of Customs and Excise Service holding an office specified in Schedule 1, Customs and Excise Service Ordinance, Chapter 342, Laws of Hong Kong."
- Plainclothes officer. In addition to the above text, it bears the following:
  "... and is authorised to carry firearms whilst in plain clothes."
- Trades control personnel. It bears the following text:
  "I (Senior Principal Trade Controls Officer) hereby certify that the officer whose name, rank and photograph appear on the obverse side of this warrant card is an authorized officer for the purpose of the Ordinances listed in the Annex to this Warrant Card."

=== Police ===
The HKPF issued warrant cards to its officers under rules from the Police Force Ordnance.

Smart warrant cards have on the front: "Hong Kong Police" (in Chinese and English); the force arms in colour; the name, rank and UI of the warrant card holder; and a photograph. The card is covered with laser-etched "Hong Kong Police" in English and Chinese. On the reverse, the cards bear the statement: "The person whose photograph and particulars appear on the reverse is a duly appointed member of the Hong Kong Police".

Allegedly, a number of Hong Kong Police failed to display their warrant cards during the series of anti-extradition protests. Police later clarified that they were not required to do so, under certain circumstances.

== Singapore ==
In Singapore, police officers also carry their warrant card. The warrant card allows a search to be carried out by the police officer; however, the Volunteer Special Constabulary is not allowed to utilise it when they are off-duty.

The warrant card has security features designed to prevent identity fraud through impersonation as police officers. When the card is tilted at an angle, the holographic word “POLICE” appears below the officer’s photograph, while on the right of the card, a vertical row of five holographic police crests is visible.
