= Flexible working =

Flexible working may refer to:

- Flextime or flexitime
- part-time work
- The United Kingdom's Flexible Working Regulations 2014
- The United Kingdom's Armed Forces (Flexible Working) Act 2018
