= Bruce George Peter Lee =

English serial arsonist (born 1960)

- Born: Peter George Dinsdale; 31 July 1960 (age 66); Manchester, England
- Convictions: Manslaughter; Arson
- Penalty: Indefinite hospital detention

Details
- Victims: 12
- Span of crimes: 1973–1979
- Country: England
- Location: East Riding of Yorkshire
- Date apprehended: 4 December 1979

Peter Tredget (born Peter George Dinsdale; 31 July 1960), formerly Bruce George Peter Lee, is a British serial killer and arsonist. He confessed to a total of 11 acts of arson, pleading guilty to 26 counts of manslaughter. Fourteen of these were overturned in two separate appeals. Lee was sentenced to indefinite secure hospital detention in 1981 and remains detained as of August 2026.

== Biography ==
=== Early life ===
Lee was born as Peter George Dinsdale in Manchester, the son of a sex worker. Lee was brought up in children's homes and suffered from epilepsy and congenital spastic hemiplegia in his right limbs, which left him with a limp in his right leg and a compulsion to hold his right arm across his chest. As an adult, he worked as a labourer and was known locally as "daft Peter". In 1979, his mother remarried a man surnamed Lee. That same year, Dinsdale changed his name by deed poll to Bruce, partly in homage to the actor Bruce Lee. Following a further name change he now goes by Peter Tredget.

=== Selby Street fire ===
On 4 December 1979, a fire broke out at the front of a house on Selby Street, Hull, East Riding of Yorkshire. Inside were Edith Hastie and her sons Thomas (9), Charles (15), Paul (12), and Peter (8). The family was asleep at the time.

Charles rescued his mother by pushing her out of an upstairs window. He could not help his brothers, Paul and Peter, who were in the same bedroom. Opening the bedroom window had caused a draft which fed the fire. All three were trapped and burned severely, and were taken to the specialist burns unit in Pinderfields Hospital in Wakefield, West Yorkshire. Charles died overnight; Peter died two days later and Paul died after surviving for 12 days. Thomas, who had muscular dystrophy, survived, escaping through a window in the back bedroom, where the flames were less severe. Edith Hastie had three daughters, who were staying with relatives elsewhere in the area that particular night. Her husband, Tommy Hastie, was in prison.

The police set up a makeshift incident room in a former police station on Gordon Street and began talking to local people about the fire and the family. They were surprised and shocked by a rather casual response from the neighbourhood regarding the brothers, despite the severity of the fire which led to their deaths. The indifference of the neighbourhood came to a climax at the joint funeral for the boys in January 1980 when a grief-stricken Edith Hastie issued an outburst to the gathering crowd over their lack of sympathy for the loss of her sons. The two boys were buried together in one grave at the Northern Cemetery in Hull.

Once the police had established that the Hasties were known as a "problem" family, responsible for petty crime and vendettas, they began looking for an arsonist who may have been seeking a form of revenge. Lee was one of many teenagers who volunteered to be questioned routinely about the fire. Six months after the inquiry began, he confessed in great detail to pouring paraffin through the letterbox and setting it alight in revenge against Charles Hastie, with whom he had had some sexual contact. Lee said the 15-year-old boy had threatened to go to the police (as he was a minor) unless Lee gave him money. Lee had also become infatuated with Charles' sister Angeleena Hastie but she had rejected his repeated advances.

=== Arrest and investigation ===
On the night the fire at the Hasties' home was started, police received an anonymous telephone call, reporting three people driving away from the direction of the house in a Rover 2000 car. Detective Superintendent Ron Sagar and his investigators traced this car and decided to interview a number of suspects. Sagar accused each of them of starting the fire, hoping that the real killer would then confess.

Lee confessed to the Selby Street fire, saying "I didn't mean to kill them," and told the police how Charlie Hastie had demanded money from him for sexual activities. Moreover, Lee had been ridiculed by members of the Hastie family for falling in love with their daughter, Angeleena Hastie. This was the reason Lee had set the fire at the Hastie's house.

During further questioning, Lee unexpectedly confessed to starting nine more fatal fires in Hull over the previous seven years. None of the fires were treated with suspicion at the time; inquests recorded misadventure verdicts and arson was never considered. A total of 26 people had died in the blazes, ranging from a six-month-old baby, a young mother and her three small sons, to 11 elderly men in a residential home, Wensley Lodge. Dozens more were burned or suffered from smoke inhalation, or received injuries while escaping.

Lee claimed that most of the fires were started at random because he loved fire, and he rarely considered whether he was endangering life when he started them. Only the Hastie fire and two others were at houses owned by people he knew and against whom he bore a grudge.

Investigating officers then proceeded to drive Lee around the city of Hull to the locations he had specified, whereupon Lee then pointed out the buildings in question. Although Lee could not be particular with dates or chronology, research later showed that fires had indeed been started at each of the dwellings he had indicated. Lee said that when he heard of many of the deaths he had caused, he sought solace in the Bible but was not persuaded to stop or confess.

To test Lee's story and rule out any prospect that he was merely a well-informed fantasist, officers deliberately took him to a dwelling where a high-profile fire had occurred but a criminal conviction had already been secured. Lee immediately ruled out his involvement — he said he had never been anywhere near the area — leading police to believe that he was being truthful about the number of fires he had started.

Despite initially saying he was not sorry for the deaths he caused, as killing was not on his mind when he began the majority of the fires, Lee later offered apologies for his actions while awaiting trial.

== Conviction and sentence ==
On 20 January 1981, Lee pleaded not guilty at Leeds Crown Court to 26 counts of murder, but guilty to 26 counts of manslaughter on the grounds of diminished responsibility, and to 11 counts of arson. Prosecutors accepted the guilty pleas, saying that it was not in the public interest to incur the expense of a trial.

He had also confessed to an additional ten nonfatal fires, set in locations including shops and warehouses; he was not charged for those incidents.

Lee was initially taken to Park Lane Special Hospital in Liverpool and was later transferred to Rampton Secure Hospital. Although he had been convicted of more deaths than any previous killer in British history, Lee received relatively little national publicity, possibly because he was convicted of manslaughter rather than murder, and also because the trial of Peter Sutcliffe, which was a much more high-profile case, was ongoing at the same time.

In 1983, a public inquiry concluded that the fire at the Wensley Lodge was accidental and that Lee was not responsible for it or the deaths of the eleven residents. Senior fire investigation officers supported the inquiry's conclusions. Lee's eleven relevant manslaughter convictions were later duly quashed on appeal. Tredget has recanted his confessions, consistently claiming his innocence since the late 1980s.

A new appeal was launched in 2021 following a referral from the Criminal Cases Review Commission, arguing due to his physical disabilities he could not have committed the crimes and had falsely confessed due to the state of his mental health. The Court of Appeal ruled in 2022 that Tredget could not have been responsible for two fires, acquitting him of two counts of arson and three of manslaughter; the remaining convictions were upheld.

== Aftermath ==
Sagar, the detective in charge of Lee's case, later launched a libel action against The Sunday Times after it published articles suggesting Lee's statements had not been entirely voluntary. The judge at Lee's 1983 appeal stated that he was confident that Lee's statements were "freely given" and the paper later withdrew the allegations and offered an apology, with the case finally settling out of court in 1987. Sagar, who had retired and was made an MBE, had stated that he hoped Lee would one day be deemed fit and safe enough to be freed. Sagar died in March 2010.

== See also ==
- List of serial killers in the United Kingdom
- List of serial killers by number of victims

== Sources ==
- Sagar, Ron (1999). Hull: Hell and Fire. Highgate. ISBN 1-902645-06-5.
- The Daily Mail (Hull) — 5 December 1979 – 31 January 1981, 11 February 1981, 10 December 1983.
- The Sunday Times — 26 January 1981, 14 March 1982, 21 March 1982, 18 July 1982, 20 March 1983, 11 December 1983
- "Peter Dinsdale guilty of Hull arson attacks". British Universities Film & Video Council.
