= Juries Act 1974 =

Act of the Parliament of the United Kingdom

Juries Act 1974 (Note: Section 23(1).)
- Act of Parliament
- Parliament of the United Kingdom
- Long title: An Act to consolidate certain enactments relating to juries, jurors and jury service with corrections and improvements made under the Consolidation of Enactments (Procedure) Act 1949.
- Citation: 1974 c. 23
- Territorial extent: England and Wales (Note: Section 23(4).)

Dates
- Royal assent: 9 July 1974
- Commencement: 9 August 1974 (Note: Section 23(3).)

Other legislation
- Amends: See § Repealed enactments
- Repeals/revokes: See § Repealed enactments
- Amended by: Social Security (Consequential Provisions) Act 1975; Administration of Justice Act 1977; Armed Forces Act 1981; Administration of Justice Act 1982; Criminal Justice Act 1982; Representation of the People Act 1983; Representation of the People Regulations 1986; Criminal Justice Act 1988; Coroners Act 1988; Probation Service Act 1993; Criminal Justice and Public Order Act 1994; Criminal Justice Act 2003; Domestic Violence, Crime and Victims Act 2004; Constitutional Reform Act 2005; Mental Capacity Act 2005; Electoral Administration Act 2006; Armed Forces Act 2006; Mental Health Act 2007; Coroners and Justice Act 2009; Armed Forces Act 2006 (Transitional Provisions etc) Order 2009; Mental Health (Discrimination) Act 2013; Crime and Courts Act 2013; Criminal Justice and Courts Act 2015; Armed Forces (Flexible Working) Act 2018; Sentencing Act 2020; Police, Crime, Sentencing and Courts Act 2022
- Relates to: Consolidation of Enactments (Procedure) Act 1949

Status: Amended

Text of statute as originally enacted

Revised text of statute as amended

Text of the Juries Act 1974 as in force today (including any amendments) within the United Kingdom, from legislation.gov.uk.

The Juries Act 1974 (c. 23) is an act of the Parliament of the United Kingdom. According to its long title, the purpose of the act is "to consolidate certain enactments relating to juries, jurors and jury service with corrections and improvements made under the Consolidation of Enactments (Procedure) Act 1949." Among others, the act states who is eligible for jury service in England and Wales, who is disqualified, and who may be excused.

== Provisions ==
Under the provisions of the act, any individual is qualified to serve as a juror or be called upon for jury duty in the Crown Court, High Court or county courts if:

1. they are registered as a parliamentary or local government elector,
2. they are between the ages of 18 and 75,
3. they have been ordinarily resident in the United Kingdom, the Channel Islands or the Isle of Man for any period of at least five years since the age of 13, and
4. they are not otherwise ineligible or disqualified.

=== Eligibility and excusal ===
A person is liable for jury service if that person:

- is registered to vote in parliamentary or local elections
- is aged between 18 and 75 inclusive
- has been resident in the United Kingdom, the Channel Islands or the Isle of Man for a period of at least five years since the age of 13;
- is not disqualified.

The following persons are disqualified from jury service:

- A person subject to one of various orders under the Mental Health Act 1983
- A person who lacks mental capacity, as defined by the Mental Capacity Act 2005
- A person who is on bail in criminal proceedings
- A person who has ever been given a prison sentence of at least five years, or an indefinite sentence
- A person who has been convicted of one of several offences relating to their conduct as a juror or member of a court martial in the last ten years
- A person who has been lawfully imprisoned, or subjected to a suspended prison sentence or one of various types of community order, in the United Kingdom, the Channel Islands or the Isle of Man in the last ten years.

A person who has served on a jury, other than in a coroner's court, within the last two years is entitled to be excused. The court also has power to excuse any person who has good reason to be excused, in particular a serving member of the armed forces whose commanding officer certifies that it would be prejudicial to the efficiency of the service for them to be absent from duty. Service may be deferred rather than excused at the court's discretion.

==== Disqualification before 2004 ====
Until the coming into force of Schedule 33 of the Criminal Justice Act 2003 on 5 April 2004, the following were disqualified:

- The judiciary
- Those concerned with administration of justice, e.g. police officers, solicitors, barristers, forensic scientists or prison wardens
- The clergy, e.g. men in holy orders or regular ministers of any religious denomination
- Mentally ill persons subject to various orders
- Certain persons subject to imprisonment or probation

Additionally, the following persons could be excused from jury service as of right:

- Those aged 76 or over
- Members and officers of the Houses of Parliament
- Members of the Scottish Parliament and the Scottish Executive
- Members of the Welsh Assembly
- Members of the European Parliament
- The Auditors General for Wales and Scotland
- Full-time serving members of the naval, military or air forces
- Members of the medical profession, e.g. registered and practising doctors, nurses, dentists or vets
- Members of religious orders whose beliefs are incompatible with jury service
- Those who have previously served on a jury within the past two years

The act also states that personation of a juror may result in the trial in which the juror sat being voided; but other irregularities will not, unless the irregularity was objected to as soon as practicable.

=== Majority verdicts ===
Section 17 of the act re-enacts with modifications the provisions of section 13 of the Criminal Justice Act 1967, allowing majority verdicts in England and Wales.

In the Crown Court or High Court, one juror may dissent without resulting in a hung jury if the jury consists of at least ten persons, or two if there are at least eleven.

In the county court, where there are eight on a jury, at least seven must agree.

=== Repealed enactments ===
Section 22(4) of the act repealed 9 enactments, listed in the schedule 3 to the act.

| Citation | Short title | Extent of repeal |
|---|---|---|
| 33 & 34 Vict. c. 77 | Juries Act 1870 | The whole act. |
| 11 & 12 Geo. 6. c. 58 | Criminal Justice Act 1948 | Section 35. |
| 12 & 13 Geo. 6. c. 27 | Juries Act 1949 | Part I. |
| 12 & 13 Geo. 6. c. 27 | Juries Act 1949 | Section 35(2). |
| 7 & 8 Eliz. 2. c. 22 | County Courts Act 1959 | Section 96(2). |
| 1965 c. 26 | Criminal Justice Act 1965 | The whole act. |
| 1967 c. 80 | Criminal Justice Act 1967 | Section 13. |
| 1971 c. 23 | Courts Act 1971 | Part V. |
| 1971 c. 23 | Courts Act 1971 | Schedule 4. |
| 1972 c. 71 | Criminal Justice Act 1972 | Part II. |
| 1972 c. 71 | Criminal Justice Act 1972 | Schedule 2. |
| 1972 c. 71 | Criminal Justice Act 1972 | In Schedule 5, the entries relating to the Courts Act 1971. |
| 1973 c. 62 | Powers of Criminal Courts Act 1973 | In Schedule 5, paragraph 48. |

== See also ==
- Juries Act
