= Patient advocacy =

Advocacy for patients, survivors, and caregivers

Patient advocacy is a process in health care concerned with advocacy for patients, survivors, and caregivers. The patient advocate may be an individual or an organization, concerned with healthcare standards or with one specific group of disorders. The terms patient advocate and patient advocacy can refer both to individual advocates providing services that organizations also provide, and to organizations whose functions extend to individual patients. Some patient advocates are independent (with no conflict-of-loyalty issues) and some work for the organizations that are directly responsible for the patient's care.

Typical advocacy activities are the following: safeguarding patients from errors, incompetence and misconduct; patient rights, matters of privacy, confidentiality or informed consent, patient representation, awareness-building, support and education of patients, survivors and their carers.

Nurses can perform a de facto role of patient advocacy, though this role may be limited and conflicted due their employment within an organization. Patients can advocate for themselves through self-advocacy and the ability for this self-advocacy can be learnt or improved through training.

== History ==
Patient advocacy, as a hospital-based practice, grew out of this patient rights movement: patient advocates (often called patient representatives) were needed to protect and enhance the rights of patients at a time when hospital stays were long and acute conditions—heart disease, stroke and cancer—contributed to the boom in hospital growth. Health care reformers at the time critiqued this growth by quoting Roemer's law: a built hospital bed is a bed likely to be filled. And more radical health analysts coined the term health empires to refer to the increasing power of these large teaching institutions that linked hospital care with medical education, putting one in the service of the other, arguably losing the patient-centered focus in the process. It was not surprising, then, that patient advocacy, like patient care, focused on the hospital stay, while health advocacy took a more critical perspective of a health care system in which power was concentrated on the top in large medical teaching centers and a dominance of the medical profession.

Patient advocacy in the United States emerged in the 1950s in the context of cancer research and treatment. In those early days of cancer treatment, patients and their families raised ethical concerns around the tests, treatment practices, and clinical research being conducted. For instance, they expressed concern to the National Institute of Health (NIH) about the cruelty of the repeated collection of blood samples (for blood marrow examination) and raised questions about whether this was more harmful than beneficial to the patient. Sidney Farber, a Harvard physician and cancer researcher, coined the term total care, to describe the treatment of children with leukemia. Under total care, a physician "treated the family as a whole, factoring in its psychosocial and economic needs", rather than focusing purely on physical health concerns. Previous researchers had dealt with concerns raised by families, because physicians emphasized patient physical health rather than the inclusion of bedside manners with the families. The practice of patient advocacy emerged to support and represent patients in this medico-legal and ethical discussion.

The 1970s were also an important time in the US for patient advocacy as the Patient Rights movement grew. As a major advocacy organization during the time, the National Welfare Rights Organization's (NWRO) materials for a patient's bill of rights influenced many additional organizations and writings, including hospital accreditation standards for the Joint Commission in 1970 and the American Hospital Association's Patient Bill of Rights in 1972. The utilization of advocates by individual patients gained momentum in the early 2000s in the US, and Australia 10 years later, and the profession is now perceived as a mainstream option to optimize outcomes in both hospital- and community-based healthcare.

== Self-advocacy ==
Communication skills, information-seeking skills and problem-solving skills were found to correlate with measures of a patient's ability to advocate for themselves. Conceptualizations of the qualities have defined self-knowledge, communication skills, knowledge of rights, and leadership as components of advocacy.

Self-advocacy has also been associated with improved outcomes in healthcare experiences. Research indicates patient satisfaction is positively linked to self-advocacy, behaviors such as illness education, assertive communication with healthcare professionals, and mindful nonadherence. These behaviors are associated with greater participation in care, engaging with discussions about treatment options, and seeking relevant care information. Self-compassion has also been linked as a contributor to this relationship by supporting the patients’ ability to seek healthcare interactions and cope with the challenges related to the illness.

Studies have found that patients and healthcare providers recognize the benefits of self-advocacy, like improvement in disease management, better decision-making in patients, and effective communication. However, differences in perspectives and potential drawbacks have been reported, particularly in relation to how self-advocacy can affect the patient-provider interaction and the dynamics of clinical encounters.

A number of interventions have been tried to improve patients' effectiveness at advocating for themselves. Studies have found peer-led programs where an individual with a condition is taught interview skills were effective in improving self-advocacy. Writing interventions, where people with conditions received training and practiced writing essays advocating for themselves, were shown to improve self-advocacy.

== Patient advocacy processes ==
At a conceptual level patient advocacy consists of three processes: valuing, apprising and interceding. Valuing consists of understanding the patient's unique attributes and desires. Apprising consists of informing the patient and advising the patient. Interceding consists of interacting with processes to ensure that the patient's unique attributes and desires are represented in these processes, and may include interceding in family interactions as well as healthcare processes.

Examples of patient advocacy include:

- Educating and walking patients through the management of their disease or chronic illnesses. The social determinants of health can vary significantly from patient to patient. It is the role of the patient advocate to cater to the patient's needs and assist with these factors, such as where to find treatment to manage their illness, assisting with healthcare access due to socioeconomic barriers, or helping find additional health services. Assistance with the management of their illnesses or disease can also include assisting with cooperative purchases of health care materials.
- Support with sourcing and navigating second opinions where patients seek input about diagnosis, treatment options and prognosis.
- Establishing a network of contacts. Examples of contacts patient advocates can assist in connecting patients to include: in the public sector (political and regulatory), in public and private health insurance, in the sector of medical service providers, with medical practitioners, and with pharmaceutical and medical research to provide patients with help in the care and management of their diseases.
- Providing emotional support in dealing with their health concerns, illnesses, or chronic conditions. According to the National Institute of Mental Health, individuals with chronic illnesses are at a higher risk of depression of than patients with other mental health conditions. When managing their illnesses, patients and survivors experience the direct effect of the consequences their disease has on their quality of life, and may also go through difficult phases of adaptation of their daily routine and lifestyle to accommodate the disease. Part of the role of patient advocates can include providing emotional support for patients or connecting them to mental health resources.
- Attending appointments with a patient. Patients can find doctor's appointments intimidating, but also difficult to understand. Issues may stem from differences in language proficiency, educational background, or background in health literacy. A patient advocate's presence can ensure that patient's concerns are highlighted and adequately addressed by physicians. Patient advocates may also be responsible for assisting with scheduling additional appointments as well.
- Assisting with health insurance and other financial aspects of healthcare. The Institute of Medicine in the United States says fragmentation of the U.S. health care delivery and financing system is a barrier to accessing care. Within the financing system, health insurance plays a significant role. According to a United Health survey, only 9% of Americans surveyed understood health insurance terms, which presents a significant issue for patients, given the importance of health insurance in terms of providing access to healthcare. The patient advocate may help with researching or choosing health insurance plans.

== Nurse advocacy ==
The American Nurses Association (ANA) includes advocacy in its definition of nursing:

Nursing is the protection, promotion, and optimization of health and abilities, prevention of illness and injury, facilitation of healing, alleviation of suffering through the diagnosis and treatment of human response, and advocacy in the care of individuals, families, groups, communities, and populations.

Advocacy in nursing finds its theoretical basis in nursing ethics. For instance, the ANA's Code of Ethics for Nurses includes language relating to patient advocacy:

- The nurse's primary commitment is to the patient, whether an individual, family, group, or community.
- The nurse promotes, advocates for, and strives to protect the health, safety, and rights of the patient.

Several factors can lead a patient to use nurses for advocacy, including impairments in their ability to express wishes due to speech impairments or limited consciousness, lack of independence due to illiteracy, sociocultural weakness, or separation from friends or family caused by hospitalization. Nurses are more able to advocate if they are independent, professionally committed, and have self-confidence as well as having legal and professional knowledge, as well as knowing a patient's wishes. The act of patient advocacy improved nurses' sense of professional well-being and self-concept, job motivation and job satisfaction, and enhances the public image of nurses; however, advocating for a patient could have social and professional consequences.

Conflict of interest between a nurse's responsibilities to their employer and their responsibilities to the patient can be a barrier to advocacy. Additionally, a nurse is concerned about all of the patients they care for rather any individual patient. Gadow and Curtis argue that the role of patient advocacy in nursing is to facilitate a patient's informed consent through decision-making, but in mental health nursing there is a conflict between the patient's right to autonomy and nurses' legal and professional duty to protect the patient and the community from harm, since patients may experience delusions or confusion which affect their decision-making. In such instances, the nurse may engage in persuasion and negotiation in order to prevent the risk that they perceive. Some barriers to nursing advocacy can be identified in organizational and institutional contexts. These barriers may include limited support from management, hierarchical structures within the healthcare systems, and perceived professional risks from challenging authority. These constraints have led to the concept of limited advocacy, which lets nurses advocate for patients within certain boundaries imposed by their own work environment.

Advocacy in nursing has also been described as a process linked with clinical practice rather than a single action. This may involve assessing patients' needs, providing guidance, answering concerns, and protecting the patient within healthcare settings. This process has been characterized as “voicing responsiveness,” in which nurses actively answer and express to patients’ needs and preferences as part of their responsibilities.Research has also found a relationship between patient advocacy behaviors and nurses’ professional values, suggesting that advocacy may be closely linked to ethical and professional identity of the nurses.

== Private advocacy ==
Private advocates (also known as independent patient/health/health care advocates) often work parallel to the advocates that work for hospitals. As global healthcare systems started to become more complex, and as the role of the cost of care continues to place more of a burden on patients, a new profession of private professional advocacy began to take root in the mid-2000s. At that time, two organizations were founded to support the work of these new private practitioners, professional patient advocates. The National Association of Healthcare Advocacy Consultants was started to provide broad support for advocacy. The Alliance of Professional Health Advocates was started to support the business of being a private advocate. Some regions require that those detained for the treatment of mental health disorders are given access to independent mental health advocates who are not involved in the patient's treatment.

Proponents of private advocacy, such as Australian advocate Dorothy Kamaker and L. Bradley Schwartz, have noted that the patient advocates employed by healthcare facilities frequently have an inherent conflict of interest in situations where the needs of an individual patient are at odds with the corporate interests of an advocate's employer. Kamaker argues that hiring a private advocate eliminates this conflict because the private advocate "…has only one master and very clear priorities."

Kamaker founded patientadvocates.com.au in 2013 and, in partnership with Alicia Dunn, followed with disabilityhealthsupport.com.au in 2021 when research revealed that vulnerable groups achieved sub-optimal outcomes and encountered barriers and prejudice in the mainstream health and hospital systems in Australia. "Based on the limited data available, we know that the overall health of people with disabilities is much worse than that of the general population", with "people with disabilities rarely identified as a priority population group in public health policy and practice". Patients supported by advocates have been shown to experience fewer treatment errors and require fewer readmissions post discharge. In Australia there has been some movement by private health insurers to engage private patient advocates to reduce costs, improve outcomes and expedite return to work for employees.

Schwartz is the founder and president of GNANOW.org, where he states, "Everyone employed by a health care company is limited to what they can accomplish for patients and families. Hospital-employed patient advocates, navigators, social workers, and discharge planners are no different. They became health care professionals because they are passionate about helping people. But they have heavy caseloads and many work long hours with limited resources. Independent Patient Advocates work one-on-one with patients and loved ones to explore options, improve communication, and coordinate with overworked hospital staff. In fact, many Independent Patient Advocates used to work for hospitals and health care companies before they decided to work directly for patients."

== Patient advocacy organizations ==
Patient advocacy organizations, PAO, or patient advocacy groups are organizations that exist to represent the interests of people with a particular disease. Patient advocacy organizations may fund research and influence national health policy through lobbying. Examples in the US include the American Cancer Society, American Heart Association, and National Organization for Rare Disorders.

Some patient advocacy groups receive donations from pharmaceutical companies. In the US in 2015, 14 companies donated $116 million to patient advocacy groups. A database identifying more than 1,200 patient groups showed that six pharmaceutical companies contributed $1 million or more in 2015 to individual groups representing patients who use their drugs, and 594 groups in the database received donations from pharmaceutical companies. Fifteen patient groups relied on pharmaceutical companies for at least 20 percent of their revenue in the same year, and some received more than half of their revenue from pharmaceutical companies. Recipients of donations from pharmaceutical companies include the American Diabetes Association, Susan G. Komen, and the Caring Ambassadors Program.

Patient opinion leaders, also sometimes called patient advocates, are individuals who are well versed in a disease, either as patients themselves or as caretakers, and share their knowledge on the particular disease with others. Such POLs can have an influence on health care providers and may help persuade them to use evidence-based therapies or medications in the management of other patients. Identifying such people and persuading them is one goal of market access groups at pharmaceutical and medical device companies.

One problem with patient advocacy organizations is the difficulty of fairly representing the views of all patients. Individual and organizational advocates are self-appointed, rather than being democratically elected. They frequently engage in partial representation, or the promotion of the needs or views held by a subset of affected people while claiming to represent the whole group. For example, an individual patient advocacy organization may, consciously or otherwise, prioritize the needs of people with the most disabling symptoms, or it may prioritize the needs of those with milder experiences. Patient advocacy organizations can attempt to remediate this situation by making smaller, more general claims or to identify the relevant subgroup (e.g., "long-term survivors" or "newly diagnosed people").

Descriptive representation (the belief that only fellow patients can be appropriate representatives) can improve representation of patient interests. However, there are some difficulties with this. It is not feasible in some instances (e.g., if the disease is universally fatal in early childhood). It can be difficult to identify which characteristics should be elevated (e.g., disability or poverty?). Descriptive representation is particularly valued by groups that have experienced institutionalized discrimination. For example, users of psychiatric services may prefer an organization led by another user of psychiatric services instead of one led by a psychiatrist.

== Organizations ==
=== Professional groups ===
Solace
Solace is an American professional organization where private advocates can list their business and allow consumers to book conversations with advocates directly.
Alliance of Professional Health Advocates
The Alliance of Professional Health Advocates (APHA) is an international membership organization for private, professional patient advocates, and those who are exploring the possibility of becoming private advocates. It provides business support such as legal, insurance and marketing. It also offers a public directory of member advocates called AdvoConnection. Following the 2011 death of Ken Schueler — a charter member of the APHA, described as "the Father of Private Patient Advocacy" — the organization established the H. Kenneth Schueler Patient Advocacy Compass Award. The award recognizes excellence in private practice including the use of best practices, community outreach, support of the profession and professional ethics.
Dialysis Patient Citizens
Dialysis Patient Citizens is an American patient-led, non-profit organization dedicated to improving dialysis citizens' quality of life by advocating for favorable public policy. One of DPC's goals is to provide dialysis patients with the education, access and confidence to be their own advocates. Through their grassroots advocacy campaigns, Patient Ambassador program; Washington, D.C. patient fly-ins; conference calls and briefings, DPC works to train effective advocates for dialysis-related issues. Membership is free.
National Association of Healthcare Advocacy Consultants
National Association of Healthcare Advocacy Consultants (NAHAC) is an American nonprofit organization located in Berkeley, California. Joanna Smith founded NAHAC on July 15, 2009, as a broad-based, grassroots organization for health care and patient advocacy. To that end, it is a multi-stakeholder organization, with membership open to the general public.
National Patient Advocate Foundation
The National Patient Advocate Foundation is a non-profit organization in the United States dedicated to "...improving access to, and reimbursement for, high-quality healthcare through regulatory and legislative reform at the state and federal levels." The National Patient Advocate Foundation was founded simultaneously with the non-profit Patient Advocate Foundation, "...which provides professional case management services to Americans with chronic, life-threatening and debilitating illnesses."
Patient Advocates Australia
Patient Advocates Australia, founded by Dorothy Kamaker, is a support option for consumers of aged, health and disability care in Australia. For the elderly, an emerging need has arisen for patient advocacy in residential aged facilities. The Aged Care Royal Commission Report published in 2021 has made recommendations regarding a need for vigilant advocacy for residents of nursing homes to protect them against rampant abuse and neglect, with one submission calling for the routine provision of independent patient advocates. For the disabled, funding for support to overcome healthcare barriers is available through the National Disability Insurance Scheme.
Greater National Advocates (GNA)
Greater National Advocates is a non-profit organization with the goal of raising Americans' awareness of the lifesaving benefits of independent patient advocacy and to provide patients and loved ones with immediate online access to a trusted network of qualified practitioners. GNA uses fact-based media to spread awareness and steer patients and their loved ones to GNANOW.org where they can learn more and find the professional support they need.

=== Center for Patient Partnerships ===
Founded in 2000, the interprofessional Center for Patient Partnerships (CPP) at University of Wisconsin–Madison offers a health advocacy certificate with a focus on either patient advocacy or system-level health policy advocacy. The chapter "Educating for Health Advocacy in Settings of Higher Education" in Patient Advocacy for Health Care Quality: Strategies for Achieving Patient-Centered Care describes CPP's pedagogy and curriculum.

=== Government agencies ===
==== United States ====
In the United States, state governmental units have established ombudsmen to investigate and respond to patient complaints and to provide other consumer services.

New York
In New York, the Office of Patient Advocacy within the New York State Office of Alcoholism and Substance Abuse Services (OASAS) is responsible for protecting the rights of patients in OASAS-certified programs. The office answers questions from patients and their families; provides guidance for health care professionals on topics related to patient rights, state regulations, and treatment standards, and intervenes to resolve problems that cannot be handled within treatment programs themselves.
California
In California, the Office of the Patient Advocate (OPA), an independent state office established in July 2000 in conjunction with the Department of Managed Health Care, is responsible for the creation and distribution of educational materials for consumers, public outreach, evaluation and ranking of health care service plans, collaboration with patient assistance programs, and policy development for government health regulation.

Such state government offices may also be responsible for intervening in disputes within the legal and insurance systems and in disciplinary actions against health care professionals. Some hospitals, health insurance companies, and other health care organizations also employ people specifically to assume the role of patient advocate. Within hospitals, the person may have the title of ombudsman or patient representative.

== See also ==
- Geriatric care management
- Ombudsman
- Organizational ombudsman
- Patient empowerment
- Ageing Without Children
