= Mental Health (Discrimination) Act 2013 =

Act of the Parliament of the United Kingdom

Mental Health (Discrimination) Act 2013 (Note: Section 4(5).)
- Act of Parliament
- Parliament of the United Kingdom
- Long title: An Act to make further provision about discrimination against people on the grounds of their mental health.
- Citation: 2013 c. 8
- Introduced by: Gavin Barwell MP (Commons); Lord Stevenson of Coddenham (Lords)
- Territorial extent: United Kingdom (Note: Section 4(4).)

Dates
- Royal assent: 28 February 2013
- Commencement: 28 April 2013 (sections 1 and 3) (Note: Section 4(1).); 15 July 2013 (rest of act) (Note: Section 4(2). The Mental Health (Discrimination) Act 2013 (Commencement) Order 2013.)
Other legislation
Amends	Juries Act 1974; Scotland Act 1998; Government of Wales Act 1998; Mental Health Act 2007
Relates to	Mental Health Act 1983

Status: Amended

History of passage through Parliament

Text of statute as originally enacted

Revised text of statute as amended

The Mental Health (Discrimination) Act 2013 (c. 8) is an act of the Parliament of the United Kingdom introduced to the House of Commons by Gavin Barwell, the Conservative Member of Parliament (MP) for Croydon Central. It was introduced into Parliament as the Mental Health (Discrimination) (No. 2) Bill.

== Legislative passage ==
The bill passed its House of Commons second reading on 14 September 2012.

== Provisions ==
There are four sections of the act.

Section 1 ("Members of Parliament etc") removes from the Mental Health Act 1983 the provision that disqualifies from the House of Commons a member sectioned for over six months under that Act. Section 2 ("Jurors") qualifies the restrictions of jury members who are receiving mental health treatment. Section 3 ("Company directors") modifies regulations in relation to the employment of director's appointments. The final section gives the Secretary of State power to determine when the section relating to juries takes effect; the other provisions came into force with royal assent.

== Other developments ==
At the same time as the legislation was being passed the Commons Members Estimate Committee approved funding for mental health services to be provided for members of Parliament.

== Reception ==
The then Leader of the Opposition, Ed Miliband, said the bill would bring public understanding of mental health "into the 21st century". The Government supported the legislation.
