= Hull: Hell and Fire =

1999 book by Ronald Sagar

- Author: Ronald Sagar
- Genre: Non-fiction crime
- Publisher: Highgate Publications
- Publication date: 1999
- Pages: 192
- ISBN: 1-90-264506-5
- OCLC: 43634760

Hull: Hell and Fire is an account of the arson investigations which led to the arrest of Bruce George Peter Lee. It was written by Ronald Sagar, one of the police officers on the case. The book was written in English and numbers 198 pages. It was published by Highgate Publications.
