= Coroners Act 1988 =

Act of the Parliament of the United Kingdom

Coroners Act 1988 (Note: Section 37(1).)
- Act of Parliament
- Parliament of the United Kingdom
- Long title: An Act to consolidate the Coroners Acts 1887 to 1980 and certain related enactments, with amendments to give effect to recommendations of the Law Commission.
- Citation: 1988 c. 13
- Territorial extent: England and Wales (Note: Section 37(3).)

Dates
- Royal assent: 10 May 1988
- Commencement: 10 July 1988 (Note: Section 37(2).)
- Repealed: 25 July 2013 (Note: The Coroners and Justice Act 2009 (Commencement No. 15, Consequential and Transitory Provisions) Order 2013 (SI 2013/1869).)

Other legislation
- Amends: Pensions (Increase) Act 1971; Juries Act 1974; See § Repealed enactments
- Repeals/revokes: See § Repealed enactments
- Amended by: Treasure Act 1996; Domestic Violence, Crime and Victims Act 2004; Human Tissue Act 2004; Domestic Violence, Crime and Victims (Amendment) Act 2012
- Repealed by: Coroners and Justice Act 2009

Status: Repealed

Text of statute as originally enacted

Revised text of statute as amended

The Coroners Act 1988 (c. 13) was an act of the Parliament of the United Kingdom that consolidated for England and Wales enactments relating to coroners.

The act was broadly based on the Coroners Act 1887 (50 & 51 Vict. c. 71).

== Provisions ==
=== Repealed enactments ===
Section 36(2) of the act repealed 20 enactments and 2 instruments, listed in schedule 4 to the act.

Enactments repealed by section 36(2)
Citation	Short title	Extent of repeal
7 & 8 Vict. c. 92	Coroners Act 1844	The whole act.
36 & 37 Vict. c. 76	Railway Regulation Act (Returns of Signal Arrangements, Workings &c.) 1873	The whole act.
45 & 46 Vict. c. 50	Municipal Corporations Act 1882	Section 248(2).
45 & 46 Vict. c. 50	Municipal Corporations Act 1882	Section 255.
50 & 51 Vict. c. 71	Coroners Act 1887	The whole act.
55 & 56 Vict. c. 56	Coroners Act 1892	The whole act.
16 & 17 Geo. 5. c. 59	Coroners (Amendment) Act 1926	The whole act.
1 & 2 Eliz. 2. c. 20	Births and Deaths Registration Act 1953	Section 23(1).
2 & 3 Eliz. 2. c. 31	Coroners Act 1954	The whole act.
1967 c. 80	Criminal Justice Act 1967	In Schedule 6, paragraph 3.
1972 c. 20	Road Traffic Act 1972	Section 28.
1972 c. 70	Local Government Act 1972	Section 220.
1974 c. 23	Juries Act 1974	Schedule 2.
1974 c. 37	Health and Safety at Work etc. Act 1974	In Schedule 9, paragraph 1.
1977 c. 38	Administration of Justice Act 1977	In Schedule 2, paragraph 1.
1977 c. 45	Criminal Law Act 1977	Section 56.
1977 c. 45	Criminal Law Act 1977	Schedule 10.
SI 1978/374	Social Security (Modification of Coroners (Amendment) Act 1926) Order 1978	The whole order.
SI 1978/1844	Isles of Scilly Order 1978	In the Schedule, the entry relating to section 220 of the Local Government Act 1972.
1980 c. 38	Coroners Act 1980	The whole act.
1980 c. 43	Magistrates' Courts Act 1980	In Schedule 6A, the entry relating to the Coroners Act 1887.
1982 c. 53	Administration of Justice Act 1982	Section 62.
1983 c. 31	Coroners' Juries Act 1983	The whole act.
1985 c. 51	Local Government Act 1985	Section 13.

== Subsequent developments ==
The whole act was repealed by section 178 of, and schedule 23 to, the Coroners and Justice Act 2009, which came into force on 25 July 2013.
