= Armed Forces (Flexible Working) Act 2018 =

Act of the Parliament of the United Kingdom

Armed Forces (Flexible Working) Act 2018 (Note: Section 3(1).)
- Act of Parliament
- Parliament of the United Kingdom
- Long title: An Act to make provision for members of the Regular Forces to serve part-time or subject to geographic restrictions.
- Citation: 2018 c. 2
- Introduced by: Michael Fallon MP, Secretary of State for Defence (Commons); Earl Howe (Lords)
- Territorial extent: England and Wales; Scotland; Northern Ireland; Isle of Man; (Note: Section 3(5)–(8).)

Dates
- Royal assent: 8 February 2018
- Commencement: 8 February 2018 (section 3) (Note: Section 3(2).); 30 June 2018 (sections 1 and 2) (Note: Section 3(3). The Armed Forces (Flexible Working) Act 2018 (Commencement) Regulations 2018.)
Other legislation
Amends	Juries Act 1974; Law Reform (Miscellaneous Provisions) (Scotland) Act 1980; Armed Forces Act 2006

Status: Current legislation

History of passage through Parliament

Text of statute as originally enacted

Revised text of statute as amended

The Armed Forces (Flexible Working) Act 2018 (c. 2) is an act of the Parliament of the United Kingdom, introduced by Earl Howe on behalf of the Government, relating to British Army which gives powers to the Defence Council of the United Kingdom to make regulations about geographically restricted service for regulars and the maximum number of occasions a 'regular' can be required to serve without such a geographic restriction.

== Intent ==
The goal of the legislation was to make the armed forces a more family-friendly employer so that the retention of members could be increased.

== Provisions ==
Flexible Service allows regular members of the armed forces to seek part-time work, reducing work routines by 20% or 40% equating to one or two days in a five-day working week and restricted separation from home base for no more than 35 days a year at the discretion of the Defence Council.

Requests for flexible service are not guaranteed acceptance.

== Commencement ==
The legislation came into effect in 2019.
