= Nearest relative =

The nearest relative is a designated relationship defined in the legislation of England and Wales through the Mental Health Act 1983, as amended by the Mental Health Act 2007. It is the duty of the Approved mental health professional to determine who is the nearest relative of the patient and consult them in the process of assessment, treatment or guardianship. The 'nearest relative' role can be very beneficial to people who have been admitted to hospital against their wishes, however the recruitment process has a number of issues which can be problematic for both the person themselves and the relative who takes on the role.

== Definition ==
In Section 26 of the Act, there is a specific hierarchy of kinship relations with the patient or in the context of the type and length of joint residency, as well as caring relationships which is used to determine the nearest relative. The hierarchy is the first person over 18, although a spouse may be younger, in the following list: husband or wife or civil partner (or those living together as husband or wife or civil partner for not less than 6 months); son or daughter; father or mother; brother or sister; grandparent; grandchild; uncle or aunt; nephew or niece; anyone else living with the person for not less than 5 years.

The eldest is given precedence in any instance. Relatives of half blood are treated the same as those of whole blood and an illegitimate child as the legitimate child of his mother, or his father, provided he has defined parental responsibility.

Under Section 26(6), partners who have been living together for over 6 months, as husband or wife, or civil partner, are considered the 'nearest relative'. Section 26(7) says that someone who has 'ordinarily' resided with the patient for over 5 years can be designated as the 'nearest relative'. S26(4) states that, if someone resides with one or more relatives who cares for them, then that relative is given preference over others, being designated 'nearest relative', presiding over the above hierarchy.

Under Section 26(5), a person who is ordinarily residing outside the United Kingdom, the Channel Islands or the Isle of Man cannot be considered the 'nearest relative' of a person ordinarily resident within the United Kingdom, the Channel Islands or the Isle of Man. Instead, in that case "the nearest relative of the patient shall be ascertained as if that person were dead", implying that this can hinder British nationals living abroad from having any say on the care of parents living in Britain, for example.

== Duty to consult ==
In assessing under Section 2 of the Act, Section 11(3) specifies a duty for the Approved Mental Health Professional to 'take such steps as are practicable' to inform the nearest relative and inform them of their power to request discharge under S23(2)(a) of the Act.

In assessing under Section 3 or Section 7 of the Act, the rules are different. Section 11(4) of the Act states the 'nearest relative' must be consulted and if they object to detention of the patient, then they cannot be detained, even if the professionals involved in the assessment make the decision to do so. They must also be informed of their right to request discharge in writing, under S23(2)(a) of the Act.

Section 11(4) of the Act concedes that the 'nearest relative' sometimes may not be consulted as it is 'not practicable' or would cause 'unreasonable delay'. Definition of the word 'practicable' is not always clear and to some extent has been defined by case law.

== Right to request discharge ==
The 'nearest relative' has the right to request discharge of patients detained under Section 2 (assessment), Section 3 (treatment), Section 7 (guardianship) or Section 17a (community treatment order) of the Act, by giving no more than 72 hours' notice in writing to the 'responsible clinician. This right, given in Section 23 of the Act, is circumscribed by Section 25 which states the request may be rejected if the 'responsible clinician' believes the patient 'would be likely to act in a manner dangerous to other persons or to himself'.

== Displacement ==
Section 29 of the Act defines five circumstances in which the nearest relative may be displaced by the County Court, with a 'nearest relative' appointed, and who may apply for a displacement order.

Application for displacement and appointment of a new 'nearest relative' can be made by the patient, their relative, anyone with whom they are residing or an Approved Mental Health Professional.

Grounds for making an application to displace, according to Section 29(3), include the patient having no discernible 'nearest relative' or the 'nearest relative' being 'incapable' due to mental disorder or other illness, 'unreasonably' objecting to detention, exercising their power to discharge without due regard for the patient's 'welfare' or being 'otherwise unsuitable' for the role.

The 'nearest relative' can relinquish their role by putting it in writing that they wish to delegate to another person, with their agreement, who has not been disqualified from acting as such.
