= Approved social worker =

In the United Kingdom, an approved social worker was a mental health social worker trained to enact elements of the Mental Health Act 1983. They received specific training relating to the Mental Health Act 1983, usually lasting one year, and performed assessments and participated in the detention process of people with mental illness.

Under the Mental Health Act 2007, the role was abolished and replaced by that of approved mental health professional (AMHP) in England and Wales. However, this role does still exist in Northern Ireland under the Mental Health (NI) Order 1986.
