= Mental Health Act 2007 =

Act of the Parliament of the United Kingdom

Mental Health Act 2007 (Note: Section 59.)
- Act of Parliament
- Parliament of the United Kingdom
- Long title: An Act to amend the Mental Health Act 1983, the Domestic Violence, Crime and Victims Act 2004 and the Mental Capacity Act 2005 in relation to mentally disordered persons; to amend section 40 of the Mental Capacity Act 2005; and for connected purposes.
- Citation: 2007 c. 12
- Introduced by: Patricia Hewitt MP, Secretary of State for Health (Commons); Lord Warner, the Department of Health and the Home Office. (Lords)
- Territorial extent: England and Wales; Scotland (in part); Northern Ireland (in part); (Note: Section 58.)

Dates
- Royal assent: 19 July 2007
- Commencement: Various (Note: Section 56.)
Other legislation
Amends	Colonial Prisoners Removal Act 1884; National Assistance Act 1948; Army Act 1955; Air Force Act 1955; Naval Discipline Act 1957; Administration of Justice Act 1960; Criminal Procedure (Insanity) Act 1964; Criminal Appeal Act 1968; Courts-Martial (Appeals) Act 1968; Local Authority Social Services Act 1970; Juries Act 1974; Mental Health Act 1983; Children Act 1989; Health Authorities Act 1995; Mental Health (Patients in the Community) Act 1995; Housing Act 1996; Crime (Sentences) Act 1997; Care Standards Act 2000; National Health Service Reform and Health Care Professions Act 2002; Health and Social Care (Community Health and Standards) Act 2003; Mental Health (Care and Treatment) (Scotland) Act 2003; Domestic Violence, Crime and Victims Act 2004; Civil Partnership Act 2004; Mental Health (Care and Treatment) (Scotland) Act 2003 (Consequential Provisions) Order 2005; Mental Health (Care and Treatment) (Scotland) Act 2003 (Consequential Provisions) Order 2005; National Health Service Act 2006; National Health Service (Wales) Act 2006; National Health Service (Consequential Provisions) Act 2006; Government of Wales Act 2006; Police and Justice Act 2006
Amended by	Offender Management Act 2007 (Consequential Amendments) Order 2008; Transfer of Tribunal Functions Order 2008; Health and Social Care Act 2012; Mental Health (Discrimination) Act 2013; Anti-social Behaviour, Crime and Policing Act 2014; Mental Capacity (Amendment) Act 2019

Status: Amended

History of passage through Parliament

Text of statute as originally enacted

Revised text of statute as amended

The Mental Health Act 2007 (c. 12) is an act of the Parliament of the United Kingdom. It amended the Mental Health Act 1983 and the Mental Capacity Act 2005. It applies to people residing in England and Wales. Most of the Act was implemented on 3 November 2008.

It introduced significant changes which included:

- Introduction of Supervised Community Treatment, including Community Treatment Orders (CTOs). This new power replaces supervised discharge with a power to return the patient to hospital, where the person may be forcibly medicated, if the medication regime is not being complied with in the community.
- Redefining professional roles: broadening the range of mental health professionals who can be responsible for the treatment of patients without their consent.
- Creating the role of approved clinician, which is a registered healthcare professional (social worker, nurse, psychologist or occupational therapist) approved by the appropriate authority to act for purposes of the Mental Health Act 1983 (as amended).
- Replacing the role of approved social worker by the role of approved mental health professional; the person fulfilling this role need not be a social worker.
- Nearest relative: making it possible for some patients to appoint a civil partner as nearest relative.
- Definition of mental disorder: introduce a new definition of mental disorder throughout the Act, abolishing previous categories
- Criteria for Involuntary commitment: introduce a requirement that someone cannot be detained for treatment unless appropriate treatment is available and remove the treatability test.
- Mental Health Tribunal (MHT): improve patient safeguards by taking an order-making power which will allow the current time limit to be varied and for automatic referral by hospital managers to the MHT.
- Introduction of independent mental health advocates (IMHAs) for 'qualifying patients'.
- Electroconvulsive Therapy may not be given to a patient who has capacity to refuse consent to it, and may only be given to an incapacitated patient where it does not conflict with any advance directive, decision of a donee or deputy or decision of the Court of Protection.

== Controversy ==
During the act's development, there were concerns expressed that the changes proposed by the Mental Health Bill were draconian. As a result, the government was forced in 2006 to abandon their original plans to introduce the bill outright and had to amend the 1983 act instead. Despite this concession, the bill was still defeated a number of times in the House of Lords, prior to its receiving royal assent.

As of 2010, the Green Party supported a reform of the Mental Health Act 2007 in order to remove transgender people from the Psychiatric Disorder Register, which they view as discriminatory.

In Labour's 2024 Manifesto, they stated that the "Mental Health Act discriminates against Black people who are much more likely to be detained than others," and that they will "modernise legislation to give patients greater choice, autonomy, enhanced rights and support, and ensure everyone is treated with dignity and respect throughout treatment."

== See also ==
- Principles for the Protection of Persons with Mental Illness adopted by the United Nations General Assembly
