= Independent mental health advocacy =

Mental health advocacy

Independent mental health advocacy, IMHA, is advocacy for someone being treated, possibly involuntarily, for a mental disorder provided by someone not involved in the treatment. IMHA can help a service user understand and exercise their rights and ensure their views and preferences are expressed. Advocacy seeks to address unequal power relations between mental health professionals and those using their services. Those who provide such advocacy are called Independent mental health advocates, IMHA.

IMHA complement the best interest advocacy where others make decisions based on what they think is in a service user, such as a psychiatric inpatient, best interest with representational advocacy which provides support for the patients autonomy, their ability to have a role in decisions made about them. IMHA can help support testimonial justice, allowing a service users voice to be heard; and hermeneutic justice, having one's understanding taken in account in decision making.

In some regions, psychiatric services are required to provide access to IMHA to all detained patients or those who are subject to community treatment orders.

== History ==
Voluntary sector mental health advocacy organizations began to emerge in the 1980s in the United Kingdom growing out of service user movements. A revision to the Mental Health Act 1983 in 2007 created a duty to provide advocacy to all detained patients and those subject to community treatment orders. The introduction of IMHA in the United Kingdom may be related to campaigning by the Mental health alliance in response to the introduction of community treatment orders.

== Role ==
IMHA advocates respresent the wishes of the people they advocate for regardless of the wishes of the family. They share all the information they have with a service user regardless of what impact they think this information will have. They ask the questions necessary to mediate in decision making but do not make decisions on the behalf of patients. Minor decisions such as filling out paper work may be delegated to IMHA advocates.

IMHA advocates will help service users exercise their rights, express their views, make complaints, make applications to mental health tribunals, access legal advice by meeting service users in private to understand their situation and views, accessing medical and social records, meeting with professionals involved, and attending meetings or hearings.

== Patients' perception of advocacy ==
Some patients perceive advocates roles as supporting them in understanding their rights under mental health law and ensuring these rights are upheld. In a study, young people viewed IMHAs role as independently understanding a service users viewpoint and ensuring that it was presented at meetings. In a study with, African and African Caribbean men, service users viewed IMHAs as defenders of rights, and viewed an advocate as a partner, emphasising self-advocacy as being important.

== Attitudes of clinicians ==
Clinicians support advocacy but often conceptualize it as advocating for the best interests of a patient rather than supporting their autonomy or rights. Attitudes towards IMHA are less positive amongst professionals working in community care than those working in an inpatient setting.

== International status ==
=== Australian State of West Australia ===
IMHAs have statutory status in the Australian State of West Australia.

=== Australian State of Victoria ===
There is not an independent advocacy service on a statutory basis in Victoria, but a service called the IMHA to provide advocacy was created in 2015 and is recognised by legislation.

=== Canada ===
Some Canadian provinces such as New Brunswick, Newfoundland, Labrador, Nova Scotia, Ontaria, Saskatchewen have independent advocacy offices that provide advice and must be independent from the treatment team.

=== England and Wales ===
A revision to the Mental Health Act 1983 in 2007 created a duty to provide advocacy to all detained patients and those subject to community treatment orders.

=== Scotland ===
IMHAs have statutory status in Scotland.

=== Northern Ireland ===
IMHAs have statutory status in Northern Ireland.
