= Place of safety =

Removal to a place of safety is a form of detention. It refers to a practice where an individual is temporarily taken to a designated location, such as a hospital, care facility, or shelter, when authorities determine that there is a risk to the individual’s health or safety, or a risk that the individual may cause harm to others. This intervention, is typically used in contexts such as mental health care, child protection, and immigration.

== Australia ==
=== Queensland ===
As to Queensland, see sections 25 to 27 of the Mental Health Act 1974.

=== Tasmania ===
As to Tasmania, see sections 99 and 100 of the Mental Health Act 1963 (No 63).

== United Kingdom ==
=== England and Wales ===
The term "place of safety" is a technical term used in mental health law in England and Wales. It is used in the Mental Health Act 1983, an Act of the Parliament of the United Kingdom that forms part of the mental health law of the jurisdiction of England and Wales.

Section 136 of the Act gives police officers the power to remove an apparently mentally disordered person who is in a public place and is apparently a danger to himself or to other people, to a "place of safety" where they may be assessed by a doctor.

Section 135 of the Act gives police powers to remove a person who is not in a public place to a place of safety after the issue of a warrant by a Justice of the Peace.

These provisions replace the corresponding provisions in sections 135 and 136 of the Mental Health Act 1959.

According to a unilateral statement by the Home Office, places of safety should typically be hospitals, other medical facilities, residential care homes or the home of a relative or friend of the person; police stations should only be used as a "place of safety" as a last resort.

In practice, local agreements between local authorities, NHS Trusts and police constabularies are in place, designating certain establishments as places of safety. The owners or managers of an establishment acting as a place of safety have a legal obligation to ensure that a detained person cannot leave the premises until he or she has been fully assessed, which may take up to 24 hours. Invariably, therefore, to ensure safeguarding of both the detained person and the public, places of safety are typically restricted to psychiatric hospitals and police custody suites, and tend to exclude open general hospital wards and accident and emergency departments. For the same reason, it is most unusual for friends' or relatives' homes to be designated places of safety.

The decision whether to detain a particular person in a psychiatric hospital or in police custody is also subject to local agreements. It is a common arrangement for people to be taken to a psychiatric hospital unless they have a history of violence or are thought to be under the influence of alcohol or recreational drugs, in which cases they would be taken into police custody.

=== Scotland ===
As to Scotland, see section 297 of the Mental Health (Care and Treatment) Act 2003.

== See also ==
- Preventive detention
