= Approved mental health professional =

The role of approved mental health professional (AMHP) in the United Kingdom was created in the 2007 amendment of the Mental Health Act 1983 to replace the role of approved social worker (ASW). The role is broadly similar to the role of the approved social worker but is distinguished in no longer being the exclusive preserve of social workers. It can be undertaken by other professionals including registered mental health or learning disability nurses, occupational therapists and chartered psychologists after completing appropriate post-qualifying masters level training at level 7 NQF and being approved by a local authority for a period of up to five years, subject to re-warranting. An AMHP is approved to carry out functions under the Mental Health Act 1983, and as such, they carry with them a warrant card, like police officers. The role of the AMHP is to coordinate the assessment of individuals who are being considered for detention under the Mental Health Act 1983. The reason why some specialist mental health professionals are eligible to undertake this role is broadly to avoid excessive medicalisation of the assessment and treatment for individuals living with a mental disorder, as defined by section 1 of the Mental Health Act 1983. It is the role of the AMHP to decide, founded on the medical recommendations of doctors (or a doctor for the purpose of section 4 of the Act), whether a person should be detained under the Mental Health Act 1983.

== Professional role ==
Approved mental health professionals (AMHPs) are trained to implement elements of the Mental Health Act 1983, as amended by the Mental Health Act 2007, in conjunction with medical practitioners. They have received specific training at least at Level 7 on the National Qualifications Framework, such as a MSc Mental Health (AHMP) or PGDip in Mental Health Studies relating to the application the Mental Health Acts, usually lasting one or two years and perform the role in assessing and deciding whether there are grounds to detain mentally disordered people who meet the statutory criteria. The AMHP is also an important healthcare professional when making decisions under guardianship or community treatment orders.

Assessment and detention under the Act is colloquially known as being 'sectioned', or 'sectioning', in reference to the application of sections of the Mental Health Act relevant to this process. The role to apply for the 'section' remains with the AMHP, not the medical doctor, as many professionals and lay individuals think, thus a doctor may feel a section is needed, although it is actually the AMHP who is the individual who will decide if this is required after detailed assessment and consultations with the medical doctors.

== Mental Health Act assessments ==
AMHPs are responsible for organising, co-ordinating and contributing to Mental Health Act assessments. It is the AMHP's duty, when two medical recommendations have been made, to decide whether or not to make an application to a named hospital for the detention of the person who has been assessed. To be detained under the Mental Health Act individuals need to have a mental disorder, the nature or degree of which warrants detention in hospital on the grounds of their health and/or the risk they present to themselves and/or the risk they present to others. The AMHP's role includes arranging for the assessment of the person concerned by two medical practitioners who must be independent of each other and at least one of whom should be a specialist in mental health, called being 'section 12 approved' under section 12 of the Mental Health Act 1983. Preferably one of the medical assessors should have previous acquaintance with the person being assessed. Efforts should be made to seek less restrictive alternatives to detention if it is safe and appropriate to do so, such as using an individual's own support networks, in line with the principle of care in the least restrictive environment. AMHP's are expected to take account of factors such as gender, culture, ethnicity, age, sexuality and disability in their assessments. Efforts should be also made to overcome any communication barriers, such as deafness or the assessors and the assessed not sharing a language, and an interpreter may be required. It is not good practice for one of the assessors to act as interpreter.

=== The nearest relative ===
An important factor in assessments is the role of the Nearest Relative. Which person qualifies as the Nearest Relative is determined according to a hierarchy outlined in the Mental Health Act. If the individual is to be detained under Section 2 (assessment) of the Act, the AMHP is expected to make reasonable efforts to contact the Nearest Relative and invite their views. It is also the AMHP's role to inform them of their right to discharge the person concerned in some circumstances. If the individual is to be detained under Section 3 (treatment) of the Act, the AMHP must ask the Nearest Relative if they object to the individual being detained and if they do then the detention cannot go ahead. There are occasions when the Nearest Relative need not be contacted or might need to be displaced by a court. A Nearest Relative can delegate their role to another appropriate person.

=== Detention in hospital ===
The assessors are encouraged by the Code of Practice to discuss the assessment together once the two medical examinations and the AMHP's interview have taken place. For Section 2 and Section 3, assessments by medical practitioners need to take place with no more than five clear days between each other. AMHPs then have up to fourteen days from the time of the second medical assessment to make the decision whether or not to make an application for detention. If proceeding with the application, AMHPs are then responsible for organising the detained individual's safe conveyance to hospital. The best method of conveyance is that which ensures the individual's dignity, comfort and safety. This might be by ambulance or by the police or by some other method. The AMHP will attend at the named hospital and will give the paperwork to nursing staff who check it and receive the application on behalf of the hospital managers. Some errors in the paperwork can be rectified later and the application remains valid. Some other errors invalidate the application and the detention is then no longer lawful.

=== Community treatment orders ===
The revised Mental Health Act makes provision for community treatment orders (CTOs). CTOs can be arranged for patients detained under Section 3 (treatment) of the Act, allowing them to return to a place of residence in the community, depending on particular specified conditions, such as to the taking of medication or participating in therapies. If conditions are breached, patients can be formally recalled to hospital for a period of up to 72 hours, during which a decision should be made as to whether their CTO should be revoked. If the CTO is revoked, patients return to being at the beginning of a Section 3 and are automatically referred for a mental health review tribunal. AMHPs work with the responsible clinician and others in the process of assessment and decision making in setting up CTOs and in making decisions on revocation.
