= Principles for the Protection of Persons with Mental Illness =

UN General Assembly Resolution 46/119
- Date: 17 December 1991
- Code: A/RES/46/119 (Document)
- Subject: Protection of persons with mental illness and improvement of mental health care
- Result: Adopted

The Principles for the Protection of Persons with Mental Illness and the Improvement of Mental Health Care (MI Principles) were adopted by the United Nations General Assembly in 1991. They provide agreed but non-legally-binding basic standards that mental health systems should meet and rights that people diagnosed with mental disorder should have. Although the document underwent extensive drafting for 20 years and remains the international human rights agreement most specifically concerned with mental health, it has been criticised for not offering stronger protections in some areas. It should now be read in the context of the United Nations Convention on the Rights of Persons with Disabilities.

There are 25 principles:

- Fundamental freedoms and basic rights
- Protection of minors
- Life in the community
- Determination of mental illness
- Medical examination
- Confidentiality
- Role of community and culture
- Standards of care
- Treatment
- Medication
- Consent to treatment
- Notice of rights
- Rights and conditions in mental health facilities
- Resources for mental health facilities
- Admission principles
- Involuntary admission
- Review body
- Procedural safeguards
- Access to information
- Criminal offenders
- Complaints
- Monitoring and remedies
- Implementation
- Scope of principles relating to mental health facilities
- Saving of existing rights
