= Mental Health Act 1983 =

Act of the Parliament of the United Kingdom

Mental Health Act 1983 (Note: Section 149(1).)
- Act of Parliament
- Parliament of the United Kingdom
- Long title: An Act to consolidate the law relating to mentally disordered people.
- Citation: 1983 c. 20
- Territorial extent: England and Wales; Scotland (in part) (Note: Section 146.); Northern Ireland (in part) (Note: Section 147.)

Dates
- Royal assent: 9 May 1983
- Commencement: 30 September 1983 (Note: Section 149(2).)
Other legislation
Amends	Chelsea and Kilmainham Hospitals Act 1826; Colonial Prisoners Removal Act 1884; Polish Resettlement Act 1947; Variation of Trusts Act 1958; Criminal Appeal Act 1968; Bail Act 1976; See § Repealed enactments
Amended by	Registered Homes Act 1984; Mental Health (Scotland) Act 1984; Inheritance Tax Act 1984; Statute Law (Repeals) Act 1986; Tribunals and Inquiries Act 1992; Taxation of Chargeable Gains Act 1992; Statute Law (Repeals) Act 1993; Crime and Disorder Act 1998; Statute Law (Repeals) Act 1998; Postal Services Act 2000; Health and Social Care Act 2001; Land Registration Act 2002; Statute Law (Repeals) Act 2004; Domestic Violence, Crime and Victims Act 2004; Mental Capacity Act 2005; Government of Wales Act 2006; Violent Crime Reduction Act 2006; National Health Service (Consequential Provisions) Act 2006; Mental Health Act 2007; Criminal Justice and Immigration Act 2008; Criminal Justice and Courts Act 2015; Postal Services Act 2011; Policing and Crime Act 2017; Wales Act 2017; Offensive Weapons Act 2019; Sentencing Act 2020; Mental Health Act 2025
Relates to	Mental Health (Scotland) Act 1984

Status: Amended

Text of statute as originally enacted

Revised text of statute as amended

Text of the Mental Health Act 1983 as in force today (including any amendments) within the United Kingdom, from legislation.gov.uk.

The Mental Health Act 1983 (c. 20) is an act of the Parliament of the United Kingdom. It covers the reception, care and treatment of mentally disordered people, the management of their property and other related matters, forming part of the mental health law for the people in England and Wales. In particular, it provides the legislation by which people thought to have a mental disorder can be detained in a hospital or police custody and have their disorder assessed or treated against their wishes, informally known as "sectioning". Its use is reviewed and regulated by the Care Quality Commission.

The act was significantly amended by the Mental Health Act 2007. A white paper proposing changes to the act was published in 2021 following an independent review of the act by Simon Wessely. It was confirmed in July 2024 that a new mental health act would be legislated for in the forthcoming session of Parliament, and the Mental Health Act 2025 was passed the following year.

== History ==
The Madhouses Act 1774 (14 Geo. 3. c. 49) created a Commission of the Royal College of Physicians with powers to grant licences to premises housing "lunatics" in London; justices of the peace were given these powers elsewhere in England and Wales. Failure to gain a licence resulted in a hefty fine. Admission to a "madhouse" required certification signed by a doctor, and lists of detained residents became available for public inspection. This act was later considered ineffectual and was repealed by the Madhouse Act 1828 (9 Geo. 4. c. 41), itself repealed shortly afterwards by the Insane Persons (England) Act 1832 (2 & 3 Will. 4. c. 107) . These acts altered the composition of the Commission in several ways, such as including barristers in addition to doctors.

The Lunacy Act 1845 (8 & 9 Vict. c. 100) and the County Asylums Act 1845 (8 & 9 Vict. c. 100) together gave mental hospitals or "asylums" the authority to detain "lunatics, idiots and persons of unsound mind". Each county was compelled to provide an asylum for "pauper lunatics", who were removed from workhouses into the aforementioned asylums. The Lunacy Commission was established to monitor asylums, their admissions, treatments and discharges.

Both these acts were repealed by the Lunacy Act 1890 (53 & 54 Vict. c. 5). This introduced "reception orders", authorising detention in asylums. These orders had to be made by a specialised Justice of the Peace and lasted one year. Thereafter, detention could be renewed at regular intervals by submission of a medical report to the Lunacy Commission. The Mental Deficiency Act 1913 (3 & 4 Geo. 5. c. 28) renamed the Lunacy Commission the "Board of Control" and increased the scope of its powers. The functions of the Board of Control were subsequently altered by the Mental Treatment Act 1930 (20 & 21 Geo. 5. c. 23) and the National Health Service Act 1946 (9 & 10 Geo. 6. c. 81).

The 1890 act was repealed following World War II by the Mental Health Act 1959 (7 & 8 Eliz. 2. c. 72), which abolished the Board of Control, and aimed to provide informal treatment for the majority of people with mental disorders, whilst providing a legal framework so that people could, if necessary, be detained in a hospital against their will. It also aimed to make local councils responsible for the care of mentally disordered people who did not require hospital admission.

However, like its predecessors, the 1959 act did not provide clarity as to whether a legal order to detain a mentally disordered person in a hospital also empowered the hospital to impose medical treatment against the person's wishes. It had become clear by the 1970s that a specific legal framework for medical treatments such as psychiatric medications, electroconvulsive therapy and psychosurgery was needed in order to balance the rights of detained persons with society as a whole.

The act was formally approved by the monarch on 9 May 1983 and came into effect on 30 September that year. It has been amended many times: notably in 1995, 2001 (via remedial order, issued on the grounds of incompatibility with the European Convention on Human Rights under the Human Rights Act 1998 section 4), 2007 and 2017 via the Policing and Crime Act 2017.

== Provisions ==
The act is divided into eleven "parts" (one repealed):

I Application of the act

II Compulsory admission to hospital and guardianship

III Patients concerned in criminal proceedings or under sentence

IV Consent to treatment

4A Treatment of community patients not recalled to hospital

V Mental Health Review Tribunal

VI Removal and return of patients within the United Kingdom

VII Management of property and affairs of patients (repealed)

VIII Miscellaneous functions of Local Authorities and the Secretary of State

IX Offences

X Miscellaneous and supplementary

Each of these parts are divided into "sections", which are numbered continuously throughout the act. In total, there are currently 202 sections in the act that are in force.

== Legal processes, detention of people, and involuntary treatment ==
The act lays out various procedures to detain members of the public, inpatients, force them to take drugs, and perform medical procedures on them without consent.

Legal processes to detain people under the act
Action	Applies to	Changes status to	Proposed by	Approved by
Threat of Section 2 by Responsible clinician	Free individual	Voluntary inpatient	Approved Clinician	No one
Section 5(4)	Voluntary inpatient	72-hour hold	Nurse	No one
Section 5(2)	Voluntary inpatient	Section 2 Inpatient	Any Medical Doctor	No one
Section 2	Free individual	Section 2 Inpatient	Responsible Clinician	Doctor and AMHP (conditions)
Section 2	Voluntary inpatient	Section 2 Inpatient	Approved Clinician	Doctor and AMHP (conditions)
Request to be discharged	Section 2	Free individual	Patient	Responsible Clinician
Threat of section 3 by Responsible clinician	Section 2 inpatient	Voluntary inpatient	Responsible Clinician	Responsible Clinician
Section 3	Voluntary inpatient	Section 3 inpatient	Responsible Clinician	Doctor and AMHP (conditions)
Section 3	Section 2 inpatient	Section 3 inpatient	Responsible Clinician	Doctor and AMHP (conditions)

Period of Detention under the act
Detention period	Applies to	Action	Proposed by	Approved by
72-hour detention	Voluntary inpatient	Section 5(4)	Nurse	No one
72-hour detention	Voluntary inpatient	Section 5(2)	Any doctor	No one
28 days detention	Free individual	Section 2	Responsible Clinician	Doctor and AMHP (conditions)
6 month detention	Voluntary inpatient	Section 3	Responsible Clinician	Doctor and AMHP (conditions)
6 month detention	Section 2 inpatient	Section 3	Responsible Clinician	Doctor and AMHP (conditions)
1 year detention	Section 3 inpatient	Section 3	Responsible Clinician	Doctor and AMHP

== Analysis ==
=== Definition of mental disorder ===
The term "mental disorder" is very loosely defined under the act, in contrast to legislation in other countries such as Australia and Canada. Under the act, mental disorder is defined as "any disorder or disability of mind". The concept of mental disorder as defined by the act does not necessarily correspond to medical categories of mental disorder such as those outlined in ICD-10 or DSM-IV. However, mental disorder is thought by most psychiatrists to cover schizophrenia, anorexia nervosa, major depression, bipolar disorder and other similar illnesses, learning disability and personality disorders.

=== Professionals and persons involved ===
==== Subjects ====
Most people are subject to the act. Section 141 made provision for disqualification of sectioned members of the House of Commons, until it was repealed by the Mental Health (Discrimination) Act 2013. In 1983–84, the House of Lords Committee for Privileges accepted the advice of the law lords that the statute would prevail against any privilege of Parliament or of peerage.

==== Approved Mental Health Professionals ====
An Approved Mental Health Professional (AMHP) is defined in the act as a practitioner who has extensive knowledge and experience of working with people with mental disorders. Until the 2007 amendments, this role was restricted to social workers, but other professionals such as nurses, clinical psychologists and occupational therapists are now permitted to perform this role. AMHPs receive specialised training in mental disorder and the application of mental health law, particularly the Mental Health Act. Training involves both academic work and apprenticeship and lasts one year. The AMHP has a key role in the organisation and application of Mental Health Act assessments and provides a valuable non-medical perspective in ensuring legal process and accountability.

(For further aspects on the role of the AMHP see also: Involuntary commitment in the United Kingdom.)

==== Section 12 approved doctors ====
A section 12 approved doctor is a medically qualified doctor who has been recognised under section 12(2) of the act. They have specific expertise in mental disorder and have additionally received training in the application of the act. They are usually psychiatrists, although some are general practitioners (GPs) who have a special interest in psychiatry.

==== Approved Clinicians and Responsible Clinicians ====
An Approved Clinician (AC) is a healthcare professional who is competent to become responsible for the treatment of mentally disordered people compulsorily detained under the act. A clinician must complete special training and demonstrate competence in their professional portfolio in order to be approved as an AC. Until the 2007 amendments, they would almost exclusively have been a consultant psychiatrist, but other professionals, such as social workers, clinical psychologists and nurse specialists, are being encouraged to take on the role. Once an AC takes over the care of a specific patient, they are known as the Responsible Clinician (RC) for that patient.

==== Nearest Relatives ====
A Nearest Relative is a relative of a mentally disordered person. There is a strict hierarchy of types of relationship that needs to be followed in order to determine a particular person's Nearest Relative: husband, wife, or civil partner; son or daughter; father or mother; brother or sister; grandparent; grandchild; uncle or aunt; nephew or niece; lastly, an unrelated person who resides with the mentally disordered person. Thus a person's Nearest Relative under the act is not necessarily their "next of kin".

A mentally disordered person is not usually able to choose their Nearest Relative but under some circumstances they can apply to a County Court to have a Nearest Relative replaced. In practice, such applications are more commonly made by Social Services Departments. The Nearest Relative has the power to discharge the mentally disordered person from some sections of the act.

==== Hospital Managers ====
Hospital Managers represent the management of the NHS Trust or independent hospital and have the responsibility for a detained patient. On their behalf, the non-executive members of the board of the relevant National Health Service Trust and appointed lay 'Associate Managers' may hear appeals from patients against their detention, Community Treatment Order and upon those detentions being renewed and extended. Cases are heard in similar settings to those heard by the First-Tier Tribunal (Mental Health) outlined below.

==== First-Tier Tribunal (Mental Health) ====
Mental Health Review Tribunals (MHRTs) hear appeals against detention under the act. Their members are appointed by the Lord Chancellor and include a doctor, a lawyer and a lay person (i.e. neither a doctor nor a lawyer). Detained persons have the right to be represented at MHRTs by a solicitor. Discharge from hospital as a result of an MHRT hearing is the exception to the rule, occurring in around 5% of cases, when the Tribunal judges that the conditions for detention are not met.

=== Civil sections ===
Part II of the act applies to any mentally disordered person who is not subject to the Criminal Justice System. The vast majority of people detained in psychiatric hospitals in England and Wales are detained under one of the civil sections of the act. If a clinician consents, patients may choose to be treated as voluntary inpatient. This choice is sometimes as a means to avoid the threat of detention under sections of this act by a medical doctor.

These sections are implemented following an assessment of the person suspected to have a mental disorder. These assessments can be performed by various professional groups, depending upon the particular section of the act being considered. These professional groups include AMHPs, Section 12 approved doctors, other doctors, registered mental health nurses (RMNs) and police officers.

==== Assessment orders ====
Section 2 is an assessment order and lasts up to 28 days; it cannot be renewed. It can be instituted following an assessment under the act by two doctors and an AMHP. At least one of these doctors must be a Section 12 approved doctor. The other must either have had previous acquaintance with the person under assessment, or also be a Section 12 approved doctor. This latter rule can be broken in an emergency where the person is not known to any available doctors and two Section 12 approved doctors cannot be found. In any case, the two doctors must not be employed in the same service, to ensure independence (this 'rule' was removed in the 2007 MHA amendment). Commonly, in order to satisfy this requirement, a psychiatrist will perform a joint assessment with a general practitioner (GP). A Mental Health Act assessment can take place anywhere, but commonly occurs in a hospital, at a police station, or in a person's home.

If the two doctors agree that the person has a mental disorder and ought to be detained in hospital in the interest of the patient's own health or safety, or for the protection of others, they complete a medical recommendation form and give this to the AMHP. If the AMHP agrees that there is no viable alternative to detaining the person in hospital, they will complete an application form requesting that the hospital managers detain the person. The person will then be transported to hospital and the period of assessment begins. Treatment, such as medication, can be given against the person's wishes under Section 2 assessment orders, as observation of response to treatment constitutes part of the assessment process.

==== Treatment orders ====
Section 3 is a treatment order and can initially last up to six months; if renewed, the next order lasts up to six months and each subsequent order lasts up to one year. It is instituted in the same manner as Section 2, following an assessment by two doctors and an AMHP. One major difference, however, is that for Section 3 treatment orders, the doctors must be clear about the diagnosis and proposed treatment plan, and be confident that "appropriate medical treatment" is available for the patient. The definition of "appropriate medical treatment" is wide and may constitute basic nursing care alone.

Most treatments for mental disorder can be given under Section 3 treatment orders, including injections of psychotropic medication such as antipsychotics. However, after three months of detention, either the person has to consent to their treatment or an independent doctor has to give a second opinion to confirm that the treatment being given remains in the person's best interests. A similar safeguard is used for electroconvulsive therapy (ECT), although the RC can authorise two ECT treatments in the event of an emergency for people detained under Section 3 treatment orders. ECT may not be given to a refusing patient who has the capacity to refuse it, and may only be given to an incapacitated patient where it does not conflict with any advance directive, decision of a donor or deputy, or decision of the Court of Protection.

==== Leave and Discharge ====
Absence or "leave" from hospital can be granted by the RC for a patient detained under either a Section 2 assessment order or Section 3 treatment order, and the RC will ultimately be responsible for discharging a patient under such an order. Following discharge from a Section 3 treatment order, the person remains subject to the after-care provisions of Section 117 indefinitely. These provisions include a formal discharge planning meeting, and provision of personal care if necessary.

==== Emergency orders ====
Section 4 is an emergency order that lasts up to 72 hours. It is implemented by just one doctor and an AMHP, in an emergency in which there is not time to summon a second suitable doctor in order to implement a Section 2 assessment order or Section 3 treatment order. Once in hospital, a further medical recommendation from a second doctor would convert the order from a Section 4 emergency order to a Section 2 assessment order. Section 4 emergency orders are not commonly used.

==== Holding powers ====
Section 5(2) is a doctor's holding power. It can only be used to detain in hospital a person who has consented to admission on an informal basis (i.e. not detained under the act) but then changed their mind and wishes to leave. It can be implemented following a (usually brief) assessment by the RC or his deputy, which, in effect, means any hospital doctor, including psychiatrists but also those based on medical or surgical wards. It lasts up to 72 hours, during which time a further assessment may result in either discharge from the section or detention under section 2 for assessment or section 3 for treatment.

Section 5(4) is a nurse's holding power. It can be applied to the same group of patients as those that may be detained under section 5(2) as outlined above. It is implemented by a first or second level Mental Health or Learning Disability Nurse. Section 5(4) lasts up to 6 hours and ends at the time the patient is seen by the doctor assessing the patient under Section 5(2), irrespective of the outcome of the doctor's assessment. Time spent by a patient under section 5(4) is included in the 72 hours of any subsequent Section 5(2).

The Care Quality Commission consider it to be extremely poor practice to allow a section 5(2) to simply "lapse". There is a clear duty on the part of the patient's RC to make a decision as to whether any further action, such as detention under section 2 for assessment or detention under section 3 for treatment should be implemented, or whether the patient should be regraded to "informal" legal status.

==== Magistrates' and police officers' orders ====
Section 135 is a magistrates' order. It can be applied for by an AMHP in the best interests of a person who is thought to be mentally disordered, but who is refusing to allow mental health professionals into their residence for the purposes of a Mental Health Act assessment. Section 135 magistrates' orders give police officers the right to enter the property and to take the person to a "place of safety", which is locally defined and usually either a police station or a psychiatric hospital ward.

Section 136 is a similar order that allows a police officer to take a person whom they consider to be mentally disordered to a "place of safety" as defined above. This only applies to a person found in a public place. Once a person subject to a Section 135 magistrates' order or Section 136 police officers' order is at a place of safety, they are further assessed and, in some cases, a Section 2 assessment order or Section 3 treatment order implemented.

=== Informal Patients ===
Section 131 allows for patients to be voluntarily admitted as an inpatient, and voluntarily remain after other sections cease to apply. Voluntary inpatients may be prevented from leaving by a physician under section 5(2) or any nurse under section 5(4) for 72 hours before being assessed for commitment through section 3 or section 2.

=== Criminal sections ===
Part III and other various criminal sections of the act apply to sentenced prisoners and persons subject to proceedings of the criminal justice System. Although they are invariably implemented by a court, often upon the recommendations of one or more psychiatrists, some of these sections largely mirror the civil sections of the act.

==== Pre-trial orders ====
Section 35 and Section 36 are similar in their powers to Section 2 assessment orders and Section 3 treatment orders respectively, but are used for persons awaiting trial for a serious crime and provide courts with an alternative to remanding a mentally disordered person in prison. The order for Section 35 can be made by the Crown Court or a magistrates' court, whilst Section 36 can be enacted only by a Crown Court. Courts can enact either of these sections on the medical recommendation of one Section 12 approved doctor. Both these sections are rarely used in practice.

==== Post-trial orders ====
Section 37 is a treatment order, similar in many regards to the civil treatment order under Section 3, and is fairly frequently used. It is applied to persons recently convicted of a serious crime (other than murder), which is punishable by imprisonment. Thus it represents an alternative to a mentally disordered person being punished by imprisonment or otherwise. It is enacted by the Crown Court or a magistrates' court on the recommendation of two approved doctors. However, the court is able to exercise discretion in this regard and can impose a prison sentence despite medical recommendations for Section 37.

A person detained under Section 37 can appeal to the Mental Health Review Tribunal after a period of six months; if they are no longer experiencing symptoms of mental disorder, the person can be discharged by the Tribunal, even if there is a strong possibility that the person might relapse and re-offend. Furthermore, a person on Section 37 alone, who may have been convicted of a serious violent crime, can be discharged in the community at any time by his or her Responsible Clinician (RC).

For these reasons, people who either are deemed by the court to pose a particularly high risk to other people if released, have a pronounced history of dangerous behaviour, or have committed a particularly serious offence, usually have Section 41 used in conjunction with Section 37. Section 41 imposes "restrictions" upon the terms of Section 37. In summary, this means that the Home Office and, ultimately, the Home Secretary, rather than the RC, decides when the person can leave hospital, either temporarily ("leave") or permanently ("discharge"). Indeed, most people are ultimately given a "conditional discharge", which sets a statutory framework for psychiatric follow-up in the community upon release and provides for recall into hospital if, for instance, a person disengages from mental health services.

Only a Crown Court can impose Section 41, but a judge can do so without a doctor's recommendation. Although persons on Section 41 can appeal against their detention to the Mental Health Review Tribunal, their cases are heard by a Special Tribunal, chaired by a High Court judge. Since the 2007 amendments have been implemented, Section 41 is universally imposed without limit of time.

Section 38 is an interim order, used in similar circumstances to Section 37, when it is likely, but not wholly clear, that a Section 37 will be appropriate.

==== Transfer orders ====
It is noteworthy that the act only provides for enforced treatment of mental disorder in a hospital. As a prison is not defined as a "hospital" by the act, no prisoner can be treated against his or her wishes under the act in prison, even in a prison healthcare wing. Instead, Sections 47 and 48 provide for prisoners to be transferred to a hospital for treatment of a mental disorder. Section 47 applies to sentenced prisoners, whilst Section 48 applies to those on remand and those convicted but awaiting sentence; it provides for temporary treatment out of prison. Section 48 can be used only for prisoners in need of urgent treatment for mental illness or severe mental impairment, whilst Section 47 can be used to treat any category of mental disorder. The Home Office is required to approve applications for these sections and decides what level of security in hospital is necessary for a particular prisoner.

Section 49 provides for "restrictions" to Section 47, in the same way that Section 41 provides for "restrictions" to Section 37.

=== Physical illness ===
The act provides the legal framework for the assessment and treatment of mental disorders. It does not provide for the assessment or treatment of physical illnesses. There has been substantial case law to confirm this interpretation. Thus, a person who has a mental illness as well as an unrelated physical illness for which he is refusing treatment, cannot be treated for his physical illness against his wishes under the act. In such cases, however, it might be deemed that the person lacks the mental capacity to consent to treatment of the physical illness, in which case treatment could be given, in the person's best interests, under the Mental Capacity Act 2005.

However, if the physical illness is causing the mental disorder, or if the physical illness is a direct consequence of the mental disorder, treatment of the physical illness is permitted under the act.

A common example of this is a person who has a short-lived confused state as a result of a physical illness such as an infection or a heart attack, but who is refusing assessment or treatment of the underlying condition. It is legal to treat such a physical illness under Section 2 of the Mental Health Act, on the grounds that treatment of the physical illness will alleviate symptoms of the mental disorder. However, this is rarely carried out in practice, given that the mental disorder is likely to be extremely transitory and emergency treatment is often necessary. It is more usual for physical illnesses to be treated under the Mental Capacity Act 2005 where appropriate in these circumstances.

On the other hand, enforced re-feeding of severely emaciated people with anorexia nervosa is more likely to take place under the act, because treatment is likely to be prolonged and is rarely an emergency. Treatment is allowed because anorexia nervosa is classed as a mental disorder, whilst re-feeding is seen to constitute the first stage in treatment for severe cases of that mental disorder.

Lastly, treatment of an attempted suicide, which has been made as a direct result of a mental disorder, can be given under the act. Again, in practice, this is unusual, as the emergency nature of the situation and the brief timeframe of treatment required usually dictate that treatment is given under the Mental Capacity Act instead.

=== Community Care and Treatment ===
The main thrust of the act provides the power to detain a person in hospital to treat their mental disorder. There is currently no provision allowing compulsory treatment of mentally disordered people in the community. Indeed, the act was drafted at a time when mental health care was focused on institutions rather than Care in the Community. Since the 1980s, there has been a huge shift in emphasis of mental health care away from inpatient treatment.

Under Sections 7 and 8 of the act, "guardianship" allows for a mentally disordered person to be required to reside at a specific address, to attend a specific clinic on a regular basis for medical treatment, or to attend various other stipulated venues such as workplaces or educational establishments. However, there is no power to actually enforce the person to comply with these requirements. Indeed, although guardianship can require a person to attend a clinic for treatment, there is no requirement for the person to accept that treatment.

Supervised Community Treatment orders, a form of outpatient commitment, provider the power to return a patient to hospital if a specified treatment regime is not being complied with in the community under Section 17A of the act. However, treatment cannot be enforced in the community. These orders are applied to the person at the time of his/her discharge from Section 3, and replace "supervised discharge" arrangements under Section 20A which were used until the 2007 amendments came into force. 2018 amendments also strictly limit the use of force while restraining a patient.

=== Right to independent advocacy ===
Amendments in 2007 gave those detained and under community treatment orders rights to speak to an independent mental health advocate.

== Criticisms ==
There have been concerns amongst mental health professionals that the 2007 amendments have been based more upon tabloid stories on the danger presented by mentally disordered people, especially people with personality disorder such as Michael Stone, than on the practical shortcomings of the unamended Act. Critics asserted that it would mean mental health professionals being "suborned as agents of social control". Supporters of more restrictive legislation insisted that dangerous people must be detained in hospital by doctors in their own interests and for public protection, regardless of whether they can be treated. In 2010, detentions under the law were further criticized following the death of mental patient Seni Lewis after being restrained at a mental hospital ward by 11 officers. The Mental Health Units (Use of Force) Act 2018, also known as Seni's Law, received royal assent in January 2018 after being passed by Parliament and amended the Mental Health Act 1983. It requires that mental hospitals provide officer training which provides alternatives to the use of force while restraining patients and implement better collection of data. The officers must also wear body cameras.

=== Racial disparity ===
2021 data from NHS Digital indicated that Black people in England were over four times more likely to be sectioned (detained for compulsory treatment) under the Mental Health Act than White people – a longstanding inequality that has prompted calls for reforms to make the act and mental health services more culturally fair.

== Repeals and extent ==
=== Repealed enactments ===
Section 148(3) of the act repealed 69 enactments, listed in schedule 6 to the act.

Chapter	Short title	Extent of repeal
7 & 8 Eliz. 2. c. 72	Mental Health Act 1959	Sections 1 to 5.
7 & 8 Eliz. 2. c. 72	Mental Health Act 1959	Section 10.
7 & 8 Eliz. 2. c. 72	Mental Health Act 1959	Section 22.
7 & 8 Eliz. 2. c. 72	Mental Health Act 1959	Sections 25 to 35.
7 & 8 Eliz. 2. c. 72	Mental Health Act 1959	Sections 37 to 43.
7 & 8 Eliz. 2. c. 72	Mental Health Act 1959	Sections 45 to 60.
7 & 8 Eliz. 2. c. 72	Mental Health Act 1959	Sections 62 to 68.
7 & 8 Eliz. 2. c. 72	Mental Health Act 1959	Sections 70 to 76.
7 & 8 Eliz. 2. c. 72	Mental Health Act 1959	Sections 80 and 81.
7 & 8 Eliz. 2. c. 72	Mental Health Act 1959	Section 85.
7 & 8 Eliz. 2. c. 72	Mental Health Act 1959	Section 87.
7 & 8 Eliz. 2. c. 72	Mental Health Act 1959	Sections 89 and 90.
7 & 8 Eliz. 2. c. 72	Mental Health Act 1959	Sections 92 to 96.
7 & 8 Eliz. 2. c. 72	Mental Health Act 1959	Sections 99 to 119.
7 & 8 Eliz. 2. c. 72	Mental Health Act 1959	Sections 121 to 126.
7 & 8 Eliz. 2. c. 72	Mental Health Act 1959	Sections 129 and 130.
7 & 8 Eliz. 2. c. 72	Mental Health Act 1959	Sections 132 and 133.
7 & 8 Eliz. 2. c. 72	Mental Health Act 1959	Sections 135 to 141.
7 & 8 Eliz. 2. c. 72	Mental Health Act 1959	In section 144, in subsection (1), paragraph (b).
7 & 8 Eliz. 2. c. 72	Mental Health Act 1959	Section 145(2).
7 & 8 Eliz. 2. c. 72	Mental Health Act 1959	Sections 147 and 148.
7 & 8 Eliz. 2. c. 72	Mental Health Act 1959	Section 149(3) to (5).
7 & 8 Eliz. 2. c. 72	Mental Health Act 1959	In section 150, the words from " section ten " to " section one hundred and forty one " and from "section one hundred and forty six " to " Schedules ".
7 & 8 Eliz. 2. c. 72	Mental Health Act 1959	In section 152, the words from " sections eighty-five" to " Northern Ireland by that section ", from " section one hundred and twenty-nine " to " Schedules " and the words "Part II of the Seventh Schedule; Part 11 of the Eighth Schedule ".
7 & 8 Eliz. 2. c. 72	Mental Health Act 1959	Section 153.
7 & 8 Eliz. 2. c. 72	Mental Health Act 1959	Schedule 1.
7 & 8 Eliz. 2. c. 72	Mental Health Act 1959	Schedule 3.
7 & 8 Eliz. 2. c. 72	Mental Health Act 1959	Schedule 5.
7 & 8 Eliz. 2. c. 72	Mental Health Act 1959	Schedule 6, except paragraph 15(4).
7 & 8 Eliz. 2. c. 72	Mental Health Act 1959	In Schedule 7, in Part 1 the entry relating to sections 48 and 49 of the Fines and Recoveries Act 1833 and in Part 11 the entries relating to the Polish Resettlement Act 1947 and the USA Veterans' Pensions (Administration) Act 1949.
1960 c. 61	Mental Health (Scotland) Act 1960	Section 74.
1960 c. 61	Mental Health (Scotland) Act 1960	In Schedule 4, all the entries relating to the Mental Health Act 1959 except those relating to section 9 and Schedule 7.
1961 c. 15 (N.I.)	Mental Health Act (Northern Ireland) 1961	In Schedule 5, paragraphs 1 to 4.
1964 c. 84	Criminal Procedure (Insanity) Act 1964	Section 4(7).
1965 c. 2	Administration of Justice Act 1965	In Schedule 1, the entry relating to the Mental Health Act 1959.
1968 c. 20	Courts-Martial (Appeals) Act 1968	In Schedule 4, the entry relating to the Mental Health Act 1959.
1968 c. 49	Social Work (Scotland) Act 1968	In Schedule 8, paragraphs 48 and 49.
1969 c. 46	Family Law Reform Act 1969	In Schedule 1 the entries relating to the Mental Health Act 1959.
1969 c. 54	Children and Young Persons Act 1969	In Schedule 5, paragraphs 38 to 40.
1969 c. 58	Administration of Justice Act 1969	Sections 17 to 19.
1970 c. 42	Local Authority Social Services Act 1970	In Schedule 1, the entry relating to the Mental Health (Amendment) Act 1982.
1971 c. 23	Courts Act 1971	In Schedule 8, paragraph 38. In Part I of Schedule 9, the entry relating to the Mental Health Act 1959.
1971 c. 77	Immigration Act 1971	In section 30(2), the words from " and accordingly" onwards.
1972 c. 70	Local Government Act 1972	In Schedule 23, in paragraph 9, in sub-paragraph (1) the words " 35, 56(2)(c) and 56(3) ", in sub-paragraph (2) the words " 10(1), 22, 27(2), 33, 34, 38(3), 40 to 43, 47(2), 52, 53, 59, 60" and "132", sub-paragraphs (4), (5) and (6).
1973 c. 29	Guardianship Act 1973	In section 1(8), the words from "and" to the end of the subsection.
1975 c. 37	Nursing Homes Act 1975	In Schedule 1, paragraphs 1 to 4.
1977 c. 45	Criminal Law Act 1977	In Schedule 6, the entry relating to section 130(3) of the Mental Health Act 1959.
1977 c. 49	National Health Service Act 1977	In section 105(3), the words "or the Mental Health Act 1959".
1977 c. 49	National Health Service Act 1977	In Schedule 15, paragraphs 23, 26 to 28, 30, 31 and 33.
1978 c. 29	National Health Service (Scotland) Act 1978	In paragraph 10(b) of Schedule 15, the figure" 102".
1980 c. 5	Child Care Act 1980	In Schedule 5, paragraphs 13 and 14.
1980 c. 43	Magistrates' Courts Act 1980	In Schedule 7, paragraphs 31 and 32.
1980 c. 53	Health Services Act 1980	In Schedule 1, paragraph 13.
1981 c. 45	Forgery and Counterfeiting Act 1981	Section 11(1).
1981 c. 54	Supreme Court Act 1981	Section 144.
1981 c. 54	Supreme Court Act 1981	In Schedule 5, paragraphs 2 and 3 of the entry relating to the Mental Health Act 1959.
1981 c. 54	Supreme Court Act 1981	In Schedule 6, paragraph 4.
1981 c. 61	British Nationality Act 1981	In section 39(7) the words " section 90 of the Mental Health Act 1959 and ".
1982 c. 51	Mental Health (Amendment) Act 1982	Sections 1 to 33.
1982 c. 51	Mental Health (Amendment) Act 1982	Sections 35 to 61.
1982 c. 51	Mental Health (Amendment) Act 1982	In section 63, subsection (1) and in subsection (2) the words from the beginning to " Act and ".
1982 c. 51	Mental Health (Amendment) Act 1982	Section 64(1), (2), (3), (5) and (6).
1982 c. 51	Mental Health (Amendment) Act 1982	Section 66.
1982 c. 51	Mental Health (Amendment) Act 1982	Section 68(2) and (3).
1982 c. 51	Mental Health (Amendment) Act 1982	Section 69(2), (3), and (4).
1982 c. 51	Mental Health (Amendment) Act 1982	In section 70(2), the words " sections 35(1) and (2) and 64(6) above extend to Northern Ireland ".
1982 c. 51	Mental Health (Amendment) Act 1982	Schedule 1.
1982 c. 51	Mental Health (Amendment) Act 1982	In Schedule 3, in Part I paragraphs 1 to 26, in paragraph 35 sub-paragraph (a), paragraphs 40, 42, 45 and 46, in paragraph 50 sub-paragraph (a), in paragraph 51 sub-paragraph (a), paragraphs 52 to 55, 57 and 58 and Part II.
1982 c. 51	Mental Health (Amendment) Act 1982	In Schedule 5, paragraphs 2 to 15.

=== Territorial extent ===
England and Wales: The entire Act applies to England and Wales.

Northern Ireland: Only the parts of the act defined in s.147 have effect in Northern Ireland. The care of mentally disordered people in Northern Ireland is covered by the Mental Health (Northern Ireland) Order 1986, as amended by the Mental Health (Amendment) (Northern Ireland) Order 2004.

Scotland: Only the parts of the act defined in s.146 have effect in Scotland. The care of mentally disordered people in Scotland is covered by the Mental Health (Care and Treatment) (Scotland) Act 2003.

== See also ==
- Fixated Threat Assessment Centre
