= Chalton Street Market =

Street market in Camden, London, England

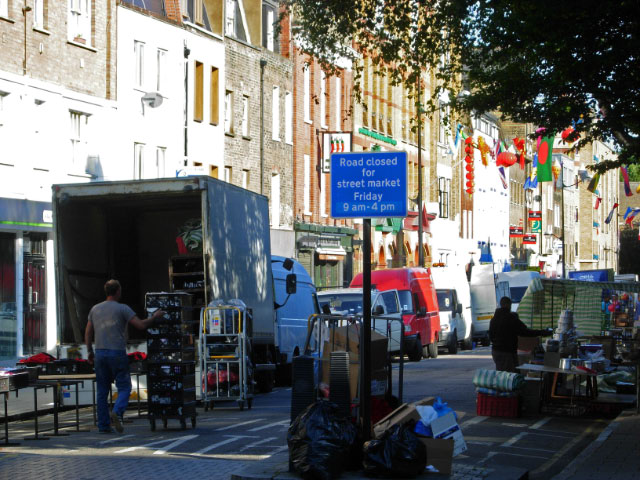
- Chalton Street Market in 2009
- Location: Chalton Street; Somers Town, Camden, Greater London; 51.528705°N 0.129149°W
- Opening date: 1795 (231 years ago)
- Management: Camden London Borough Council
- Owner: Camden London Borough Council
- Environment: Outdoor
- Goods sold: Fashion, Food, Household Goods
- Days normally open: Friday
- Website: camden.gov.uk/markets
- Location within London Borough of Camden

Chalton Street Market is a street market in Camden, North London.

== History ==
=== Early history (1795–1867) ===
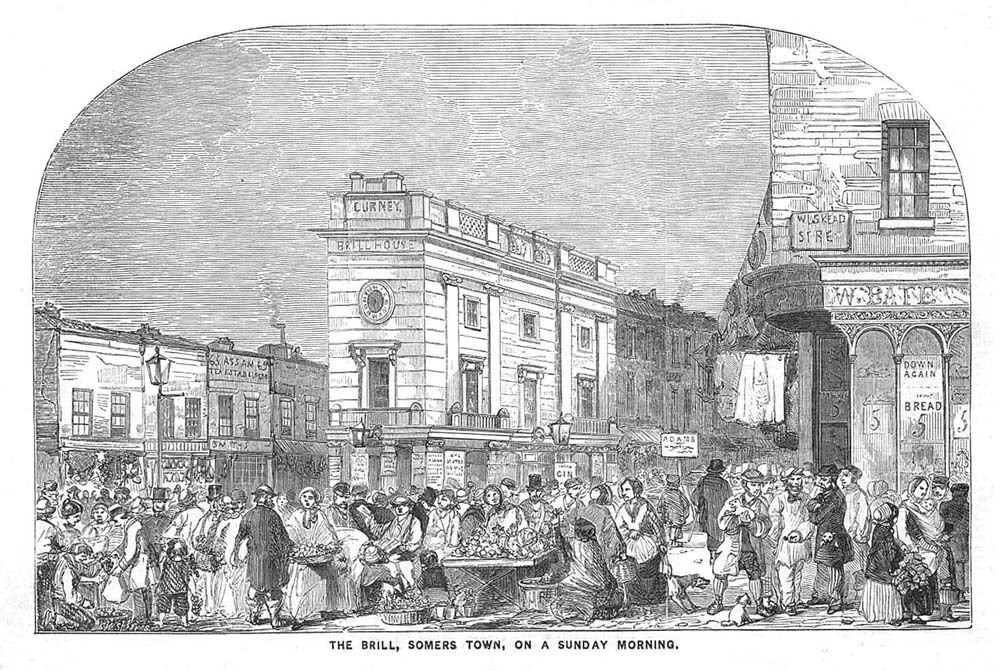
The Brill Market in Somers Town, London—1858

Established circa 1795 (as The Brill).

In 1784 the first housing was built at Somers Town, London and by 1795 the streets around the market were fully laid out. The Market probably started at this time. Less than sixty years later Henry Mayhew lists a 300 pitch market at the Brill and on Chapel Street, the second largest street market in London after Hampstead Road and Tottenham Court Road.

The market was named The Brill after the Brill House tavern at the western end of the street. The area had been known for dog fighting and bull-baiting but the housing development and market chased these entertainments away:

As the philanthropic or curious visitor enters Skinner Street, about eleven o’clock some bright Sunday morning, his ears will be greeted, not by the barking of dogs and the roaring of infuriated bulls, as of old, but by the unnaturally loud cries of men, women, boys, and girls, anxious to sell edibles and drinkables—in fact, everything which a hard-working man or poor sempstress is supposed to need in order to keep body and soul together.

— Edward Walford, Old and New London,

Chapel Street is now an access way through Levita House and continues west into Drummond Crescent as Churchway. Half of Chapel Street and, at its eastern end, the Brill House are now beneath the site of the British Library.

Mayhew describes a market selling fruit & veg, confectionery, meat and fish, as well as crockery, clothing, and stationery.

Unregulated street markets allowed London to grow explosively in the late nineteenth and early twentieth century. The traders could move easily to the new population centres and enabled people to buy provisions without having to travel to the central London wholesale markets. In the early morning traders would load their barrows at the wholesale markets, clean and sort the goods, and then sell them in the new suburban streets. In many cases, the sites of these markets became London's modern high streets.

=== Management by the police (1867–1927) ===
In 1867, section six of the Metropolitan Streets Act effectively prohibited street trading. Following public meetings and press criticism, the act was amended within weeks. Section one of the Metropolitan Streets Act Amendment Act 1867 exempted traders but they were now subject to regulation by the police.

By 1887 the former site of the market had been demolished to make way for the Midlands Railway Good Depot:

The Brill has been swept away by the Midland Railway Company, but the hucksters have taken possession of the neighbouring streets, and Somers Town is almost as crowded and noisy as ever on Saturday nights.

In 1893, Chalton Street Market is described as comprising 97 stalls on a Friday and 32 on a Saturday selling food as well as clothing and second-hand goods.

Henry Croft, the founder of the tradition of Pearly Kings and Queens was born in St Pancras Workhouse, Somers Town in 1861. Though he was a road sweeper rather than a costermonger, his colourful style of raising money for charity has influenced cockney market traders down to this day illustrated by a parade of Pearly Kings and Queens at the opening ceremony for the 2012 Summer Olympics.

=== Management by local councils (1927–present) ===
==== Metropolitan Borough of St Pancras (1927–1965) ====
The London County Council (General Powers) Act 1927 replaced police regulation with a new licensing regime administered by metropolitan borough councils. From 1927 to 1965 the market was managed by the Metropolitan Borough of St Pancras.

Benedetta's The Street Markets of London makes only a passing reference to Chalton Street indicating that it was now trading on weekdays only with mostly fruit and vegetables to purchase.

==== London Borough of Camden (1965–present) ====
In 1965 the Borough of St Pancras was abolished and its area became part of the London Borough of Camden.

By the early 1980s the market was only trading on Fridays and the fruit and vegetables have been replaced by clothing, jewellery, and secondhand books. The market appeared to be struggling with most occupied pitches being towards the southern end of the market closest to Euston Road.

In the 1990s the market was again open from Monday to Friday with the number of stalls being about 25 on the busiest day, Friday. The goods on offer are described as household goods, tinned food, and clothing.

Since 1998 the START (Somers Town Art) Festival of Cultures has been held on the second Saturday in July, on the site of the market. It is the biggest street festival in the Camden borough and attracts about 10,000 people, bringing together the area's diverse cultural communities.

== Modern market ==
The Market is in operation on Fridays from 10:30 am to 3pm between the junction of Chalton Street and Weir's Passage in the South and the junction of Chalton Street and Phoenix Road in the North with a small number of stalls selling clothing, household goods, and fresh food. Licences to trade are issued by Camden London Borough Council.

== Transport ==
=== Bus ===
Bus Routes 30, 73, 91, 205, and 390 serve Euston Road from the stop outside of the British Library. Bus Routes 168 and 253 serve Euston Station.

=== Railway and tube ===
The nearest stations are Euston railway, Euston tube, Euston Square, King's Cross railway, King's Cross tube, and St Pancras railway station.
