= Freebairn =

Freebairn is a surname. Notable people with the surname include:

- Alfred Robert Freebairn (1794–1846), English engraver
- John Freebairn (1930–2016), Australian politician
- Kate Freebairn, Australian journalist and television news presenter
- Robert Freebairn (1765–1808), British landscape painter
- Stu Freebairn (1932–2025), New Zealand rugby union player
- Ian Freebairn-Smith (1932–2025), American composer
- Vanessa Freebairn-Smith, American cellist
