= Finden =

Finden is a surname. Notable people with the surname include:

- Edward Francis Finden (1791–1857), British engraver
- William Finden (1787–1852), British engraver
