= St Ann's Hospital =

- North London NHS Foundation Trust
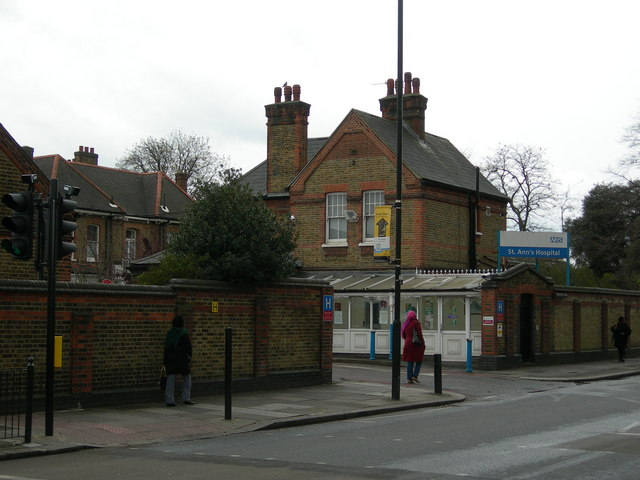
- St Ann's Hospital

- Shown in Haringey

Geography
- Location: South Tottenham, Greater London, England, United Kingdom
- Coordinates: 51°34′50″N 0°05′26″W

Organisation
- Care system: NHS England
- Type: Mixed healthcare campus
- Affiliated university: None

Services
- Emergency department: None

History
- Founded: 1892

Links
- Lists: Hospitals in England

St Ann's Hospital is a mixed healthcare campus in South Tottenham in the London Borough of Haringey, England, and is part of North London NHS Foundation Trust.

== History ==
The Metropolitan Asylums Board purchased the site where St Ann's Hospital now stands in August 1892. The hospital, which was initially known as the North Eastern Fever Hospital and treated patients suffering from fever and diphtheria, opened in October 1892. Building work on the administration block began in 1898 and construction of the laundry began the following year.

The Metropolitan Asylum Board was liquidated in 1929 and the hospital came under the administration of London County Council in 1930. At the time of transfer to the hospital had 661 beds and the medical superintendent was FH Thompson MD, CM, DPH, the Matron was Miss A Evans and the steward was HP Austin.

The hospital joined the National Health Service in 1948 under the management of the Tottenham Hospital Management Committee, part of the North East Metropolitan Regional Hospital Board. The hospital was renamed St Ann's General Hospital in 1951. It came under the responsibility of Haringey Health Authority in 1982 and transferred to the management of Barnet, Enfield and Haringey Mental Health NHS Trust in 2001.

Following the merger of Barnet, Enfield and Haringey Mental Health NHS Trust and Camden and Islington NHS Foundation Trust in November 2024, the hospital was brought under the management of the North London NHS Foundation Trust.

Nurses' badge

== See also ==
- Healthcare in London
- List of hospitals in England
