= James Mitan =

British engraver

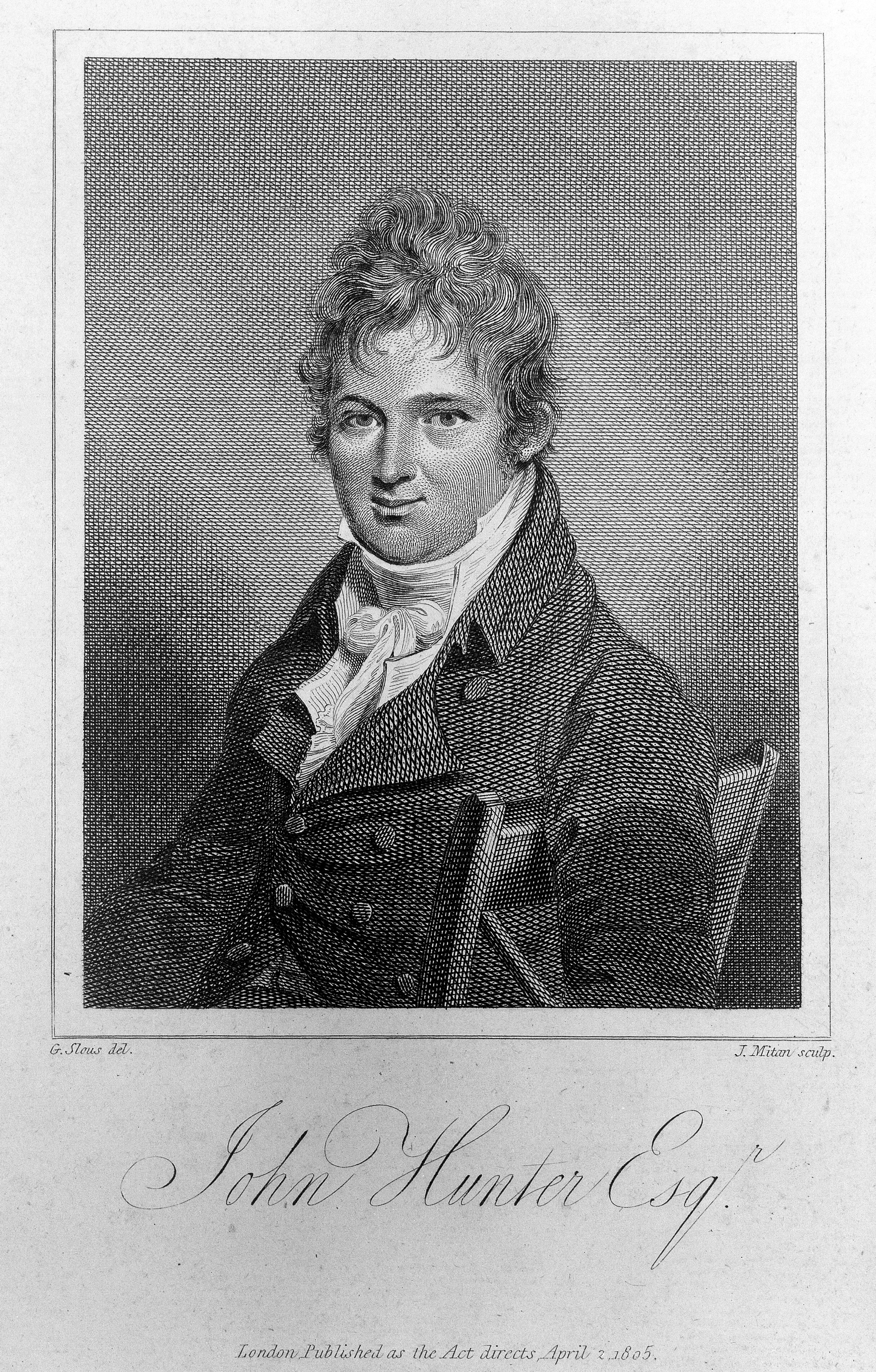
John Hunter, stipple engraving by James Mitan, 1805, after G. Slous

James Mitan (13 February 1776 – 16 August 1822) was a British engraver.

== Life ==
He was born in London on and educated by his father until the age of ten, when he attended King's Academy, Chapel Street, Soho for two years. In 1790 he was articled to a writing engraver named Vincent, but also obtained instruction from John Samuel Agar and Thomas Cheesman, studied in the schools of the Royal Academy, and made copies of Francesco Bartolozzi's tickets. His articles expired in 1797.

Mitan died of paralysis at 63 Warren Street, Fitzroy Square, London, on 16 August 1822, leaving his wife Charlotte (daughter of William Gowing, a prominent builder who built many of the houses in Charlotte Street and its neighbourhood in the 1770s and 1780s), and family.

== Works ==
Mitan became a line engraver, mainly of book illustrations; he usually worked for other engravers, so that plates bearing his own name are not numerous. Publications he worked on include:

- Elizabeth Inchbald's British Theatre 1806–9;
- John Sharpe's British Poets and British Classics;
- Bannatyne's edition of Shakespeare;
- Thomas Moore's Irish National Airs (after Thomas Stothard), 1818;
- Thomas Frognall Dibdin's Bibliographical Tour through France and Germany, 1821, and Ædes Althorpianæ, 1822; and
- Charles Jervas's translation of Don Quixote (after Robert Smirke), 1825.

A set of 56 small plates of natural history engraved by Mitan, perhaps from his own designs, was published in 1822. Between 1802 and 1805 he exhibited a series of compositions illustrating George Moore's gothic novel Theodosius de Zulvin at the Royal Academy, and in 1818 showed a design for a national memorial of the battle of Waterloo. In 1818 he also made a design, 18 feet long, for a chain bridge over the River Mersey. Mitan worked for the Admiralty and the Freemasons. A plate of Charles Robert Leslie's 'Anne Page and Slender,' which Mitan left unfinished, was completed by Francis Engleheart and published in 1823.

His students included his brother Samuel Mitan, the brothers William Finden and Edward Francis Finden, and Alfred Robert Freebairn.

== Family ==
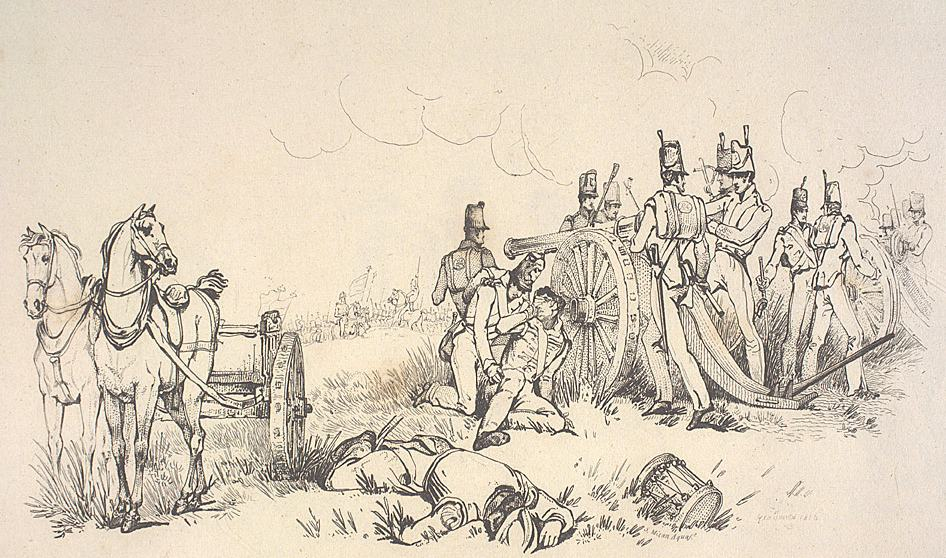
Artillery at the Battle of Waterloo, engraving by Samuel Mitan after George Jones

Samuel Mitan (1786–1843) was the brother and pupil of James Mitan, and engraver in the same style. He made plates for Robert Batty's French Scenery, 1822, and was employed by Rudolph Ackermann. He became a member of the Artists' Annuity Fund in 1810, and died at the Polygon, Somers Town, 3 June 1843.

While the Dictionary of National Biography states that nothing is known of his family, it appears that James and Samuel (with sisters Maria and Frances) were children of (Tobias) William Mitan (1744-1809) & Elizabeth (née Jenison) (c.1749-1813) and were a quite prominent Catholic family. Tobias' father William (c.1720-1802) was probably born in Yorkshire.

== Notes ==
Attribution

This article incorporates text from a publication now in the public domain: Lee, Sidney, ed. (1894). "Mitan, James". Dictionary of National Biography. Vol. 38. London: Smith, Elder & Co.
