= John Henning (1771–1851) =

Scottish sculptor (1771–1851)

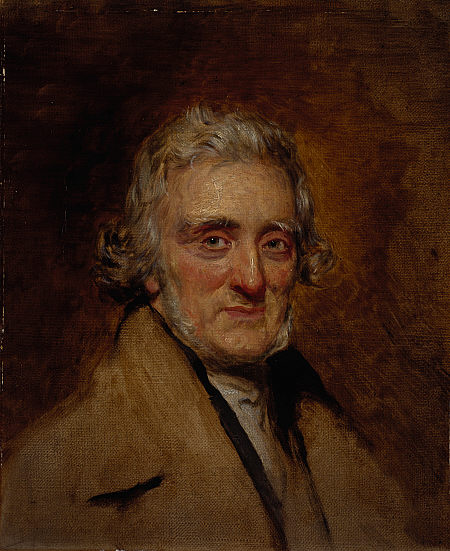
- John Henning by Robert Scott Lauder
- Born: 1771; Paisley
- Died: 1851 (aged 79–80)
- Education: self-taught
- Spouse: Catherine Sunter
- Children: five

John Henning (2 May 1771 – 8 April 1851) was a Scottish sculptor who began his career as a carpenter. His masterpieces were the one-twentieth-scale models he created of the Parthenon and Bassae friezes. These took him twelve years to complete. Many others then copied this idea but he could not copyright the work of a long-dead artist, and could do nothing to prevent this.

== Biography ==
Henning was born in Paisley the son of Samuel Henning a carpenter and builder. He trained in wood-carving under his father.

He was noted for his ability as a sculptor when he created cameos of his friends and family. After marrying Catherine Sunter when aged 28 and encouraged by his early cameos he went into business in Glasgow and then Edinburgh attracting clients that included Sir Walter Scott. Josiah Wedgwood was impressed by his work and agreed to champion them for Henning. In 1810 he is listed as a "portrait modeller" living at 48 Rose Street in the First New Town in Edinburgh just north of Princes Street.

In 1811, John and Catherine moved to London where Henning saw the newly arrived Elgin Marbles in Burlington House and persuaded Lord Elgin to allow him to draw and copy them. It was said that a commission from Princess Charlotte of a portrait medallion inspired Henning to realise that he could use his drawings to create slate moulds that could be used to reproduce the friezes in miniature. Henning also took advantage of his sittings with the Princess to introduce her to more radical reading. This task was to last twelve years although Henning decided to also add the Bassae frieze to his work, and this did not arrive in England until a few years into his work. One miniature version of the Parthenon frieze was just two inches high, but over twenty four feet long.

By 1820, Henning was ready to sell his work and it was obvious that he had not copied the remains of the friezes, but recreated them. In the case of the Parthenon frieze he had used drawings taken by William Pars in 1765, the drawings commissioned from Feodor Ivanowitsch by Lord Elgin before they were moved to England and importantly drawings made by Jacques Carrey. The last drawings were not the most detailed, but importantly they were made thirteen years before the explosion that had damaged the Parthenon in 1687.

One copy of the miniature Parthenon frieze was sold to William IV for £42 in 1821 but its location is not known. He failed to gain a copyright on this work and others profited by making copies. Very few original copies of these miniatures are known to exist.

In 1827, Henning and his son created sculptures in the style of the Parthenon frieze for a screen erected at Hyde Park Gate in London. The following year, John Jr. confirmed that he would recreate a copy of the Parthenon frieze for London's Athenaeum Club. Although only just over half the length of the 524 feet long original this model was at the correct scale and was constructed from Bath stone in agreement with Decimus Burton, the club's architect.

Henning also made half-scale models which he hoped to reproduce for more modest buildings. Henning found that they were very popular but the business was captured across Europe by others who had unauthorised copies of his work. Equally distressing to Henning was the low quality of some of the copies. Because of this Henning became a supporter of the emerging laws on copyright but also was unhappy that his success was going unrewarded.

In 1845, Henning again invested his time based around the friezes. This time he intended to recreate the two friezes as engravings. Trial proofs were made but unfortunately his partner in the enterprise, Alfred Robert Freebairn (1794–1846), died before either of the works were completed. Henning died on 8 April 1851, two years after his wife. He was buried as a pauper in Finchley Churchyard.

== Legacy ==
Henning's original slate models were obtained by the British Museum in 1938. The Athenaeum Club and the screen at Hyde Park are extant. Copies of Henning's work are still being discovered.

== Family ==
Henning's eldest son John Henning (1801-1857) was also a sculptor. He won the Society of Art's Silver Isis Medal for a relief entitled "The Good Samaritan". In 1825 he was commissioned to repair the statue of Queen Anne in front of St Paul's Cathedral. In 1836 he created the figurative panels on the front of Manchester Art Gallery.

Samuel Henning (c.1802-1832) aided his father in the restoration of the Elgin Marbles. He designed the tomb of Duncan Sinclair in Kensal Green Cemetery. He died of cholera during the epidemic of 1832.

Another son Archibald Skirving Henning became an artist and he has a few paintings in public collections in the United Kingdom. Archibald died aged 59 in Manchester in 1864. He was named after the Scottish artist Archibald Skirving.
