= Chalton Street =

Street in London, England

Coordinates: 51.5316°N 0.1322°W

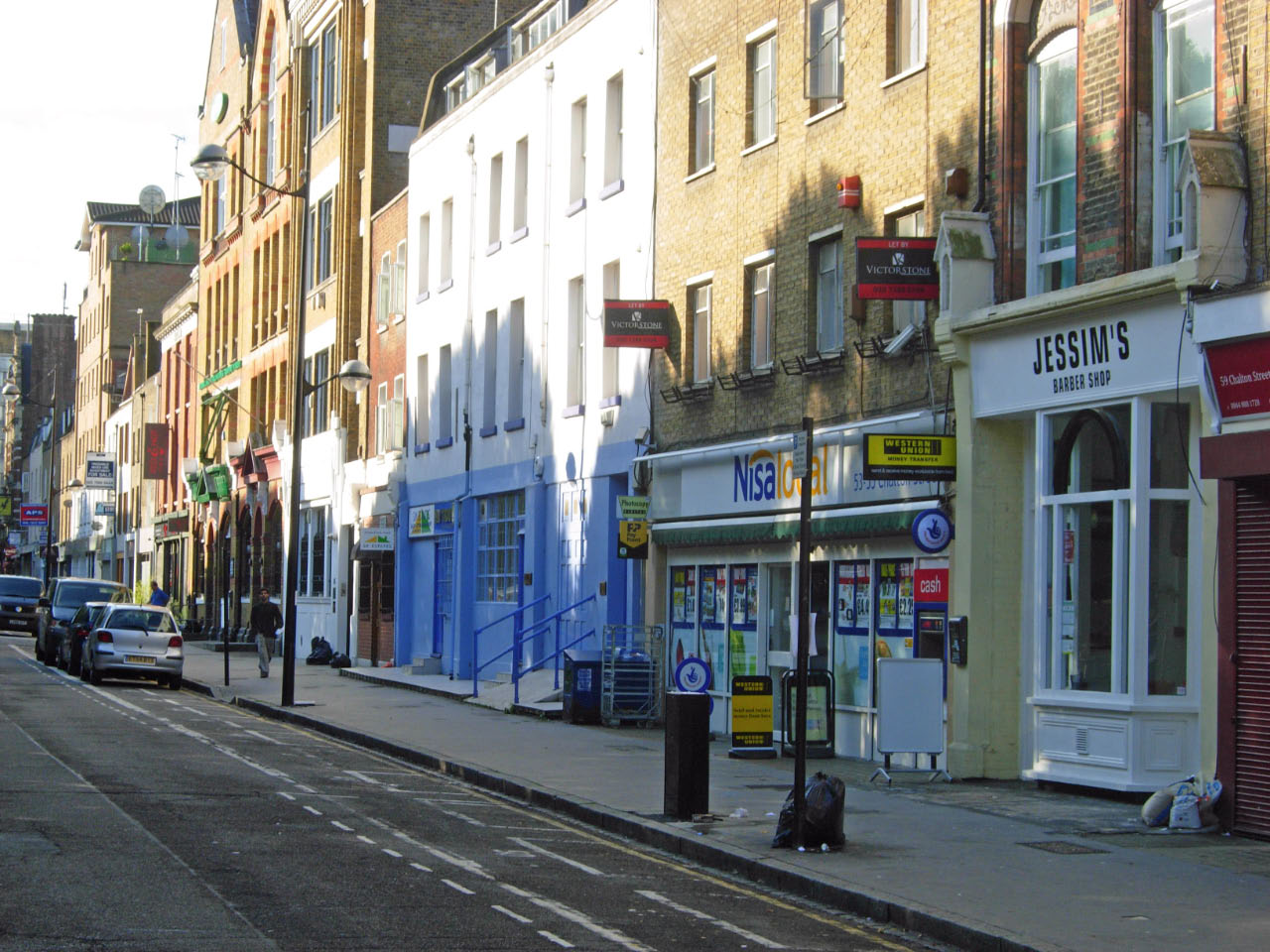
Chalton Street shops

Chalton Street is a street in the Somers Town neighbourhood of London, England. Chalton Street is two-thirds of a mile long and stretches from Euston Road almost to Camden Town, before taking a hard right turn and terminating at St Pancras Hospital.

The street defines the centre of Somers Town. It is notable as the home of Chalton Street Market. It lies directly to the east of Euston railway station, with Euston underground station having been built on Chalton Street. The southern part of the eastern side of Chalton Street is dominated by the Ossulston Estate. The street is also home to Regent High School.

The Ossulston Estate, including Chamberlain House, Levita House and Walker House is all grade II-listed, as are The Somers Town Coffee House (actually a pub, despite the name) and The Cock Tavern, which are attached to it.
