= Kingsley Martin =

British journalist and editor (1897–1969)

- Born: Basil Kingsley Martin; 28 July 1897; Hereford, England
- Died: 16 February 1969 (aged 71); Cairo, Egypt
- Education: Magdalene College, Cambridge
- Occupations: Journalist and editor
- Relatives: Irene Barclay (sister)

Basil Kingsley Martin (28 July 1897 – 16 February 1969), usually known as Kingsley Martin, was a British journalist who edited the left-leaning political magazine the New Statesman from 1930 to 1960.

== Early life ==
Martin was the son of (David) Basil Martin (1858–1940), a Congregationalist minister, and his wife, Alice Charlotte Turberville, daughter of Thomas Charles Turberville of Islington, born on 28 July 1897 in Ingestre Street, Hereford; Irene Barclay was his elder sister. His father had been minister at the Eign Brook Chapel since 1893; located on Eign Street, Hereford, it subsequently became the Eignbrook United Reformed Church. Martin was a principled socialist and pacifist, and was unpopular in the city.

Martin was a day boy at Hereford Cathedral School, where he was unhappy. The family then moved in 1913 to Finchley, London. Basil Martin took up a place at Finchley Unitarian Church, where his pacifism made him somewhat isolated. Martin did not move directly to London. He was first sent on a sea voyage to South Africa, for his health. He stayed with his maternal uncle Frank Turberville on a farm near Grahamstown, now Makhanda, Eastern Cape, returning to his family in January 1914.

== Conscientious objector ==
Martin then went to Mill Hill School, under its head John Mclure. He entered the Sixth Form: in the "classical sixth" he pursued a traditional course of Latin and Greek. At the outbreak of World War I he was aged 17, and not in the best of health. He did not join the school's Officers' Training Corps (OTC); but his close friend Thomas Applebee, a year older, did, was conscripted, and was killed in 1916 a few days after arriving in France.

Taking inspiration from his father's opposition to the Second Anglo-Boer War, which had put him at the risk of violent attack, Martin adopted an attitude of non-resistance and declared himself a conscientious objector. At the age of 18, he was required to appear before a Conscientious Objectors Tribunal. He presented in evidence a letter from the head of the school OTC, and his father spoke to the tribunal. He was granted exemption from military service.

School life was then made intolerable for Martin, however, by the other boys. He decided to join the Friends' Ambulance Unit. He was sent for initial training to Jordans, Buckinghamshire. He then spent an extended period at the Star and Garter Hospital, Richmond. From January 1917 he worked as an orderly at Uffculme Hospital in Birmingham, making a further appearance before a tribunal and being granted a conditional exemption from conscription. By June he was with the Ambulance Unit in northern France.

== Post-war period ==
In 1919, Martin attended a socialist summer school, where he gained an interest in guild socialism from G. D. H. Cole and his wife Margaret. That autumn he entered Magdalene College, Cambridge. He gained a double first in two parts of the Historical Tripos, and his college awarded him a bye-fellowship, which he used to visit Princeton University for a year. He joined the Union of Democratic Control: a 1921 revival meeting he organised, addressed by Norman Angell, was broken up by students.

At this period, according to C. H. Rolph, Martin was strongly influenced by Goldsworthy Lowes Dickinson. In February 1922 he attended a socialist conference at Dunsford. Others there included Bertrand Russell, a domineering Beatrice Webb with Sidney Webb and Barbara Drake, Hugh Dalton, Eric Blair (before he became George Orwell), Harold Laski, Barbara Wootton and Eileen Power. He supported Dalton, who was Labour candidate in the March 1922 Cambridge by-election. In 1924, Martin was offered a teaching job at the London School of Economics, under Laski. He remained there for three years, and then took a position as a leader writer at the Manchester Guardian. He left in part because he had been clashing with William Beveridge, the director of the School.

== Editor of the New Statesman ==
Martin became editor of the New Statesman at the beginning of 1931. He remained at the New Statesman until 1960, when he retired.

=== Circulation and influence ===
The circulation of the Statesman grew from 14,000 to 80,000 over the course of Martin's thirty years in the editor's chair. It was renamed New Statesman and Nation after absorbing The Nation and Athenaeum in 1931. This operation was integral to Martin's appointment: he had won over Arnold Rowntree, the major backer for the new single left-of-centre journal, and Rowntree had insisted that Martin should be a director. In 1934, it took over the Week-end Review owned by Samuel Courtauld, through the good offices of Gerald Barry, gaining about four thousand readers. The magazine became a significant influence on Labour Party politics on the left and further to the left.

=== Political line ===
Martin wrote after the 1938 Anschluss: "Today if Mr. Chamberlain would come forward and tell us that his policy was really one not only of isolation but also of Little Englandism in which the Empire was to be given up because it could not be defended and in which military defence was to be abandoned because war would totally end civilization, we for our part would wholeheartedly support him." Martin later abandoned this position.

Martin and the Statesman were criticised for pursuing an erratic response to the regime of Joseph Stalin in the Soviet Union. Martin's friend John Maynard Keynes complained that in regard to Stalin's Russia, Martin was "a little too full perhaps of goodwill. When a doubt arises it is swallowed down if possible." Martin wrote a hostile account of Leon Trotsky, "Trotsky in Mexico" for the New Statesman, and did not allow the magazine to review Trotsky's anti-Stalinist book The Revolution Betrayed.

Martin became disillusioned with the Soviet Union after the Hitler–Stalin Pact, which he denounced; in response the Communist Party Daily Worker ran an editorial attacking Martin. He supported the policy of demanding an unconditional surrender from Nazi Germany After attending the Soviet-sponsored World Congress of Intellectuals for Peace in Wrocław, Poland, in 1948, Martin wrote a hostile account of it, entitled "Hyenas and other Reptiles". In 1964, Martin joined the Who Killed Kennedy? Committee set up by Bertrand Russell.

=== Dispute with Orwell ===
Martin's editorship resulted in what D. J. Taylor called a "titanic feud" with contributor George Orwell. Returning to the UK after fighting in the Spanish Civil War, Orwell contacted Martin and offered to give him an account of the conflict; however, Martin rejected Orwell's first article, "Eyewitness in Spain", on the grounds it could undermine the Spanish Republicans. As compensation, Martin then offered Orwell a chance to review Franz Borkenau's book The Spanish Cockpit. Martin and the literary editor Raymond Mortimer turned down the review on the grounds that "it is very uncompromisingly said and implies that our Spanish correspondents are all wrong", and that it was more a restatement of Orwell's opinions than a review.

Mortimer later wrote to Orwell to apologise for the rejection of his articles on Spain, stating: "There is no premium here on Stalinist orthodoxy." Orwell continued to write for the New Statesman but made "wounding remarks" in his journalism about the magazine being "under direct communist influence" and its readers being "worshippers of Stalin". Orwell's list of fellow travellers, passed in 1949 to the Information Research Department, a branch of UK intelligence, included Martin's name and described him as "Decayed liberal. Very dishonest."

== Works ==
- The Triumph of Lord Palmerston: A Study of Public Opinion in England Before the Crimean War (1924; revised 1963)
- The British Public and the General Strike (1926)
- French Liberal Thought in the Eighteenth Century: A Study of Political Ideas from Bayle to Condorcet (1929; revised 1954)
- Low's Russian Sketchbook (1932), illustrator David Low
- The Magic of Monarchy (1937) put forward arguments for British Republicanism. It was later described by Brian Pearce as an "excellent account".
- Propaganda's Harvest (1941)
- Truth and the Public (1945), Conway Memorial Lecture
- The Press the Public Wants (1947)
- Harold Laski, 1893-1950: A Biographical Memoir (1953)
- New Statesman Profiles (1957), editor
- The Vital Letters of Russell, Krushchev, Dulles (1958), editor
- Critic's London Diary: From the "New Statesman" 1931-1956 (1960)
- The Crown And The Establishment (1962) argued again for republicanism. It caused controversy, with Gerald Nabarro condemning Martin's views on the monarchy as "scurrilous".
- Father Figures: A First Volume of Autobiography 1897-1931 (1966), autobiography vol. 1. In a review, Margaret Cole described Martin as a "wonderfully good editor".
- The Bedside Guardian 16: A Selection from the Guardian 1966-1967 (1967), editor
- Editor: A Second Volume of Autobiography 1931-45 (1968), autobiography vol. 2
- Kingsley Martin: Portrait and Self-Portrait (1969), edited by Mervyn Jones

== Personal life and views ==
Martin married in 1926 Olga Walters, daughter of Frederick Rufenacht Walters, a physician and medical officer of health who ran a sanatorium at Tongham; they divorced in 1940. Martin then became romantically involved with the activist Dorothy Woodman. They remained together for the rest of his life, although they never married. They worked together in pressure groups such as the Union of Democratic Control and the Campaign for Nuclear Disarmament.

Martin died in the Anglo-American Hospital, Cairo, on 16 February 1969, after a heart attack. He was an active and longtime humanist. After his death, the editor of Humanist News wrote that "Kingsley Martin was through and through a Humanist and a life-long champion of Humanist causes. As a speaker, a contributor to Objections to Humanism and to The Humanist Outlook, he showed his constant readiness to serve and promote humanism."

Media offices
Preceded by Charles Mostyn Lloyd	Editor of the New Statesman; 1930–1960	Succeeded by John Freeman
