= William Skinner of Corra =

Scottish lawyer and author

William Skinner of Corra WS FRSE DL JP (1823–1901) was a 19th-century Scottish lawyer and author. He was Town Clerk of Edinburgh from 1874 to 1895.

== Life ==
He was born on 26 July 1823, the son of John Robert Skinner WS and his wife, Ann Black. The family lived at 3 Roxburgh Place in Edinburgh's South side.

William was educated at Edinburgh Academy. He was then apprenticed as a lawyer to John Hunter WS at 47 George Street in Edinburgh's New Town.

In 1848, he qualified as a Writer to the Signet and joined his father at 2 Elder Street.

In 1852, he set up his own practice at 12 Forth Street in the New Town.

From 1874, he served as Town Clerk for Edinburgh, serving consecutively the Lord Provosts: Sir James Falshaw, Sir Thomas Jamieson Boyd, Sir George Harrison, Sir Thomas Clark, Sir John Boyd of Maxpoffle, Sir James Alexander Russell and Sir Andrew McDonald.

In 1876, he was elected a Fellow of the Royal Society of Edinburgh. His proposers were Philip Kelland, John Hutton Balfour, Robert Christison, and Arthur Mitchell.

On 31 August 1877, he wrote to Ulysses S. Grant to confer upon him the Freedom of the City of Edinburgh (in his capacity as Town Clerk).

He died at 35 George Square on 4 May 1901.

== Family ==
In 1850, he married Johann (Ann) Farish Kirk (d.1866) daughter of Robert Kirk of Drumstinchnell. They were parents to the eminent accountant William Henry Kirk Skinner (WHKS) and at least three other sons.

In 1880, he married Charlotte Eremengarde Warren (d.1931) of Market Drayton.

His brother Hercules Skinner was a Captain in the East India Company in Bengal.

== Publications ==
- Edinburgh Municipal and Police Act 1879
