= North London NHS Foundation Trust =

NHS foundation trust in London, England

- Type: NHS foundation trust
- Established: 1 November 2024
- Headquarters: St Pancras Hospital
- Hospitals: St Pancras Hospital, Chase Farm Hospital, St Ann's Hospital
- Chief executive: Jinjer Kandola
- Staff: 6,000
- Website: www.northlondonmentalhealth.nhs.uk

North London NHS Foundation Trust (NLFT) is an NHS foundation trust which provides community and mental health services in the London Boroughs of Barnet, Enfield, Haringey, Camden and Islington.

== History ==
The trust was established on 1 November 2024 by the merger of Barnet, Enfield and Haringey Mental Health NHS Trust and Camden and Islington NHS Foundation Trust. The 2024 merger was intended to improve consistency between the boroughs. The new trust had a combined annual budget of £670 million and employs about 6,000 staff.

On 9 April 2025 it was announced that the trust would merge with The Tavistock and Portman NHS Foundation Trust by April 2026, bringing the post-merger trust's scale up to £740m with 6,800 staff. The 2026 merger was intended to improve mental health services.
