= Basil Jellicoe =

Church of England priest (1899-1935)

- Born: 5 February 1899; Chailey, Sussex
- Died: 24 August 1935 (aged 36); Uxbridge
- Occupations: Church of England priest, housing reformer

John Basil Lee Jellicoe (5 February 1899 – 24 August 1935) was a priest in the Church of England best known for his work as a housing reformer.

== Early life and education ==
John Basil Lee Jellicoe was born in Chailey, Sussex on 5 February 1899, the eldest son of Bethia Theodora and Thomas Harry Lee Jellicoe. His father was rector of St Peter's Chailey, and a cousin of John Jellicoe, 1st Earl Jellicoe. His maternal grandfather was Sir John Boyd, of Maxpoffle, Roxburgh, lord provost of Edinburgh from 1888 to 1891. Jellicoe was educated at Haileybury and Imperial Service College. A graduate of Magdalen College, Oxford, he later studied at St. Stephen's House, Oxford and was ordained as an Anglican priest.

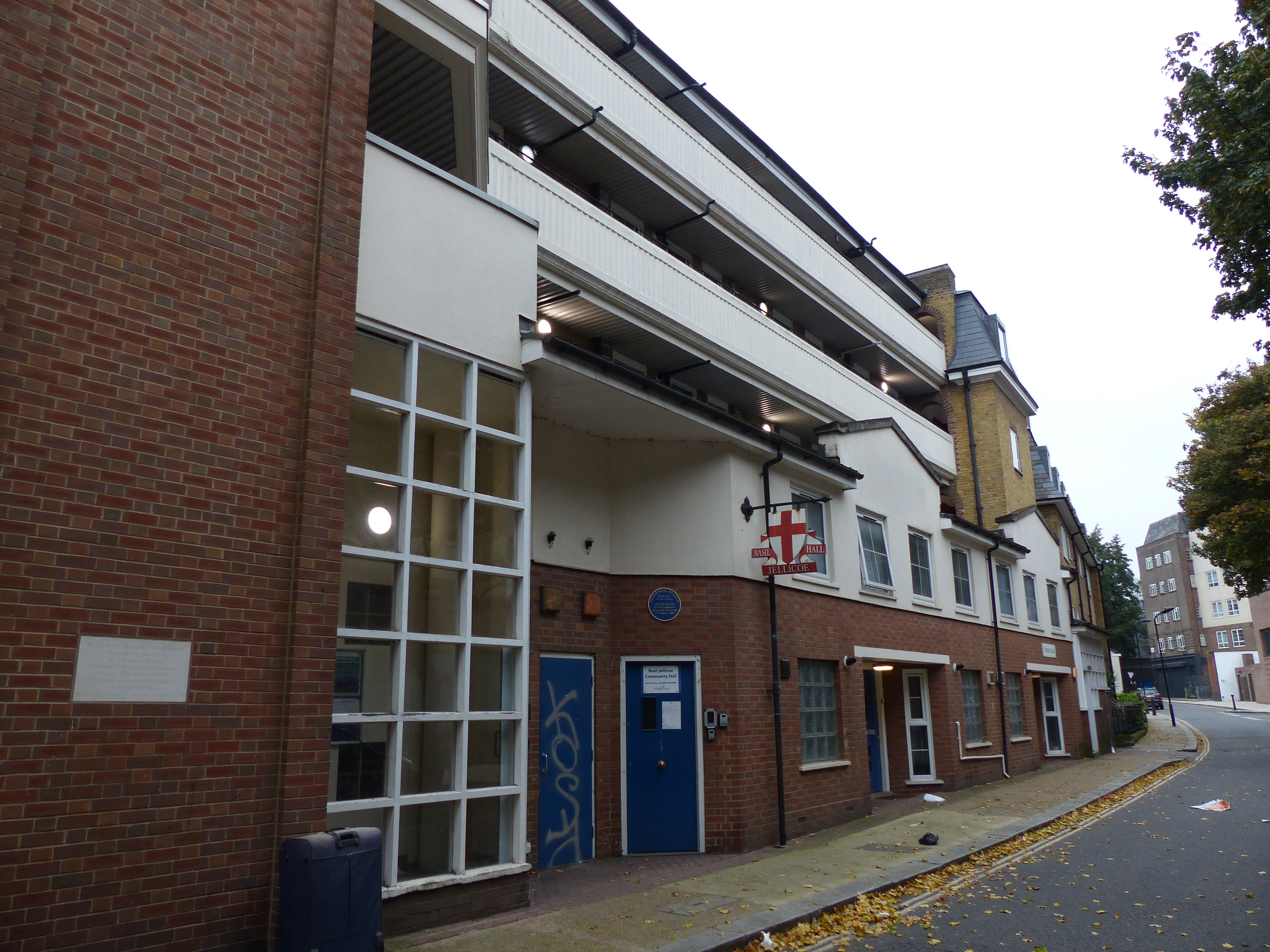
Basil Jellicoe Hall

== Career ==
Jellicoe became Missioner at the Magdalen College Mission run by the College in the parish of St Mary's Church in Somers Town, London, then an area of exceptional overcrowding and poverty between Euston and St Pancras main line railway stations.

In 1924, he was founder of the St Pancras Housing Association (originally the St Pancras House Improvement Society), run for many years by Irene Barclay as the honorary secretary. He also founded several other housing associations in East London, St Marylebone, Kensington, Sussex and Cornwall. He toured the country in his small car fundraising and selling loan stock to fund these projects.

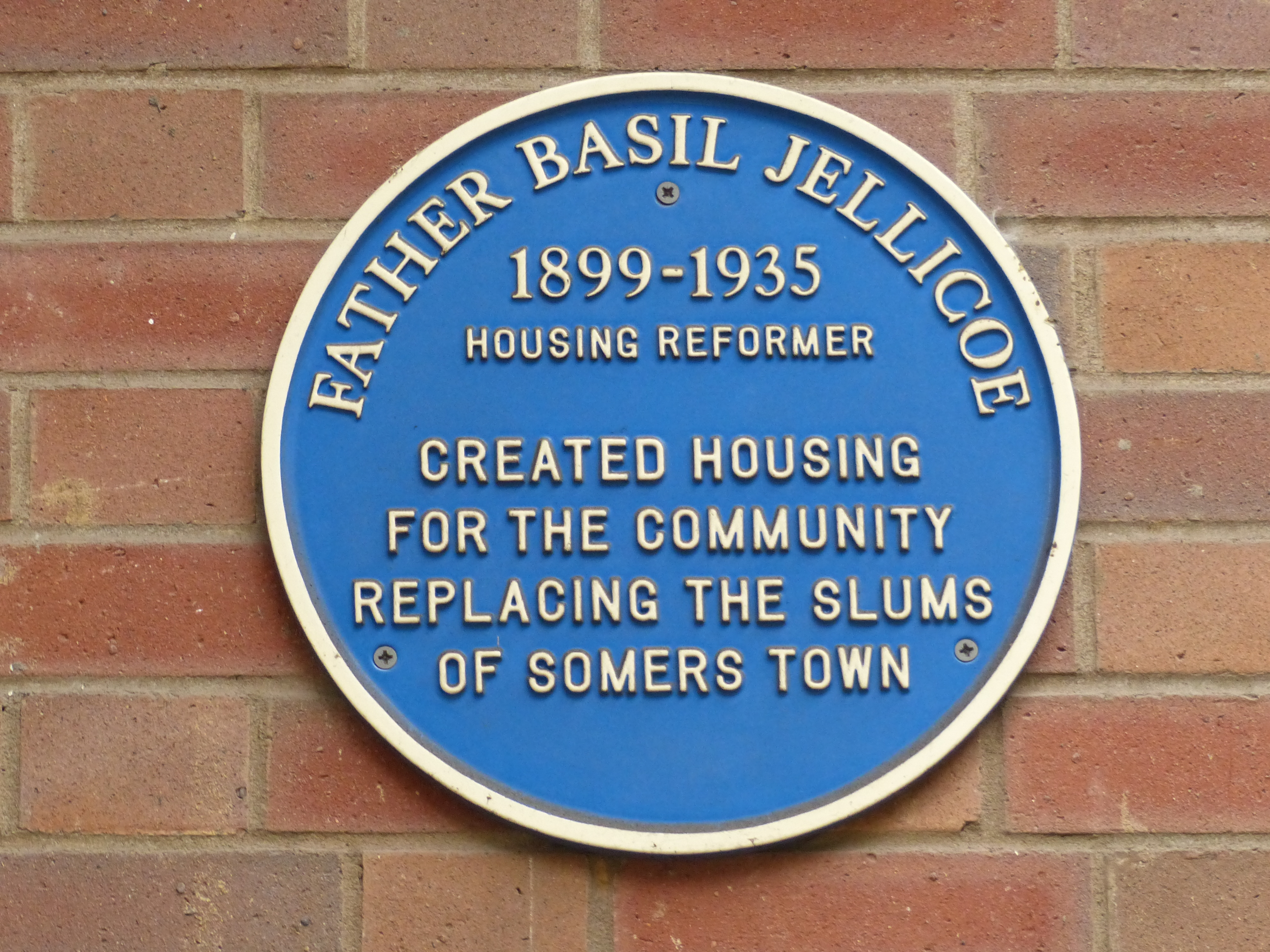
Father Basil Jellicoe plaque

Basil Jellicoe died in Uxbridge on 24 August 1935, aged only 36, after suffering ill heath for a decade.

== Commemoration ==
A plaque was unveiled in his honour in Camden in 2014.

He is commemorated in the Diocese of London with a memorial day on 24 August. The annual Jellicoe Sermon at Magdalen College is named in his honour.

A video of Jellicoe interacting with Londoners in a pub in 1930 is available online through the University of South Carolina Library's digital archive.

== Sources ==
- Dictionary of National Biography entry
- The Jellicoe Society
