= Douglas Cowper =

British painter (1817–1839)

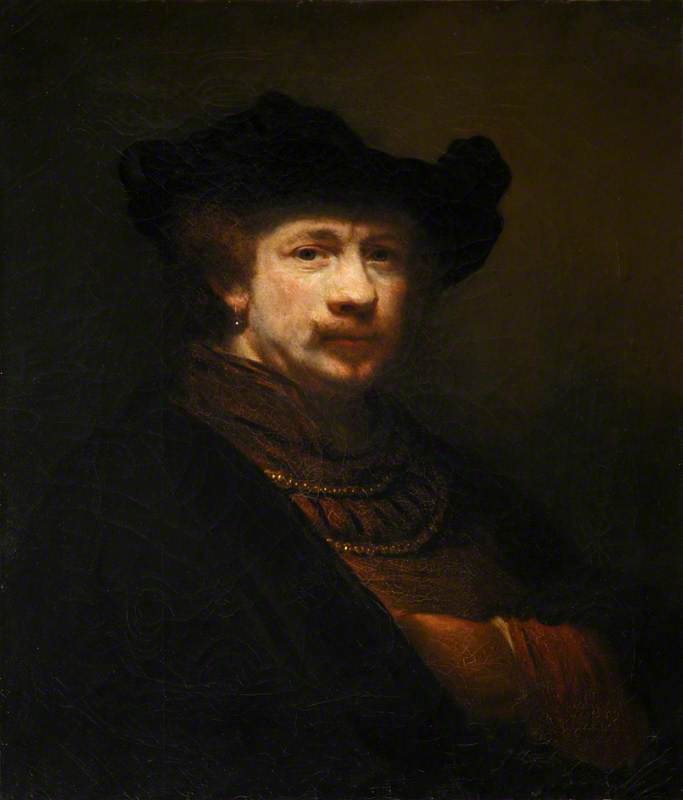
- Born: 30 May 1817; Gibraltar
- Died: 28 November 1839 (aged 22)

Douglas Cowper (30 May 1817 – 28 November 1839) was a British painter.

== Life ==
Born at Gibraltar, he was third son of a merchant there, who later moved to Guernsey. There Cowper copied the pictures that were to be found in the island. He went to London, and, after lessons from Henry Sass, entered the Royal Academy schools. He gained the first silver medal, for the best copy of Nicolas Poussin's Rinaldo and Armida in the Dulwich Picture Gallery. He earned a livelihood by portrait painting.

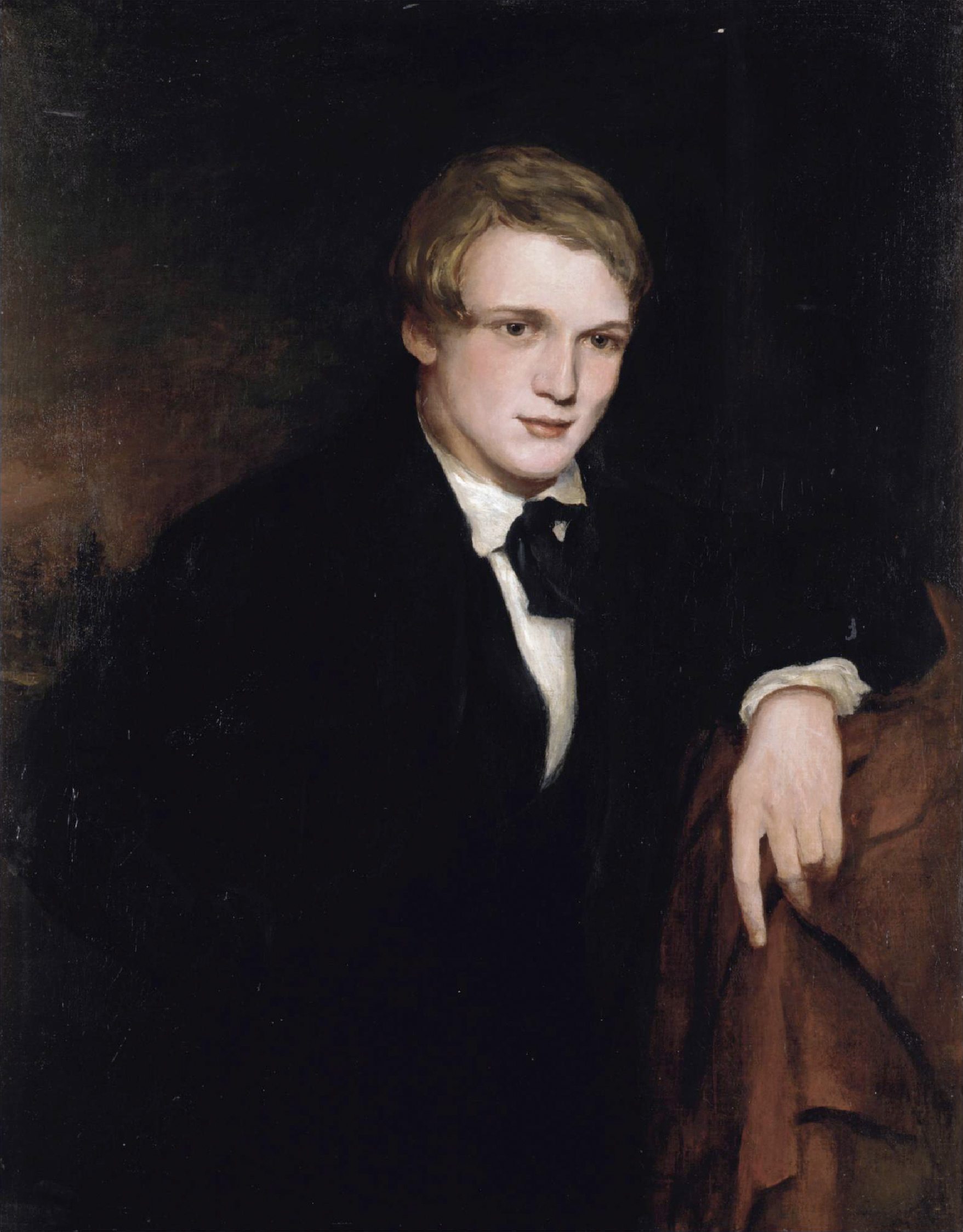
Portrait of William Powell Frith.

In 1838 he began to show signs of tuberculosis, which increased in 1839. After a visit to the south of France he returned to Guernsey, and died on 28 November 1839.

== Works ==
In 1837 Cowper exhibited at the Royal Academy The Last Interview, followed in 1838 by Shylock, Antonio, and Bassanio. In 1839 he showed Kate Kearney (engraved by John Porter), Othello relating his Adventures (engraved by Edward Finden), and A Capuchin Friar. He also exhibited at the British Institution and the Society of British Artists.
