= Irene Barclay =

British surveyor (1894–1989)

- Born: Irene Martin; 27 May 1894; Hereford
- Died: 21 March 1989 (aged 94); Canada
- Occupation: chartered surveyor
- Known for: First woman to qualify in Britain as a chartered surveyor

Irene Barclay (née Martin, 27 May 1894 – 21 March 1989) was the first woman to qualify in Britain as a chartered surveyor, and was a noted campaigner for social housing.

== Early life and education ==
Irene Turberville Martin was born on 27 May 1894 in Hereford, the eldest of four children of Alice (née Turberville) and Basil Martin. Her father was a socialist and pacifist Congregationalist minister. Her younger brother was Kingsley Martin, long-time editor of the New Statesman.

She gained a 1st class degree in History in 1916, followed by a Diploma in Social Science, both at Bedford College, London.

Following the passage of the Sex Disqualification Removal Act 1919 she was able to sit her final exams with the College of Estate Management (now the University College of Estate Management) in 1922. Barclay was at the time of her qualification working for the Crown Estate as housing manager, managing its working class housing estates near Regent's Park.

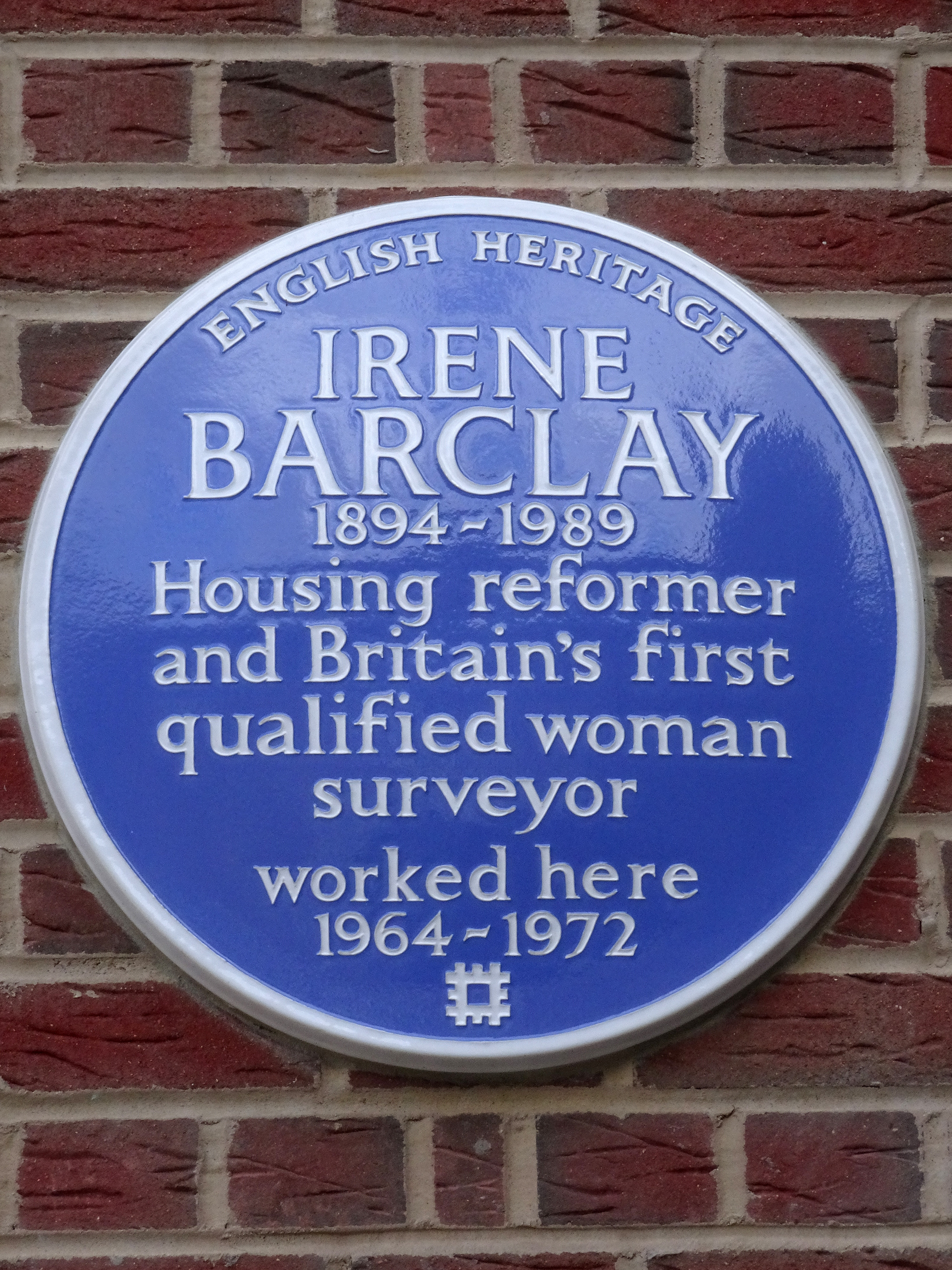
English Heritage blue plaque honouring Irene Barclay

== Career ==
Barclay established a surveying practice with professional partner Evelyn Perry, who qualified the year after her. Barclay and Perry traded until 1940. Irene continued to practise until 1972, marking 50 years in the profession.

Although Barclay had a general surveying practice she is best known for the work her firm did for the St Pancras House Improvements Society (later St Pancras Housing Association) of which she was secretary. This was founded in Somers Town by the Anglican priest Basil Jellicoe and Barclay provided it with stability over her long tenure as its Secretary. The Association later worked elsewhere in North London and Barclay was always a consultant, never employee of the Association. Her pioneering social and housing surveys in the 1920s drew the attention of the middle classes to the plight of slum dwellers including Somers Town, Pimlico, North Kensington and Edinburgh as described in her memoirs, combining physical survey of the properties such as disrepair and lack of amenities with human aspects such as tenure, rents and overcrowding. Barclay, who has been described as ‘Irene, the patron of the poor’, was appointed an OBE in 1966 for her significant and valuable work as a social reformer.

Barclay subsequently played a leading role in the foundation of a number of housing associations in the 1920s and 1930s, including Kensington Housing Trust, Stepney Housing Trust, Isle of Dogs Housing Society and Bethnal Green Housing Society. Most of these were established on the basis of her surveys of property and housing conditions. Barclay was also a founding member of the Association of Women Housing Workers which later merged into what is today the Chartered Institute of Housing.

== Personal life ==
She married John Barfield Barclay (c. 1897–1966), sometime staff member of the Peace Pledge Union and of International Help for Children. They had two sons, born in 1926 and 1929.

On retirement Barclay went to live in Canada, where she died on 21 March 1989. An obituary described her as ‘one of the most influential social reformers of the 20th century’.

== Commemoration ==
Irene Barclay is commemorated in the Somers Town Mural in Camden and Irene Barclay House is at 152 Eversholt House, London NW1. Her entry in the Oxford Dictionary of National Biography was published in 2019. Barclay was one of the recipients of an English Heritage blue plaque in 2024, alongside Christina Broom, Diana Beck and Adelaide Hall. Her plaque was unveiled at 1A St Martin's House, Polygon Road, Somers Town, Camden, NW1 1QB in May 2024, marking the site of her office in the 1960s and 1970s when she was Estates Manager and Honorary Secretary of the St Pancras House Improvement Society Limited.
