= Guy-Toussaint-Julien Carron =

French Roman Catholic priest (1760–1821)

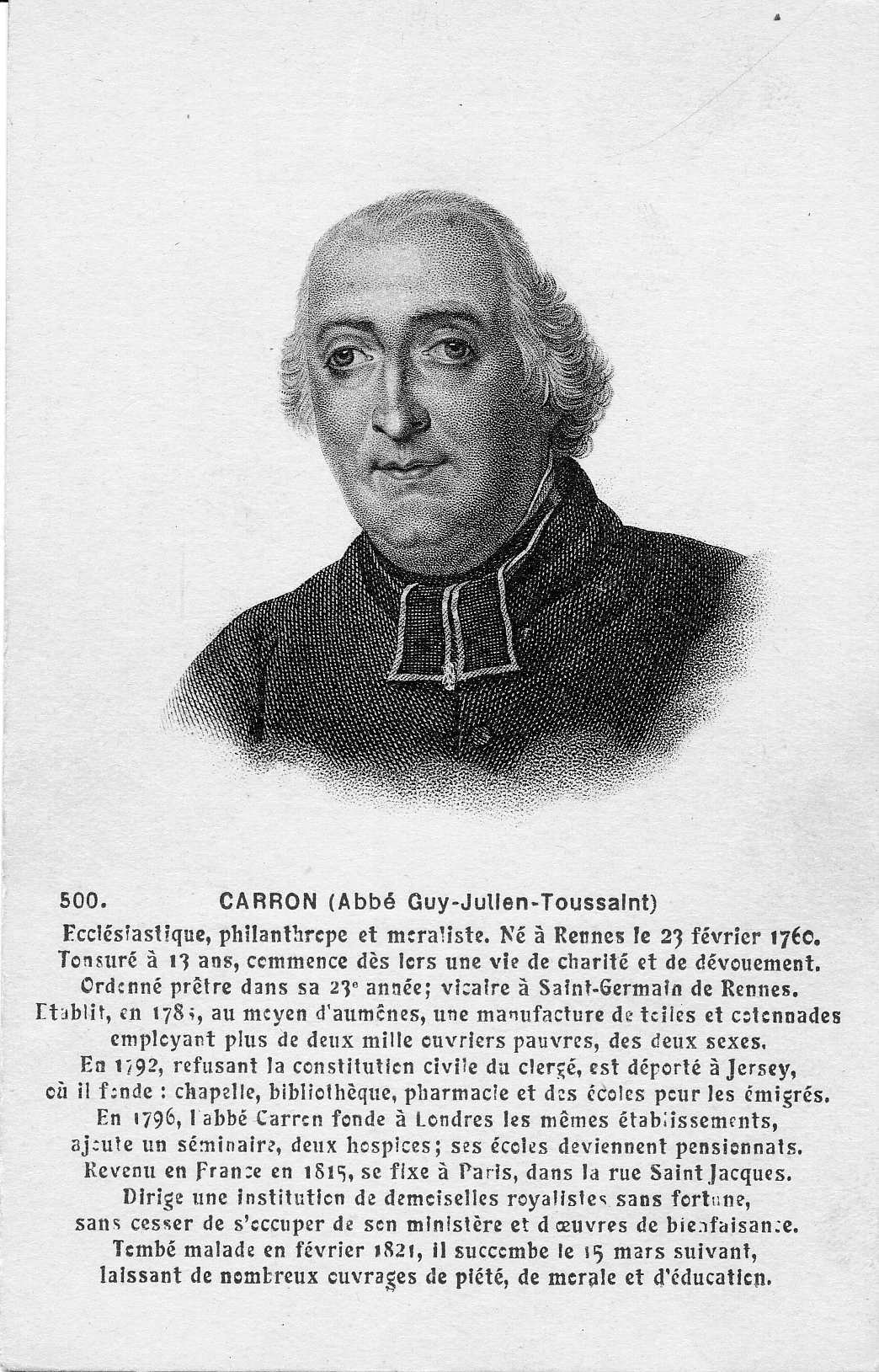
Abbé Carron, postcard F. Château

Abbé Guy-Toussaint-Julien Carron (1760–1821) was a French Roman Catholic priest who founded a number of social and educational institutions, especially while in exile in England, and was a prolific author of pious tracts.

== Life ==
Born in Rennes, Carron received was tonsured at the age of thirteen. In 1785, having been profoundly affectedby the poverty throughout his province, he conceived the idea of erecting an institution of charity, for which he interested a number of noble families, who contributed large sums to the execution of his plan; so that in 1791 in the city of Rennes, he came into possession of cotton spinning mills, weaving establishments, etc., which occupied more than two thousand working people of both sexes, under his direction. He also founded an institution for young women trying to escape a life of prostitution. However, in 1790, following the French Revolution, he became a non-juror, refusing to swear to the Civil Constitution of the Clergy, and was imprisoned.

In 1792, he was deported to Jersey where he founded schools, libraries and pharmacies for fellow French Catholics who had fled the Revolution. He resettled in Somers Town, London and established many educational and social institutions to support his community, winning the personal thanks of Louis XVIII.

On the Bourbon Restoration in 1814, Carron returned to France and became head of the Institut de Marie-Thérèse, a charity founded for children whose families had lost their fortunes during the Revolution.

He published many pious and religious works which were very popular in their time. Carron died in Paris March 15, 1821.

== Bibliography ==
=== By Carron ===
- Carron, G.-T.-J. (1816) Les Écoliers vertueux, ou Vies édifiantes de plusieurs jeunes gens proposés pour modèles, Lille Vanackere
- — (1820a) Les Confesseurs de la foi dans l'Église gallicane à la fin du XVIIIe siècle, ouvrage rédigé sur des mémoires authentiques
- — (1820b) Le modèle des prêtres, ou vie de J. Brydayne, missionnaire, Rusand
- — (1822) Nouveaux Justes dans les conditions ordinaires de la Société, ou vies de Mlle Victoire Conen de Saint-Luc, décapitée en 1794; du Comte Jean-Baptiste-Ignace-Isidore de Forbin, décédé en 1814; de Mlles Françoise-Marie-Thérèse d'Argent, décédée en 1813; Marie-Amélie Sauvage, en 1817; Céleste-Marie-Claire Mettrie Offray, en 1817; Adélaïde-Marie de Cié, en 1818, Lyon: Rusand
- — (1823) Modèles du clergé, ou Vies édifiantes de Messieurs Frétat de Sabra, évêque de Nantes; Boursoul, prêtre, gardien de l'Hôpital Saint-Yves de Rennes; Beurier, prêtre de la Congrégation des Eudistes; Morel de La Motte, chanoine de l'Eglise de Rennes
- — (1827) Vies des justes dans les plus hauts rangs de la société, Lyon: Rusand

=== About Carron ===
- Bouillet, M.-N.; Chassang, A. (1878). Dictionnaire universel d'histoire et de géographie contenant l'histoire proprement dite, la biographie universelle, la mythologie, la géographie ancienne et moderne (in French). Paris: Hachette.
- Walford, E (1878). Old and New London: Volume 5. pp. 340–55., "Somers Town and Euston Square", date accessed: 29 Jul 2007
