= Sir John Boyd of Maxpoffle =

Scottish businessman & lord (1826–1893)

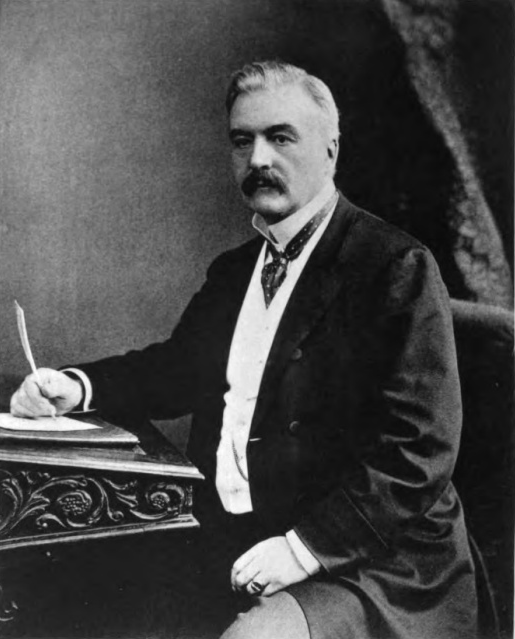
Sir John Boyd, Lord Provost of Edinburgh

Sir John Boyd of Maxpoffle JP (1826–1893) was a 19th-century Scottish businessman who served as Lord Provost of Edinburgh from 1888 to 1891.

== Life ==
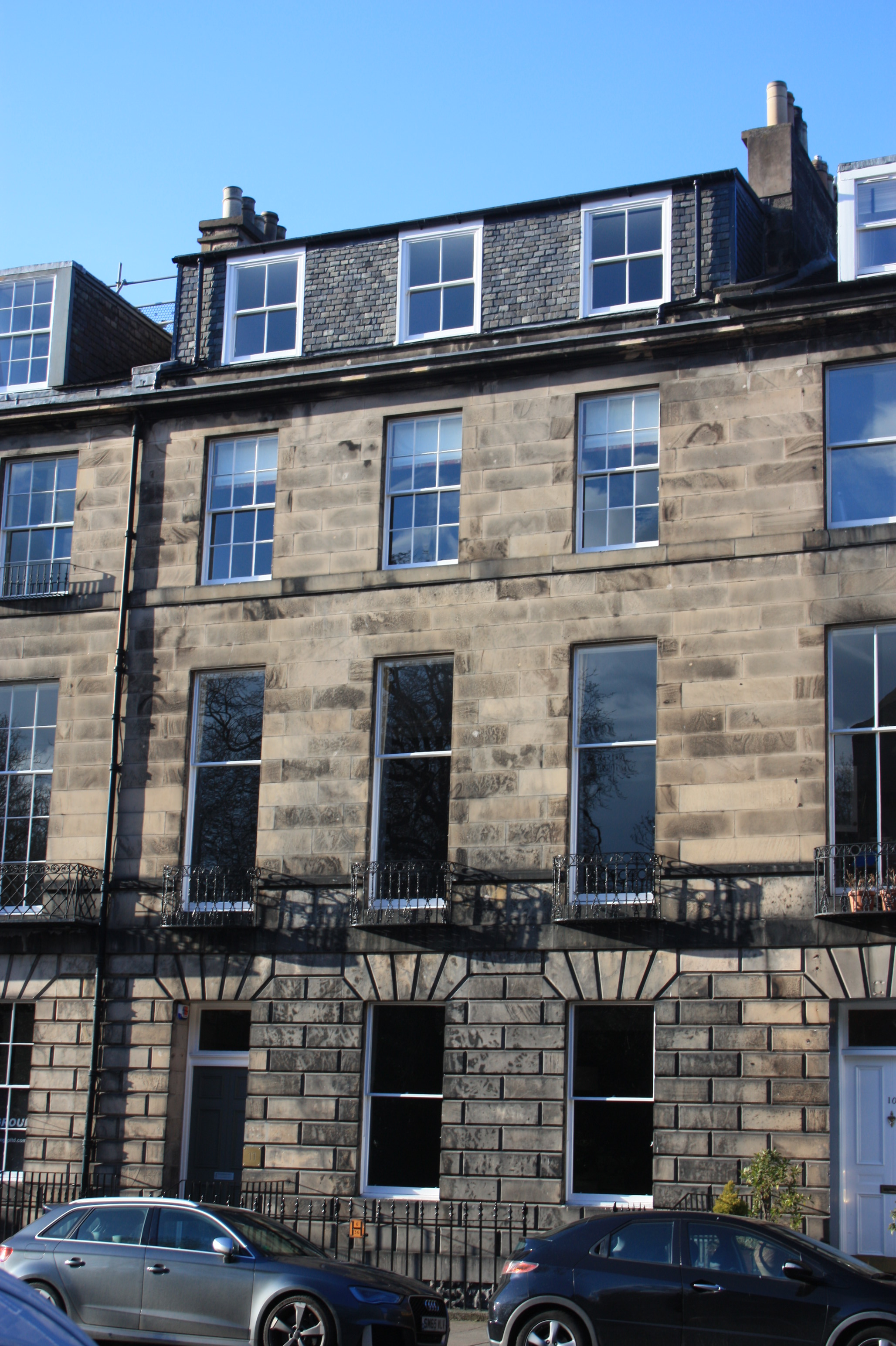
11 Abercromby Place, Edinburgh

He was born in Edinburgh in 1826 and appears to have had multiple careers from house agent to upholsterer and even an undertaker. He had premises at 2 York Place.

He joined Edinburgh Town Council in 1881 and became Lord Provost in 1888. Whilst Lord Provost he lived at 11, Abercromby Place in Edinburgh's Second New Town. His Town Clerk during office was William Skinner of Corra.

His knighthood and title were conferred by Queen Victoria c.1891. The title "of Maxpoffle" derives from his country property of Maxpoffle House, between Bowden and Newtown St. Boswells in the Scottish Borders. The house was an impressive Scots Baronial mansion.

== Family ==
He was married to Isabella Lawson, daughter of John Lawson WS from Biggar in Peeblesshire.

Their eldest son John Boyd (b. 1856) became an advocate operating from 2 Abercromby Place. He later became Sheriff John Boyd.

A further son, William Boyd (November 25, 1861 - August 29, 1945) was also a lawyer: he married Laura Scotia Crerar (August 1, 1861 - September 4, 1946) of Pictou, Nova Scotia. They lived at 18 Drummond Place, and then 26 Inverleith Place, in Edinburgh. Their only two children, 2nd/Lt. Nigel John Lawson Boyd and Lt. William Noel Lawson Boyd, were killed in the First World War and memorialised in Bowden Kirk in the Scottish Borders with a plaque by Sir Robert Lorimer.

A further son, Rev. Arthur Hamilton Boyd MC TD (b.1869) was a distinguished army chaplain.

Their youngest daughter Bethia Theodora married Thomas Harry Lee Jellicoe, rector of St Peter's Chailey. Their son was Fr. Basil Jellicoe, an Anglo-Catholic "slum priest" and housing reformer.

Boyd died at his country home in Maxpoffle, Roxburghshire on 9 October 1893.
