= Robert Heron (writer) =

Scottish writer

- Born: 6 November 1764; New Galloway, Scotland
- Died: 13 April 1807 (aged 42); London
- Occupation: Writer
- Writing career
- Notable work: The Comforts of Life;

Robert Heron (6 November 1764 – 13 April 1807) was a Scottish writer.

== Life ==
Robert Heron was son of John Heron, a weaver, and was born in New Galloway, Kirkcudbrightshire, on 6 November 1764. He was taught privately by his mother until his ninth year, when he was sent to the parish school, where he displayed such precocity that at the age of eleven he was employed to teach some of the local farmers' children and at fourteen was appointed master of the parochial school of Kelton.

By the end of 1780, he had saved sufficient money to enable him, with the help of his parents, to enter the University of Edinburgh with the view of studying for the church. He supported his studies partly by teaching but chiefly by miscellaneous work for booksellers. In autumn 1789, while a divinity student, he visited Robert Burns, who entrusted him with a letter to a Dr. Blacklock, which he failed to deliver. In a rhyming epistle to Blacklock, Burns attributes Heron's faithlessness either to preoccupation with 'some dainty fair one,’ or to partiality for liquor.

Heron was for some time assistant to a Dr. Blair, but, according to his own statement, all his 'ideas, as well of exertion as of enjoyment, soon became literary.' His first independent literary venture was a small edition in 1789 of Thomson's Seasons, with a criticism on his poetry; a larger edition appeared in 1793. In 1790–1, he announced a course of lectures on the Law of Nature, the Law of Nations, the Jewish, the Grecian, the Roman and the Canon Law, and then on the Feudal Law, intended as an introduction to the study of law, but the scheme was unsuccessful.

His imprudent habits overwhelmed him with debt, and he was thrown into prison by his creditors. On their suggestion, he undertook a History of Scotland for Messrs. Morrison of Perth, who engaged to pay him three guineas per sheet. After making some progress he was liberated from prison on condition of devoting two-thirds of his remuneration to paying 15s. in the pound. The first volume (1794), was nearly all written in gaol. In his preface, he expressed a hope that this would be regarded as some excuse for 'considerable imperfections.' The excuse is naive but all Heron's works bear evident marks of superficial knowledge and hurried composition. The History was completed in six volumes, 1794–9.

In 1798, at the Theatre Royal, Edinburgh, Heron produced a comedy which was condemned before the second act. Attributing its failure to a conspiracy against him, he published it under the title St. Kilda in Edinburgh, or News from Camperdown, a Comic Drama in Two Acts, with a Critical Preface, to which is added an Account of a famous Ass Race (1798); the publication attracted no attention. Returning to New Galloway as a ruling elder, Heron served several years in the General Assembly of the Church of Scotland and frequently spoke with fluency and ability.

In order to obtain more constant literary occupation, he removed in 1799 to London, where he contributed largely to the periodicals, editing the Globe, the British Press, and other newspapers, and acting as a parliamentary reporter. In 1806 he commenced a newspaper entitled The Fame, which proved unsuccessful. Its failure and Heron's improvident habits led to his confinement by his creditors in Newgate prison, where, according to his own statement, he was reduced 'to the very extremity of bodily and pecuniary distress.' On 2 February 1807, from Newgate, he wrote a letter to the Royal Literary Fund, recounting his services to literature, and appealing for aid. He received £20 but this was insufficient to cover his debts. Being attacked by fever, Heron was removed to St Pancras Hospital, where he died 13 April 1807.

== Works ==
Besides the works above mentioned, Heron also published:

1. A translation of Niebuhr's Travels through Arabia, 1792.
2. Elegant Extracts of Natural History, 1792.
3. Arabian Tales, or continuations of Arabian Nights' Entertainments, translated from the French, 4 vols. 1792.
4. Observations made in a Journey through the Western Counties of Scotland in 1792, 2 vols., Perth, 1792; 2nd ed. 1799.
5. General View of the Natural Circumstances of the Hebrides, 1794.
6. Letters which passed between General Dumourier and Pache, Minister of War to the French Republic in 1792, translated from the French, 1794.
7. Information concerning the Strength, Views, and Interests of the Powers presently at War, 1794.
8. A translation of Fourcroy's Chemistry, 1796.
9. An Account of the Life of Muley Liezet, late Emperor of Morocco, translated from the French, 1797.
10. Letter to Sir John Sinclair, bart., on the necessity of an instant Change of Ministry, published under the name of Ralph Anderson, 1797.
11. Scotland Described, Edinburgh, 1797, 12mo.
12. Life of Robert Burns, Edinburgh, 1797 (a work of some value, owing to the writer's knowledge of the south-west of Scotland).
13. A New and Complete System of Universal Geography, to which is added a Philosophical View of Universal History, 4 vols. 1798.
14. Elements of Chemistry, London, 1800.
15. Letter to William Wilberforce, esq., M.P., on the Justice and Expediency of the Slave Trade, and on the best means to improve the Manners and Condition of the Negroes in the West Indies, 1806. An edition of the Letters of Junius, 1802, in Watt's Bibl. Brit. is credited to Pinkerton, but a letter in Notes and Queries, 1st ser. vi. 445, clearly shows that Heron and not Pinkerton was the editor. Pinkerton was, however, the author of Letters of Literature, published under the pseudonym of 'Robert Heron' in 1784.

A manuscript Journal of My Conduct, by Heron, is in the library of the University of Edinburgh (Laing collection). Heron also contributed to the Encyclopædia Britannica, the Edinburgh Magazine, and other periodicals; and was employed by Sir John Sinclair in the preparation of the Statistical Account of Scotland.

== Sources ==
Matthew, H. C. G. (October 2009) [2004]. "Heron, Robert (1764–1807)". Oxford Dictionary of National Biography. Oxford Dictionary of National Biography (online ed.). Oxford University Press. doi:10.1093/ref:odnb/13090. (Subscription, Wikipedia Library access or UK public library membership required.)
