= Antonio Puigblanch =

Spanish philologist and politician

Antoni Puig i Blanch (Catalan pronunciation: [ənˈtɔni ˈputʃ i ˈβlaŋ]; 1755 in Mataró – 1840 in Somers Town), also known as Antonio Puigblanch, was a Spanish philologist and politician. He was living in London during 1815–1820 and 1823–1840. There he published The Inquisition Unmasked (1816), translation of the book that had caused his exile from Spain.

== Biography ==
Puigblanch was born in Mataró (near Barcelona) on February 3, 1775; son of Antoni Puig Bunyol and Cecília Blanch. Being a child he studied in the School of Santa Ana of the Escolapios (Mataró). Later, he was in the carthusian monastery of Montalegre, but for a short time. In 1799 he travelled to Madrid to continue his studies: Philosophy in the College of Santo Tomás de Aquino and ecclesiastic discipline in the Reales Estudios de San Isidro.

In 1807 he won the post of professor of Hebrew in the University of Alcalá de Henares. At this time he publishes Elementos de lengua hebrea (Elements of Hebrew language), where he gathers Francesc Orchell's theories.

During the Spanish War of Independence against the French invasion (1808–1814) the representatives of the Spanish Government escaped to Seville and then to Cádiz. At this time Puigblanch stands out among the liberals, who take advantage of the exceptional circumstances to make political reforms. He defends strongly the abolition of the Inquisition, and he shows his arguments publishing La Inquisición sin máscara (The Inquisition Unmasked; Cádiz, 1811–1813). For this reason, after the return of the king Fernando VII, Puigblanch has to leave Spain in 1815. He establishes in London. There he publishes the English revised edition of his polemic book The Inquisition Unmasked (1816). He begins to write a poem in Catalan about the fight for the freedom, personified in the Castilian War of the Communities (1520–1522), entitled Las Comunitats de Castella. By this Catalan poem, Puigblanch is recognized as the predecessor of the cultural movement called Renaixença.

In 1820-1823 Puigblanch was again in Spain, thanks to the political circumstances (Trienio Liberal). He was member of the Spanish Parliament for Catalonia.

In 1823 he returned to London for good, where he was employed at a press and at a pastry shop. In addition, he gave lessons of Spanish and French.

In 1828 and 1834 he published Opúsculos gramático-satíricos, in which among many other themes, he defends the possibility of constructing a federal Spanish State.

He translated to Spanish the Lectures on the Philosophy of the Human Mind by Thomas Brown, entitled Filosofía del espíritu humano en cien lecciones (1828) and a selection of Sermons by Robert Hall (1764–1831) entitled Sermones entresacados de los que escribió en idioma inglés el Rdo. Roberto Hall (1832).

He left unfinished and unpublished the translation of the Histoire de Gil Blas de Santillane, by Alain-René Lesage.

Antonio Puigblanch died on September 25, 1840, at 51 Johnson Street (now Cranleigh Street), Somers Town, London.

== Works ==
- Elementos de lengua hebrea. Madrid, 1808.
- (As Natanael JOMTOB) La Inquisición sin máscara, o disertación en que se prueban hasta la evidencia los vicios de este tribunal y la necesidad de que se suprima. Cádiz: Imprenta de Josef Niel, 1811.
- The Inquisition Unmasked. London, 1816. (Translation of La Inquisición sin máscara. Cádiz, 1811–1813)
- Opúsculos gramático-satíricos. London: Guillermo Guthrie, 1828. 2nd edition in two volumes, London, 1832.
- Prospecto de la obra... intitulada Observaciones sobre el origen y genio de la lengua Castellana. London, 1828.
- Filosofía del espíritu humano en cien lecciones. London, 1828.
- Sermones entresacados de los que escribió en idioma inglés el Rdo. Roberto Hall. London: J. Hill, 1832.

== Bibliography ==
- ABELLÓ JUANPERE, Joan. Preliminary study to La Inquisición sin máscara (Antonio Puigblanch). Barcelona: Alta Fulla, 1988.
- JARDÍ, Enric. Antoni Puigblanch. Els precedents de la Renaixença. Barcelona: Aedos, 1960.
- RUBIÓ I BALAGUER, Jordi. Història de la literatura catalana, v. III. Barcelona: Abadia de Montserrat, 1986.
