= Joseph Grantham =

British police officer (died 1830)

Police Constable Joseph Grantham (died 1830) was the first police officer to be die whilst on duty in the United Kingdom.

Joseph Grantham was a police officer in the Metropolitan Police Service which had been formally established in 1829. While on duty on 28 June 1830, he intervened in a fight in Somers Town, London, during the altercation Grantham died from a stroke. At his inquest, the jury returned a verdict of "justifiable homicide", possibly due to dislike of the new police force. Grantham was held to have contributed to his own death by "over-exertion in the discharge of his duty".
