= Barnet, Enfield and Haringey Mental Health NHS Trust =

UK public sector healthcare provider in London, England

- Type: Mental health trust
- Disbanded: 1 November 2024
- Headquarters: St Ann's Road, London, N15 3TH
- Budget: £210 million 2017-18
- Chief executive: Jinjer Kandola
- Staff: 3,000

Barnet, Enfield and Haringey Mental Health NHS Trust (BEH) was a large provider of integrated mental health and community health services in North London, providing services across Barnet, Enfield, and Haringey. The trust employed around 3,000 staff and served a population of just over a million. The annual income in 2017-18 was c. £210 million.

The Trust provided specialist mental health services to people living in the London boroughs of Barnet, Enfield and Haringey, and a range of more specialist mental health services to a larger area. These included the North London Forensic Service at Chase Farm Hospital, Eating Disorder Service at St Ann's Hospital, specialist child and adolescent inpatient services at Edgware Community Hospital, and the Halliwick Centre for personality disorders. The organisation also hostsed the National Fixated Threat Assessment Centre, which provides a service for high-profile public figures receiving excessive attention from people. It took over Enfield community services in the Transforming Community Services programme in 2010.

On 1 November 2024, the Trust merged with Camden and Islington NHS Foundation Trust to form North London NHS Foundation Trust.

It sold an 11.24-hectare (27.8-acre) site at St Ann's Hospital in Haringey to Sadiq Khan's Land Fund in May 2018 for £53 million. It will be used for 800 homes.

== Organisation ==
BEH had a board of directors comprising thirteen statutory members including the chairman and chief executive.

The CQC rated BEH in September 2017 as requiring improvement overall with two services; Forensic inpatient/secure wards and Community-based mental health services for older people and 'outstanding'.

== Research ==
In January 2014, the trust was awarded 'university affiliated’ status by Middlesex University which facilitated stronger working relationships between the two organisations, including the opportunity for experienced academics at Middlesex and experienced clinicians within the Trust to co-produce mental health education and research projects which meet the needs of local people.

The trust also had numerous research partners who they worked with on research trials. This included North Central London Research Consortium (NoCLor); National Institute for Health and Care Research (NIHR); North Thames Clinical Research Network (CRN) and UCL Partners.

== Performance ==
The trust's work on promoting the reality of the pressures facing the mental health system has featured in the national media.

Barnet Enfield and Haringey Mental Health NHS Trust won the Health Service Journal's Innovation in Mental Health Award 2015 for the Haringey Adolescent Outreach Team's Time 2 Talk project. The initiative which has been running since September 2013 aims to raise awareness about emotional wellbeing in schools and challenges mental health stigma. Staff used drama, film making, teaching and peer support to tackle the issue of mental ill-health. Anonymous case studies of young people who had experienced serious emotional distress were used for student drama workshops. The resulting theatre performance was then translated into a film called The Boy Behind the Mask.

In that same year it was named by the Health Service Journal as one of the top hundred NHS trusts to work for. At that time it had 2,534 full-time equivalent staff and a sickness absence rate of 4.5%. 51% of staff recommend it as a place for treatment and 49% recommended it as a place to work.

== See also ==
- List of NHS trusts
