= Camden and Islington NHS Foundation Trust =

Healthcare trust in England

- Type: Mental health trust
- Disbanded: 1 November 2024
- Hospitals: St Pancras Hospital
- Chair: Leisha Fullick
- Chief executive: Angela Mcnab
- Website: www.candi.nhs.uk

Camden and Islington NHS Foundation Trust provided mental health, substance misuse services and care for people with learning disabilities in part of London, England. It operated over twenty sites in Camden and Islington, but by far the largest site, and the location of its administrative headquarters, was the St Pancras Hospital.

It was the first Care Trust to be awarded NHS Foundation Trust status, in 2008. The first Chair of the Trust to be appointed after it became a Foundation Trust was Richard Arthur. In the event, it was his last public appointment (previous appointments had included Leader of Camden Council) as he chose to retire in September 2013, after four and a half years in post. He was succeeded as Chair of the Trust by the former chief executive of Islington Council Leisha Fullick. The appointment was made, after public advertisement and interview, on the proposal of the Nominations Committee of the Trust, and ratified by a vote, after discussion, of the Council of Governors. The Remuneration and Nominations committee, to give it its full title, also oversees the appointment process for the Non-Executive Directors of the Trust and also makes recommendations regarding pay and conditions. It consists of the Chair of the Trust, the Senior Independent Director of the Trust, and a majority of Governors elected by the Council of Governors. The chair of the committee is chosen by the committee, and the current (2015) chair is Wendy Savage.

It was named by the Health Service Journal as one of the top hundred NHS trusts to work for in 2015. At that time it had 1774 full-time equivalent staff and a sickness absence rate of 2.54%. 55% of staff recommend it as a place for treatment and 56% recommended it as a place to work.

The trust started using the Carenotes electronic patient record system which can be accessed from mobile devices in September 2015.

In 2022 the trust announced its first integrated community mental health facility on its Lowther Road site. This is to be a new four-storey building with interview, counselling, and treatment rooms, and agile workspaces for staff, as well as a café and group collaboration zones. Kier Group are handling the £17 million contract.

On 1 November 2024, the Trust merged with Barnet, Enfield and Haringey Mental Health NHS Trust to form North London NHS Foundation Trust.

== See also ==
- List of NHS trusts
