= Ossulston Estate =

Housing estate in Somers Town, London

Coordinates: 51.5297°N 0.1293°W

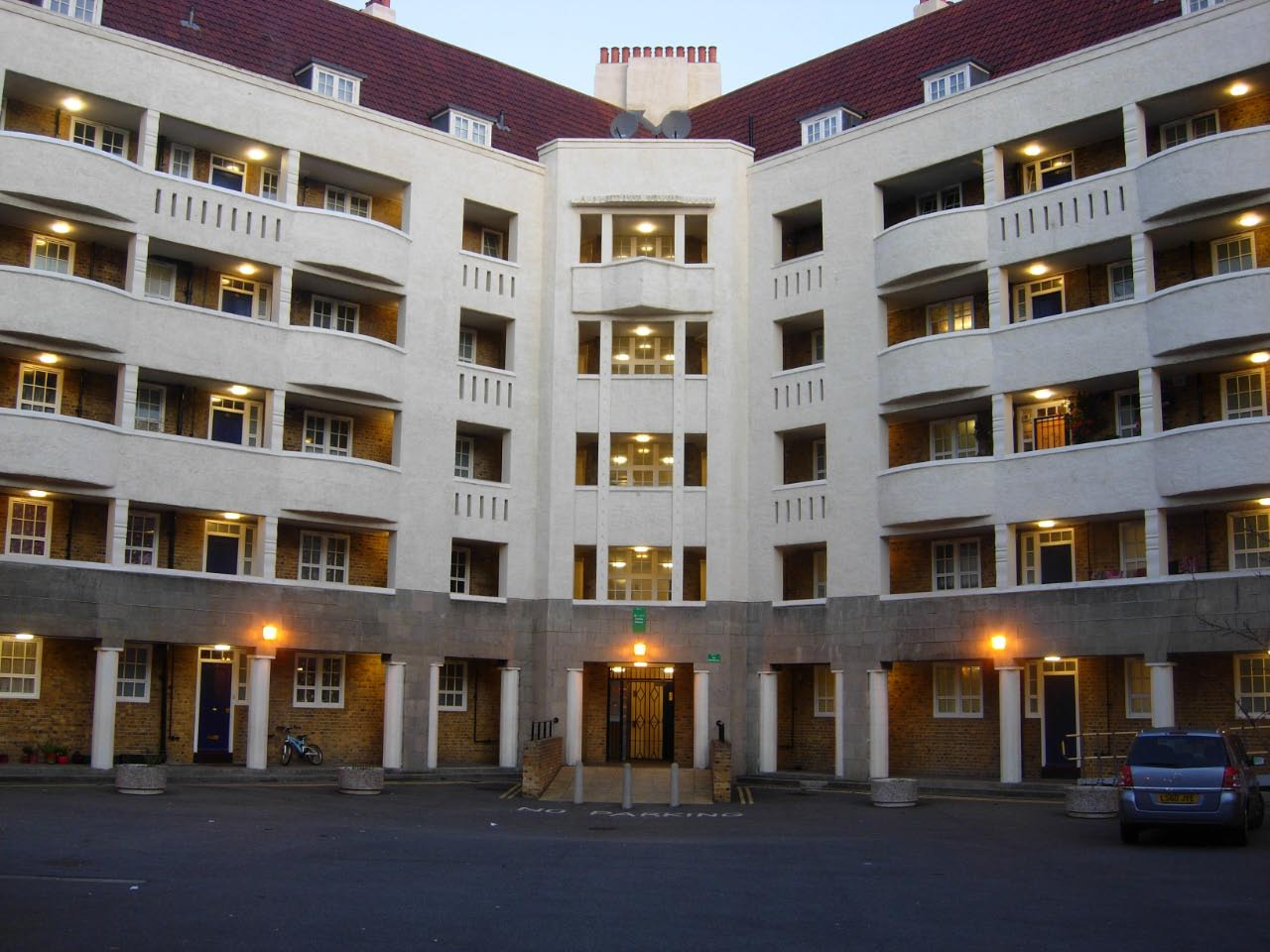
- Levita House
- Interactive map of Ossulston Estate

General information
- Location: Chalton Street
- Area: Somers Town, London

Construction
- Constructed: 1927-31
- Architect: G. Topham Forrest
- Authority: London County Council
- Style: Modernist
- Influence: Gemeindebau

Refurbishment
- Refurbished: 2004-7
- Architect: Sprunt Architects

Listing
- Listed as: Grade II

Other information
- Governing body: Camden Council

The Ossulston Estate is a multi-storey council estate built by the London County Council (LCC) on Chalton Street in Somers Town between 1927 and 1931. It was unusual at the time both in its inner-city location and in its modernist design, and all the original parts of the estate are now Grade II listed buildings.

The estate was built to rehouse those poor who were not being served by the LCC's new suburban estates, and was significantly denser to suit the urban site. It was located on the site of the Somers Town slum, between Euston and St Pancras stations. The original proposal made in 1925 was for 9-storey blocks on the American model, which would have required lifts, and with more expensive flats for private tenants on the highest floors. This was rejected and the height reduced to a maximum of 7 storeys, with fewer lifts and no private flats. The provision of central heating was also eliminated, but the buildings were unusual in providing electricity from the start, and Levita House had the first central heating system installed by the LCC.

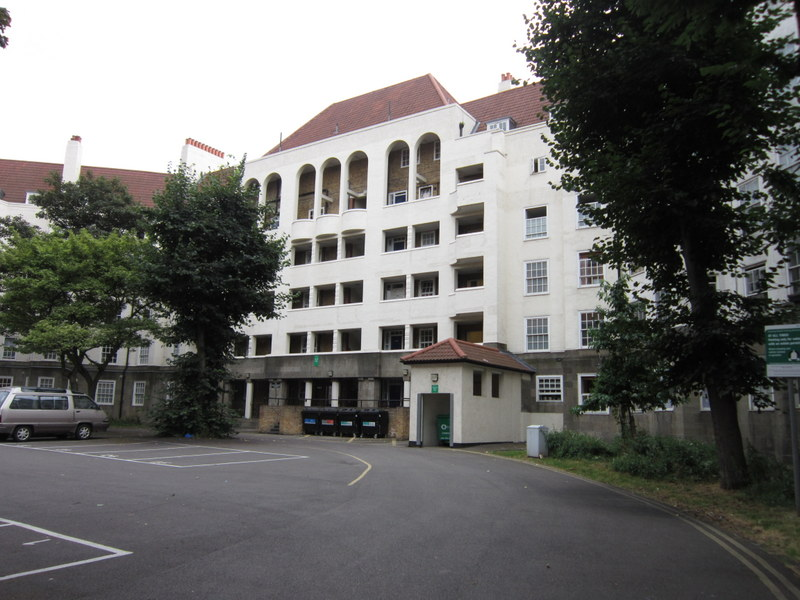
Levita House, front

The design, by G. Topham Forrest, chief architect of the LCC, and his assistants R. Minton Taylor and E.H. Parkes, was influenced by Viennese modernist public housing such as Karl Marx-Hof, which Forrest had visited. The estate consists of blocks grouped around three courtyards and small greens, reached through archways from Ossulston and Chalton Streets; some of the original plantings survive. The buildings have some neo-Georgian features in the treatment of roofs and windows, but are modernist in being of steel-frame construction with unornamented roughcast walls, the facades instead enlivened by spatial features such as the archways in front of the balconies which lead to the individual flats. Chamberlain House, three blocks of flats, was built in 1927–29; Levita House, south of it and named for Cecil Levita, who was chairman of the LCC's Housing Committee in the 1920s, was built in 1930–31 and consists of the 7-storey section and wings enclosing a grand courtyard which was originally intended to lead to the premium flats. Walker House was begun in 1929–30, but the other side of the courtyard was completed in 1936–37 with more traditional brick 6-storey buildings. The total number of flats was 310. Chamberlain House, Levita House, the southern part of Walker House and the associated shops and The Cock Tavern public house are all Grade II listed buildings.

In 2004–07, Levita House was extensively refurbished by Sprunt Architects, which included creating larger flats, external refurbishment of the fabric and changes to the courtyard areas.
