= William Finden =

English engraver (1787–1852)

William Finden (1787 – 20 September 1852) was an English engraver.

== Life ==
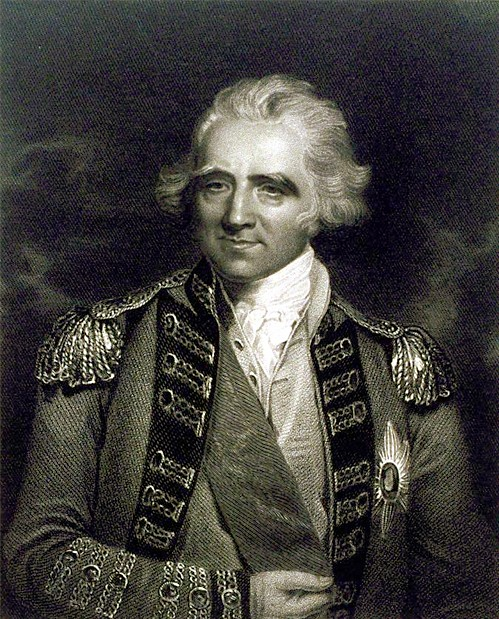
Sir Ralph Abercromby K.B., engraving by William Finden after John Hoppner

He served his apprenticeship to James Mitan, but appears to have owed far more to the influence of James Heath, whose works he privately and earnestly studied. His first employment on his own account was engraving illustrations for books, and among the most noteworthy of these early plates were Smirke's illustrations to Don Quixote. His neat style and smooth finish made his pictures very attractive and popular, and although he executed several large plates, his chief work throughout his life was book illustration.

His younger brother, Edward Finden, worked in conjunction with him, and so much demand arose for their productions that ultimately a company of assistants was engaged, and plates were produced in increasing numbers, their quality as works of art declining as their quantity rose. The largest plate executed by William Finden was the portrait of King George IV seated on a sofa, after the painting by Sir Thomas Lawrence. For this work he received two thousand guineas, a sum larger than had ever before been paid for an engraved portrait. Finden's next and happiest works on a large scale were the Highlanders Return and the Village Festival, after Wilkie.

Later in life he undertook, in co-operation with his brother, aided by their numerous staff, the publication as well as the production of various galleries of engravings. The first of these, a series of landscape and portrait illustrations to the life and works of Byron, appeared in 1833 and following years, and was very successful. But by his Gallery of British Art (in fifteen parts, 1838–40), the most costly and best of these ventures, he lost the fruits of all his former success. Finden's last undertaking was an engraving on a large scale of William Hilton's Crucifixion. The plate was bought by the Art Union of London for £1,470. He died in London and was buried on the western side of Highgate Cemetery.
