= Alfred Robert Freebairn =

English engraver (1794–1846)

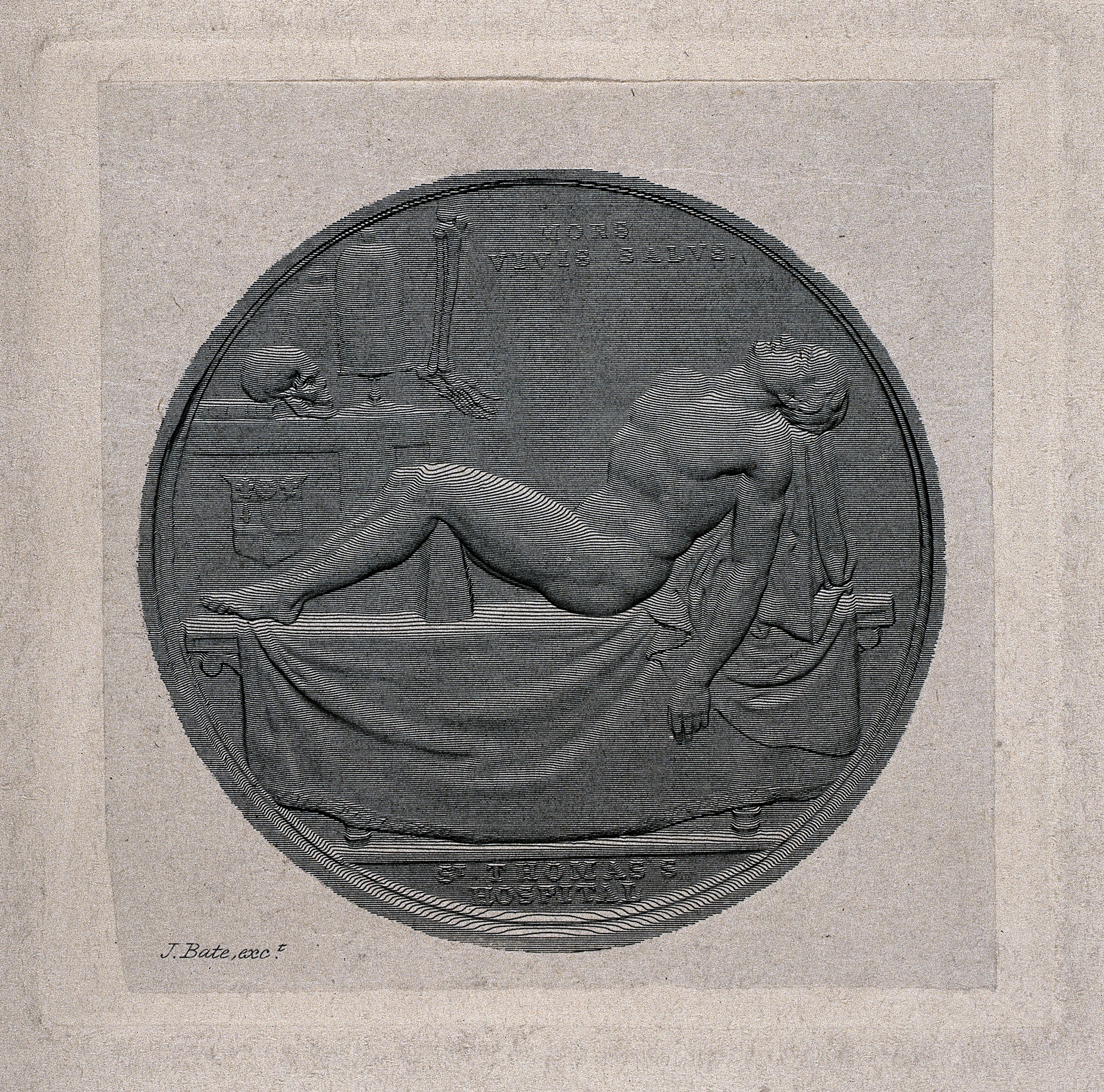
Engraving by A. R. Freebairn, showing anaglyptograph technique

Alfred Robert Freebairn (1794–1846), was an English engraver.

== Life ==
Freebairn was apparently the son of Robert Freebairn, the landscape painter, and is probably identical with the younger Freebairn who etched the Sketch-book of Robert Freebairn, published in 1815. He was a student at the Royal Academy, and engraved some vignettes and illustrations after Roberts, Prout, Pyne, and others for the Book of Gems and other popular works. His later work seems to have been entirely confined to the production of engravings by the mechanical process, invented by John Bate, known as the "Anaglyptograph". This machine was specially adapted for reproducing objects with raised surfaces, such as coins, medals, reliefs, &c. Freebairn's engraving The beautiful gate of the temple (published by Hodgson & Co.) was described, when it was released, in the following way:

This is the first of a set of the cartoons which is about to be published, and it is, of its class of art, by far the most beautiful work that has yet been produced : the tone of the print is more silvery, and brilliant, and delicate, than any similar production that we have yet seen; for, besides that its proportions are accurately traced by the perfect and beautiful machine of Mr. Bates, the tone in which it is etched, and the artist-like beauty of the work thus produced by Mr. Freebairn, place it far above any specimen yet produced by our Continental neighbours.

— The Literary Gazette and Journal of the Belles Lettres, Arts, Sciences, &c, 1837

Freebairn produced a large number of engravings by this process, some of which were published in the Art Union (1846). His most important works in this style of engraving were A salver of the 16th century’ after Jean Goujon, and a series of engravings of Flaxman's Shield of Achilles; the latter, a very remarkable work, was executed and published at Freebairn's own risk and expense, and only completed shortly before his death.

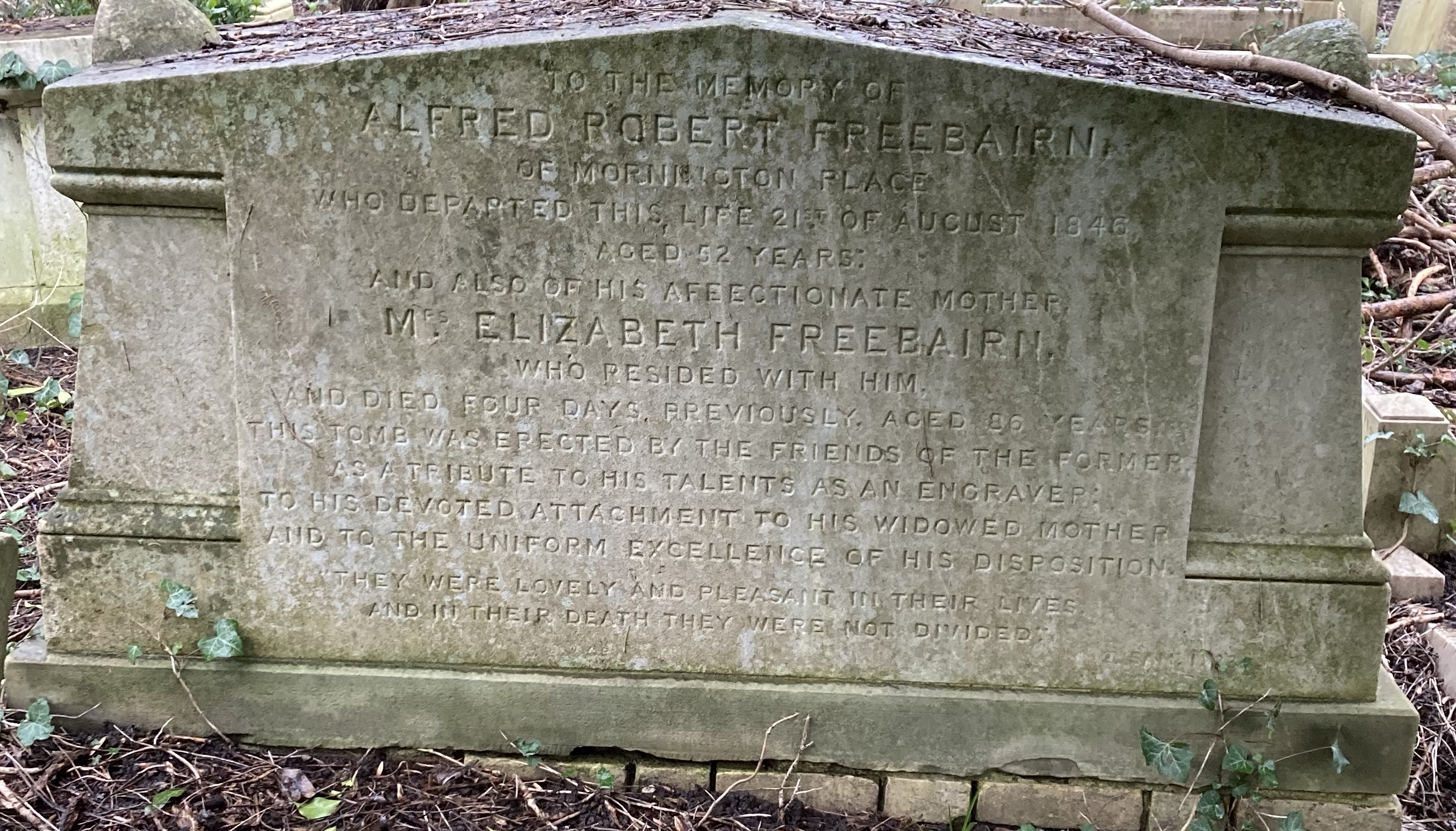
Freebairn's tombstone in Highgate Cemetery

== Death ==
He died suddenly on 21 August 1846, at the age of fifty-two, four days after the death of his mother to whom he was devoted. He is buried with her in Highgate Cemetery. His headstone was carved by the sculptor Charles Harriott Smith.
