= Edward Francis Finden =

British engraver (1791–1857)

Edward Francis Finden (1791–1857) was a British engraver.

== Life ==
Finden was the younger brother, fellow-pupil, and coadjutor of William Finden, and shared his successes and fortunes.

== Works ==
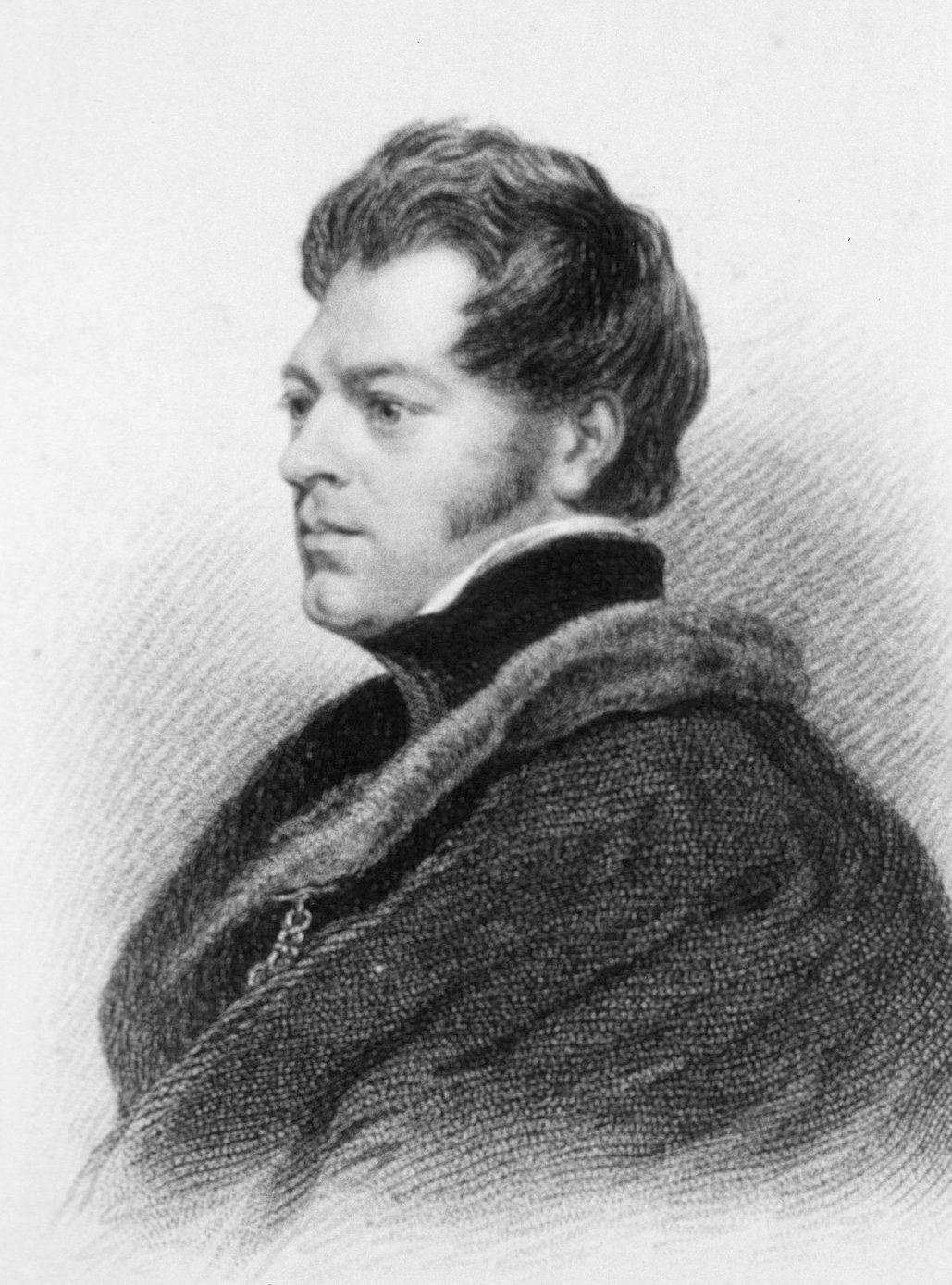
John Richardson, 1828 by Thomas Phillips, R.A., engraved by Finden

Finden executed some separate works, among early ones being a set of etchings for Richard Duppa's Miscellaneous Opinions and Observations on the Continent (1825) and Illustrations of the Vaudois in a Series of Views (1831). He was also a large contributor of illustrations to the annuals, books of beauty, poetry, and other sentimental works then in vogue.

The separate engravings he executed included: The Harvest Waggon, after Thomas Gainsborough; As Happy as a King' after William Collins; Captain Macheath in Prison, after Gilbert Stuart Newton; The Little Gleaner after Sir William Beechey; The Princess Victoria, after Richard Westall and Othello telling his Exploits to Brabantio and Desdemona, after Douglas Cowper. He also did engravings for landscape painter James Duffield Harding (1798–1863) including "Mount Edgcumbe".

He died at St. John's Wood, aged 65, on 9 February 1857 and was buried on the western side of Highgate Cemetery.
