= Robert Freebairn =

British artist

Robert Freebairn (1765 – 23 January 1808 in London) was a British landscape painter.

== Life ==
Freebairn was born in 1765, apparently of Scottish descent, and is usually stated to have been the last pupil of Richard Wilson, R.A. This does not seem certain, as Freebairn was articled to Philip Reinagle, R.A., and it was from Reinagle's house that he sent his first picture to the Royal Academy in 1782, the year of Wilson's death. He continued to exhibit landscapes up to 1786, when he appears to have gone to Italy. In 1789 and 1790 he was at Rome, and sent views of Roman scenery to the academy. In 1791 he sent two views of the "Viamala" in the Grisons, probably taken on his return journey. His stay in Italy formed his style, and he brought back to England a storehouse of material, on which he drew plentifully during the remainder of his life, his productions being mainly representations of Italian scenery.

When in Italy he was patronised by Lord Clive, and on his return to England by Lord Suffolk, John Penn of Stoke, and others. His compositions were noted for their elegance rather than for grandeur, and were pleasing enough to enable him to secure sufficient patronage and commissions for his pictures, most of which he exhibited at the Royal Academy. He occasionally painted views of Welsh and Lancashire scenery, but his chief excellence lay in his Roman subjects. Some of his drawings were published in aquatint.

Freebairn died in Buckingham Place, New Road, Marylebone, aged 42, leaving a widow and four children. After his death there was published in 1815 a volume called Outlines of Lancashire Scenery, from an unpublished Sketch-book of the late R. Freebairn, designed as studies for the use of schools and beginners, and etched by the younger Freebairn [i.e. Albert Robert Freebairn ].

== Sources ==
This article incorporates text from a publication now in the public domain: "Freebairn, Robert". Dictionary of National Biography. London: Smith, Elder & Co. 1885–1900.
