= St Pancras Hospital =

- North London NHS Foundation Trust
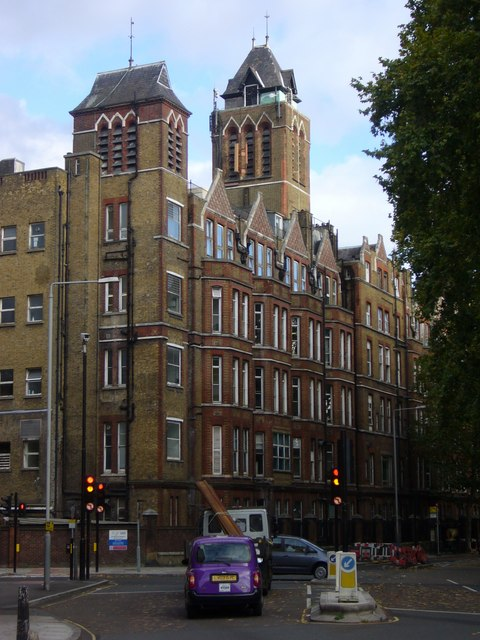
- St Pancras Hospital

- Location in Camden

Geography
- Location: London, NW1; United Kingdom
- Coordinates: 51°32′10″N 0°7′56″W

Organisation
- Care system: NHS England
- Type: Specialist

Services
- Emergency department: No
- Speciality: Geriatrics, psychiatry

History
- Founded: 1848

St Pancras Hospital is part of North London NHS Foundation Trust in St Pancras area of Central London, near Camden Town. The hospital specialises in geriatric and psychiatric medicine.

The hospital also hosts other NHS services, including rehabilitation wards and a dialysis unit provided by Central North West London NHS Foundation Trust.

== History ==
The hospital was established as the infirmary for the St Pancras Union Workhouse in 1848. It is partly housed in the original 18th-century workhouse buildings.

After St Pancras North Infirmary opened in Highgate in 1869, the hospital in St Pancras Way became known as the St Pancras South Infirmary. After the North Infirmary was renamed Highgate Hospital, the South Infirmary was renamed St Pancras Hospital in 1920. In 1930, the hospital was transferred to the jurisdiction of London County Council under the Local Government Act. 1929.

At this time the hospital had 384 beds under the supervision of Medical Superintendent R. K. Ford MD (Lond), Matron Miss F. Davey and Steward W. R. Chaplin. Ethel Frances Davey was appointed matron in 1923, having previously worked at the Ministry of Pensions Hospital in Orpington. Matron Davey, a fellow of the British College of Nursing, remained in post until her sudden death in 1944.

On the same site as the St. Pancras Hospital was the St. Pancras Institution with 1,320 beds in 1930 for which W. Feldman was also medical officer and Miss V. N. Spencer-Jones RRC was matron, a post she held from 1922 to 1940.

The hospital joined the National Health Service in 1948 under the management of the University College Hospital.

The former maternity wards were occupied by the Hospital for Tropical Diseases from 1951 until 1998. After the hospital chapel became a day nursery, chaplaincy services were provided by St Pancras Old Church. During the 1990s the hospital came under the management of the Camden and Islington NHS Foundation Trust.

In January 1999 an independent report revealed abuse at Beach House, one of the geriatric units of the hospital, where nurses hit and tied up elderly mentally ill patients, and racially intimidated colleagues who threatened to report them.

A paedophile nurse was sacked in February 2005 and subsequently struck off.

The number of mental health beds was reduced between 2007 and 2008.

== Future ==
In 2026, plans were underway to redevelop the site, and sell the majority of the land and buildings to help fund new healthcare facilities across North London. A two acre portion of the estate was sold in 2023 to construct a new state of the art eye hospital for Moorfields NHS Foundation Trust.

The remainder of the site, except for the existing South Wing, has been sold to the Kings Cross Group to be redeveloped into housing and commercial units. The South Wing will continue to be used by the Trust following refurbishment.

== Exhibitions ==
Located in two areas adjacent to Conference Centre rooms at St Pancras Hospital, the Arts Project, aided by financial support from various changing NHS Charitable Funds, organised art exhibitions since 2003, uniting the arts and health care.

== Notable patients ==
Notable patients have included:

- Sir Kingsley Amis, comic novelist, died in the hospital on 22 October 1995.
- Henry Croft, the first Pearly King was born (24 May 1861) and died (1 January 1930) in the hospital.
- Charles Sydney Gibbes, English tutor to the children of Emperor Nicholas II of Russia, died in the hospital on 24 March 1963.
- Robert Heron, writer, died in the hospital on 13 April 1807.
- Glyndwr Michael, the man whose body was used in Operation Mincemeat, died in the hospital on 28 January 1943.

== See also ==
- Healthcare in London
