= Marc Balakjian =

British painter

Marc Balakjian (born in Rayak Lebanon, 1938, died 2017, Muswell Hill, London) was a British printmaker and artist. He is best known for his work at Studio Prints in Queen's Crescent, London, where editions of artists’ prints were created. He joined the business in 1974 and went on to work with some of the most important contemporary British artists, including Frank Auerbach, Lucian Freud, Ken Kiff, R. B. Kitaj, Leon Kossoff, William Turnbull and Kim Lim. He married the founder and collaborator of Studio Prints, Dorothea Wight, in 1973. They led the workshop in introducing a number of techniques to British printmaking, and the studio was considered "at the forefront of British Printmaking for 40 years".

Balakjian was also an artist in his own right, known for his mezzotints and pencil drawings which have been exhibited around the world in countless solo and group exhibitions. His works are in a number of permanent collections in the UK including those of the V&A, the British Museum, the British Council, the Arts Council of Great Britain, the Museum of London, the Fitzwilliam Museum, The New Art Gallery Walsall. They are also in prominent collections in the US, Germany, France, Netherlands, Poland, Belgium, Italy, Norway, Ireland and Canada.

== Personal life ==
Balakjian was born and grew up in Rayak, Lebanon. His parents were of Armenian descent, having fled to Lebanon from Turkey during the Armenian genocide His father was a cobbler.

After studying painting at Hammersmith College of Art from 1968 to 1971, Balajian earned a postgraduate degree in printmaking at the Slade School of Fine Art from 1971 to 1973.

He died of pancreatic cancer on 10 August 2017.
