= Queen's Crescent Market =

Street market in Camden, London, England

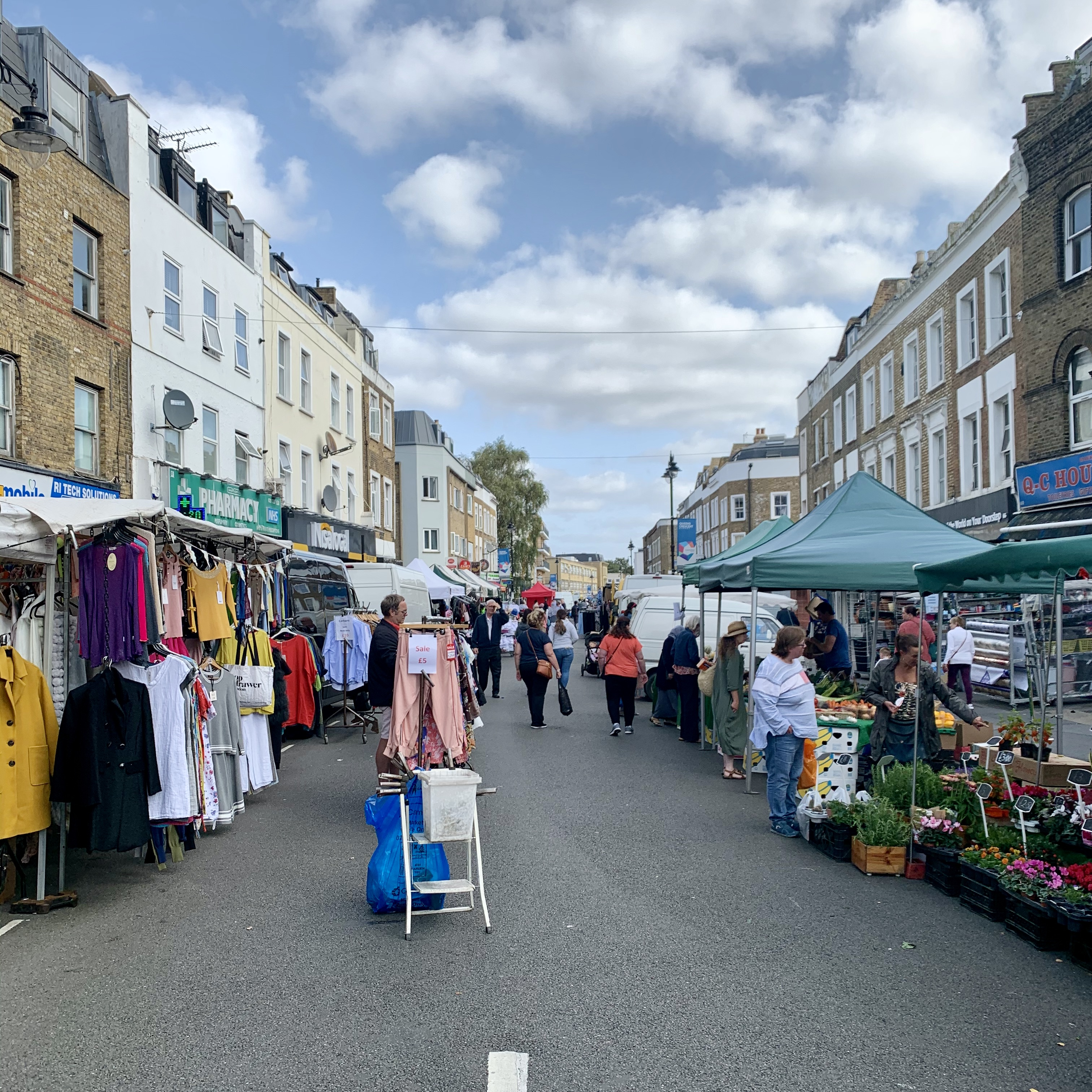
- View from Malden Road along Queen’s Crescent Market, 2020
- Location: Queen's Crescent; Kentish Town, Camden, Greater London; 51.5488°N 0.1534°W
- Opening date: 1876 (150 years ago)
- Management: Camden London Borough Council
- Owner: Camden London Borough Council
- Environment: Outdoor
- Goods sold: General goods
- Days normally open: Thursday, Saturday
- Website: camden.gov.uk/markets
- Location within London Borough of Camden

Queen's Crescent Market is an outdoor street market held every Thursday and Saturday on Queen's Crescent in Kentish Town, Camden between the junction with Malden Road in the West and the junction with Grafton Road in the East. Licences to trade are issued by Camden London Borough Council.

The market sells food, discounted clothing and a wide variety of household products. In 2011, the Camden Council database reported 77 sites.

Many traders run stalls that have been passed from generation to generation. This is in contrast to the much more recent and considerably more famous Camden markets nearby, which primarily attract tourists and those from other parts of London).

Aesthetically Queen's Crescent market is a mixture, with plain white houses sitting side by side with large council estates, some of which sit in landscaped grounds.

== History ==
=== Early history (1872–1927) ===
As with a number of other streets in the area, Queen's Crescent is named for Queen Victoria who liked to ride in her carriage to West End Lane, Hampstead.

==== Sainsbury's ====
In 1872 John Sainsbury and Mary Ann Sainsbury opened their second shop at 159 Queen's Crescent. The following year the Sainsbury family moved to live above the shop.

The shop did well and John James opened another branch in 1875 at 151 Queen's Crescent. This new shop specialised in bacon and ham. Trade continued to grow and in 1884, a third branch was added at number 98.

Market traders moved from Malden Road to Queen's Crescent in 1876 when electrification works were undertaken on Malden Road to replace the horse-drawn trams. In 1893 there were 44 food stalls and 19 non-food stalls with thirteen of the stalls kept by shopkeepers and the rest belonging to independent traders.

From 1867 until 1927, street trading was regulated by the police with no licensing or regulation other than the size and spacing of pitches. Queen's Crescent is the only one of Camden's existing street markets to have started during the era of police regulation.

=== Management by local councils (1927–present) ===
==== Metropolitan Borough of St Pancras (1927–1965) ====
The London County Council (General Powers) Act 1927 replaced police regulation with a new licensing regime administered by metropolitan borough councils. From 1927 to 1965 the market was managed by the Metropolitan Borough of St Pancras.

In 1936, whilst calling the market Queen Street, Bendetta describes a weekday market selling hosiery, draper, clothing, and food.

===== Patak's =====
In 1956, Shanta Pathak and her husband Lakshmishankar Pathak moved to Queen's Crescent from Kenya. Whilst Lakshmishankar worked cleaning drains for Metropolitan Borough of St Pancras Shanta started a business from her kitchen making and selling Indian sweets and snacks, this business would grow into Patak's. She soon had queues outside the door and was making deliveries across London.

Following complaints from neighbours about the noise and the smell of the cooking, in 1962 the Council gave them three months to find alternative premises. They found a converted mill in Brackley, Northamptonshire, and left London.

==== London Borough of Camden (1965–2013) ====
In 1965 the Borough of St Pancras was abolished and its area became part of the London Borough of Camden.

By the early 1970s, Sainsbury's had closed and been replaced by Studio Prints a workshop run by artist and printer Dorothea Wight which was responsible for printing the etchings of many prominent British artists of the last 40 years, including Lucian Freud, Frank Auerbach, Ken Kiff, Julian Trevelyan, R. B. Kitaj, Celia Paul, and Stephen Conroy.

In 1978, the goods for sale on Queen's Crescent are described as:

Cheap clothes (old and new, including Afghan coats), toys, books and domestic goods.

— Alternative London (1978)

In 1983, Forshaw reports 80 stalls on Thursdays and Saturdays selling food as well as clothes, leather goods, toys, cosmetics, and haberdashery from West to East as you move along the Market. In the same year, Perlmutter reports a slightly lower number of stalls at 60 to 70 and recommends the market for buying cheap plants.

The market was successful enough for the council to invest in five garages for market barrows as part of a light industrial development at 47 Allcroft Road. In the early twentieth century the land was later sold for redevelopment and became private housing.

In 2011, Studio Prints closed.

==== Queen's Crescent Community Association (2013–2015) ====
The market had been run by Camden Council until 2013, when it was transferred to Queen's Crescent Community Association (QCCA), a not-for-profit charity. In 2015 there were disagreements over the cost of rubbish removal, cleaning and repairs, leaving the QCCA with what it called impossible bills; after negotiations collapsed, the QCCA handed back the market's management to the council.

==== London Borough of Camden (2015–present) ====
In May 2016 the market continued, but was much reduced, with traders reduced from 50 a few years earlier to 22.

The Greater London Authority has a Good Growth Fund which provides grants that have to be spent on infrastructure schemes by 2021. Camden Council were awarded £1.1 million in 2018 to reinvigorate Queen's Crescent, including the market, with high street improvement works. The award requires that local people must be involved in the regeneration plans. Members of Reclaim Queen's Crescent, a group campaigning to improve the market and other neighbourhood services said "there is some wariness about how much we will be listened to after our experience with the market".

== In popular culture ==
The Market briefly features in the 1971 short-form documentary about Dorothea Wight and Studio Prints, At a Printmakers Workshop.

Queen's Crescent Market and the Sir Robert Peel pub were used as a filming location in the third episode of the first series of Minder (1979).

== Transport ==
=== Bus ===
Bus Routes 24, 46, and 393 serve Malden Road.

=== Railway and tube ===
The nearest rail stations are Gospel Oak and Kentish Town West.
