= Tachbrook Street Market =

Market in Pimlico, London

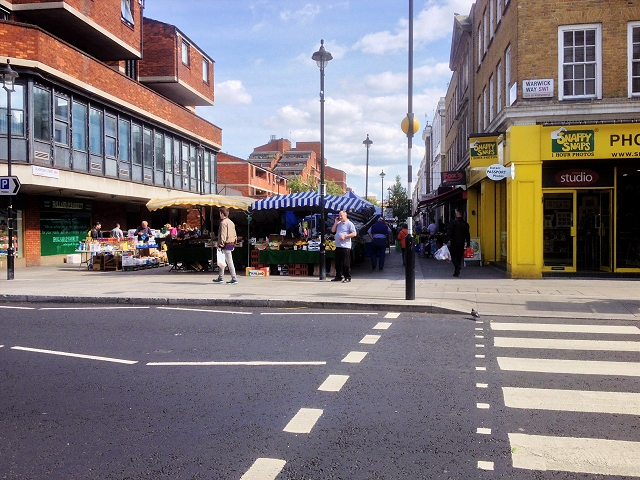
- Tachbrook Street Market in 2015
- Location: Tachbrook Street, Pimlico, London; Tachbrook Street, Pimlico, London; 51.492202°N 0.138618°W
- Opening date: 1867 (159 years ago)
- Management: City of Westminster
- Owner: City of Westminster
- Environment: Outdoor
- Goods sold: fruit and vegetables, traditional butcher and fishmonger, clothing, household goods, and international street food
- Days normally open: Monday to Saturday
- Number of tenants: 20
- Website: westminster.gov.uk/licensing/markets-and-street-trading
- Location within City of Westminster

Tachbrook Street Market (formerly Warwick Street Market) is an outdoor street market on the north end of Tachbrook Street between the junctions with Warwick Way and Churton Street in the Pimlico area of the City of Westminster. Licences to trade are issued by Westminster City Council.

== History ==
Originally held on adjacent Warwick Way where the market was established in 1867. In the late nineteenth century it consisted of 63 stalls of which two thirds were fruit and vegetables and fresh flowers. On Saturdays the market made the footway impassable.

In the 1930s the market was still predominately fruit and vegetables with traders buying their goods wholesale at Covent Garden Market then retailing them to local households. At this time the market had about 200 stalls.

After the second world war the market had substantially diminished. To facilitate Warwick Way's use as an access road for fire engines, the market was moved to its current location in the pedestrianised northern end of Tachbrook Street which reduced the size of the market to one-tenth of its former size.

In the nineteen eighties the market continued to be mainly selling fresh produce and catering to the local community of both Belgravia and the social housing adjacent to the market.

In the mid-1990s only a dozen stalls remained with the focus remaining on fresh produce and the traders contending with a changing local population, competition from a new local Tesco supermarket, and high licence fees. The market continued to decline over the next decade until in the mid-2010s the local council invested in the market and encouraged new street food traders to the market to appeal to the local office workers.

According to disgraced from politician Jonathan Aitken, his mother Penelope Aitken was a regular customer of the market and a number of the remaining market traders visited her at home in the last weeks of her life.

The fishmongers, now run by Jonathan Norris and formerly by the Wright family, has traded on the market since its inception in 1876.

== Transport ==
=== Bus ===
2, 24, 36, 185, 360, and C10.

=== Railway and tube ===
Pimlico and Victoria.
