= Goodge Place Market =

Outdoor street market in North London

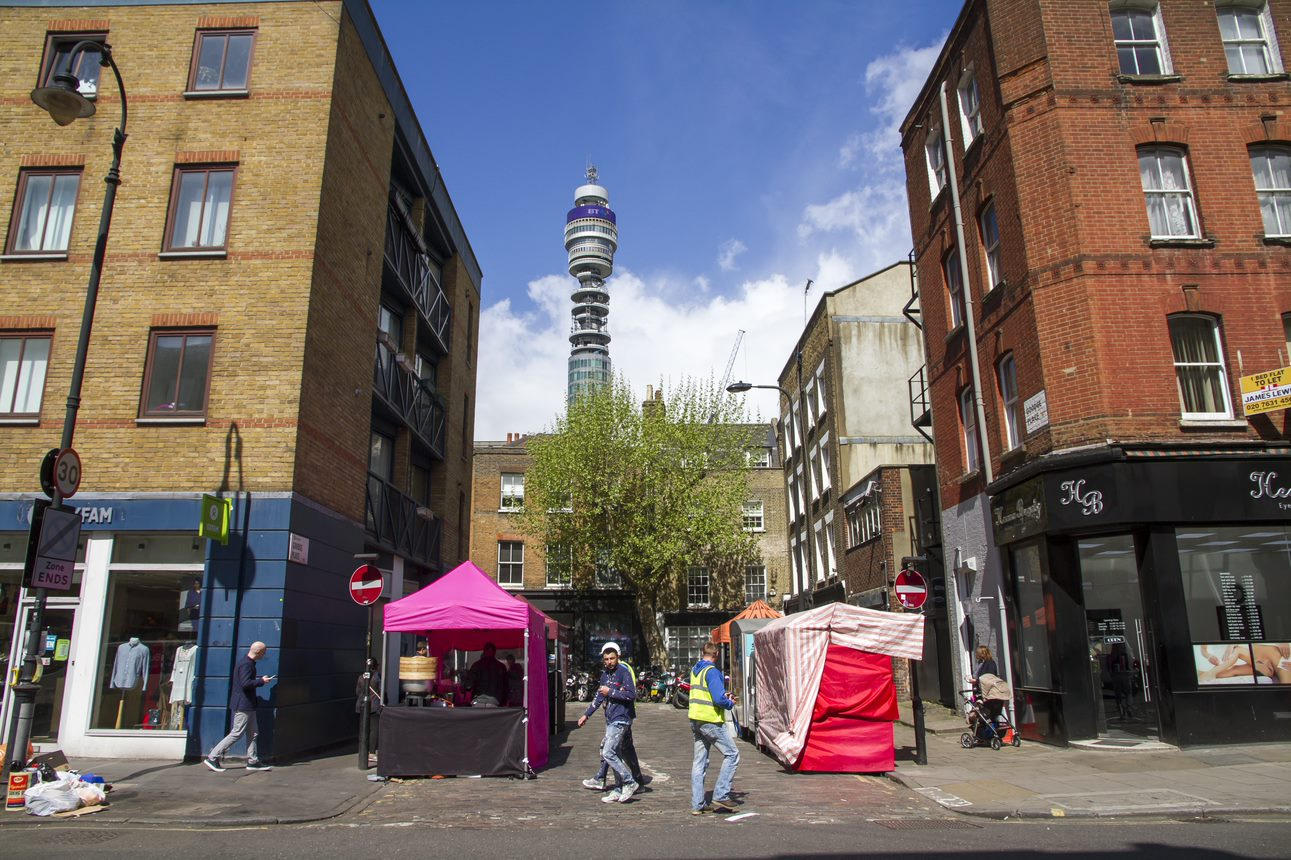
- Location: Goodge Place; Fitzrovia, Camden, Greater London; 51.519275°N 0.136298°W
- Opening date: 1850 (176 years ago)
- Management: Camden London Borough Council
- Owner: Camden London Borough Council
- Environment: Outdoor
- Goods sold: Street food
- Days normally open: Monday to Friday
- Website: camden.gov.uk/markets
- Location within London Borough of Camden

Goodge Place Market is an outdoor street market in Fitzrovia, in the London Borough of Camden. Licences to trade are issued by Camden London Borough Council.

== History ==
=== Early history (1850–1867) ===
Originally the market occupied Charles Street (now the stretch of Goodge Street between Charlotte Street and Newman Street. Goodge Place, like Goodge Street, is named for Francis and William Goodge who in 1766 began developing Goodge Street as a shopping street.

Unregulated street markets allowed London to grow explosively in the late nineteenth and early twentieth century. The traders could move easily to the new population centres and enabled people to buy provisions without having to travel to the central London wholesale markets. In the early morning traders would load their barrows at the wholesale markets, clean and sort the goods, and then sell them in the new suburban streets. In many cases, the sites of these markets became London's modern high streets.

=== Management by the police (1867–1927) ===
In 1867, section six of the Metropolitan Streets Act effectively prohibited street trading. Following public meetings and press criticism, the act was amended within weeks. Section one of the Metropolitan Streets Act Amendment Act 1867 exempted traders but they were now subject to regulation by the police.

In 1878 Walford writes that the market was on the south-side of the street and busiest on Friday and Saturday evenings, when most people were paid. He describes it is one of the last street markets in and around the West End of London and doubted it would survive long. Survival owed much to the area's retention of a working and lower-middle class population. This happened to a greater degree than in most neighbouring districts, meaning the area had more in common with areas to the north, than prosperous West End neighbours like Marylebone and Bloomsbury.

Fifteen years later the market is described as consisting of 45 stalls and having been established in around 1850. The same report describes the market as being a general market selling food, homewares, flowers, and books.

=== Management by local councils (1927–present) ===
The London County Council (General Powers) Act 1927 replaced police regulation with a new licensing regime administered by metropolitan borough councils. From 1927 to 1965 the market was managed by the Metropolitan Borough of St Pancras.

In 1965 the Borough of St Pancras was abolished and its area became part of the London Borough of Camden.

By 1983 the market had relocated to Goodge Place and Perlmutter describes a small Monday to Saturday market out of keeping with the multinational variety of goods available in the area.

In the 2000s the market followed the trends of the area and consisted of five international street-food stalls selling food from around the world and serving the Monday to Friday lunch crowds.

== Transport ==
=== Bus ===
Bus Routes 24, 29, 73, and 390.

=== Railway and tube ===
The nearest stations are Goodge Street, Tottenham Court Road, and Warren Street.
