= Strutton Ground Market =

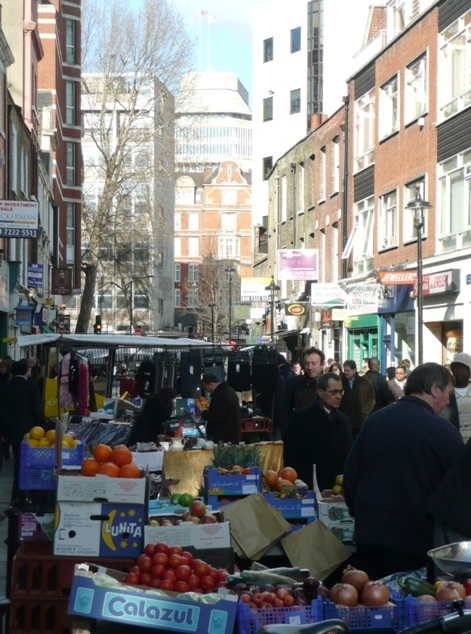
- Strutton Ground Market in 2008
- Location: Strutton Ground, St James's, London; Strutton Ground, St James's, London; 51.497194°N 0.133796°W
- Opening date: 1862 (164 years ago)
- Management: City of Westminster
- Owner: City of Westminster
- Environment: Outdoor
- Goods sold: Street food, household goods, fashion
- Days normally open: Monday to Friday
- Number of tenants: 10
- Website: westminster.gov.uk/licensing/markets-and-street-tradin
- Location within City of Westminster

Strutton Ground Market is a small outdoor street market in the St James's area of the City of Westminster. It takes place on Strutton Ground. Licences to trade are issued by Westminster City Council. The market is located on a narrow cobbled street, Strutton Ground, between Victoria Street and Greycoat Place/Great Peter Street.

The market is open weekdays from 10:00 to 16:00. The market mainly caters to local residents and the office population in the immediate Victoria Street area, selling food, groceries, books, and clothing, but is becoming increasingly popular with tourists.

== History ==
Traders moving from Broadway St James's began the market around 1862 and it gradually grew until it lined both sides of the street by the end of the nineteenth century. At this time it numbered around 50 stalls on a Saturday and 25 during the week. The market was predominantly fresh food and flowers with some clothing, especially secondhand clothes, and served a poor community. Whilst a few of the stalls were erected by shopkeepers, most were run by costermongers.

Between the wars, the market was noted for its floristry and did a brisk trade furnishing flowers for events at the Houses of Parliament.

In the 1980s the market is described as still being focused on fresh food and clothing but now catering to office workers on their lunch breaks.

By the mid nineteen nineties, the market had been reduced down to 20 pitches with only a couple of fruit stalls and one florist remaining. Whilst cheap clothing was still available to buy the other traders were focused on office workers with watches, greeting cards, and umbrellas available.

In the twenty-first century the market followed the trend of the shops and focused on street food served to office lunch crowd. During the COVID-19 pandemic the market was the setting for Chris Whitty, the then Chief Medical Officer, being harassed by a member of the public with the confrontation appearing on social media and then the national news.

== Transport ==
=== Bus ===
Bus Routes 2, 11, 24, 26, 148, N11, N26, N44, and N136.

=== Railway and tube ===
The nearest station is St James's Park.
