= Dorothea Wight =

British printmaker and artist

Dorothea Wight (born in Devon England, 1944, died 2013, Muswell Hill, London) was a British printmaker and artist. Wight is best known for founding the Studio Prints on Queen's Crescent, where editions of artists’ prints were created, working with some of the most important contemporary British artists, including Frank Auerbach, Lucian Freud, Ken Kiff, R. B. Kitaj, Leon Kossoff, Celia Paul, Paula Rego, William Turnbull, Kim Lim and more than 100 other artists. She married her collaborator in the workshop, Marc Balakjian, in 1973. The two would lead Studio Prints in introducing a number of techniques to British printmaking, and the studio was considered "at the forefront of British Printmaking for 40 years".

She was also an artist in her own right, known for her mezzotints which have been exhibited across the world in countless solo and group exhibitions. Her works are in a number of permanent collections in the UK including those of the V&A, the British Museum, the British Council, the Arts Council of Great Britain, the Museum of London, the Fitzwilliam Museum, The New Art Gallery Walsall. Her work is also included in major collections in France, Germany, Poland, Belgium, Norway, Poland and Australia.

== Personal life ==
Wight was born and grew up in Totnes, Devon. Her father, of Scottish descent, was a potter. Wight also learned piano while a child, later in life relearning the skill for public performance.

Wight attend Dartington College of Art from 1963 to 1964 and then studied painting at the Slade School of Fine Art from 1964 to 1968.

Wight died of a rare form of non-Hodgkin’s lymphoma, which she was diagnosed with in 2000, with her health deteriorating over the next 13 years. Her health forced the closure of Studio Prints in 2011.
