= Inverness Street Market =

Market in Camden, London, England

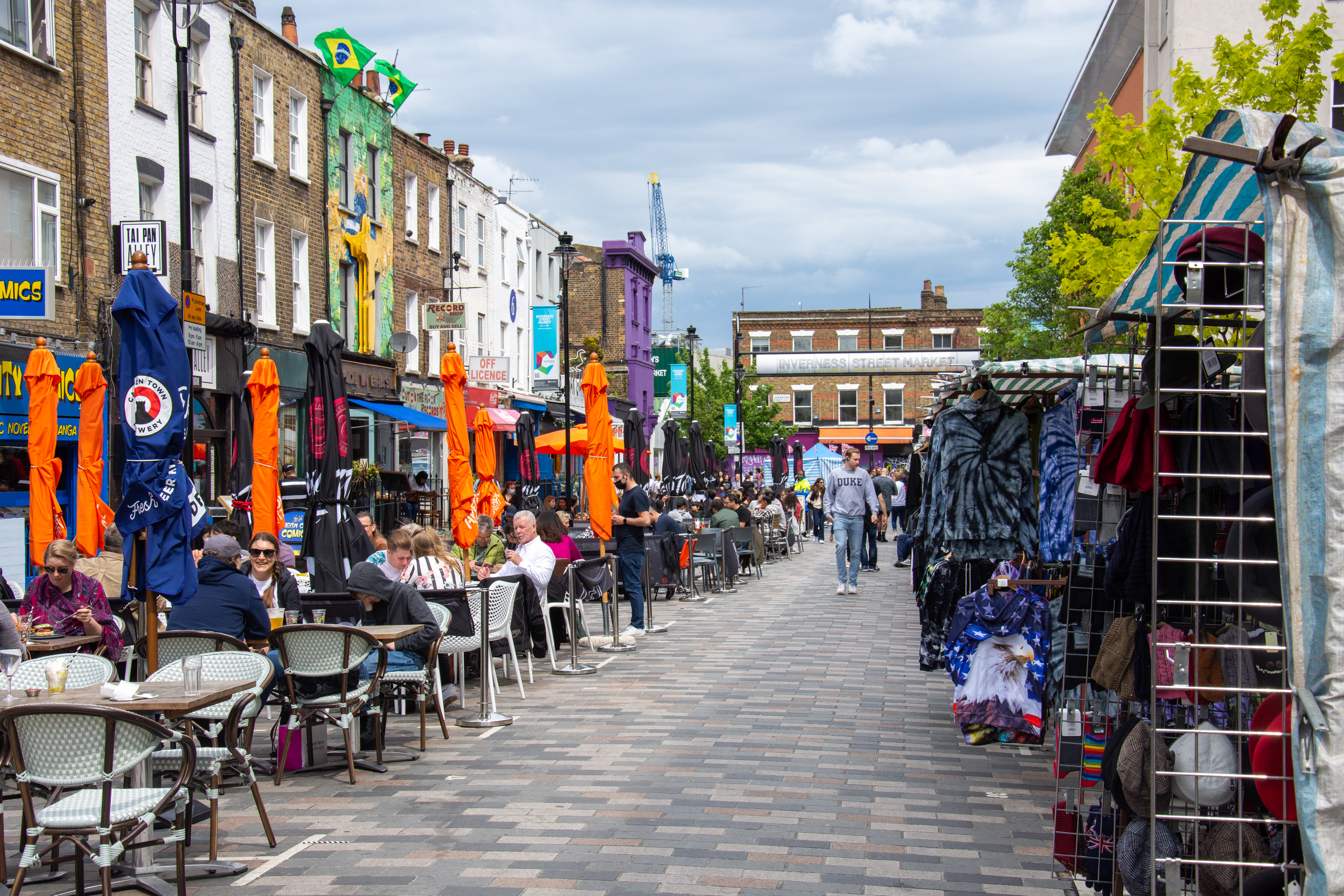
- Inverness Street Market, London, May 2021
- Location: Inverness Street; Camden Town, Camden, Greater London; 51.539734°N 0.143363°W
- Opening date: 1851 (175 years ago)
- Management: Camden London Borough Council
- Owner: Camden London Borough Council
- Environment: Outdoor
- Goods sold: Fashion, Food, Souvenirs
- Days normally open: Every day
- Website: camden.gov.uk/markets
- Location within London Borough of Camden

Inverness Street Market is an outdoor street market in Camden, North London. Licences to trade are issued by Camden London Borough Council.

== History ==
=== Early history (1851–1867) ===
The street was originally called Wellington Street for Arthur Wellesley; it was renamed Inverness Street in 1937 in honour of George VI who, prior to his coronation, held the titles of Duke of York and Earl of Inverness.

As in the case of the former Plender Street Market, Inverness Street Market represents a remnant of Camden Town Market which moved off Camden High Street after the late nineteenth-century electrification of horse-drawn tram.

Camden Town Market is described by Henry Mayhew in 1851 as consisting of 50 stalls. Unregulated street markets allowed London to grow explosively in the late nineteenth and early twentieth century. The traders could move easily to the new population centres and enabled people to buy provisions without having to travel to the central London wholesale markets. In the early morning traders would load their barrows at the wholesale markets, clean and sort the goods, and then sell them in the new suburban streets. In many cases, the sites of these markets became London's modern high streets.

=== Management by the police (1867–1927) ===
In 1867, section six of the Metropolitan Streets Act effectively prohibited street trading. Following public meetings and press criticism, the act was amended within weeks. Section one of the Metropolitan Streets Act Amendment Act 1867 exempted traders but they were now subject to regulation by the police.

The market was still on the High Street in 1878:

Saturday evenings the upper part of the street, thronged as it is with stalls of itinerant vendors of the necessaries of daily life, and with the dwellers in the surrounding districts, presents to an ordinary spectator all the attributes of a market place.

=== Management by local councils (since 1927) ===
==== Metropolitan Borough of St Pancras (1927–1965) ====
The London County Council (General Powers) Act 1927 replaced police regulation with a new licensing regime administered by metropolitan borough councils. From 1927 to 1965 the market was managed by the Metropolitan Borough of St Pancras.

Benedetta's The Street Markets of London makes only a passing reference to Inverness Street Market indicating that it was trading on weekdays only with mostly fruit and vegetables to purchase.

Latterly a successful boxing trainer, George Francis worked on Inverness Street Market in the 1940s.

==== London Borough of Camden (since 1965) ====
In 1965 the Borough of St Pancras was abolished and its area became part of the London Borough of Camden.

In the mid-1980s the market was thriving, with about fifty stalls predominantly selling fruit, vegetables, cheese, meat, fish, and household goods.

By the mid-1990s the market had declined somewhat to thirty stalls. While the range of products had remained similar to that of ten years before, the stalls closest to Camden High Street had changed their lines to souvenirs.

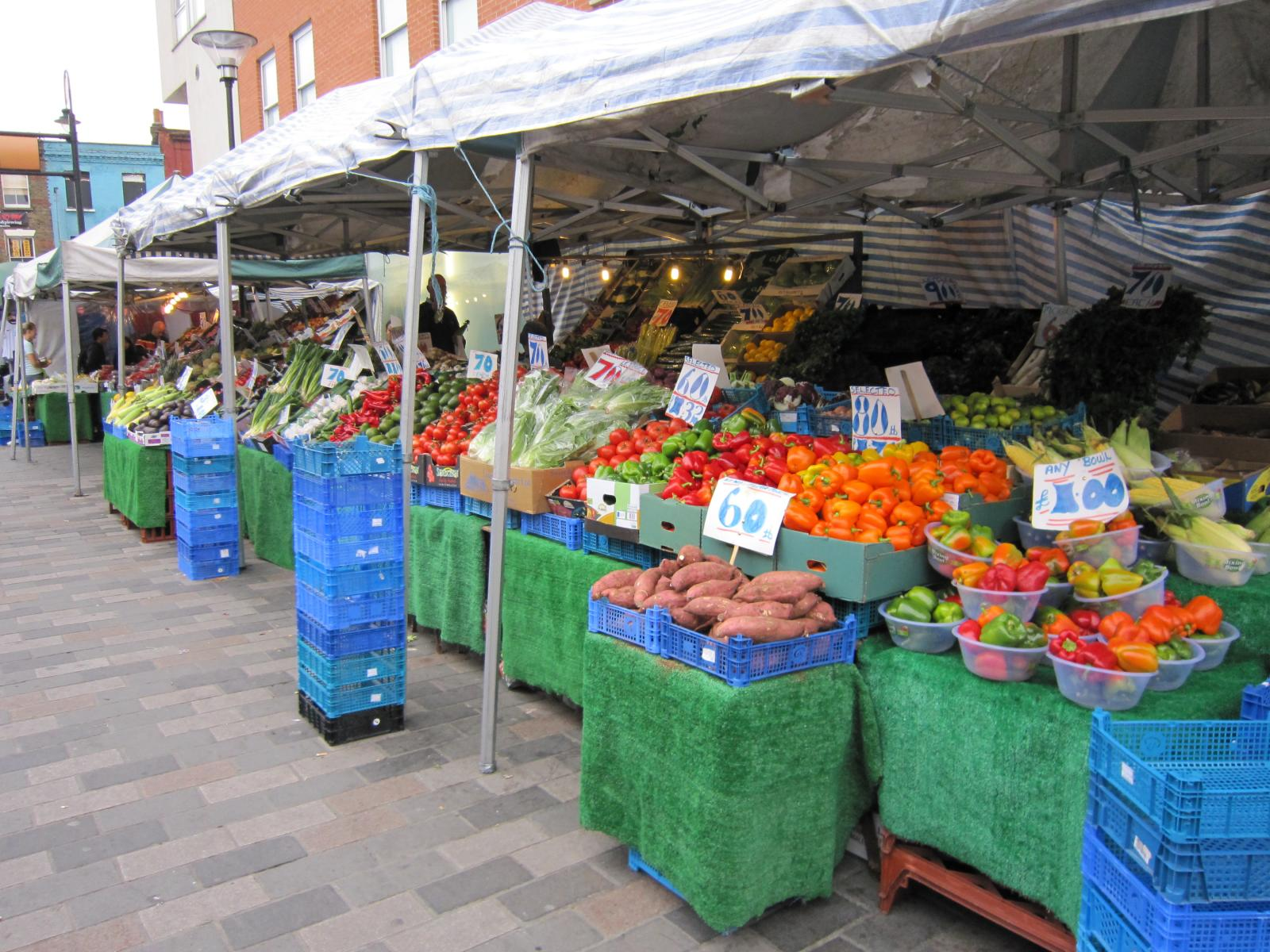
Photograph by Dave Catchpole showing a fruit & veg stall on Inverness Street in 2010

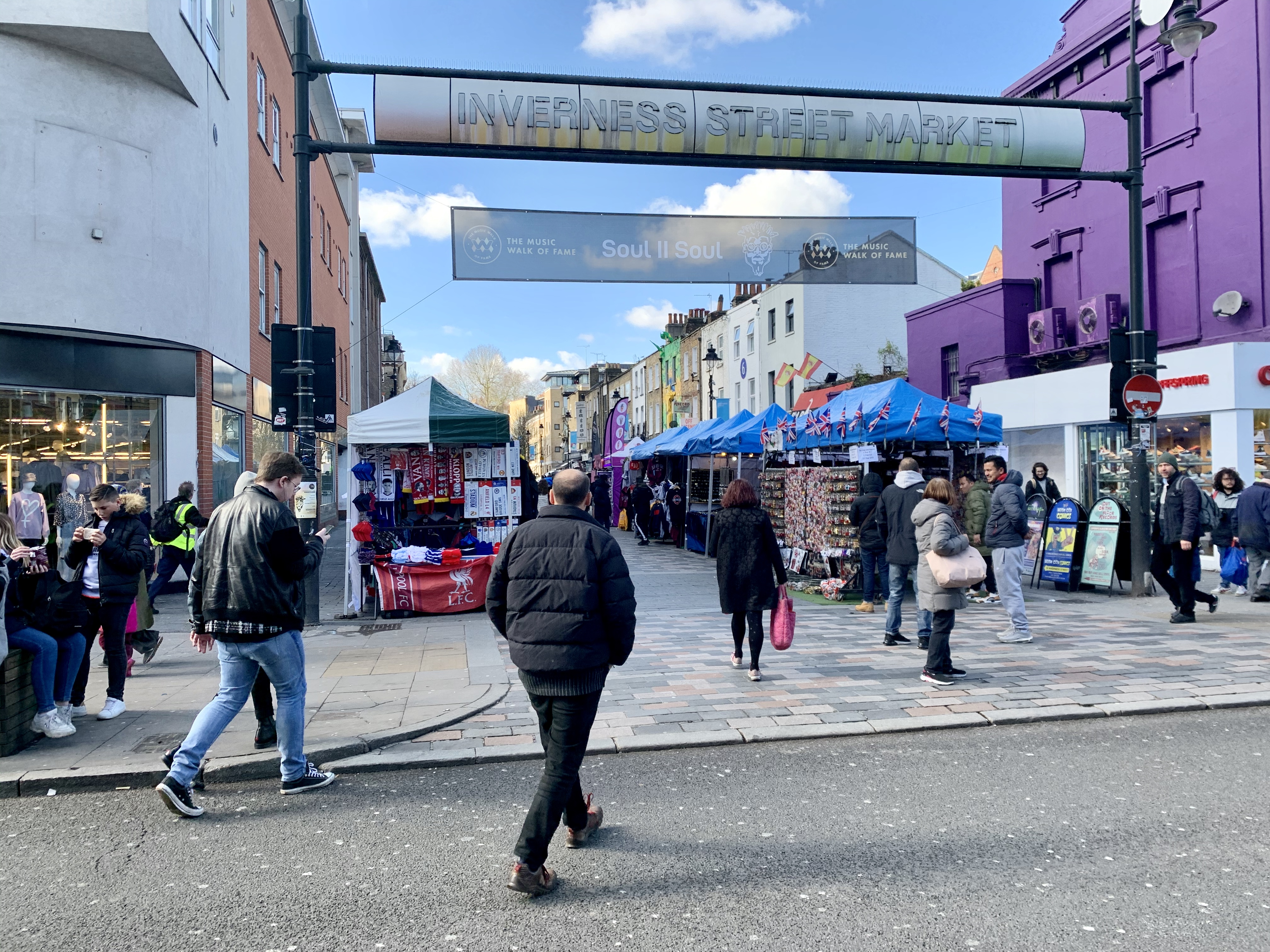
Photograph by James Ó Nuanáin of Inverness Street Market from Camden Town High Street in 2020

Until 2009 there were bus stops on Camden High Street a short walk from Inverness Street and its market. In 2009 these stops were removed, leaving a walk of a few hundred metres from the now nearest stops. After over a hundred years and following complaints for residents of the streets and local shop traders the council also insisted that the barrows be removed from the street when the market was not trading. Due to the lack of storage options, the barrows had to be destroyed and many of the remaining fruit and veg traders left.

Until the 2010s the market predominantly sold produce, including fruit and vegetables. However, as the traditional shops turned into bars and eateries to cater to Camden's booming tourist and night-time economies the market evolved towards clothing, souvenirs, and street-food.

After 2010 the market mostly sold clothing, souvenirs, and street food, with the last fruit and vegetable stand leaving some years after the nearby bus stop was closed.

== In popular culture ==
Inverness Street Market was used as a filming location in the British drama television serial The Interceptor in 2015.

== Transport ==
=== Bus ===
Many bus routes including 24, 27, 31, 88, 134, 168, and 274.

=== Railway and tube ===
The market is near Camden Town tube station, and not far from Camden Road railway station.
