= Plender Street Market =

Outdoor market in Camden, London

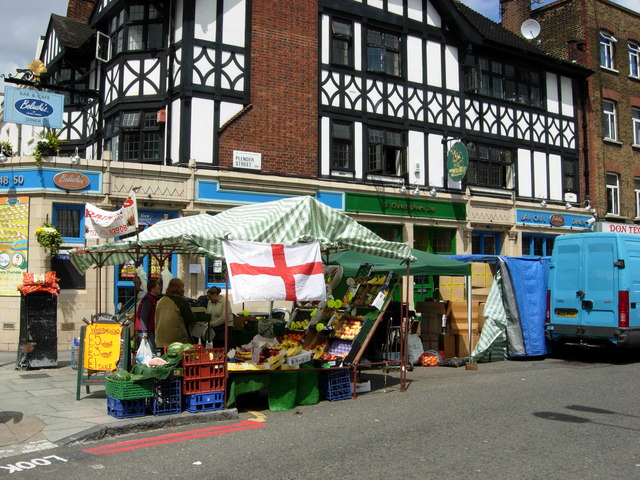
- Plender Street Market, London—2006
- Location: Plender Street; Camden Town, Camden, Greater London; 51.535896°N 0.139546°W
- Opening date: 1851 (175 years ago)
- Management: Camden London Borough Council
- Owner: Camden London Borough Council
- Environment: Outdoor
- Goods sold: Fashion, Food, Household goods
- Days normally open: Monday to Saturday
- Website: camden.gov.uk/markets
- Location within London Borough of Camden

Plender Street Market is an outdoor street market in Camden, North London. Licences to trade are issued by Camden London Borough Council.

== History ==
=== Early history (1851–1867) ===
Originally King Street but renamed in 1946 as Plender Street in honour of William Plender a former High Sheriff of the County of London. As in the case of Inverness Street Market, Plender Street Market represents a remnant of Camden Town Market which moved off of Camden High Street after the late nineteenth century electrification of horse-drawn trams.

Camden Town Market is described by Henry Mayhew in 1851 as consisting of 50 stalls.

=== Management by the police (1867–1927) ===
In 1867, section six of the Metropolitan Streets Act effectively prohibited street trading. Following public meetings and press criticism, the act was amended within weeks. Section one of the Metropolitan Streets Act Amendment Act 1867 exempted traders but they were now subject to regulation by the police.

The market was still on the High Street in 1878:

Saturday evenings the upper part of the street, thronged as it is with stalls of itinerant vendors of the necessaries of daily life, and with the dwellers in the surrounding districts, presents to an ordinary spectator all the attributes of a market place.

=== Management by local councils (1927–present) ===
==== Metropolitan Borough of St Pancras (1927–1965) ====
The London County Council (General Powers) Act 1927 replaced police regulation with a new licensing regime administered by metropolitan borough councils. From 1927 to 1965 the market was managed by the Metropolitan Borough of St Pancras.

Benedetta's The Street Markets of London makes only a passing reference to Inverness Street Market indicating that it was trading on weekdays only with mostly fruit and vegetables to purchase.

Journalist, author, and broadcaster Bernard Levin grew up on Plender Street.

==== London Borough of Camden (1965–present) ====
In 1965 the Borough of St Pancras was abolished and its area became part of the London Borough of Camden.

The market once ran to 90 pitches but had reduced down to five stalls by 1983.

== Transport ==
=== Bus ===
Bus Routes 1, 46, 214 and 253.

=== Railway and tube ===
The nearest underground stations are Mornington Crescent and Camden Town.
