= Broadway Market, London =

Street market in East London, England

Broadway Market
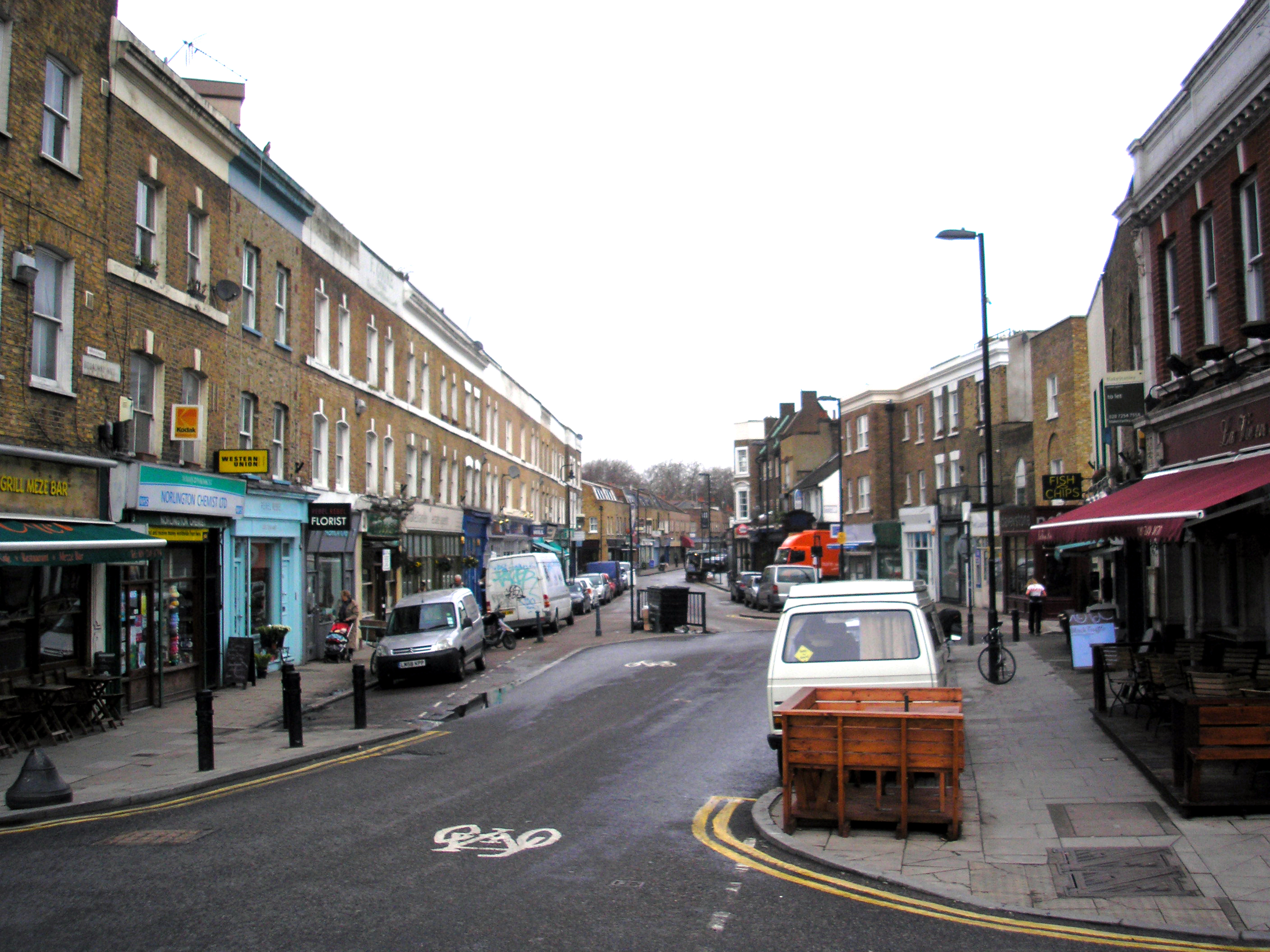
- Broadway Market looking north from the western end of Andrews Road, by Cat & Mutton Bridge

- Location within London Borough of Hackney
- Former names: Broadway London Fields, Pritchards Road, Duncan Place
- Owner: Hackney London Borough Council
- Maintained by: Hackney London Borough Council
- Length: 252 metres (827 ft)
- Location: Hackney, London E8
- Postal code: E8
- Coordinates: 51.5367°N 0.0618°W
- North: West Gate Street
- South: Pritchard's Road

Other
- Known for: street market, fashion, restaurants
- Broadway Market
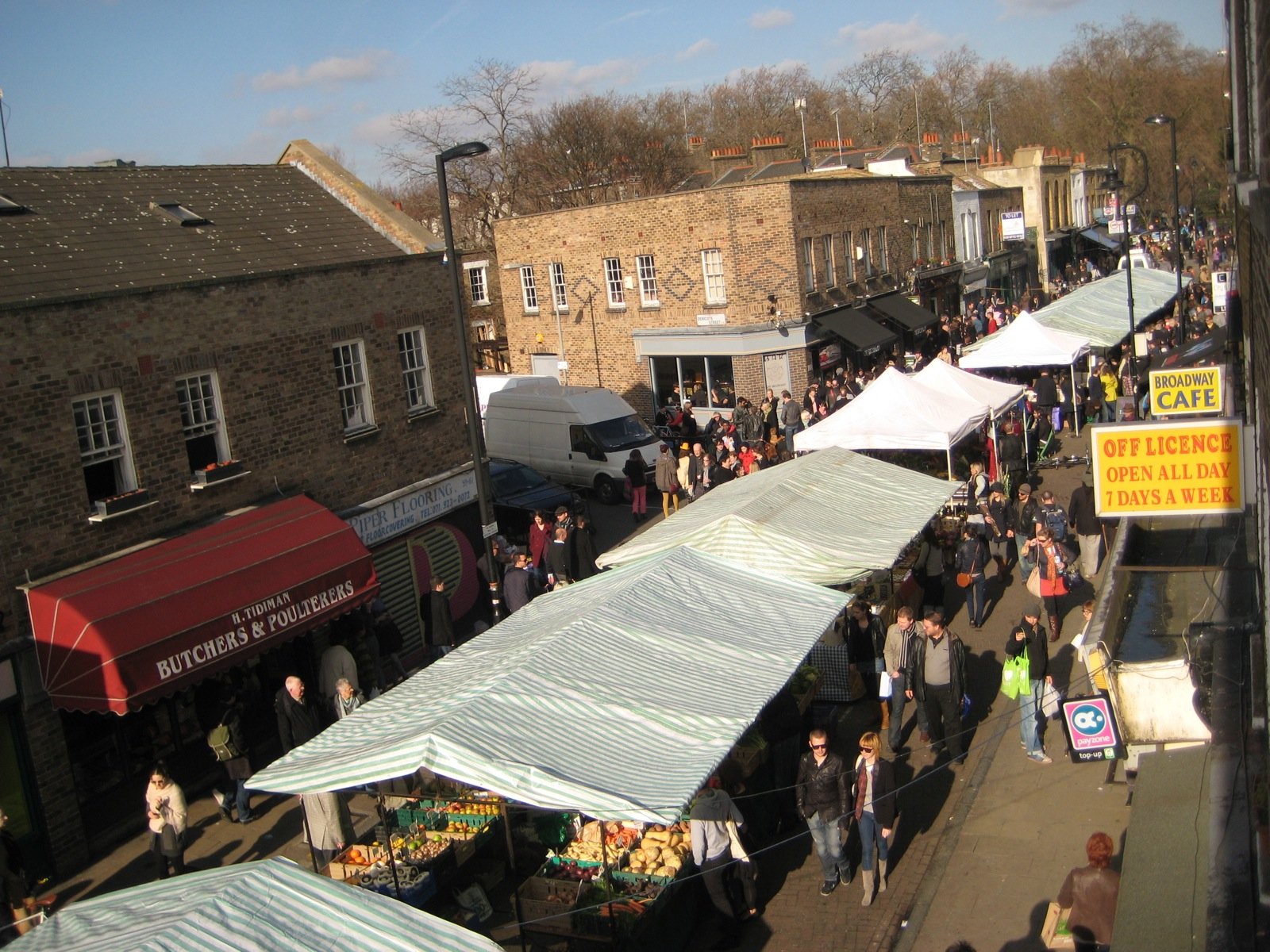
- Elevated shot of Broadway Market in 2009 looking north towards London Fields
- Location: Broadway Market E8; Hackney, London E8
- Opening date: 1883 (143 years ago)
- Management: Hackney London Borough Council
- Owner: Hackney London Borough Council
- Environment: Outdoor
- Goods sold: Street food, produce, fashion
- Days normally open: Sunday, Saturday
- Website: hackney.gov.uk/markets-traders
- Interactive map of Broadway Market

Broadway Market is a street located in Hackney, in the London Borough of Hackney, and is best known for the street market held there. Licences to trade are issued by a committee of councillors from Hackney London Borough Council.

The street is on the traditional boundary of the former Metropolitan Borough of Shoreditch (the south-west part of the street) and old Hackney borough.

== History ==
In 1893 the London County Council's Public Control Committee states that the Market had existed since 1883 on the southern end of the Street between Andrew Street and Duncan Road and consisted of 35 stalls selling: vegetables and fruit, flowers, eggs, meat, fish, bacon, earthenware, drapery, iron and tinware, mats and pails, and caps and belts. The report describes a growing market serving a local, over-crowded, working-class community.

Of the 35 stalls 10 are recorded as being run by Broadway Market shopkeepers with the remainder being independent street traders.

In 1936, whilst calling the market London Fields, Benedetta describes the market as a weekday market with a smaller presence on Sundays and reports that it has "almost every kind of stall".

Before the late 20th century, it was the site of a busy fruit and vegetable market, but this slowly dwindled over time—in the early 2000s, market activity was limited to a couple of stalls selling produce. On 8 May 2004 a food market was launched on Saturdays which has since become firmly established. Broadway Market is closed to traffic when the market is being held (9 am–5 pm). Thanks largely to the market a number of new restaurants and boutiques have opened in the area.

The ongoing development of Broadway Market has sparked a local debate about the perceived gentrification of Hackney and the way Hackney council disposed of some of their commercial property portfolio. In late 2005, a group of local protestors occupied 34 Broadway Market (Francesca's café) to bring attention to the issue. Despite being evicted on 21 December 2005 the building was successfully reoccupied on 27 December (replacing the demolished roof in the process) before the protestors were again evicted on 23 February 2006.

In 2024, Broadway Market was awarded Best Food Market by the National Association of British Market Authorities.

Recognised by Time Out magazine this is one of London’s destinations for street food with over 150 stalls each weekend, with a 2-year waiting list, offering a diverse range of cuisines. In addition to the street food appeal, it is also a haven for artisan foods.

== Transport ==
=== Bus ===
Bus Routes 26, 55, 106, 236, 254, 393, 394, D6, N26, N55, and N253.

=== Railway and tube ===
The nearest station is London Fields.

== In popular culture ==
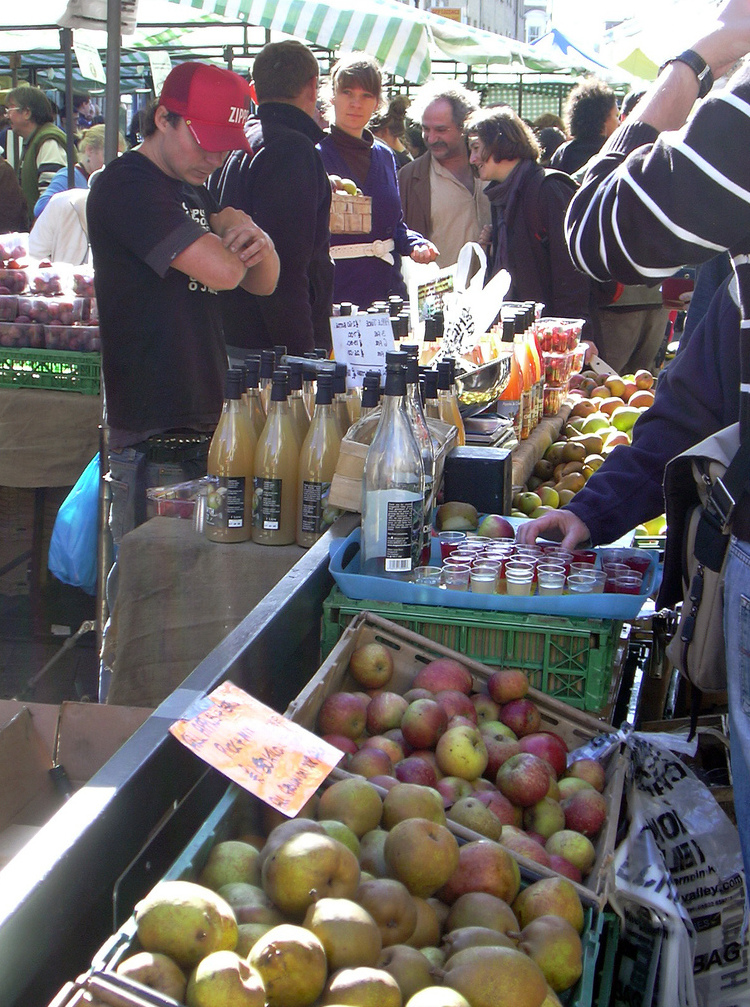
A fruit stall in the street's market

The market was the location of filming for some scenes in the 1947 film Odd Man Out, and the opening scenes of the 1988 movie Buster were shot at the Regent's Canal end of the street. The market, and specifically the barber shop, was the location for David Cronenberg's 2007 film, Eastern Promises, and the market and surrounding area appeared in the Netflix drama series Top Boy.

Along with many squares and streets in the East End of London, it is rumoured that the old Broadway Market partly inspired the BBC soap opera EastEnders.

== Gallery ==
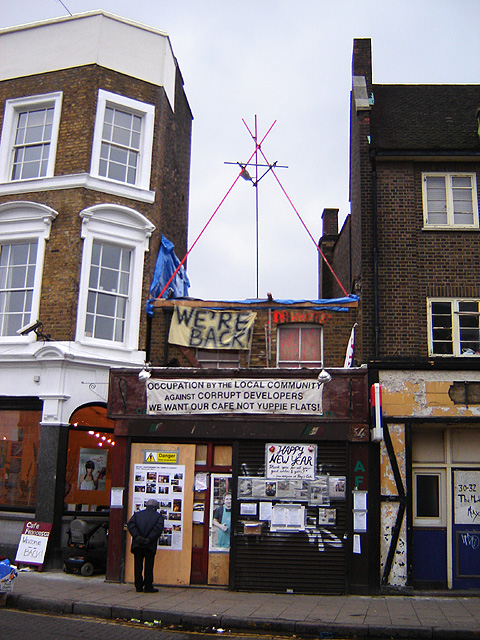
Francesca's café re-occupied after some demolition. (January 2006)

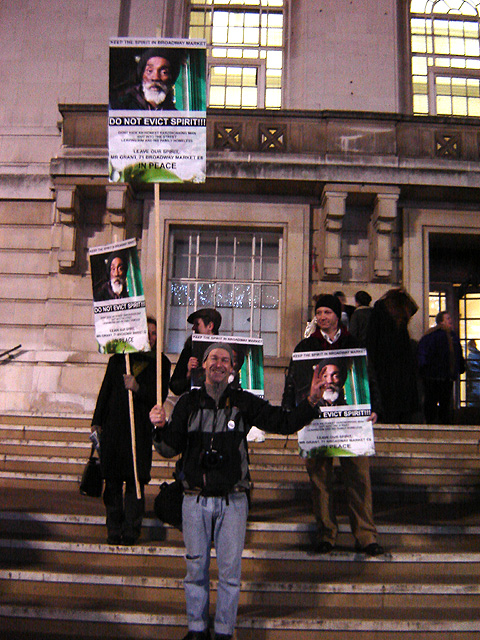
Protest at Hackney Town Hall against the proposed eviction of Spirit, a local shopowner. (February 2006)

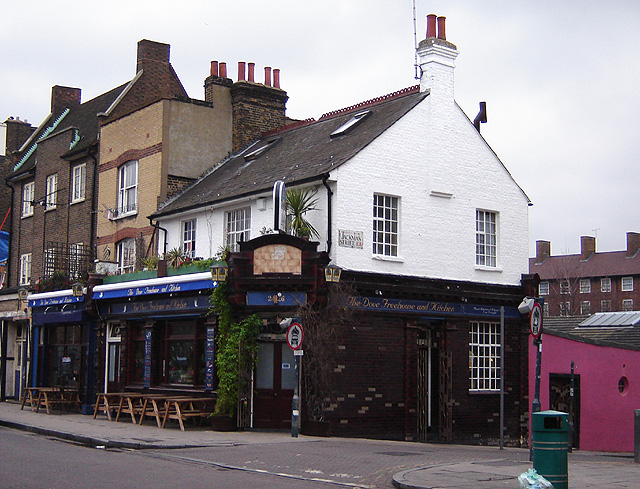
The Dove gastropub. (January 2006)

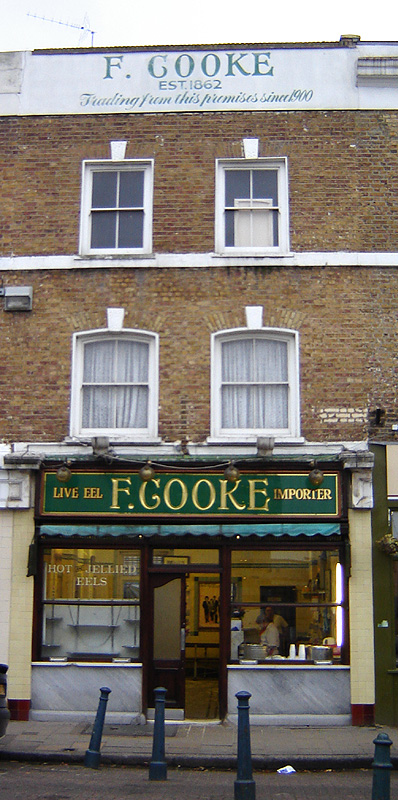
F Cooke's pie and mash shop stands at the southern entrance to Broadway Market. (January 2006). It has since been converted into a Cubitts glasses shop.

== See also ==
- Ben Eine (artist)
