= Shanta Pathak =

Co-founder of Patak food brand

- Pathak stood by a company van.
- Born: Shanta Guary Pandit; 2 February 1927; Zanzibar
- Died: 23 November 2010 (aged 83); Farnworth, Greater Manchester, England
- Occupation: Businesswoman
- Known for: Co-founder of Patak’s
- Spouse: Laxmishanker Pathak (m. 1945)
- Children: 6

Shanta Gaury Pathak (née Pandit; 2 February 1927 – 23 November 2010) was a British businesswoman of Indo-Ugandan descent, and the co-founder, alongside her husband Laxmishanker Pathak, of the Patak's brand of Indian-style curry pastes, sauces and spices.

== Early life ==
Pathak was born Shanta Gaury Pathak Pandit to Gujarati parents in Zanzibar, Tanganyika, on 2 February 1927. In 1945, she married Laxmishanker Pathak, who in 1938 had emigrated from Gujarat in British India to Mombasa, Kenya, where his eldest brother had a small business making sweets and samosas for the city's burgeoning Indian population.

With the onset of the Mau Mau Uprising, and increasing hostility, the Pathaks set sail on the passenger ship SS Uganda, stopping in Kenya and Marseilles, to England in 1956, reaching London with just £5.

== Career ==
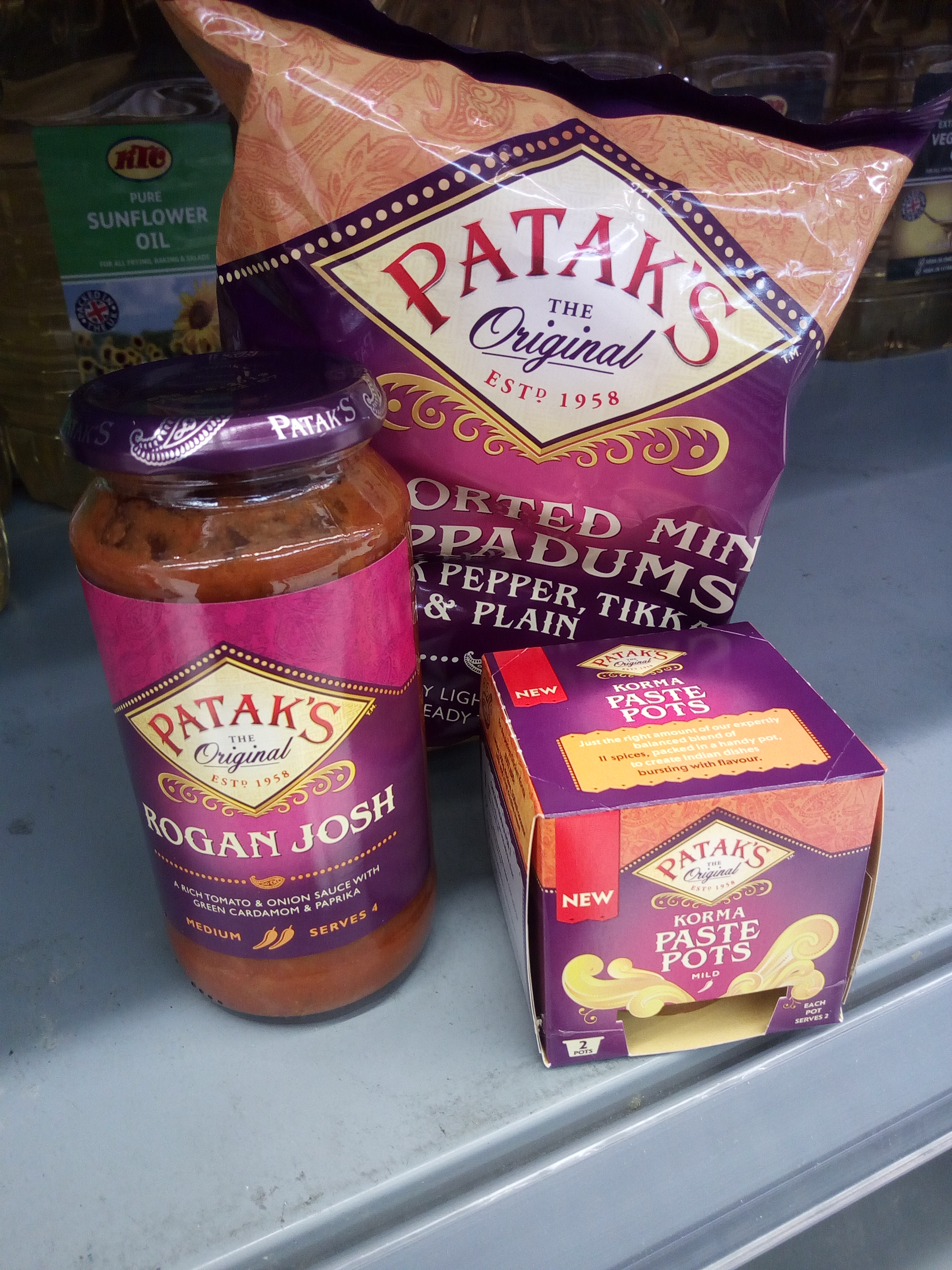
Patak's papadums, paste pot and Curry paste in 2018

Unhappy about her husband's job cleaning the drains for St Pancras Council, Pathak decided the family should start a similar business to that they had in Kenya, running a kitchen from their Queen's Crescent flat in Kentish Town.

Progress was slow, and it was several years until they had enough money to buy a small shop in Drummond Street close to Euston Station, followed by another in 1961, in Bayswater.

In 1962, their neighbours complained about the noise and smell, and the Council gave them three months to find alternative premises. They found a converted mill in Brackley, Northamptonshire, and left London. Later, they relocated to Lancashire.

Over time, the business grew to have an annual turnover of £55 million, and in 2007 was taken over by Associated British Foods for £200 million.

== Personal life ==
They had four sons and two daughters. Her husband died in 1997, but his will was unclear; prolonged family disputes and various acrimonious court cases followed his death. Pathak was a devout Hindu.

== Later life ==
Pathak died of heart failure on 23 November 2010, at the Royal Bolton Hospital, Farnworth, Bolton, and was survived by her six children.
