= William Plender, 1st Baron Plender =

British accountant and public servant (1861–1946)

The Right Honourable The Lord Plender GBE KStJ JP DL
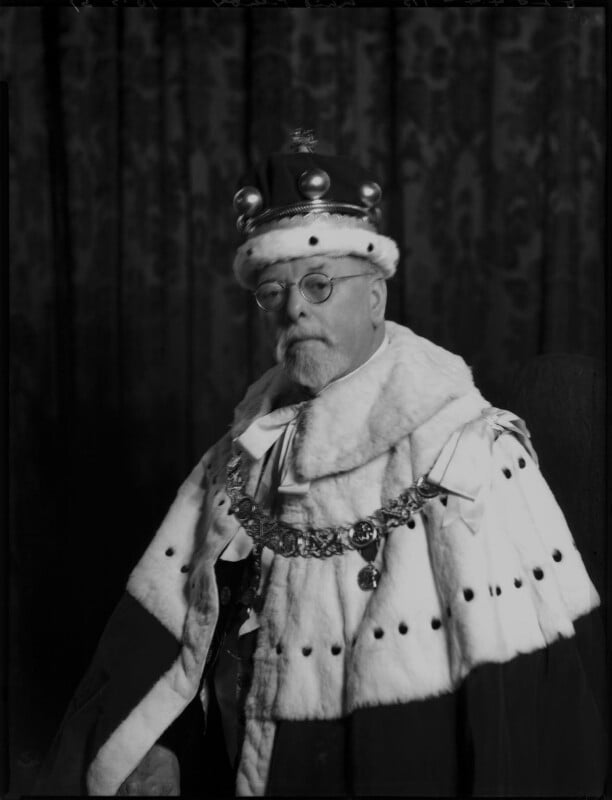
- Plender in 1937

Personal details
- Born: William Plender; 20 August 1861 Felling, County Durham, England
- Died: 19 January 1946 (aged 84)
- Occupation: Accountant

William Plender, 1st Baron Plender (20 August 1861 – 19 January 1946), known as Sir William Plender between 1911 and 1923 and as Sir William Plender, Bt, between 1923 and 1931, was a British chartered accountant and public servant.

== Background ==
Plender was born at Felling, County Durham, the son of William Plender, of The Oaks, Dalston, Northumberland, by Elizabeth Agnes Smallpiece Vardy.

== Public life ==
Plender was a partner in Deloitte, Plender, Griffiths and Company, chartered accountants, and served as President of the Institute of Chartered Accountants between 1910 and 1912. He was knighted in 1911. In 1913 he was appointed to a Royal Commission to examine the relationship between railway companies and the state, and was awarded the Order of Mercy later that year (he was honorary auditor of the League of Mercy). He was appointed one of the Welsh Church Commissioners in 1914. During the First World War he served as Treasury controller of German, Austrian and Turkish banks confiscated during the conflict from 1914 to 1918 and as financial advisor to the Board of Trade in 1918. He was made a Knight of Grace of the Venerable Order of Saint John (KStJ) and Knight Grand Cross of the Order of the British Empire (GBE) in the 1918 New Year Honours for services in connection with the War. He was further honoured in the 1923 Birthday Honours when he was created a Baronet, of Ovenden in the Parish of Sundridge in the County of Kent, in honour of his "...public services". He was later High Sheriff of the County of London between 1927 and 1928 and High Sheriff of Kent between 1928 and 1929 and was a lieutenant of the City of London. He was once again President of the Institute of Chartered Accountants from 1929 to 1930. In January 1931 he was raised to the peerage as Baron Plender, of Sundridge in the County of Kent, in recognition of his "...public services". He was also a member of the Committee on National Expenditure headed by Sir George May which published the May Report in July 1931. Plender appeared as an expert witness for the defence in the 1931 Royal Mail Case, and under cross-examination stated that it was routine for firms "of the very highest repute" to use secret reserves in calculating profit without declaring it.

Plender Street in Camden Town was renamed in his honour in 1937.

== Personal life ==
Lord Plender was twice married. He married firstly Marian Elizabeth Channon in 1891. After her death in December 1930 he married secondly Mabel Agnes Laurie, daughter of Peter George Laurie and widow of G. N. Stevens, in April 1932. Both marriages were childless. Plender died in January 1946, aged 84. The baronetcy and barony died with him. In 1931 Lord Plender donated oak bookcases, furniture and panelling to furnish a library in Royal Grammar School, Newcastle. The library, named after him, was used as a classroom until an internal refurbishment in the late 2010s. The oak bookcases remain in a first floor classroom overlooking the main hall.

Baronetage of the United Kingdom
New creation	Baronet (of Ovenden); 1923–1946	Extinct
Peerage of the United Kingdom
New creation	Baron Plender; 1931–1946	Extinct
