= Marlborough Fine Art =

Art gallery in London and New York

Coordinates: 51°30′30″N 0°8′28″W

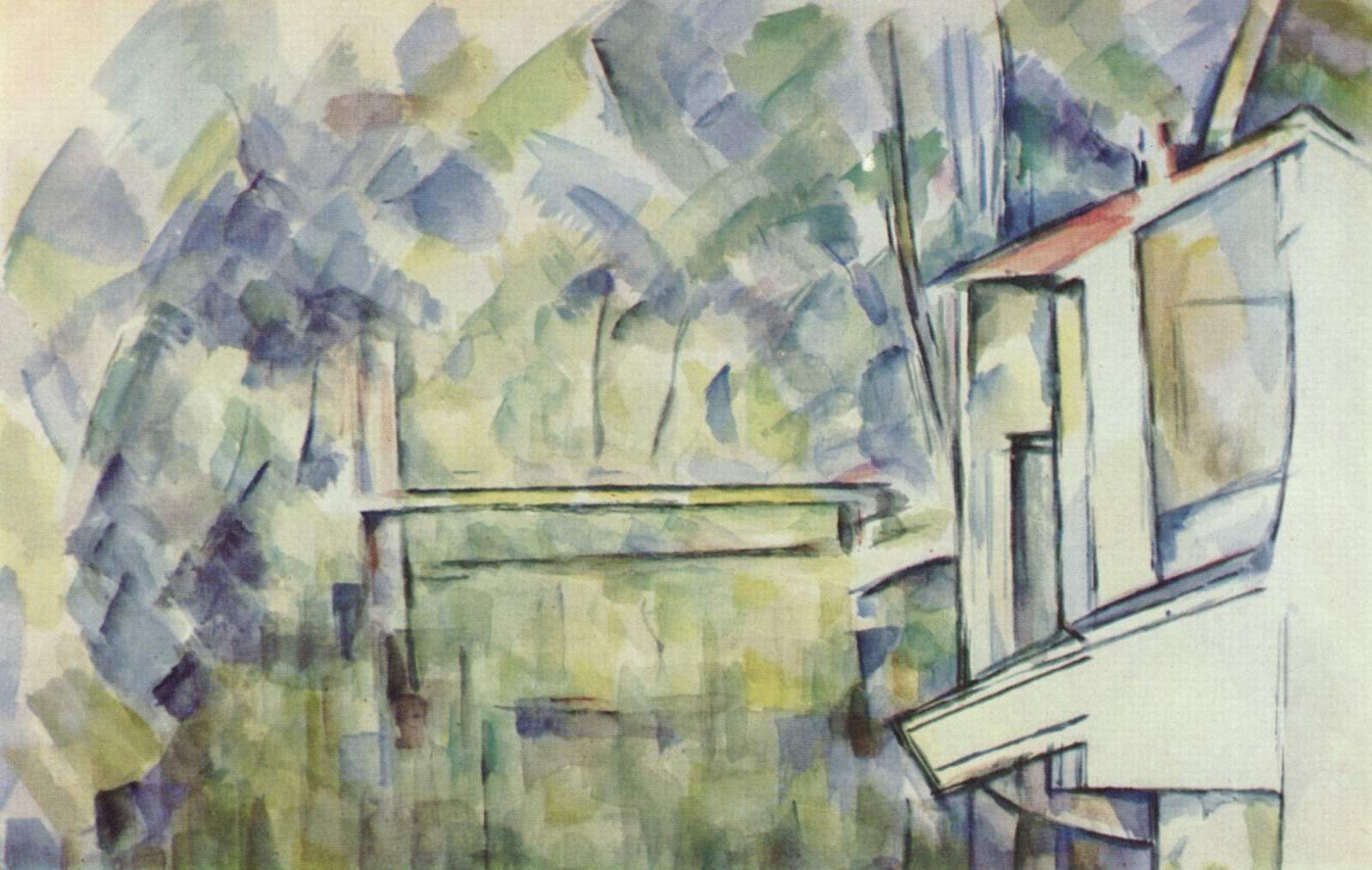
Mill on the River (1900–06) by Paul Cézanne at Marlborough Fine Art, London.

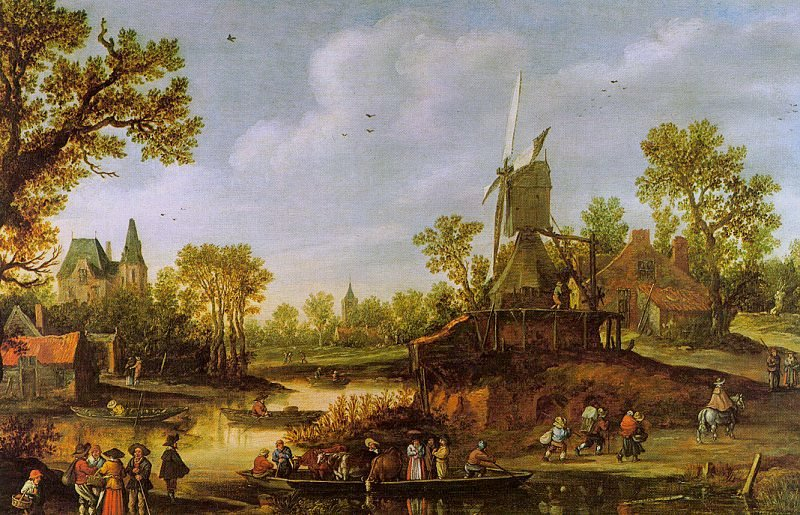
River Landscape with a Ferry (1625) by Jan van Goyen, sold by Marlborough Fine Art in 1954.

Marlborough Fine Art was founded in London in 1946 by Frank Lloyd and Harry Fischer. In 1963, a gallery was opened as Marlborough-Gerson in Manhattan, New York, at the Fuller Building on Madison Avenue and 57th Street, which later relocated in 1971 to its present location, 40 West 57th Street. The gallery operates another New York space on West 25th Street, which opened in 2007. It briefly opened a Lower East Side space on Broome Street, and later spaces in Madrid and Barcelona.

In 2024 the gallery announced that it would "wind down" all operations. No new art will be taken on, or exhibitions held, but disposing of the large stock will proceed at a gradual pace.

== History ==
In 1948, the two initial founders were joined by a third partner, David Somerset, from 1984 the Duke of Beaufort. By 1952 Marlborough was selling masterpieces of late 19th century including bronzes by Edgar Degas and paintings by Mary Cassatt, Paul Signac, Claude Monet, Camille Pissarro, Alfred Sisley, Auguste Renoir, and drawings by Constantin Guys and Vincent van Gogh.

In the late 1950s and early 1960s, Marlborough put on a string of exhibitions related to expressionism and the modern German tradition: "Art in Revolt, Germany 1905–1925", "Kandinsky, the Road to Abstraction" and "The Painters of the Bauhaus". These were followed by a Kurt Schwitters show in 1963. In the 1960s Marlborough staged exhibitions by Francis Bacon, Henry Moore, Jackson Pollock and Egon Schiele.

In the 1960s, Frank Lloyd moved to New York City, and in 1972, his son, Gilbert Lloyd, assumed control of Marlborough Fine Art in London. At this time, Pierre Levai, Frank Lloyd's nephew, took over the running of Marlborough in New York. During the 1970s and 1980s, Marlborough staged exhibitions by Frank Auerbach, Lynn Chadwick, Lucian Freud, Barbara Hepworth, R. B. Kitaj, Ben Nicholson, Victor Pasmore, John Piper, Graham Sutherland, Jacques Lipchitz, René Magritte, Max Beckmann, Max Bill, and Henri Matisse. The gallery organized the "Schwitters in Exile" exhibition of 1981, which renewed interest in the late work of this artist.

During the 1980s and 1990s, exhibitions of work by Stephen Conroy, John Davies, Bill Jacklin, Ken Kiff, and Paula Rego were held. In 1994 to 1995, R. B. Kitaj had a retrospective exhibition at the Tate Gallery, London, travelling to the Los Angeles County Museum of Art and the Metropolitan Museum, New York. In 2001, Rego showed at Abbot Hall Art Gallery & Museum in Kendal, northern England, which travelled to the Yale Center for British Art in the USA. Another retrospective exhibition of Rego's work, curated by Marco Livingstone, was shown at the Museo Nacional Centro de Arte Reina Sofía, Madrid, in 2007. The exhibition then travelled to the National Museum of Women in the Arts, Washington, D.C., in 2008. In 2005, London held an exhibition of prints by the 90-year-old Louise Bourgeois. Lucian Freud's etchings were followed by an exhibition by the American artist Dale Chihuly.

During the 1990s, Marlborough took another new step in exhibiting contemporary art from China. In 1953 Marlborough had already staged a small exhibition of two Chinese painters in London and, during the 1960s, Marlborough exhibited the abstract paintings of the Taiwanese artist Lin Sho-Yu (who worked in London under the name of Richard Lin). The gallery exhibited "New Art from China: Post 1979" at the London gallery in 1994.

In 2019, the galleries were consolidated under the direction of Max Levai. Levai began working with the organization in 2012, where he focused on creating exhibitions under the gallery subdivisions of Marlborough Chelsea and Marlborough Contemporary.

== Notable exhibitions ==
In a 2010 exhibition called "Celebrating the Muse: Women in Picasso's Prints from 1905–1968", the gallery exhibited 204 prints by Pablo Picasso.

== Rothko case ==
Before being stopped by a court ruling, Marlborough Gallery sold more than 100 paintings by the late artist Mark Rothko which it had acquired at fraudulently undervalued prices and split the profits with the Rothko executor, Theodoros Stamos, from whom it had obtained them. In 1975, a New York State court removed the executors, canceled contracts of the Rothko Estate with Marlborough and fined them and the gallery $9.2 million.
