= Patak's =

British brand of South-Asian foodstuffs

- Type: Indian food
- Industry: Food manufacture
- Founded: 1957
- Founder: Shanta Pathak; Lakshmishanker Pathak
- Headquarters: Leigh, Greater Manchester, England, United Kingdom
- Key people: Kirit Pathak OBE (1952–2021)
- Products: Ready meals, Indian sauces
- Parent: Associated British Foods
- Website: pataks.co.uk

Patak's is a UK brand of Indian-style curry pastes, sauces and spices. It was founded in 1957 by wife-and-husband team Gujarati-British entrepreneurs Shanta Pathak and Lakshmishanker Pathak, who came to Britain, penniless, with their family as refugees from Kenya, and acquired by Associated British Foods in May 2007 for £200 million.

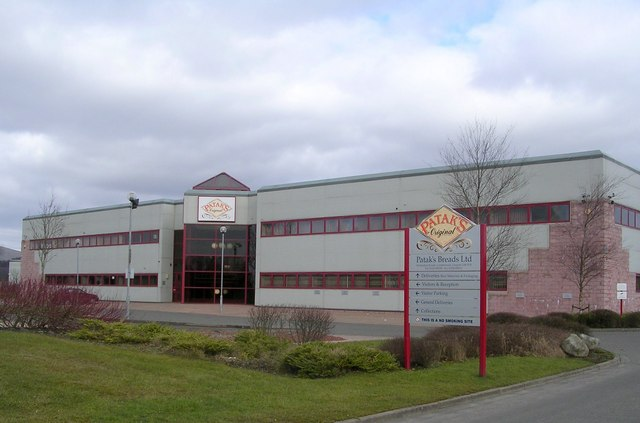
A Patak's bread company

The company supplies 75% of British curry houses with sauces and mixed spices, and supplies major retailers throughout Europe, North America, Australia and New Zealand.
