= William Turnbull (artist) =

Scottish artist

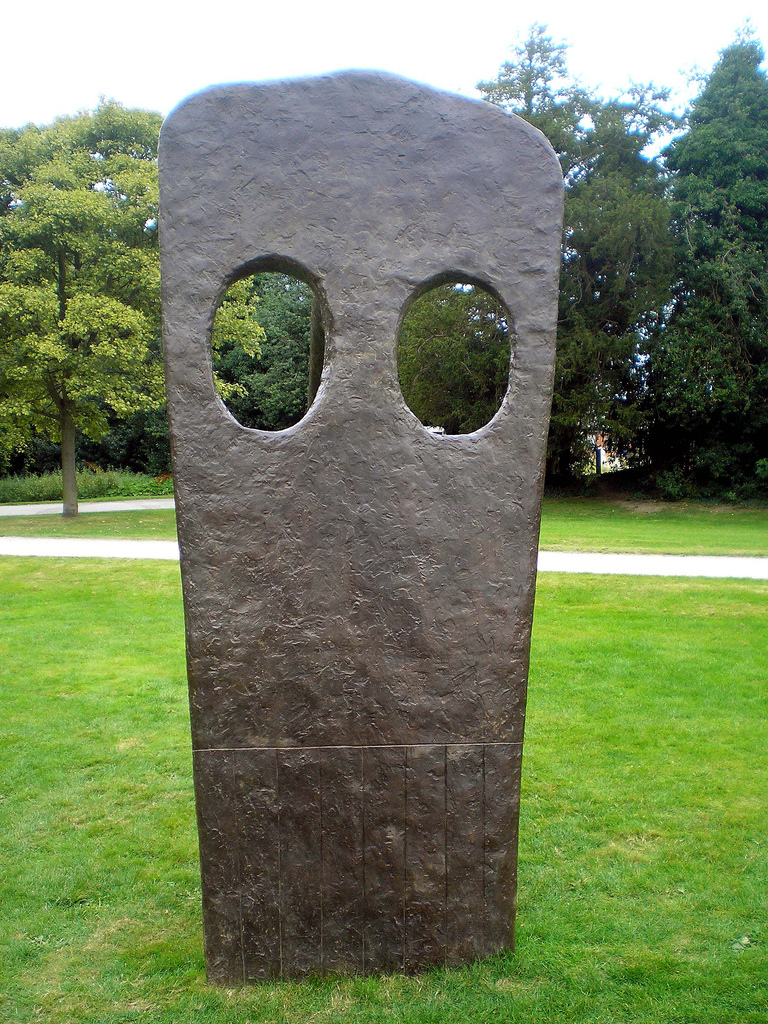
- Large Horse, Yorkshire Sculpture Park
- Born: 11 January 1922; Dundee, Scotland
- Died: 15 November 2012 (aged 90)
- Known for: Painting, sculpture

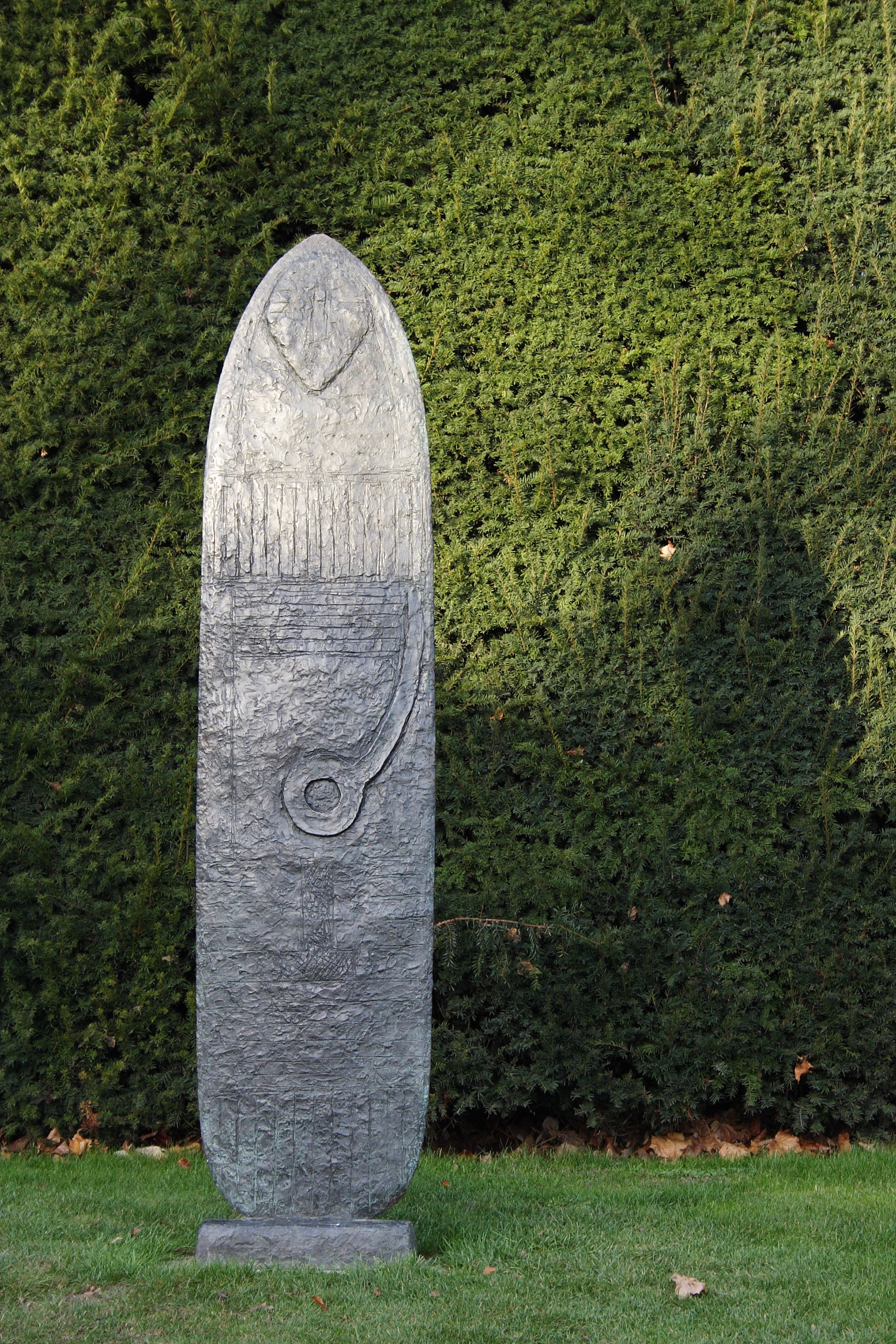
Ancestral Figure, Yorkshire Sculpture Park

William Turnbull (11 January 1922 – 15 November 2012) was a Scottish artist.

== Early life ==
William Turnbull was born in 1922 in Dundee, to John Turnbull and Anne Turnbull. Fascinated by art from an early age, Turnbull initially learned to draw by copying illustrations from magazines.

== Early career ==
When his father lost his job as a shipyard engineer during the Great Depression, a 15-year-old Turnbull was forced to leave school and find part-time work, first as a labourer and then painting film posters. He began attending an evening drawing class at Dundee University where he was taught by landscape artist James McIntosh Patrick and illustrator Fred Mould.

In 1939, he obtained a position at DC Thomson, where he had his first real exposure to commercial illustration. Through his colleagues, many of whom had attended art school, he had his first introduction to contemporary European art and literature; Cézanne and Monet were particularly important to him.

In 1941, during World War II, Turnbull was enlisted in the RAF. After training in Canada, he served as a pilot in Canada, India and Sri Lanka.

== Career ==
After the end of the war, Turnbull enrolled at The Slade School of Fine Art in London in the painting department, but he found the limited view of art and the narrow approach to technical matters not to his liking. At the time The Slade championed a nostalgic and naturalistic neo-romanticism and was suspicious of the European Impressionist and post-Impressionist that Turnbull had come to regard as valid and direct. Being older and more experienced than the rest of the students, he was not impressed or overawed by his tutors and did not change his opinions. He became disillusioned with the painting course and transferred to the sculpture department.

It was in the sculpture department that he met Eduardo Paolozzi and Nigel Henderson, who shared his interest in contemporary Continental modernist art. As he became increasingly disillusioned by the attitudes at The Slade, he relocated to Paris in 1948.

== The 1950s ==
In 1950 Turnbull had a joint exhibition with Paolozzi at the Hanover Gallery in London which was curated by David Sylvester. He returned to Paris but by the end of the year, having run out of money and unable to find a way to survive, Turnbull was forced to return to London where he took up residence. Times were hard and he was forced to take a part-time job working the night shift at a Lyons ice cream factory.

In 1952, he was included in the Young Sculptors exhibition at the Institute of Contemporary Arts (ICA) which had become the focal point for new art in London. Turnbull, along with Paolozzi and Richard Hamilton and others, became a member of the Independent Group, a splinter group within the ICA which became an important forum for discussion and debate. The Independent Group has been cited as a progenitor of Pop Art.

Turnbull was also included in New Aspects Of British Sculpture, an exhibition in the British Pavilion at the 1952 Venice Biennale selected by Herbert Read which has been described by Tim Marlow as "part of the momentum of British Art in the post war period".

In 1955, Turnbull was introduced to a young American collector Donald M. Blinken (who would subsequently become the chairman of the Rothko Foundation), who purchased one of Turnbull's sculptures, Female Standing Figure. When Turnbull travelled to New York in 1957, Blinken introduced him to a number of the leading American artists such as Mark Rothko and Barnett Newman with whom he established a close relationship.

== The 1960s and beyond ==
In 1960, Turnbull married the Singaporean artist Kim Lim. In 1962 he travelled to Japan, Cambodia, and Lim's native Singapore. A series of totemic sculptures followed which were inspired by the religious sites he visited in these travels.

Around this time he began teaching sculpture at the Central School of Art. Having learned to weld in the foundry he created there with colleague Brian Wall, Turnbull began to work with stainless steel, a medium he would continue to work with for the next eight years.

In 1967 he began to work with perspex and fibreglass, materials he valued for their reflective quality and transparency.

In 1973, Turnbull had a major retrospective exhibition at the Tate Gallery which was curated by Richard Morphet. Seeing all his work placed together like this in a single exhibition caused Turnbull to rethink the direction of his work and he began to move away from the steel and more modular sculptures he had been creating and began a return to the more molded, textured work of his early career.

Turnbull subsequently exhibited at the Whitechapel Gallery, and had retrospectives at both the Serpentine and at Yorkshire Sculpture Park, as well as numerous prestigious overseas exhibitions and a survey exhibition at the Tate's Duveen Hall in 2006. He later had a show at Waddington Galleries which featured previously unseen paintings and sculpture.

== Personal life ==
Married to Kim Lim, the couple had two sons, Alex and Johnny. Both his sons are members of the music group 23 Skidoo. In 2012 Alex Turnbull co-directed Beyond Time, a documentary film about his father, scored by 23 Skidoo and narrated by Jude Law.

Turnbull died in London on 15 November 2012.
