= Kim Lim =

Singaporean-British sculptor (1936–1997)

- Born: 16 February 1936; Singapore, United Kingdom
- Died: 23 October 1997 (aged 61); London, England
- Education: Saint Martin's School of Art, Slade School of Fine Art
- Style: Sculpture, Printmaking

Kim Lim (16 February 1936 – 23 October 1997) was a Singaporean-British sculptor and printmaker of Chinese descent. She is most recognized for her abstract wooden and stone-carved sculptures that explore the relationship between art and nature, and works on paper that developed alongside her sculptural practice. Lim's attention to the minute details of curve, line and surface made her an exponent of minimalism.

== Early life ==
Kim Lim was born in Singapore and spent much of her early childhood in Penang and Malacca. During her teenage years in Singapore, Lim trained in ballet. At the age of 18, she completed her education in Singapore and moved to London to enroll at Saint Martin's School of Art (1954–1956). There, she took a particular interest in wood-carving; she then transferred to the Slade School of Fine Art, where she pursued on sculpting and printmaking, graduating in 1960.

== Career and works ==
Kim Lim, Column, 1971–72, Stainless steel, 5 parts, each 21.7 x 27 x 51 cm, Collection of National Gallery Singapore

In the 1960s and 1970s, her sculptures were mainly carved from wood, using forms inspired by basic rhythmic forms and structures, with each element forming a balanced whole. Lim's formative love of dance may have been a catalyst with her engagement with themes of rhythm, music and movement. Candy (1975) is one of the sculptures that exemplifies these characteristics, showing the artist's interest in balance, colour, form and her concept of 'less elaboration and more strength'. Her stainless steel sculpture, Column (1971–72), has been seen as an instance of minimalist art in Britain. Her prints from this time also explore these modulations, as in the etchings Set of Eight (1975), which consist of simple patterns of blocks and lines. After her twenty-year retrospective towards the end of the 70s, Lim began transitioning to working in stone and marble, which were included in the exhibition alongside her wood forms: ‘it made me very aware of the pull within myself between the ordered, static experience and the dynamic rhythms of organic, structured forms,’ she concluded. ‘How to incorporate and synthesize these two seemingly opposed elements within one work became … the starting point for the … stone sculptures.’

At the First Hayward Annual in 1977, Kim Lim was both the only woman and the only non-white artist represented, her work appearing alongside that of notable male contemporaries such as Frank Auerbach and Kenneth Martin. There was growing recognition of systemic sexist bias within the art world at this time. For the Second Hayward Annual, in an attempt to redress this balance and make a public statement about gendered selection-bias, an all-female selection committee was formed comprising Kim Lim, Tess Jaray, Liliane Lijn, Rita Donagh and Gillian Wise Ciobaratu.

During the 1980s, Kim Lim turned to stone-carving, and continued to make prints and fill sketchbooks with drawings from nature. In Sea-Stone (1989; London, Tate), the marble has been carved with incised lines and textures so that the stone both seems to be worn by the sea.

In the 1990s she became more concerned with imbuing the stone with a lightness and softness, as in Syncopation No. 2 (1995), where a large piece of slate has been slashed with regular cuts, so that it appears almost as a drawing rather than a solid form. During her career she travelled to China, Indonesia, Cambodia, Egypt, Malaysia and Turkey with her husband, artist William Turnbull. During these travels, the artists engaged with artist communities in America, 'notably Abstract Expressionists such as Mark Rothko, but also embedding themselves in the cultures of the Middle East, East, and Southeast Asia.'

While Kim Lim was well-known and respected among artists and collectors during her lifetime, her work has been slow to be recognized internationally. Contrary to the popular assumption that Turnbull influenced her, close friends and family—such as their son Alex Turnbull and artist Tessa Jaray—have suggested that the exchange for creativity was mutual. As Bianca Chu writes in Ocula Magazine, on the occasion of the artist's spotlight exhibition at Tate Britain in 2020, 'her determination to leave Singapore, a home and a life path that was comfortable and without risk, for London, and her eventual absorption into and of her new home, reveals a mutability and elasticity characteristic and constitutive of her artistic practice.'

== Exhibitions ==
=== Selected solo exhibitions ===
- Axiom Gallery, London, 1966.
- Axiom Gallery, London. 1968.
- Waddington Galleries, London, 1973. (prints)
- Alpha Gallery, Singapore, 1974.
- Museum of Modern Art, Oxford, 1975. (prints)
- Felicity Samuel Gallery, London, 1975. (sculpture and prints)
- Tate Gallery, London, 1977. (temporary 'print' exhibitions)
- The Roundhouse Gallery, London, 1979.
- Southampton Museum and Art Gallery, 1981. (prints)
- Nicola Jacobs Gallery, London, 1982.
- Arcade Gallery, Harrogate, 1983.
- Nicola Jacobs Gallery, London, 1984. (prints and drawings)
- National Museum of Art, Singapore, 1984.
- Nicola Jacobs Gallery, London, 1985.
- Waddington Galleries, London, 1990.
- 'Orangery Show', Roche Court, New Art Centre, Wiltshire, 1993.
- Flowers East, London, 1993. (prints)
- Yorkshire Sculpture Park, Wakefield, 1995.
- Camden Arts Centre, London, 1999.
- New Arts Centre, Roche Court, Wiltshire, 2014.
- S2, London, 2018
- Kim Lim: Sculpting Light, STPI - Creative Workshop & Gallery, Singapore, 2018.

=== Selected group exhibitions ===
- 26 Young Sculptors, I.C.A., London, 1961.
- Deuxieme Biennale de Paris, Paris, 1961.
- Sculpture Today & Tomorrow, Bear Lane Gallery, Oxford, 1962.
- 3rd International Biennale of Prints, Tokyo, 1962.
- Sculpture in the Open Air, Battersea Park, London, 1966.
- Chromatic Sculpture, Arts Council Gallery, Cambridge, 1966.
- 25 Camden Artists, Camden Central Library, 1966.
- Expo ’67, British Pavilion, Montreal, 1967.
- Transatlantic Graphics, Camden Arts Centre, London, 1967.
- Leicestershire Collection, Whitechapel Art Gallery, London, 1967.
- Nagaoka Prize Exhibition, Nagaoka Museum, Japan, 1967.
- Sculpture 1960–67 from the Arts Council Collection, Cumberland House Museum, Portsmouth; touring to Worcester; Leeds; Swindon; Hull; Walsall; Oldham; Plymouth; Leamington; Accrington; King's Lynn; Lincoln; Stafford; Bolton; Doncaster; Sunderland; St. Ives; Southampton; Stockport; Kidderminster; Mansfield; Derby; Birkenhead; Falmouth; Folkestone; Cheltenham; Norwich; Reading; Brighton; Lincoln; Southend, 1967–70.
- Sculpture in a City, Arts Council exhibition; touring to Post & Mail Building, Birmingham; Goree Piazza, Liverpool; Southampton Civic Centre, 1968.
- Summer Exhibition, Museum of Modern Art, Oxford, 1968.
- Prospect ’68, Düsseldorf, 1968.
- Mostra Mercato d’Arte Contemporanea, Florence, 1968.
- Open Air Sculpture, Middelheim, Antwerp, 1969.
- British Sculpture out of the Sixties, I.C.A., London. 1970
- 3me Salon Internationale de Galeries Pilotes, Musée Cantal des Beaux Arts, Lausanne, and Musée d’Art Moderne de la Ville, Paris, 1970.
- Rottweil Festival, Rottweil, Germany, 1974.
- Print Biennale, Ljubliana, Yugoslavia, 1975.
- Inaugural Exhibition, National Museum of Art, Singapore, 1976.
- Hayward Annual, Hayward Gallery, London, 1977.
- International Biennale of Prints, Tokyo, 1979.
- 69th British International Print Biennale, Bradford, 1979.
- Biennale of European Graphic Art, Heidelberg, Germany, 1979.
- The First Exhibition, Nicola Jacobs Gallery, London, 1979.
- Norwegian International Print Biennale, Fredikstad Library, Norway, 1980.
- Sculpture, Nicola Jacobs Gallery, London, 1980.
- Print Biennale, Ljubliana, Yugoslavia, 1981.
- Summer Exhibition, Nicola Jacobs Gallery, London, 1981.
- Camden Artists, Camden Arts Centre, London, 1981.
- Sculpture for the Blind, Tate Gallery, London, 1981.
- Women's Art Show 1550–1950, Nottingham Castle Museum, Nottingham, 1982.
- British Sculpture 1951–1980, Whitechapel Art Gallery, London, 1982.
- Group Show, Yorkshire Sculpture Park, 1984.
- Contemporary Carving, Plymouth Arts Centre; touring to Cartwright Hall, Bradford; Harris Museum & Art Gallery, Preston; Herbert Gallery, Coventry; Axiom Centre for the Arts, Cheltenham; South Hill Park Arts Centre, Bracknell, 1984–1985.
- Beyond Appearance, Castle Museum, Nottingham; touring to Milton Keynes Exhibition Gallery; Wolverhampton Art Gallery; Carmarthen Museum; Oriel Theatre, Clwyd; Cooper Gallery, Barnsley, 1985.
- Bradford Print Biennale, Bradford, 1986.
- Premeio Internazionale Biella Per L'Incisione 1987, Turin, 1987.
- Black & White, Nicola Jacobs Gallery, London, 1987.
- Stoneworks, Powys Castle, Welshpool, Wales, 1988.
- Sculpture, Waddington Galleries, London, 1988.
- Abstract Art from Sheffield's Collections, Mappin Art Gallery, Sheffield, 1988.
- The Cutting Edge, Manchester City Art Gallery, 1989.
- Art Asia '92, New Art Centre stand, Hong Kong, 1992.
- Light and Shadow, Wrexham Arts Centre, Wales, 1992.
- New Displays, Tate Gallery, London, 1992.
- Sculpture, Waddington Galleries, London, 1992.
- Sculpture Garden at Roche Court, New Art Centre, Wiltshire, 1993.
- Tresors Fair, Singapore, 1994.
- British Abstract Art Part 2: Sculpture, Flowers East, London, 1995.
- Sculpture Garden at Roche Court, New Art Centre, Wiltshire, 1995.
- Journeys West, University Gallery and Firstsite at the Minories, Colchester; touring exhibition organised by University of Essex, Chinese Arts Centre, Manchester, Lambeth Chinese Community Association and Firstsite, Colchester, 1995.
- White Out, Curwen Gallery, London, 1995.
- Ka Editions, The Eagle Gallery, London, 1995.
- British Abstract Art Part 3: Works on Paper, Flowers East, London, 1996.
- Daiga Grantina Notes on Kim Lim, Kunstmuseum Appenzell, 20 October 2024 – 4 May 2025

Work in public collections

- National Museum of Art, Singapore
- Museum of Modern Art, Nagaoka, Japan
- Fukuyama City Museum, Hiroshima, Japan
- Middelheim Open Air Museum, Antwerp
- M+, Hong Kong
- Tate
- Arts Council Collection
- Contemporary Art Society
- Government Art Collection
- The Hepworth Wakefield
