= Ken Kiff =

English painter (1935–2001)

Ken Kiff RA
- Born: 29 May 1935; Dagenham
- Died: 15 February 2001 (aged 65); London
- Education: Hornsey School of Art (1955–61)
- Known for: Painting; illustration; teaching
- Elected: RA (1991)
- Website: kenkiff.com

Ken Kiff, RA (29 May 1935 – 15 February 2001) was an English figurative artist, who was born in Dagenham and trained at Hornsey School of Art 1955-61. He came to prominence in the 1980s thanks to the championship of art critic Norbert Lynton, and a cultural climate intent on re-assessing figurative art following the Royal Academy's ‘New Spirit in Painting’ exhibition in 1981. He started exhibiting at Nicola Jacob's gallery, moved to Fischer Fine Art in 1987, and finally to the Marlborough Gallery in 1990, by which time he had begun exhibiting internationally and had work in major public collections. He was elected to the Royal Academy of Arts in 1991 and became Associate Artist at the National Gallery 1991–93. His 30-year teaching career at Chelsea School of Art and the Royal College influenced a generation of students.

Despite his success, Kiff's position was never a comfortable one. His commitment to the pictorial values of modernism, his deep respect for artists such as Klee, Miro or Marc Chagall, and his ideas about painting were often at odds with prevailing assumptions. In contemporary debates around abstraction versus figuration he tended to push past the battle-lines: ‘colour thinking’ as opposed to ‘image thinking’, pictorial form versus representational meaning, in order to get at something beneath their seeming differences. Images themselves arose out of the stuff of painting and an intimate relationship with a technique. His deep personal knowledge of poetry and music informed his sense of a painting's structure. He saw colour in terms of images and images in terms of colour, which constituted, as he saw it, “the natural complexity of painting”.

Colour and colour relationships interacted in his paintings with a range of images, evoking the radiant and lyrical, to the comic, and grotesque. ‘Fantasy’ as he saw it ‘was a way of thinking about reality’. The matter-of-fact imagery of streets, houses, trees, animals and people was configured with dreamlike encounters and happenings in a way that invited the viewer into an internal world constantly using the external world as its subject-matter.

‘The Sequence’ begun in the 1970s, and by the time of his death, constituting nearly 200 works represented a striking formal innovation. Regarded by Kiff as a single work, it was a series of pictures (acrylic on paper), forming a chain, repeating and developing imagery and colour, and allowing their networks of association to move and develop laterally across many formats, with a single energy carrying them along.

By the late 1980s his range of media had expanded to include woodcuts, monotypes, lithography and etching. He enjoyed how new ways of working with materials, the grain of the wood, for example, or the wax in the encaustics, could extend his visual thinking and force him to make decisions more quickly. He took great pleasure in collaborating with master printmaking technicians such as Dorothea Wight and Mark Balakjian in Britain, Erik Hollgersson in Sweden, and Garner Tullis in the US.

== Selected solo exhibitions ==
- 1979 Gardner Centre Gallery, University of Sussex
- 1980 Nicola Jacobs Gallery, London
- 1981 Talbot Rice Art Centre, Edinburgh
- 1982 Edward Thorp Gallery, New York
- 1986 Ken Kiff Paintings * 1965-85, Serpentine Gallery, London, Arnolfini Gallery, Bristol
- 1988 Fischer Fine Art, London
- 1991 Ken Kiff, Recent Work, Marlborough Fine Art, London
- 1993-94 Ken Kiff at the National Gallery, London
- 1996 Marlborough Fine Art & Graphics, London
- 2001 Retrospective Paintings, Works on Paper, Prints, Marlborough Fine Art, London
- 2008 Ken Kiff Paintings and Works on Paper, Marlborough Fine Art, London
- 2019 Ken Kiff: The Sequence, Sainsbury Centre for Visual Arts

== Selected group exhibitions ==
- 1970 Critic's Choice, selected by Norbert Lynton, Arthur Tooth & Sons, London
- 1973 Magic and Strong Medicine, selected by Norbert Lynton, Walker Art Gallery, Liverpool
- 1979 Narrative Painting, selected by Timothy Hyman, Arnolfini Gallery, Bristol
- 1981 New Works on Paper 1, curated by John Elderfield, Museum of Modern Art, New York
- 1982 Issues: New Allegory 1, curated by Elisabeth Sussman, Institute of Contemporary Art, Boston
- 1983 Alive to it All, Serpentine Gallery, London
- 1984 The British Art Show, Ikon Gallery and City Gallery Museum, Birmingham
- 1987 Current Affairs, British Painting and Sculpture in the 80s, Museum of Modern Art, Oxford and British Council touring
- 1989 Tree of Life, Southbank Centre, London, Corner House Gallery, Manchester
- 1990 Nine Contemporary Painters, A Personal Choice, selected by Andrew Lambirth, City of Bristol Museum and Art Gallery
- 1994 Here and Now, Serpentine Gallery, London
- 1997 British Figurative Art, Painting, The Human Figure
- 2001 Tell me a Picture, selected by Quentin Blake, The National Gallery, London

== Selected bibliography ==
- 1979 Norbert Lynton, Ken Kiff, Gardner Centre Gallery, Sussex University, catalogue Introduction
- 1979 Martha Kapos, Ken Kiff, Gardner Centre Gallery, Sussex University, catalogue Introduction
- 1979 Timothy Hyman, Ken Kiff, Artscribe no 17
- 1980 Peter Fuller, Ken Kiff, Art Monthly no 34; reprinted in The Naked Artist, Writers and Readers, * 1983
- 1980 Michael Mason, In Pursuit of Visual Rhymes, TLS, 22 Feb.
- 1981 Stuart Bradshaw, Ken Kiff, Talbot Rice Art Centre, Edinburgh, catalogue Introduction
- 1981 John Elderfield, New Work on Paper 1, Museum of Modern Art, New York, catalogue Introduction
- 1981 John Ashbery, Pleasures of Paper Work, Newsweek, 16 March
- 1981 Hilton Kramer, Expressionism Returns to Painting, New York Times, 12 July
- 1983 Iain Biggs, Uses and Abuses of Myth, Artscribe no 38 Jan
- 1985 Timothy Hyman, The Meeting of Contrasted Elements, Ken Kiff Paintings * 1965-85, Arts Council catalogue
- 1985 Martha Kapos, Illuminating Images, Ken Kiff Paintings * 1965-85, Arts Council catalogue
- 1985 Michael Sheperd, The British Show, Art Gallery New South Wales, catalogue Introduction
- 1988 Marina Warner, The Tree of Life: New Images of an Ancient Symbol, Southbank Centre, Spring
- 1988 Martha Kapos, Ken Kiff, Art Monthly, no 118 July August
- 1989 Malcolm Miles, Shadows and Rainbows, Ken Kiff, Alba, April
- 1991 Andrew Lambirth, In conversation with the Artist, Ken Kiff, The Artist's and Illustrator's Magazine, no 54, March
- 1993 Ken Kiff, Thoughts on Being at the National Gallery, and Norbert Lynton, catalogue Introduction, October
- 1993 Richard Cork, Unfinished Business on his Easel, The Times, 7 Dec
- 1997 Malcolm Miles, Something Unknown must be Eaten or Drunk, Point – Art + Design Research Journal, no 5 spring/summer
- 1998 Norbert Lynton: Ken Kiff's Sequence, Ed. Iain Biggs, MakingSpace Publishers, Bristol
- 1999 Andrew Lambirth, Ken Kiff and the Weather in the Soul, Marlborough Fine Art, London, catalogue introduction
- 2001 Andrew Lambirth, Ken Kiff, Thames and Hudson, London
