= Street markets in London =

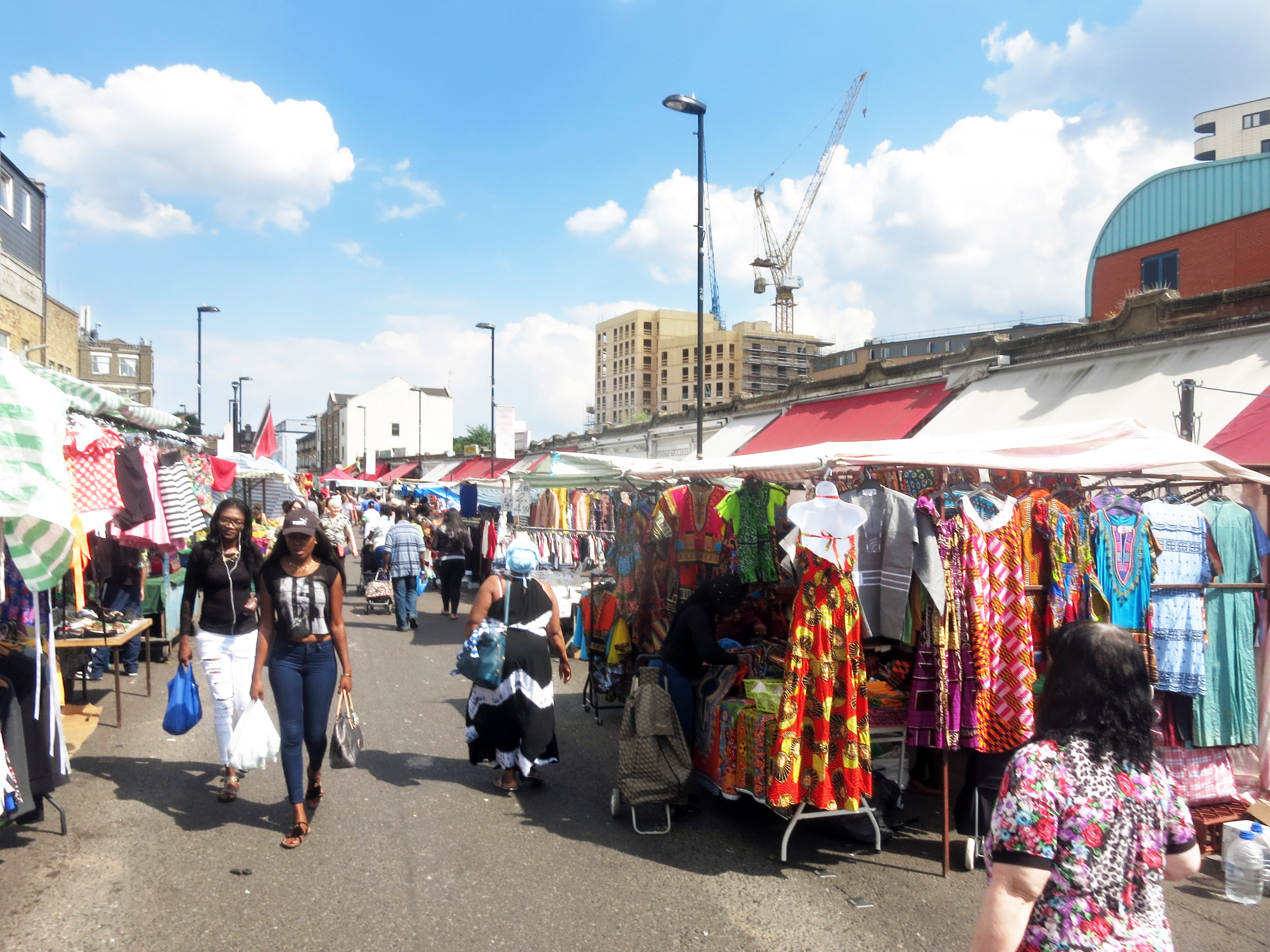
Ridley Road Market in Hackney, 2016

Street trading is selling from a stall, stand, or vehicle in the street rather than in a market hall or square. A collection of regular, and adjacent, street traders forms a street market. Where traders operate on their own, from a regular location, these are variously described as isolated pitches, scattered sites, or miscellaneous sites. Peripatetic traders are termed pedlars.

== History ==
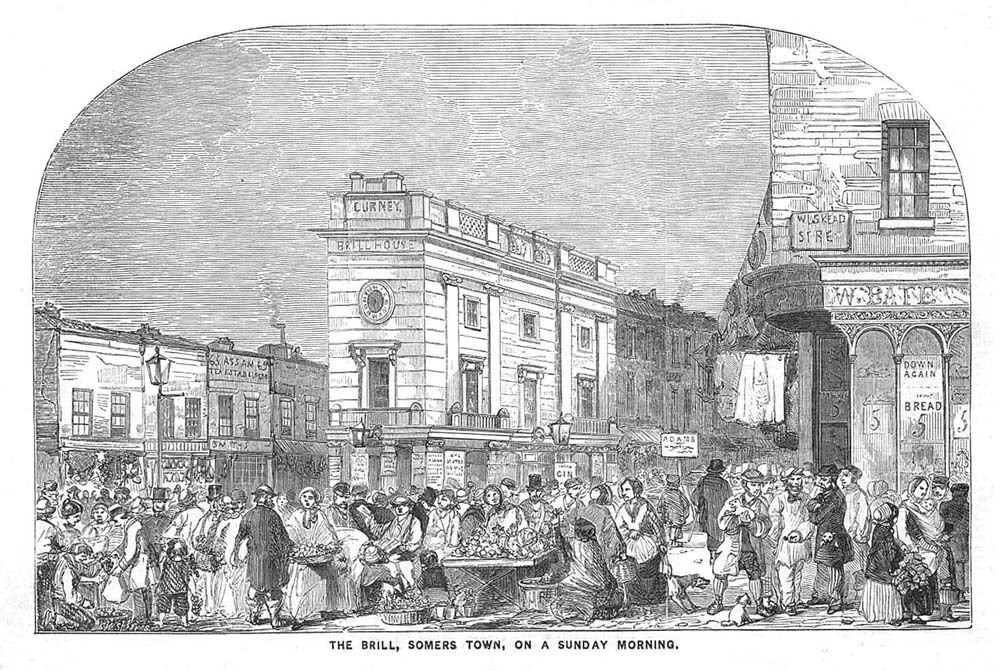
The Brill in Somers Town circa 1858

Cheapside was the oldest known market in London, possibly established in the late ninth century during the reign of King Alfred.

The large number of street markets in London is due to the 1327 granting of market rights to the City of London. This allowed the city to control the establishment of markets within a radius of six and two thirds miles [10.7 km] "being the distance a person could be expected to walk to market, sell his produce and return in a day". The city's market rights caused London's markets to develop differently from the rest of England in their own legislative framework.

The City of London used these rights to prevent the establishment of private markets within the growing urban area outside of the city. Since shops were still a rarity and street trading fell outside the definition of a market, street traders would collect produce from the city's wholesale markets and wheel it to busy thoroughfares on carts from which they would then sell. This practice continued into the late twentieth century:

Albert died when George was 12 and he left school to earn a living. He was charged with taking a horse-pulled cart to Covent Garden, load up with produce, and drive it through crowded streets to Inverness Street Market, where his brother Billy ran stalls.

Traders were self-regulating. They paid no fees and were subject to no legislation or bylaws.

=== London Labour and the London Poor ===
Henry Mayhew’s 1851 survey of London lists 37 street markets comprising 3,137 stalls with an additional 9,000 street traders not fixed to a street market.

=== Early regulation ===
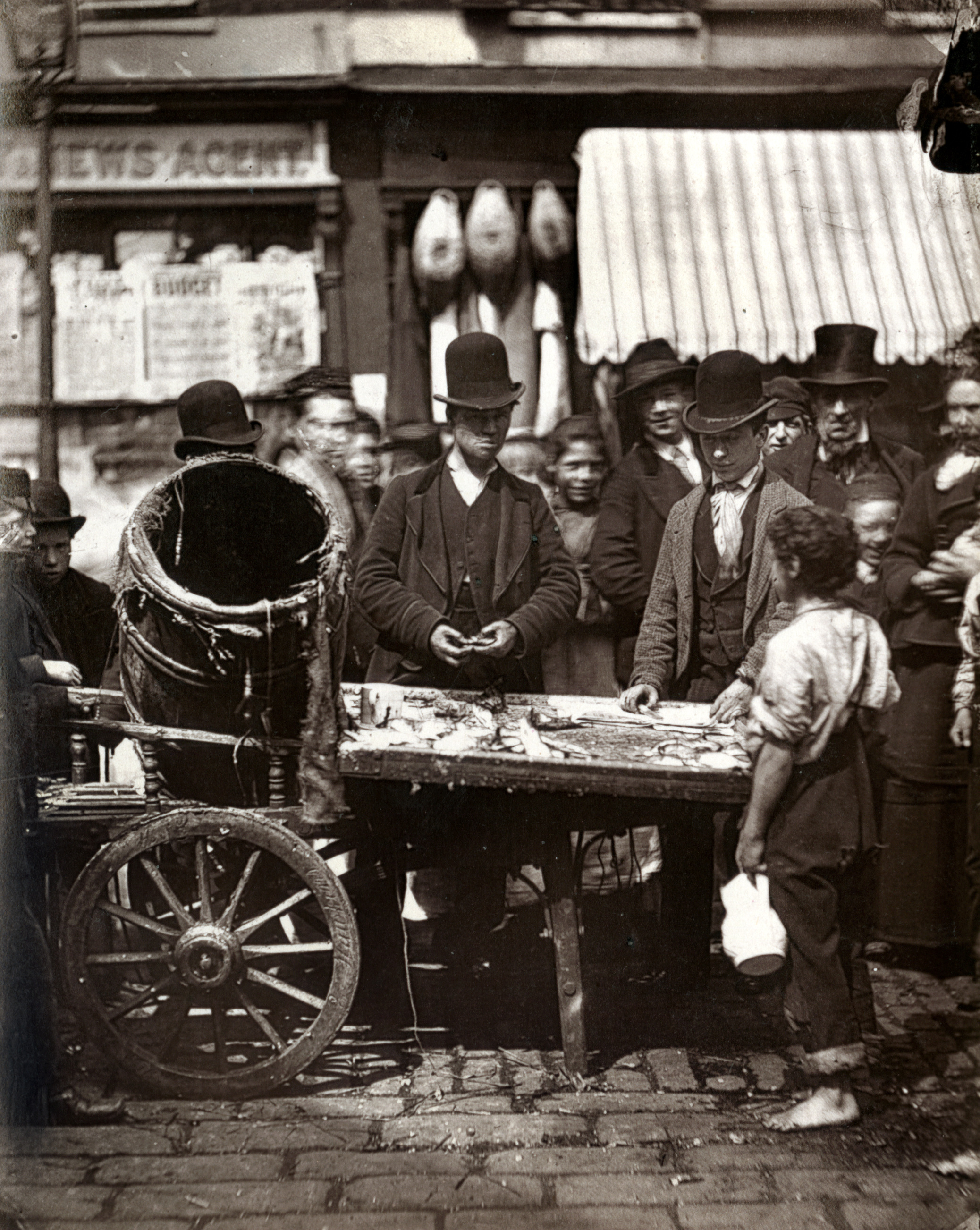
Fishmonger on Earlham Street Market circa 1877

Section six of the Metropolitan Streets Act 1867 (30 & 31 Vict. c. 134) effectively prohibited street trading:

No goods or other articles shall be allowed to rest on any footway or other part of a street within the limits of this Act, or be otherwise allowed to cause obstruction or inconvenience to the passage of the public, for a longer time than may be absolutely necessary for loading or unloading such goods or other articles.

Following public meetings and press criticism, the act was amended within weeks. Section one of the Metropolitan Streets Act Amendment Act 1867 (31 & 32 Vict. c. 5) exempted traders:

The sixth section of the Metropolitan Streets Act, 1867, prohibiting the deposit of goods in the streets, shall not apply to costermongers, street hawkers, or itinerant traders, so long as they carry on their business in accordance with the regulations from time to time made by the Commissioner of Police, with the approval of the Secretary of State.

Whilst the legal threat to the livelihoods of traders had receded, street traders were now subject to regulation by the police. The police required that stalls were no more than 9 feet (2.7 m) wide 3 feet (0.9 m) deep and 4 feet (1.2 m) apart from each other. Where the police deemed a stall to be obstructing the public highway, they could be confiscated and traders would need to pay for the storage along with a fine.

=== London County Council’s survey ===
In 1893, the London County Council’s survey of London's markets listed 112 street markets. These markets comprised 5,292 stalls, 4,502 belonging to costermongers and the rest being maintained by shopkeepers.

=== Beginning of licensing ===
The London County Council (General Powers) Act 1927 (17 & 18 Geo. 5. c. xxii) replaced police regulation with a new licensing regime administered by metropolitan borough councils.

=== Current management of markets ===
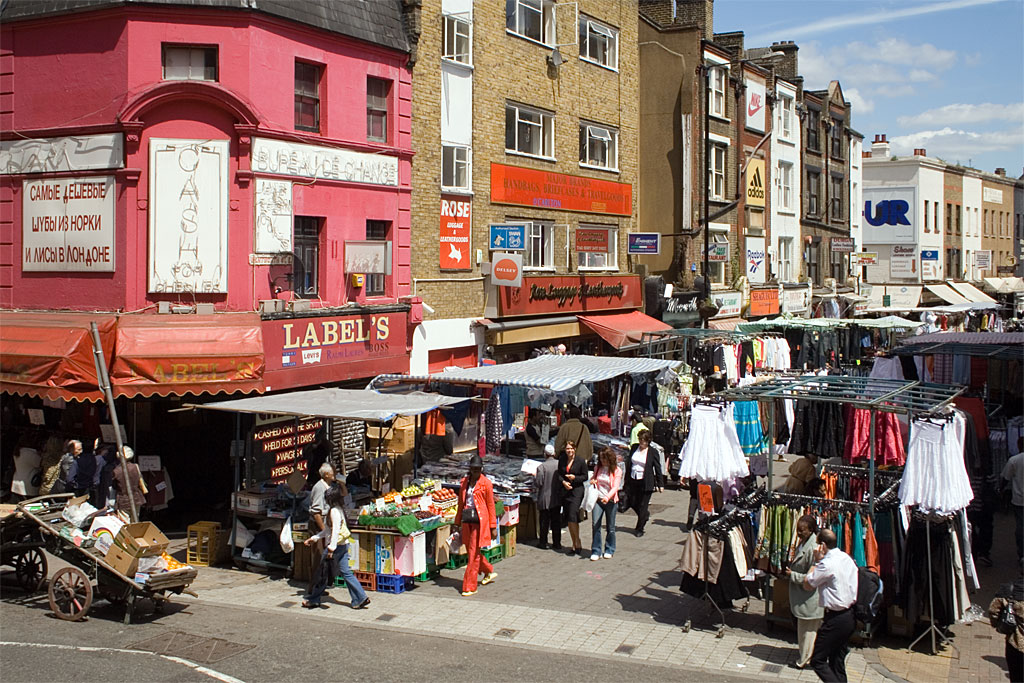
Petticoat Lane Market in 2006

Despite reorganisations of London's local government and changes to the underlying legislation, the licensing regime has continued. As of 2020, street trading in London is regulated under the London Local Authorities Act 1990 (c. vii) (as amended) and part III of the Food Act 1984 (c. 30), depending on the local authority. Whilst the London Local Authorities Act 1990 allows the regulation of street trading on private roads and areas open to the public within 7 metres of any road or footway, most local authorities only regulate street trading on the public highway.

In 2014 there were 43 street markets in central London (Camden, Islington, Kensington and Chelsea, Lambeth, Southwark, Tower Hamlets, and Wandsworth).

In the early 21st century, the City of London has taken a much more circumscribed interpretation of its market rights, limiting itself to wholesale markets. This has allowed a proliferation of farmers, niche, and street-food markets on private land in central London. There were 27 private markets in central London in 2014.

==== Independent management of street markets ====
Whilst most street markets are managed by local authorities, some are managed by volunteers or private companies:

- Lower Marsh has been managed by a local business improvement district, WeAreWaterloo since 2012,
- Venn Street is run by a community group, and
- Swiss Cottage Wednesday farmers market has been managed by London Farmers’ Markets since 1999.

A number of other markets have been relaunched, and run, by volunteers before been taken back into local authority management:

- Broadway Market was relaunched by the Broadway Market Traders and Residents Association in 2004 though management has now reverted to Hackney Council,
- between 2010 and 2018 Chatsworth Market was managed by Chatsworth Road Resident and Traders Association, and
- from 2013 to 2015 Queen's Crescent was run by the Queen's Crescent Community Association.
