= London Buses route 24 =

London bus route

24
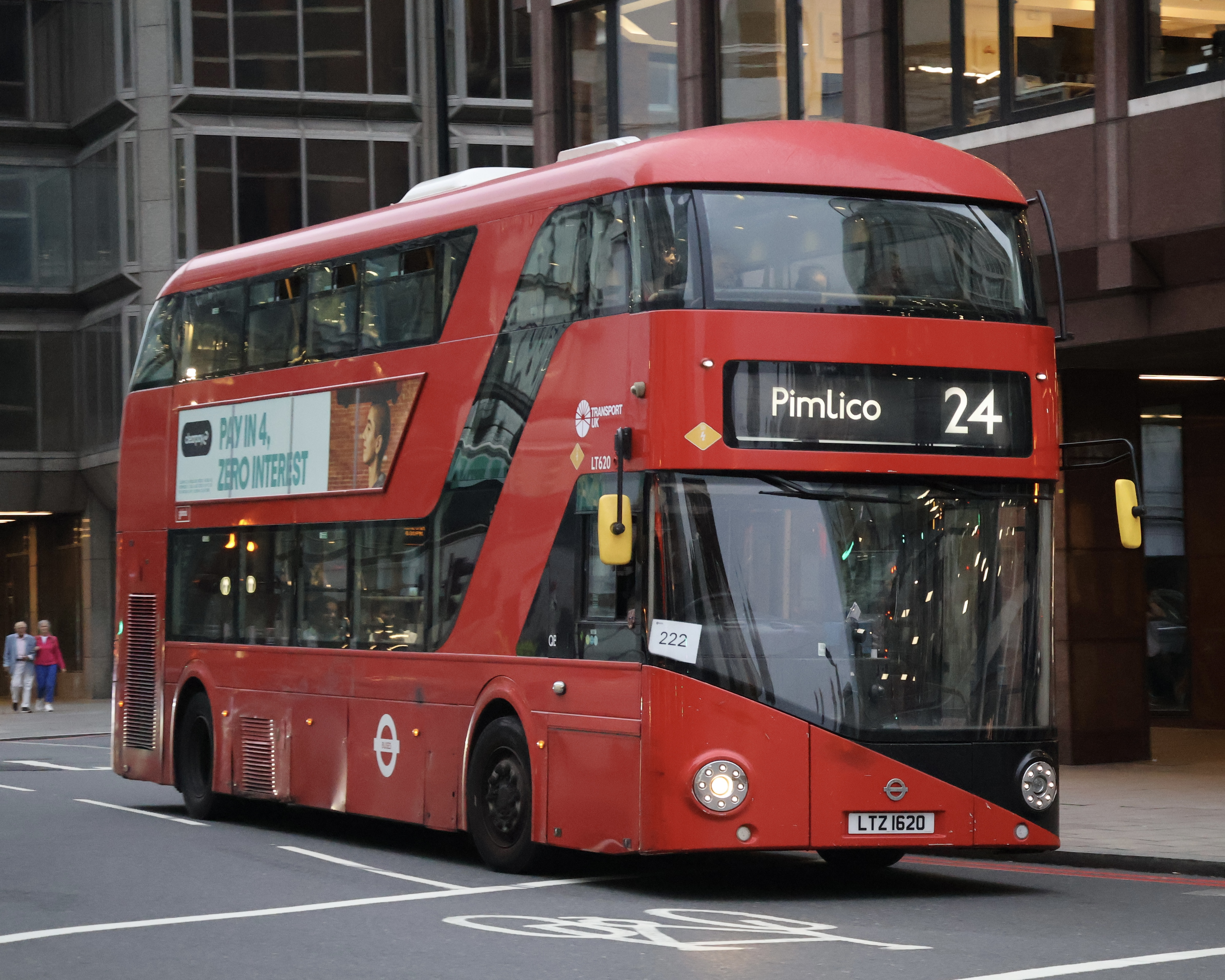
- Transport UK London Bus New Routemaster in Victoria in June 2025

Overview
- Operator: Transport UK London Bus
- Garage: Battersea
- Vehicle: New Routemaster
- Peak vehicle requirement: Day: 16; Night: 5
- Night-time: 24-hour service

Route
- Start: Hampstead Heath
- Via: Camden Town; Trafalgar Square; Victoria
- End: Pimlico
- Length: 7 miles (11 km)

Service
- Level: 24-hour service
- Frequency: About every 6 minutes
- Journey time: 39-66 minutes
- Operates: 24-hour service

London Buses route 24 is a Transport for London contracted bus route in London, England. Running between Hampstead Heath and Pimlico, it is operated by Transport UK London Bus.

== History ==
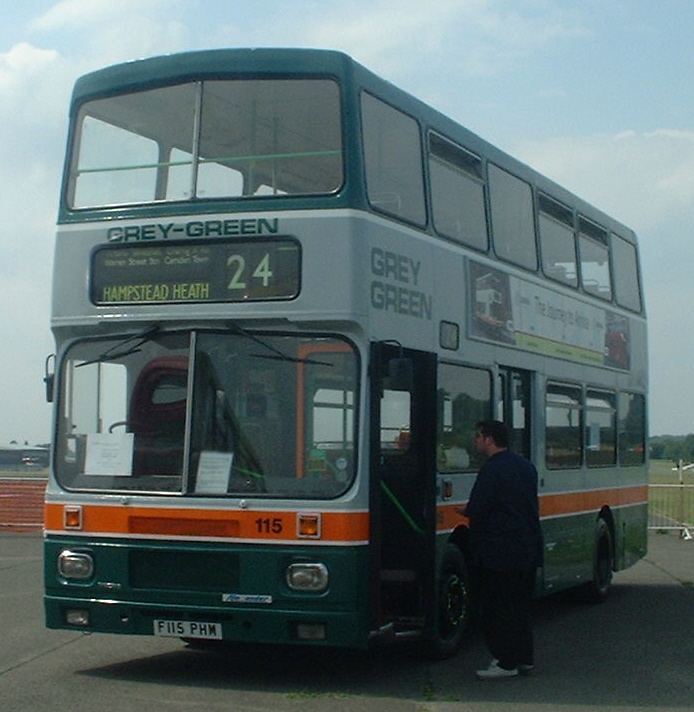
Preserved Grey-Green Alexander bodied Volvo Citybus as used on route 24 from 1988

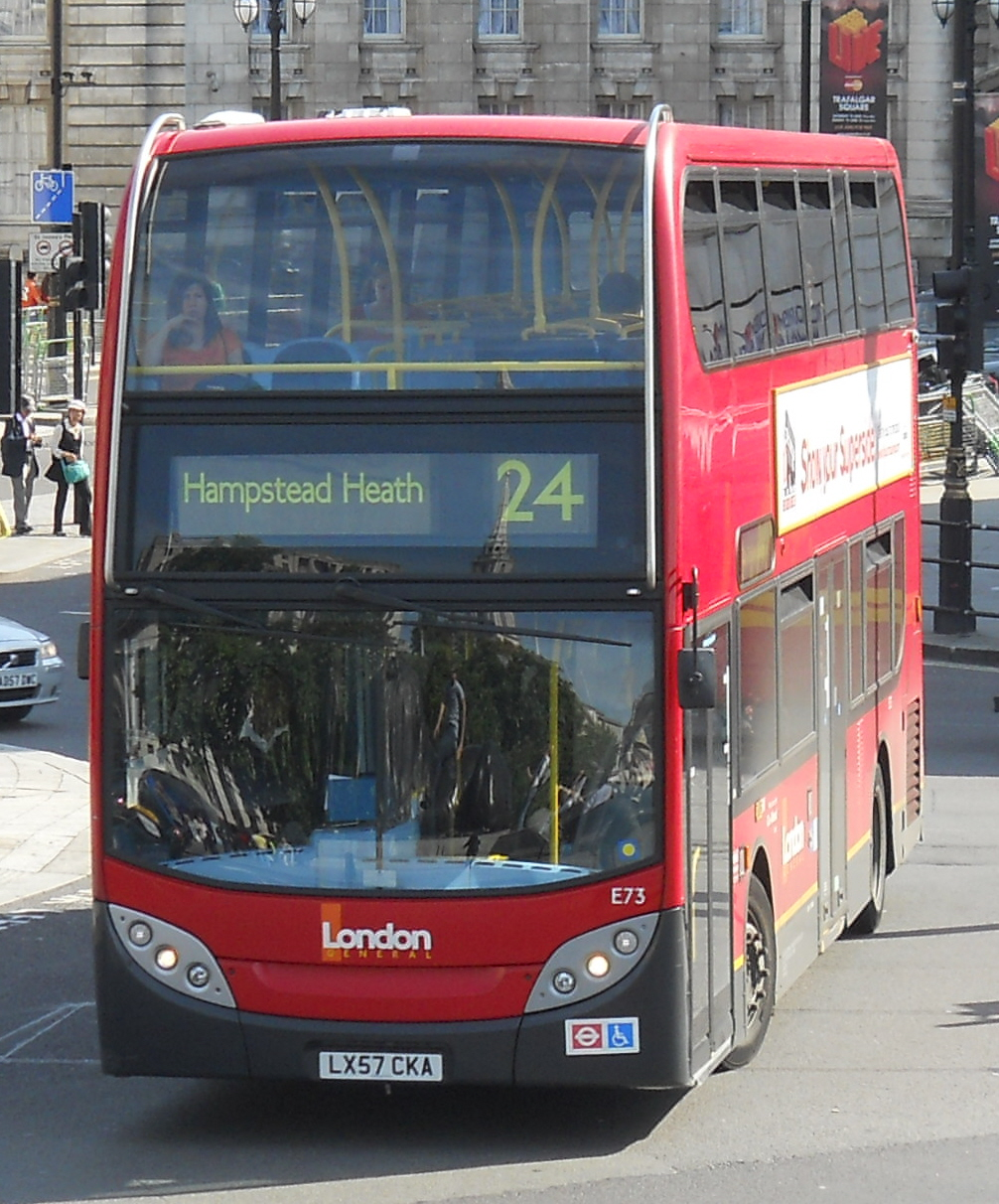
London General Alexander Dennis Enviro400 at Trafalgar Square in June 2011

Route 24 dates back to 1910, when it ran between Hampstead Heath and Victoria station. In August 1912 it was extended to Pimlico and has continued in that form until the present day, making this the oldest unchanged bus route in London. Thirty-three Daimler double-decker buses with 34 seats were allocated to route 24, now running between Pimlico and Hampstead, with the fleet name "British" painted in green livery. These buses were running from Camden Town (AQ) garage until they were replaced by AEC NS-Type buses in 1927. Thirty-three NS-type buses were used on route 24 until 1934.

Originally, the route was operated by the London General Omnibus Company, and later the British Automobile Traction Co until September 1933, when the London Passenger Transport Board, later London Transport Executive, was formed and ran under the name "London Transport".

During its life with London Transport, route 24 was operated mainly from Chalk Farm (CF) garage in Harmood Street. It was also run at times from Victoria (Gillingham Street; GM) garage.

On 7 November 1965, the first 30 Leyland Atlantean buses entered service on route 24. It was the first route to use front-entrance double-decker buses in London. Routes 67 and 271 also trialled front-entrance buses. On 12 June 1966, the Atlanteans moved to Tottenham garage and were replaced by AEC Routemasters. The route was crew operated until 25 October 1986, apart from two short periods in 1965/1966 and 1975.

The route was the first central London route to be awarded under the tendering process to a private company, Grey-Green, on 5 November 1988, using Alexander bodied Volvo Citybuses painted in its own grey, green and orange livery from its Stamford Hill garage. Grey-Green were owned by Cowie Group, and became part of Arriva London following the company's acquisition of two other London operators.

Upon being re-tendered, in November 2002 the route passed to Metroline's Holloway garage, and in 2006 was the first London bus route to be operated by Alexander Dennis Enviro400s. Upon re-tendering, on 10 November 2007 it passed to London General's Stockwell garage. Alexander Dennis Enviro400H hybrids were introduced to the route in early 2009.

On 11 February 2008, a bus on diversion had its roof ripped off after the driver drove into the side rather than under the middle of an arch bridge. Transport for London said the diversion was safe if drivers followed instructions, and had been operating successfully for over 24 hours. This came three months after another route 24 bus lost its roof at the same place while out of service.

A night element to the route was introduced on 27 November 1999, in the form of route N24, to replace part of the withdrawn route N2 between Hampstead Heath and Pimlico. The N prefix was dropped during April 2004, thus making it a 24-hour route.

In February 2010 it was reported that a Muslim bus driver, new to the country, pulled his 24 bus over near Gospel Oak, locked the passengers in and prayed to Mecca. The Sun newspaper had to pay out £30,000 after allegedly misrepresenting the incidents, stating that the driver was a fanatic who had forced passengers off the bus.

Metroline was awarded the contract for route 24 which started on 10 November 2012.

New Routemasters were introduced on 22 June 2013. The rear platform remained open until customer assistants were removed in 2016.

Abellio London was awarded the contract for route 24 when it was re-tendered effective 9 November 2019 from its Battersea garage.

In March 2022, the route was digitally recreated and released as an addon for the bus driving simulating game, OMSI 2.

On 4 September 2025, seventeen people were injured, with fifteen requiring hospital treatment, after a route 24 bus mounted the pavement near Victoria station in central London.

== Current route ==
Route 24 operates via these primary locations:

- Hampstead Heath South End Green
- Kentish Town Queen Crescent
- Chalk Farm Road
- Camden Town station
- Mornington Crescent station
- Somers Town Silverdale
- University College Hospital Gower Street
- Bloomsbury Torrington Place
- St Giles Great Russell Street
- Tottenham Court Road station
- Soho Denmark Street
- Cambridge Circus
- Leicester Square station
- Trafalgar Square for Charing Cross station
- Whitehall
- Westminster station
- St James's Park station
- Westminster City Hall
- Victoria station
- Pimlico Belgrave Road
- St George's Square
- Pimlico Grosvenor Road
