= Street trading licence =

A street trading licence (England and Wales), known as a street trader's licence in Scotland, is a legal requirement to vend goods and services on the streets of the UK.

== History ==
In England and Wales, street trading is governed by the Local Government (Miscellaneous Provisions) Act 1982. In Northern Ireland, street trading is regulated by the Street Trading Act (NI) 2001.

== Legal requirement ==
Whether self-employed or an employee, a street trading licence is required to pursue the act of street trading in a public place from a kiosk, vehicle, or moveable stall.

To acquire one you can be 17 or older. Street trading may not allowed during the early hours of the morning.

=== Exemptions ===
There are exemptions for selling:

- Milk
- Coal, or any solid fuel
- Public charitable collections, as regulated by section 119 of the Civic Government (Scotland) Act 1982

Market traders do not pay for street trading licences at licensed market venues.

=== Prohibitions ===
There are roads, listed by each district council, that you cannot sell from.

== Applications ==
A street trading licence can cost around £150 to £500 for a year. Acquiring the licence can take several weeks from each district council, where it is decided by a Licensing Committee.

If the individual making the application has not lived in the UK for at least 10 years, then they need a Certificate of Good Conduct or Criminal Record Certificate from their country of origin.

== See also ==
- Street food
- Street fundraising
