= List of markets in London =

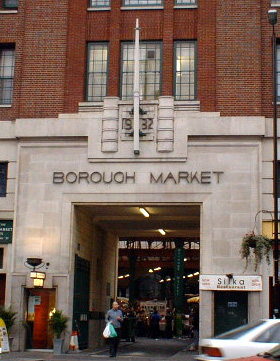
Borough Market

This is a list of markets in London. Greater London is home to a wealth of covered, outdoor and street markets. Many specialise in a particular type of goods or sell different things on different days. Most open very early in the morning and close early or late afternoon.

Markets in London have their origins in the Middle Ages and ancient charter; set up to serve the population of the City of London. Over time, some emerged as wholesale markets serving specific market segments — such as the sale of vegetables, meat, or fish. With an expanding metropolis in the 18th and 19th centuries, street markets were set up to meet the needs of the new suburbs. With the introduction of trams on the streets of London, these were moved (sometimes forcibly) into neighbouring side streets, or new covered markets.

The modern markets are regulated by the City and 32 London boroughs. Many have become 'general markets' proffering a range of goods.

== Wholesale markets ==
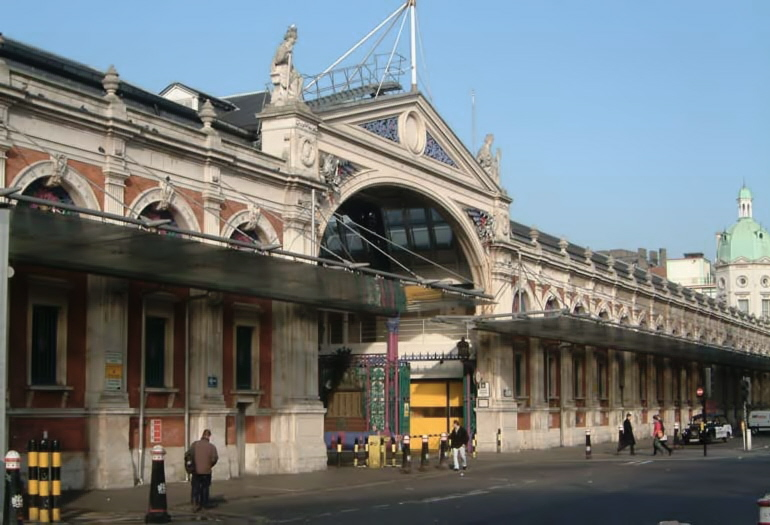
Smithfield Market is the main meat wholesale market for London.

These markets have ancient origins and connections with the City of London. Some have moved from their original locations within the city boundaries but most continue to be operated by the City of London Corporation:

- New Covent Garden Market is the largest fruit, vegetable and flower market in the UK. With over 200 businesses, employing over 2,500 people, the Market supplies 40% of the fresh fruit & vegetables eaten outside of the home in London and is used by 75% of London florists. With a large range of food businesses, including traditional wholesalers, wholesale distributors and food processors, NCGM serves many of London's best restaurants and hotels, cafés and bars, schools, hospitals and work places as well as independent retailers and street markets.
- Borough Market is located in The Borough, just south of London Bridge. The market was established on London Bridge and is first recorded in 1014. It has been in several locations, but moved to its present site in 1870. It was owned by the City Corporation and was transferred to an independent trust in 1999. It still operates as a wholesale market, but when this closes it sells a wide range of sundry food items.
- Old Billingsgate Market, a fish market, relocated in 1982 to Billingsgate Market, Poplar. The original elegant building facing the river is now used as a hospitality and events venue.
- Leadenhall Market, a food-centred market, continues to operate with many of the market spaces converted to retail outlets.
- Smithfield Market is a meat market that was originally a live cattle market.
- Spitalfields Market, a food market which relocated in 1991 to New Spitalfields Market, Leyton. The original market site is still used as a market selling fashion, art and design, food and vintage goods and is part of a revival of the surrounding area.

== Notable markets ==
These are other wholesale markets and those popular with tourists, mainly in Central London:

- Bermondsey Market is located on Tower Bridge Road in Bermondsey, South London, and deals primarily with antiques, originally sold under the rules of market overt. Hours: 4am - 12 noon Friday.
- Brick Lane Market, at the northern end of Brick Lane and along Cheshire Street in East London. The market developed in the 17th century for fruit and vegetables. With the arrival of Jewish immigrants, it began to operate on Sundays. Today, it sells food and general bric-a-brac, on Sundays.
- Broadway Market, Hackney, modern revival of ancient market (Saturdays).
- Brook Green Market and Kitchen, based at Addison Primary School in Brook Green, Kensington and Olympia, the market founded in 2014 is like a traditional Farmers Market but with certain innovative additions including Interactive Cookery Masterclasses, Live Music and craft alcohols.
- Camden Lock Market and several others comprise a complex often referred to simply as "Camden Market". Camden Lock Market is close to Camden Town Tube station, and gets its name from its location at Camden Lock on Regent's Canal in Camden Town, northwest London. All the markets sell general goods, music, collectables, military-surplus, jewellery, incense, clothing and a wide variety of fast-food.
- Camden Passage Market, on Islington High Street and Camden Passage, has its origins in the 1960s when small shop and stall holders banded together to form the market. Two markets deal in antiques and collectables. Wednesdays and Saturdays are good to visit for the antiques, Thursday is the book market, more recently fashion/accessories stalls come on Fridays and mixed craft/fashion/antiques on Sundays.
- Columbia Road market originated in the 19th century. It became a flower market to sell produce on Sunday - left over from nearby Spitalfields. It is in Bethnal Green in East London. Hours: 9am - 12noon Sunday.
- Inverness Street Market, near Camden Town Tube station, was for over 100 years a traditional street market, with stalls selling fruit and vegetables. The last food stall closed in 2013, and it is now similar to the other Camden markets there.
- Leather Lane Market, located in Holborn, central London. Sells clothing, fruit, vegetables, general goods, and street food. Used mainly by office workers during lunchtime.
- Covent Garden Market located in the West End, was originally a flower market, now relocated to New Covent Garden Market, Vauxhall in south London. The original building is now a shopping and tourist area with some shops, and there is an indoor market containing stalls selling jewellery, speciality soaps, tourist souvenirs, etc.
- Greenwich Market, located in Greenwich, southeast London, deals in antiques, arts, and crafts.
- Jubilee Market at The Piazza, Covent Garden, is at the Jubilee Hall, which houses the market, and has a wide variety of arts and crafts stalls, jewellery and clothing, antiques and general market items.
- Petticoat Lane Market is located on Wentworth Street and Middlesex Street in east London, and sells clothing, luggage and a wide range of cheap consumer items.
- Piccadilly Market was established in 1981 and operates six days a week in the courtyard of St James's Church, Piccadilly.
- Portobello Road Market sells antiques, fruit and vegetables, and general goods, and is located in the Notting Hill area of West London. Hours: Primarily Saturday, with lower levels of activity on Friday and Sunday, and a few stalls throughout the week.
- Old Spitalfields Market is located on Commercial Street in east London. In 2005, a regeneration programme saw the creation of Spitalfields Market, located in 56 Brushfield Street, a connected market on the western end of the site which includes the new public areas of Crisping Place and Bishops Square. The two Spitalfields Markets are one of London's busiest areas on Saturdays and Sundays with hundreds of market stalls specialising in fashion, art, crafts, design and food. The Markets are located in the original, historic Victorian Market Hall built in 1887.
- Islington Farmers' Market was the first Farmers' Market in London. Having had a number of different locations since it first opened, it is now held every Sunday at the Penton Street end of Chapel Market, N1, close to Angel tube station.

== Other markets ==
These markets tend to be less visited by tourists but are used regularly by local residents. Some are of a comparable size to the more renowned markets:

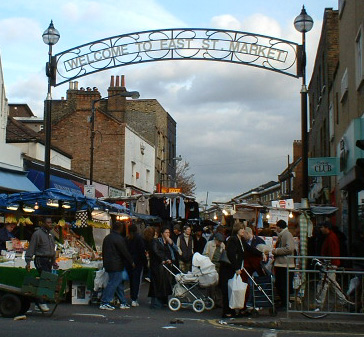
East Street Market

- Archway market, which sells general goods on Thursdays and goods and food on Saturdays, is located near Archway Station.
- Balham Farmers' Market, a FARMA-certified farmers' market run by London Farmers' Markets
- Barking Market, Takes place Tuesday, Thursday, Friday, Saturday on East Street.
- Battersea High Street market, which sells food and general goods, is located in Battersea.
- Bermondsey Square Farmers' Market
- Berwick Street Market is a small general goods market in the heart of Soho, central London.
- Blackheath Farmers' Market, a FARMA-certified farmers' market run by London Farmers' Market.
- Bloomsbury Farmers' Market, a FARMA-certified farmers' market run by London Farmers' Market.
- The Blue is the central Bermondsey market selling food and clothes.
- Brixton Arts & Craft Market, first Sunday of the month, with a focus on artists and designer/makers, located in Brixton, south London.
- Brixton Market, which sells food, is located in Brixton, south London.
- Brixton Farmers' Market a FARMA-certified farmers' market run by London Farmers' Markets
- Broadgate Market run by Shepherds Markets in Finsbury Avenue Square, Broadgate
- Brockley Market, Saturday market in London, SE4, offering locally sourced fresh fruit and vegetables, meat, fish and poultry, plants and flowers.
- Camden Passage Sunday Market
- Chalton Street Market, a general goods market, is located in Camden, north London.
- Chapel Market, a food and general goods market, is located in Islington, north London.
- Chatsworth Road Market, a small boutique food and general goods market, is located in Homerton, east London.
- Chiswick Flower Market, a small upmarket flower market, held on Old Market Place, just off Chiswick High Road, in Chiswick, west London, on the first Sunday of each month
- Chrisp Street Market, a general goods market, is located in Poplar, east London.
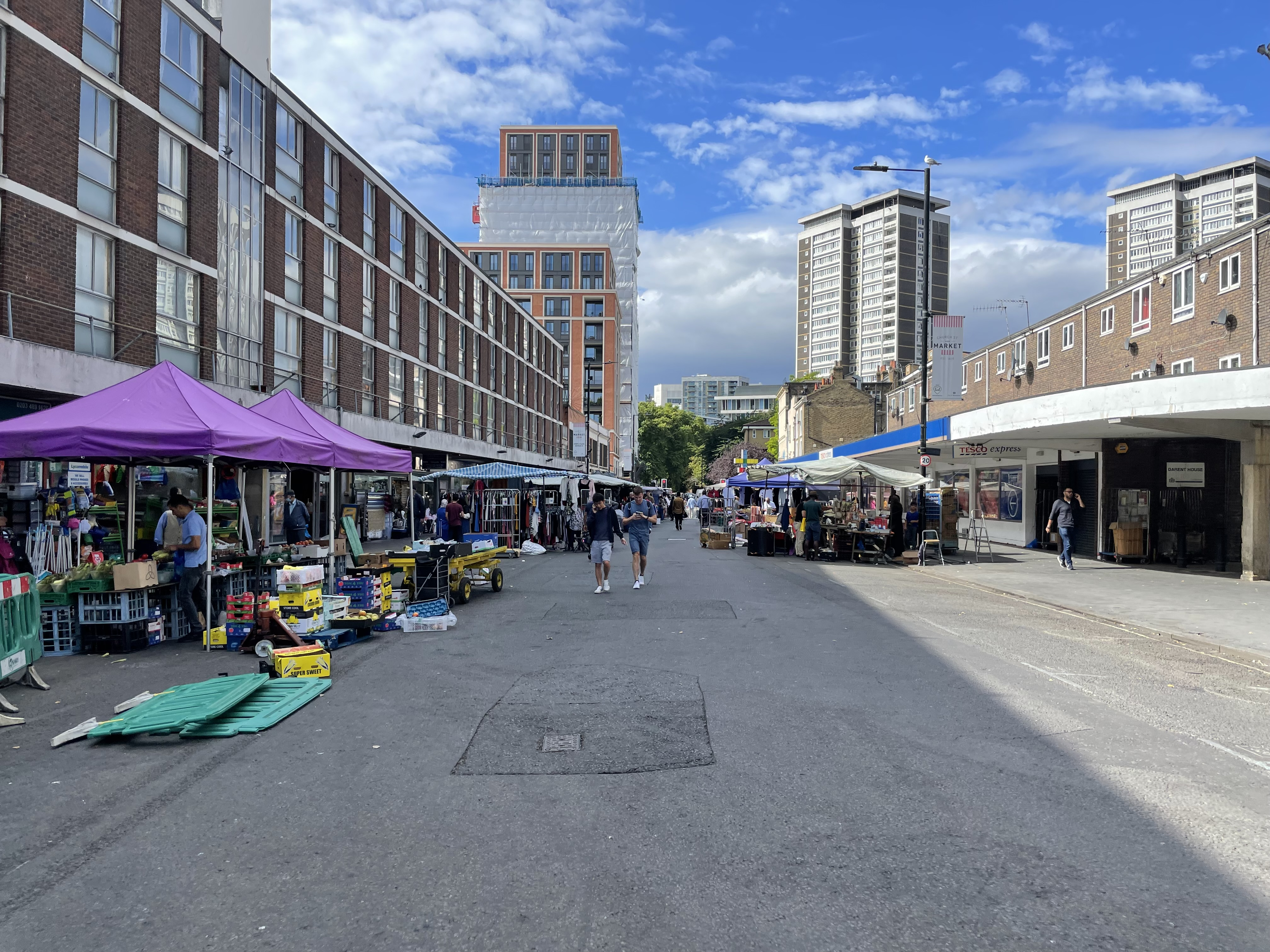
- Church Street Market.
  Church Street Market, a general goods market of over 200 stalls operating Monday to Saturday, is located off the Edgware Road.
- Crystal Palace Food Market, supplies a good range of sustainably farmed produce and locally produced hot food, cakes and deli items.
- Deptford Market, which deals in food and antiques, is located in Deptford, southeast London
- Ealing Farmers' Market a FARMA-certified farmers' market run by London Farmers' Market.
- Earlham Street Market, selling T-shirts, clothing, and food products, near Seven Dials in central London.
- East Ham Market Hall is a covered market in East Ham, off High Street North.
- East Street Market, a market that sells food and sundry goods, is located in Walworth, south London.
- Enfield Town Market has been running since the medieval period. It is located in the market square in the centre of Enfield Town.
- Exmouth Market, located in Clerkenwell in east-central London, sells food and crafts on Fridays and Saturdays. It is one of London's newest markets
- Goldborne Road is a side street off the north end of Portobello Road market (above) with stalls selling bric-a-brac, vegetables, and household goods.
- Goodge Place Market, in central London, is a small 5–6 stall market catering mainly for office workers during lunchtime
- Hampstead Artisan Market - An eclectic mix of arts, crafts, jewellery, clothes and handcrafted wares.
- Hay's Galleria Market is a small market established in 1987 with its own resident artist, selling jewellery, souvenirs, tourist apparel and art.
- Herne Hill Market is a vibrant Sunday market packed with stalls selling locally produced food, arts and crafts.
- Hildreth Street market is a food and general goods market, located in Balham, south London.
- Kingston upon Thames in southwest London has two markets. Kingston Market is open from Monday to Saturday and sells food and consumer items while the weekly Monday Market sells clothes and household items.
- Kentish Town Car Boot, located in Gospel Oak Primary School, near Hampstead. It is notable for winning three best car boot awards in 2023 and sells vintage recycled goods, serving the local community, open every Sunday all year.
- KERB, located between King's Cross station and Central St. Martins, it is a street food market that runs Tuesday to Friday.
- Lewisham market, located in Lewisham High Street, southeast London, sells fruit, vegetables and general goods
- Lower Marsh Market has stalls selling food from around the world, crafts and other goods, and is located adjacent to Waterloo station, central London
- Maltby Street Market is a weekend street food market in Bermondsey.
- Marylebone farmers' market is a FARMA-certified farmers' market run by London Farmers' Markets
- Merton Abbey Mills is an arts and crafts market which runs every weekend with over 100 market stalls selling jewellery, clothing, art, toys and gifts. It is located on the A24 Merantun Way near Colliers Wood tube station
- Myddleton Road Market is a community food and crafts market running on the first Sunday of each month. Closest transport is Bowes Park railway station and Bounds Green tube station
- Nine Elms Sunday Market, a market that sells sundry goods in Vauxhall, with over 1000 stalls
- North End Road Market, a market that sells fruit and vegetables, food and other sundry goods, is located in Fulham, southwest London.
- Notting Hill Farmers' Market is a certified farmers' market run by London Farmers' Markets
- Northcote Road market, located near Clapham Junction, Battersea, south London, sells food and general goods.
- Northcote Road Antiques Market, located a few doors away from Northcote Library near Clapham Junction, Battersea, south London, has 30 antiques dealers in this indoor market in SW11.
- Old Spitalfields Designers/Makers Market, third Saturday every month - featuring UK Designers and craft practitioners.
- Spitalfields Market Arts Market, every last weekend of the month - featuring ‘up and coming’ and established artists, offering a diverse mix of affordable art
- Spitalfields Market Saturday Style Market, every Saturday, independent designers selling original clothing, accessories, homewares and ethical goods
- Parliament Hill Farmers' Market is a FARMA-certified farmers' market run by London Farmers' Markets
- Parson's Green Farmers' Market, a FARMA-certified farmers' market run by London Farmers' Market
- Partridges Food Market. Held in the Duke of York Square every Saturday, with a variety of produce stalls and local and international stalls
- Pimlico Road Farmers' Market is a FARMA-certified farmers' market run by London Farmers' Markets
- Plender Street Market, a general goods market in the Camden Town area of northwest London
- Queen Mary (Mile End) Farmers' Market, a FARMA-certified farmers' market run by London Farmers' Market
- Queen's Crescent Market, Gospel Oak, north London, Thursdays and Saturdays. Sells cheap electrical items, foods, and clothes
- Queen's Park Farmers' Market is a FARMA-certified farmers' market run by London Farmers' Markets
- Queens Road Market located on Green Street, in Upton Park, east London, is a large market selling a variety of foods from all over the world, particularly the Indian sub-continent
- Rathbone Market located in Canning Town, east London, is a small Thursday morning market selling textiles and bric-à-brac.
- Ridley Road Market is located in Dalston, northeast London, and sells hot and cold food, fresh fruit and vegetables, clothing, fashion and accessories, electronics, homeware and general goods
- Roman Road Market, located in Old Ford, East London is open Monday to Saturday and is known colloquially as 'The Roman'.
- Romford Market is located in Romford, east London, selling food and general goods
- Rosewood London Slow Food & Living Market, Holborn
- Royal Arsenal Farmers' Market
- Seven Sisters Market is a market in South Tottenham where over half the traders are from Latin America
- South Kensington Farmers' Market is a FARMA-certified farmers' market run by London Farmers' Markets
- Swiss Cottage Farmers' Market is a FARMA-certified farmers' market run by London Farmers' Markets
- Sclater Street Stalls is a fortnightly food, art, vintage and handicraft market, located in East London near Shoreditch High Street railway station.
- St John's Wood Farmers' Market is a FARMA-certified farmers' market run by London Farmers' Markets
- Shepherd's Bush Market sells food and assorted goods, and is located in Shepherd's Bush, west London
- Real Food Market at Southbank is located behind the Royal Festival Hall.
- Strutton Ground Market is located off Victoria Street, SW1, central London.
- Surrey Street Market has a Royal Charter dating back to 1276 linking it to the Archbishop of Canterbury. It sells vegetables, meat and a range of other items throughout the week. Located in Croydon, south London.
- Tottenham Green Market located opposite Tottenham Town Hall
- Tooting/Broadway Markets in Tooting, south London, in combination, are two indoor daily markets with stalls and shops selling street food, clothes, gifts, bric-a-brac, oddities, groceries and a variety of household goods. In the evening the stalls close and a large selection of small restaurants and bars with a buzzing night life take over, part of the reason Tooting was voted one of the 10 coolest places on earth by Lonely Planet.
- Twickenham Farmers' Market is a FARMA-certified farmers' market run by London Farmers' Markets
- Sunday UpMarket is located on Brick Lane within the historic Old Truman Brewery complex in east London near Spitalfields. This is a newer market focusing on products created by young designers and unusual international foods
- Swiss Cottage Market, a street food market in Swiss Cottage, North London that hosts a weekly FARMA-certified farmers' market run by London Farmers' Markets
- Walthamstow Market is located in Walthamstow, east London. It is the longest market in Europe, and sells food, clothing, and assorted goods
- Walthamstow Farmers' Market is a FARMA-certified farmers' market run by London Farmers' Markets
- The Waste is a market held every Saturday morning along Kingsland Road, in Dalston, north east London.
- Wimbledon Farmers' Market is a FARMA-certified farmers' market run by London Farmers' Markets
- Well Street Market in Hackney, east London, sells fruit, fresh vegetables, clothing and general goods
- Wembley Market in Wembley, north London, sells a wide variety of goods including fruit, vegetables, luggage, fabric and clothes
- Whitechapel market in Tower Hamlets sells fruit, fresh vegetables, clothing and general goods. It is being further developed.
- Whitecross Street Market is located in Whitecross Street, off Old Street, EC1.
- Wimbledon - Monthly Market on the Piazza first weekend of every month March–November, predominantly artisan products. Food, homewares, art, crafts, clothing, jewellery, beauty and gifts.
- Woolwich Market, daily market (except Sundays) at Beresford Square in Woolwich, SE18

== Former markets ==
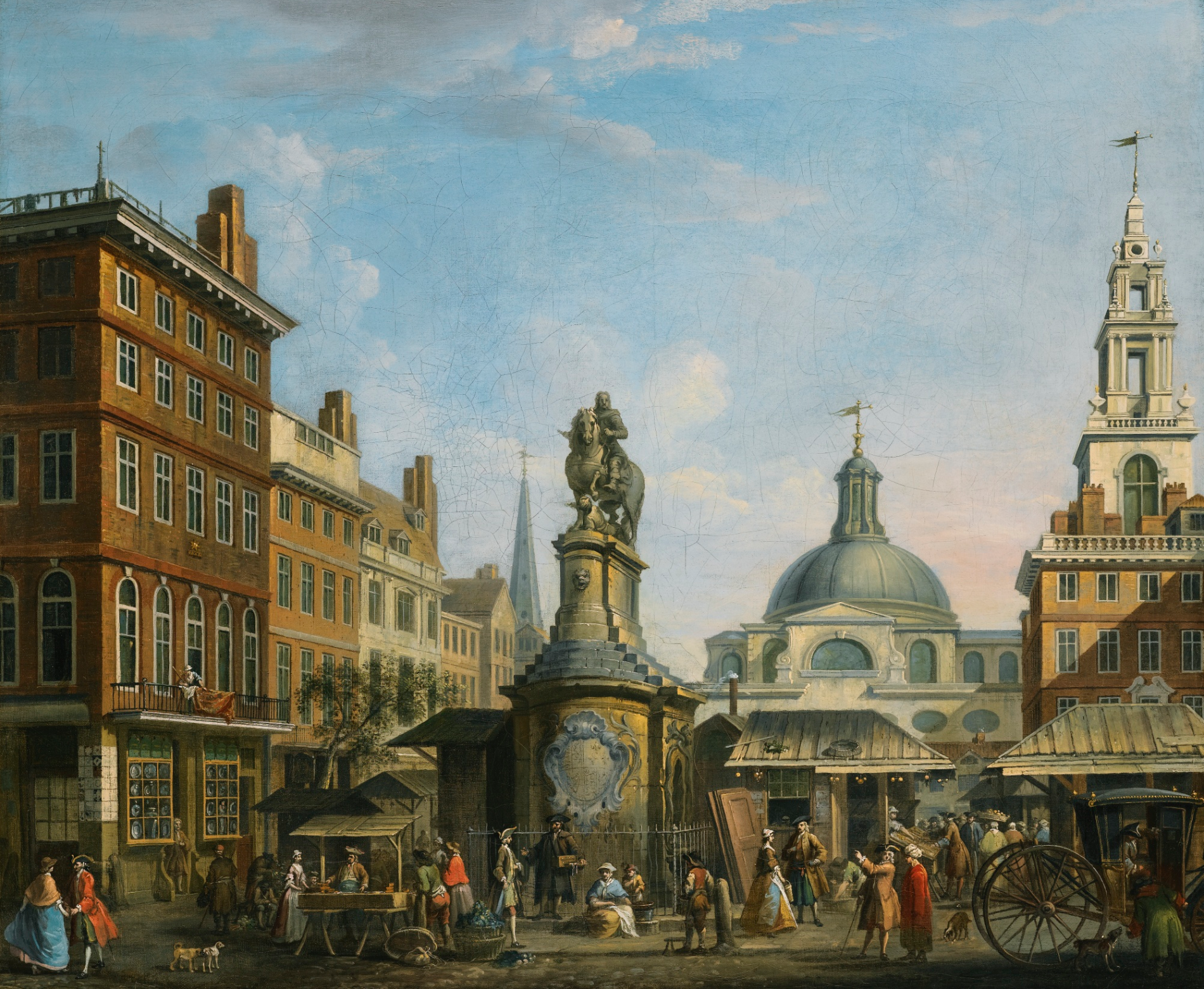
Painting of Stocks Market shortly before it closed in 1737

- Club Row animal market, north of Brick Lane in Bethnal Green, closed in 1983.
- Farringdon Market (1829–1880)
- Fleet Market (1736–1829)
- Foreign Cattle Market (1872-1913), where imported live cattle were sold
- Market Place, Finchley (late 17th century – 1973)
- Shepherd Market, Mayfair, an old marketplace that was developed as a square between in 1735 and 1746.
- Stocks Market (1282–1737), on the site of the Mansion House, was for centuries London's main retail meat and produce market.
