= Club Row =

Club Row may refer to:

- Park West (Miami)
- Part of 27th Street (Manhattan), in New York City
- a street in Bethnal Green, London, site of a former animal market until 1983
