= Jacob Raphael Building =

- U.S. National Register of Historic Places
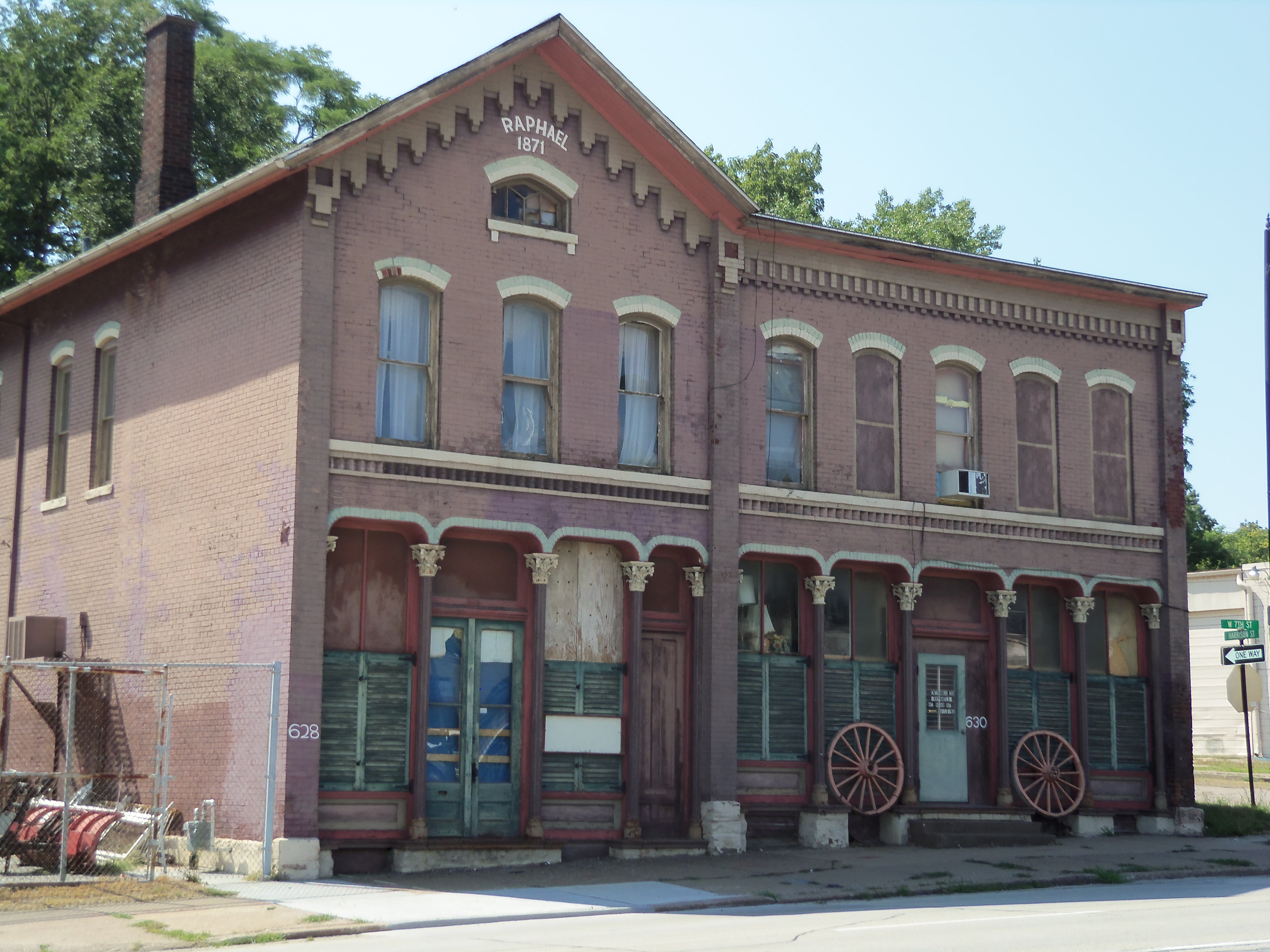

- Location within Iowa Location within the United States
- Location: 628-630 Harrison St. Davenport, Iowa
- Coordinates: 41°31′35″N 90°34′39″W
- Area: less than one acre
- Built: 1875
- MPS: Davenport MRA
- NRHP reference No.: 83002490
- Added to NRHP: July 7, 1983

The Jacob Raphael Building is a historic building located north of downtown Davenport, Iowa, United States. It was listed on the National Register of Historic Places in 1983. The two-story structure, consisting of a three-bay wide, gable-roofed structure and a five-bay wide “wing”, was completed in 1875. It contains commercial space on the first floor and residential space on the second floor. Noteworthy, is the ground-floor arcade that features fluted cast-iron columns with elaborate capitals. The columns vary in height to accommodate the sloping site.

The building originally housed Jacob Raphael's tin-shop, rag warehouse, rag and iron dealership, and junk dealership. The Raphael family, thought to be members of the local Jewish community, lived above the shop. It later housed M. Raphael & Sons., a cigar manufacturer. In the late 19th and early 20th centuries Davenport was the cigar capital of the Midwest, with 34 manufacturers who employed more than 1,000 people by 1910. German immigrants were primarily responsible for the industry, which got its start locally before the American Civil War. By 1945 there were only two manufacturers left, with the last one closing in 1961. This building is now the site of Raphael's Emporium, an antique store.
