= Guirlande Antwerpen =

Coordinates: 51°12′54.3″N 4°23′40.5″E

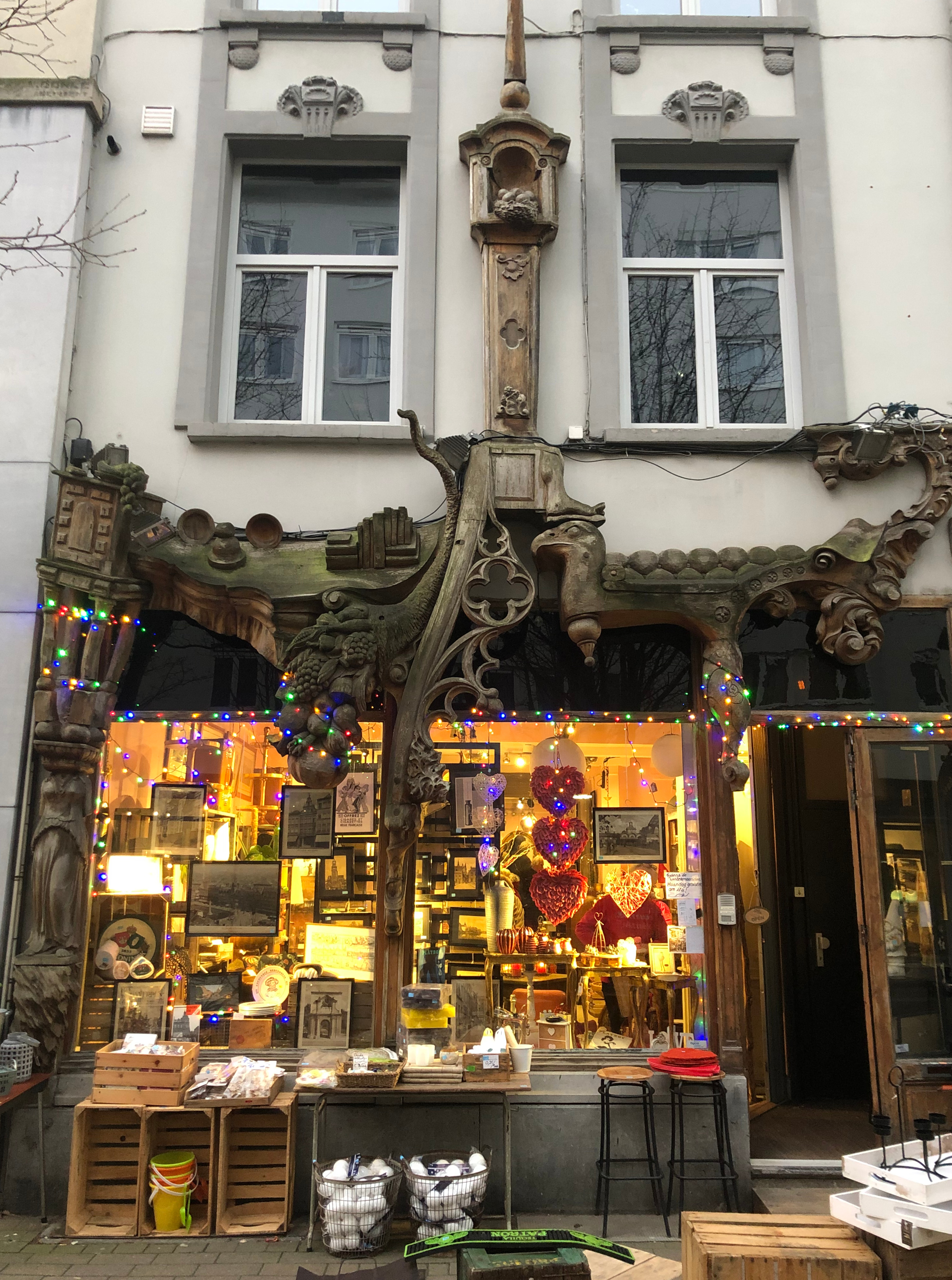
The façade of Kloosterstraat 81, featuring Guirlande Antwerpen

The Guirlande Antwerpen [ɡiʁ.lɑd] (Dutch for Garland of Antwerp) is a sculpture located on the storefront of an antique shop in Antwerp's antique district. It is at Kloosterstraat 81 in the St. Andries quarter.

== History ==
The sculpture was commissioned by Tony Bogaert, one of the first antique dealers of Kloosterstraat. The sculpture was designed and made by the visual artist Bruno de Smedt in 1997. The disorderly sculpture is a sprawling 5.6 metres wide and 7 metres tall (18 by 23 ft), and took de Smedt fully five months to carve.

The Guirlande is seen by many as a symbol of the district and Antwerp which is well known for antiques, art, trinkets and alternative designs. The artwork refers to typical elements for ornamentation and are harmoniously incorporated into an asymmetrical whole; include a cabinet, the cornucopia, an eagle and a Caryatid. The artist with his characteristic organic style shaped something that not only represents Antwerp, but also paid homage to the patron Tony Bogaert, an extravagant figure and mischievous and cunning businessman. A fool's cap and fox refer to this and are processed at the top of the façade sculpture.

== Material ==
It was created entirely from cedar wood due to its durability against wind and the elements. The wood of this coniferous tree has a high resin content extremely resistant to moisture fluctuations. Because the wood is untreated, it gets a satin finish and ages naturally to a silver surface.
