= Robert Kaufelt =

Robert Ian Kaufelt (born October 7, 1947) is an American specialty-food retailer and former owner of Murray's Cheese, a cheese shop in New York City. He purchased Murray's Cheese in 1991 and expanded the business, including educational programming,cheese aging caves, food service and additional locations. He later entered a partnership with Kroger in 2005. In 2017, Kroger acquired Murray's Cheese; Kaufelt remained affiliated with the company as a strategic adviser.

== Early life ==
Kaufelt was born in Highland Park, New Jersey, to a family involved in the grocery business. His paternal grandfather, Irving Kaufelt, was a Polish immigrant who opened Kaufelt Brothers Fancy Groceries in Perth Amboy, New Jersey, in 1920. His father, Stanley P. Kaufelt, owned Mayfair Supermarkets Inc., which operated a chain of 28 grocery stores under the Foodtown banner. In 1995, Stanley Kaufelt sold Mayfair Supermarkets to the Dutch supermarket company Ahold.

== Career ==
=== Early career ===
After graduating from Cornell University in 1969 with a BA in Government, Kaufelt joined Mayfair Supermarket Inc. and eventually became President. He left Mayfair in 1985 to open two specialty stores in Princeton and Summit, New Jersey, called Kaufelt's Fancy Groceries, named after the original family grocery in Perth Amboy. One of the stores closed in 1987; Kaufelt subsequently sold the Summit location and moved to Greenwich Village.

=== Murray's Cheese ===
In 1991, Murray's Cheese was going out of business when Kaufelt purchased the brand and moved it to the corner of Bleecker and Cornelia Street.

During the 1990s, Kaufelt worked in the store and expanded its retail and educational operations. During his tenure, Murray's Cheese expanded its retail footprint and distribution and developed a national wholesale and retail presence.

Murray's Cheese has been included in travel and lifestyle lists of notable cheese shops.

In addition to the flagship location on Bleecker Street in Greenwich Village, Kaufelt opened a branch in Grand Central Terminal in 2002 and the restaurant Murray's Cheese Bar in 2012.

==== Innovations ====
Kaufelt expanded the selection with an emphasis on American Farmstead cheeses. With the creation of Cheeses of All Nations, he imported foreign foods, and added temperature-controlled cheese-aging caves beneath the store. He also established educational programming, including classes and a multi-day training program.

Kaufelt developed the Murray's Certified Cheese Professional (CCP) program in partnership with the American Cheese Society. According to Edible Manhattan, the store served as an early training ground for a number of specialty-food businesses.

==== Kroger partnership ====
In 2005, Kaufelt entered a partnership with Ohio-based Kroger. By 2016, the partnership had expanded Murray's shop-in-shop locations to hundreds of Kroger stores nationwide.

In 2017, Kroger acquired Murray's Cheese, and Kaufelt remained affiliated with the company as a strategic adviser. There are now over 1100 Murray's Cheese Shops in Kroger locations across the US.

== Publications ==
- The Murray's Cheese Handbook (2006) Broadway Books
- "Who Moved My Arugula" for The New York Times
- "Fancy Grocery" for Gastronomica
- "My Life as the Big Cheese at Murrays" for The Forward
- Essay in Greenwich Village Stories: A Collection of Memoirs (2014)

== Awards ==
- Prud’Homme, La Guilde Internationale des Fromagers (2017)
- Garde et Jure, La Guilde Internationale des Fromagers (2004)

== Personal life ==
Kaufelt's first two marriages ended in divorce.

In 2010, Kaufelt married food writer Nina Planck. The couple have three children and live in New York City and Stockton, New Jersey.
