= Islington Farmers' Market =

Farmers' Market in London

Coordinates: 51°32′0.16″N 0°6′37.92″W

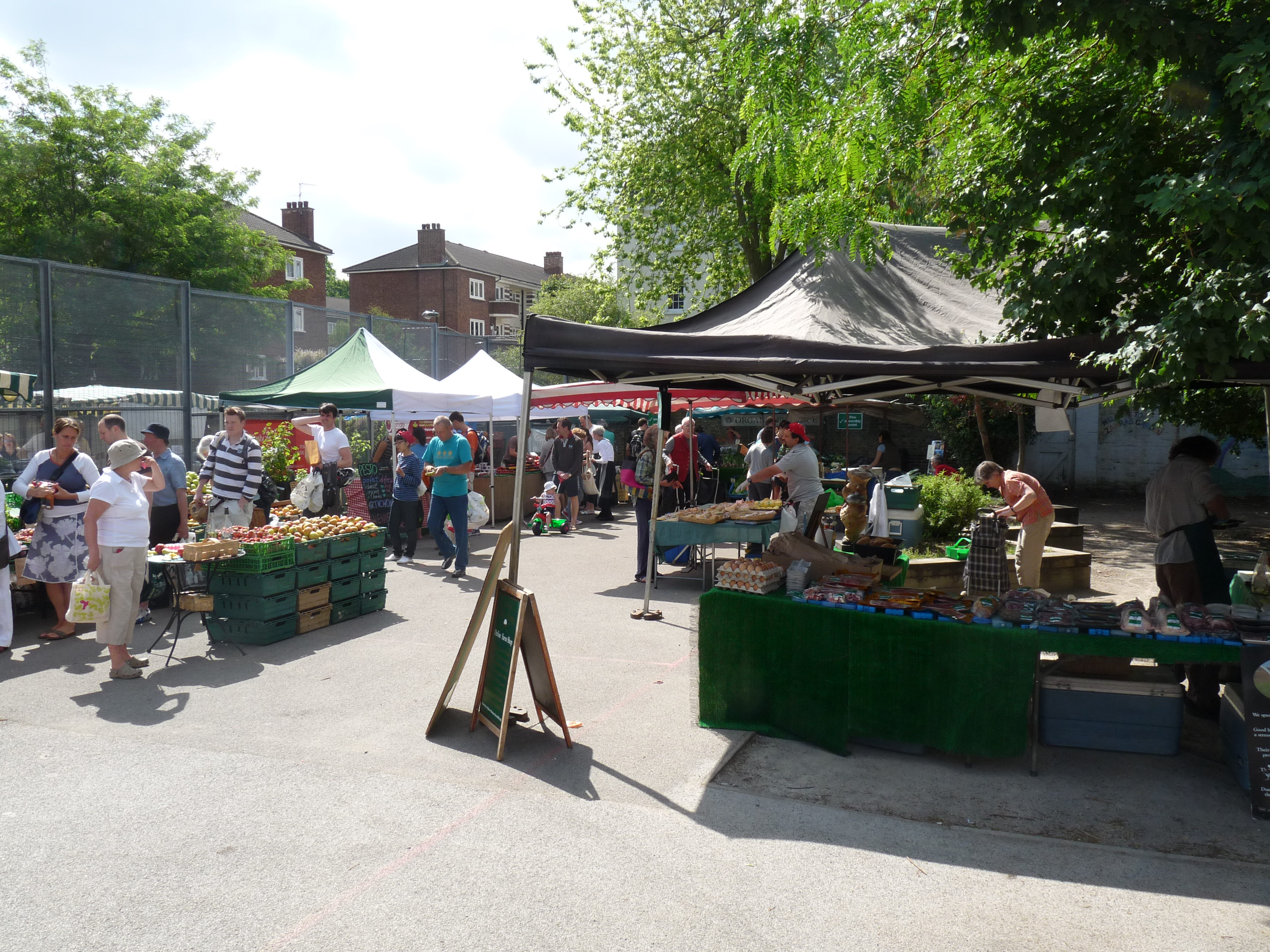
Islington Farmers' Market

Islington Farmers' Market was the first Farmers' Market to open in London, it opened in 1999. The market was set up by food writer Nina Planck, who established the organisation London Farmers' Markets. The market is still running, having changed location twice. It is currently held on the Western end of the historic market street, Chapel Market.

In 2010, the market was voted as London's best Farmers' Market by Time Out magazine.
