= Nina Planck =

American food writer

Nina Planck (born 1971) is a food writer and farmers' market entrepreneur.

== Biography ==
She was born in Buffalo, New York in 1971 and was brought up on an ecological vegetable farm in Loudoun County, Virginia. She wrote The Real Food Cookbook: Traditional Dishes for Modern Cooks, The Farmers' Market Cookbook, Real Food: What to Eat and Why, and Real Food for Mother and Baby. In 2003 Nina Planck also was director of Greenmarket, the largest group of farmers‘ markets in the United States. Planck adopted her career in food following a period in politics, working first for Dick Gephardt and then for the American Ambassador to Britain. In 1999, she opened the first farmers' market in Islington, London, in the process setting up London Farmers' Markets, a company that now runs 20 farmers' markets in London. The New Yorker reported that the London farmers referred to her as "The American". In 2003, she returned to the United States as the director of the New York Greenmarket program; she was dismissed after six months, on December 23, 2003, following resistance from farmers to proposed changes. Ms. Planck's London Farmers‘ Markets sell, among other things, “organic & outdoor reared meat, game in season, dairy“ and fish. Her book on so-called “real food” seeks to reassure readers regarding traditional diets. Her website invites browsers to “Learn why butter and lard are good for you and corn oil and soy milk are not.” She is also a proponent of drinking raw milk.

In 2007, she gained notoriety due to a controversial op-ed in the New York Times criticizing an exclusively vegan diet for babies and children. The editorial was in response to the case of a vegan Atlanta couple who were convicted of murder and child cruelty in the death of their newborn son, whom they fed primarily soy milk and apple juice.

She lives in New York City with Robert Kaufelt, proprietor of Murray's Cheese Store, and their children: Julian, born October 24, 2006, and Jacob and Rose, born August 4, 2009. Rob and Nina were married in August 2010 and Nina took the name Kaufelt, though she continues to use Planck professionally.

== Publications ==
- The Real Food Cookbook: Traditional Dishes for Modern Cooks. Bloomsbury USA, 2014
- The Farmer's Market Cookbook. Hodder and Stoughton 2002; Kindle version, Diversion Books, 2013
- Real Food: What to Eat and Why. Bloomsbury USA 2007
- Real Food for Mother and Baby: The Fertility Diet, Eating for Two, and Baby's First Foods. Bloomsbury USA, 2009
