= Ridley Road Market =

Marketplace in the London Borough of Hackney

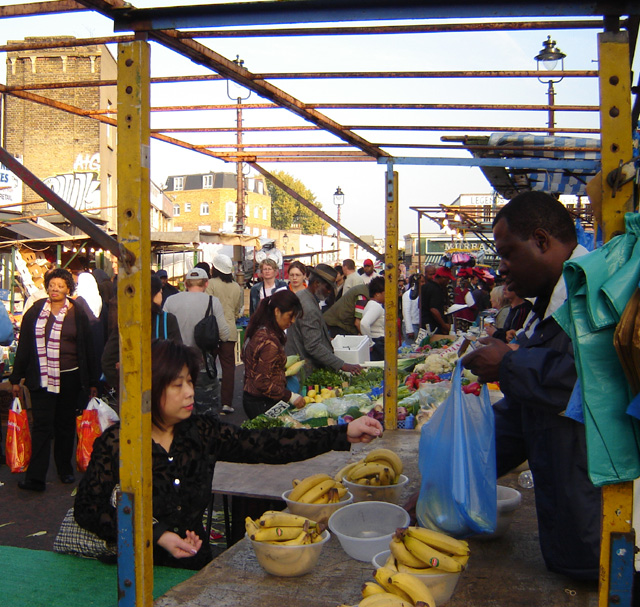
- Ridley Road Market stall, 2005
- Location: Dalston, London; 51.5481°N 0.0729°W
- Interactive map of Ridley Road Market

Ridley Road Market (known locally as Ridley Road) is the central marketplace in Dalston in the London Borough of Hackney. It is opposite Dalston Kingsland railway station, just off the Kingsland High Street section of the A10, about three miles north of the City of London. Traders sell a wide range of commodities, including food and clothing.

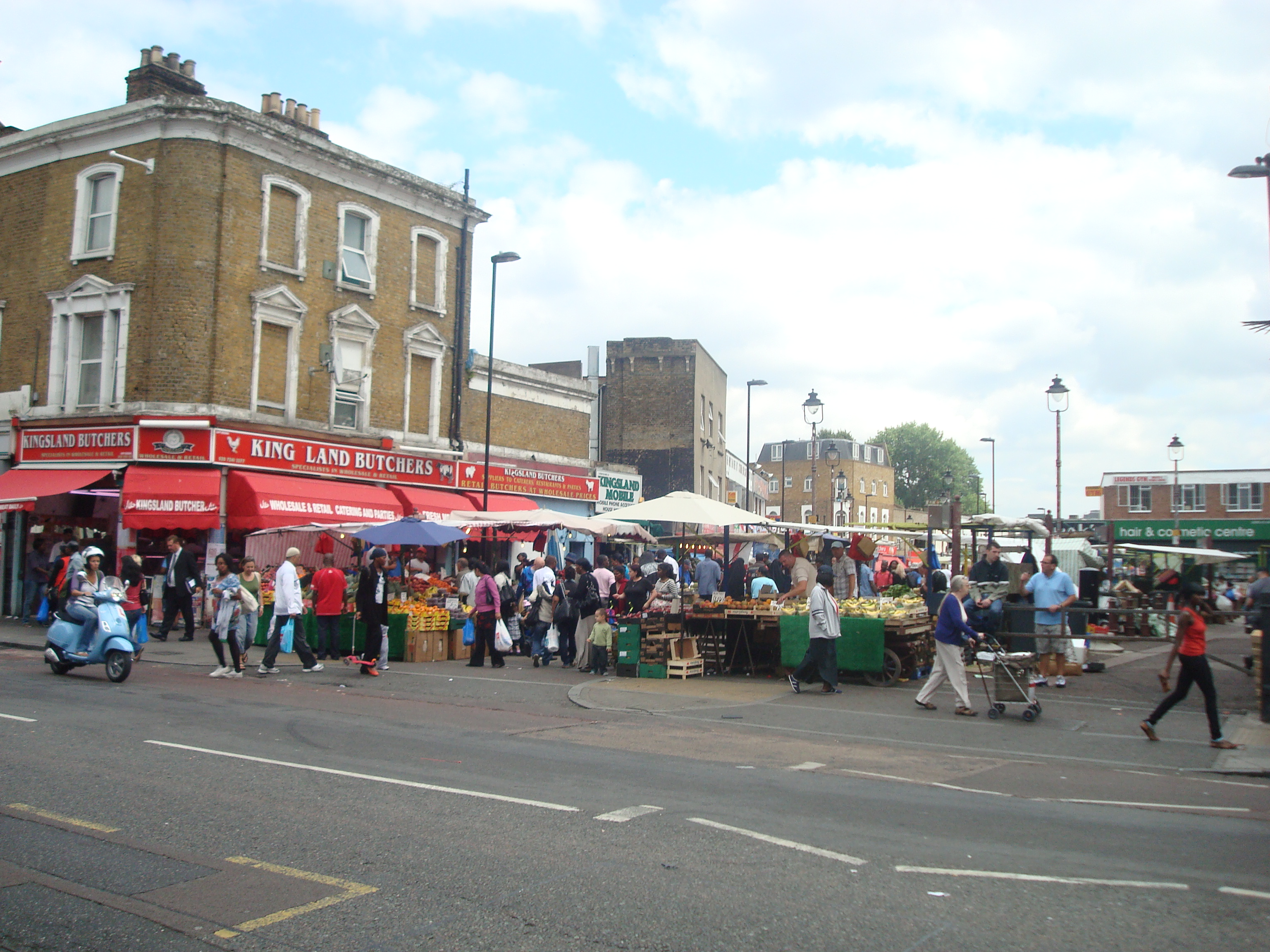
Ridley Road Market, 2010

Ridley Road Market has been in existence since the 1880s, when the land was owned by Nicholas Ridley, Bishop of London. Ridley Road is most well known for Oswald Mosley's British Union of Fascists attempts to march through the road three times after the war.

The outdoor market is run by Hackney Council, whilst the indoor Shopping Village is privately owned.

The indoor Ridley Road Shopping Village has been under the threat of closure from the private landlord intending to regenerate the site with flats. This is despite having previously been secured in 2022 when the council had been expected to take on the lease from the owner after the local campaign Save Ridley Road.

On 27 March 2026, it was announced that the indoor market would close at the end of the month, following reports that the Metropolitan Police had raised concerns about crime and anti-social behaviour, however traders and the campaign group have criticised the way this is being handled.

== See also ==
- List of markets in London
