= Seven Sisters Market =

Market in Tottenham, London, England

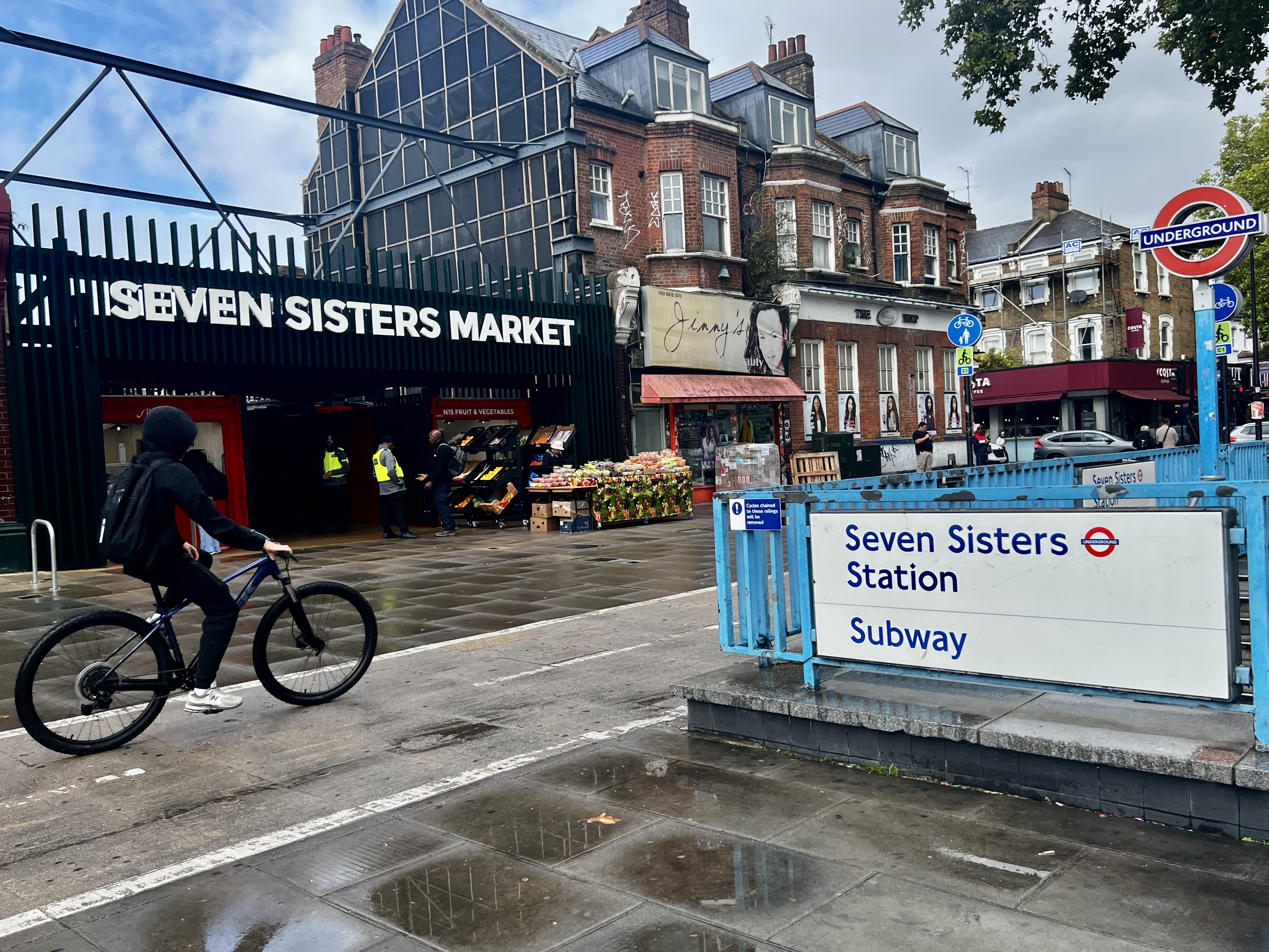
- The exterior of Seven Sisters Market in 2025
- Location: 245—253 High Road, South Tottenham, London, N15 5BT; Seven Sisters Market; 51.5834°N 0.0728°W
- Opening date: 1984 (42 years ago)
- Developer: Places for London
- Management: Market Place
- Owner: Places for London
- Architect: Transport for London/Saunders Boston
- Environment: Covered
- Goods sold: beauty, hairdressing, streetfood, jewellery, legal services, currency exchange
- Days normally open: Monday to Sunday
- Number of tenants: 40
- Website: sevensisters.market
- Location within London Borough of Haringey

Seven Sisters Market is a covered London market in the South Tottenham area of the London Borough of Haringey. The market is owned by Places for London (a wholly owned subsidiary of Transport for London).

== History ==
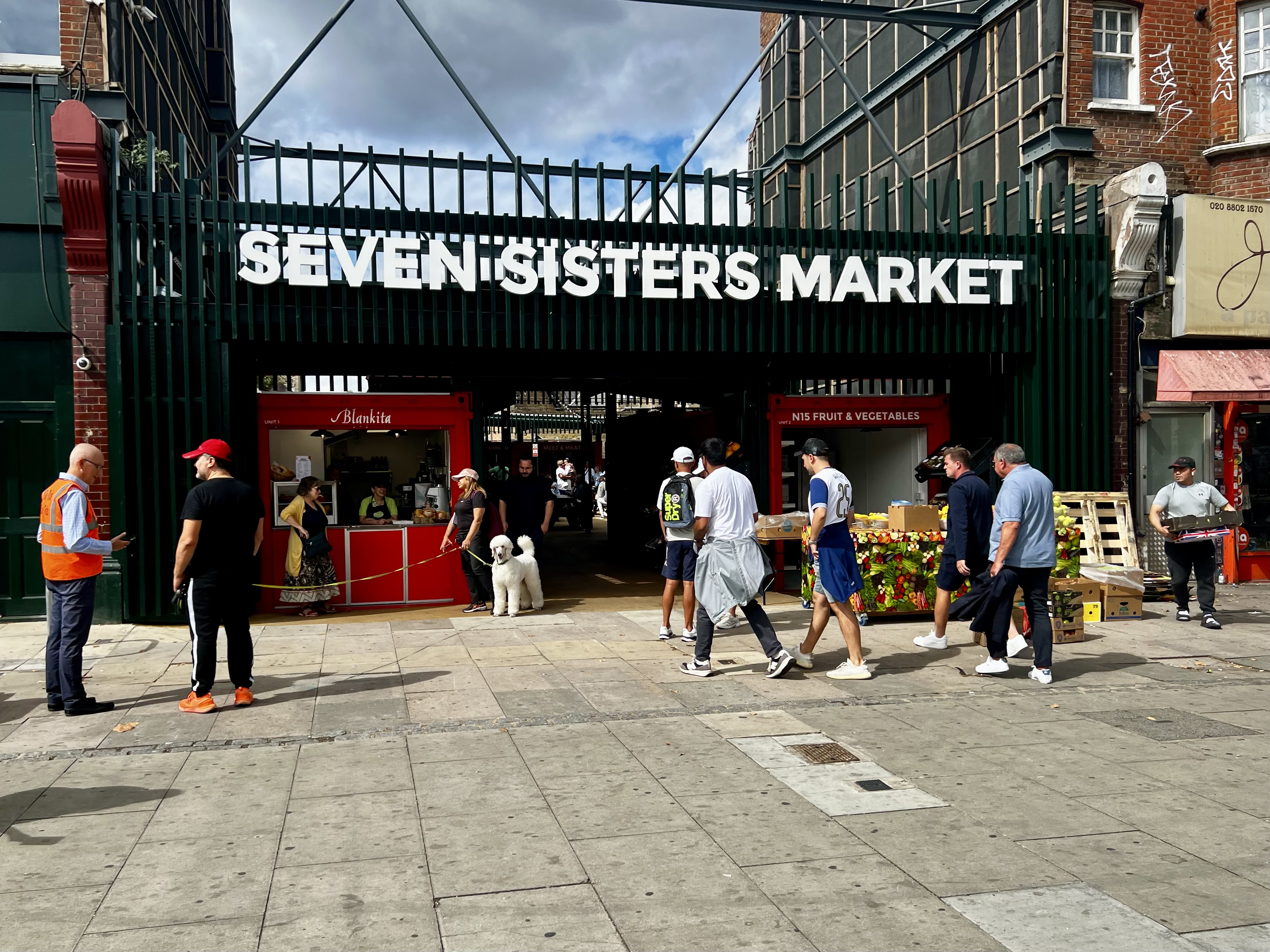
Seven Sisters Market opens to the public

Seven Sister Market (a.k.a. Latin Village and a.k.a. Pueblito Paisa) is a general retail market where traders sell clothing and accessories, household goods, retail and street food, as well as services such as hair and beauty. The market takes place on the site of the former Wards Department Store and was started by Jill Oakley in 1984.

The majority of the traders are from South and Central America and the fashion and food reflect their backgrounds. The market became an important hub for the Latin American community in London. The market has served as a first stop for many Latin American migrants looking to find guidance, support, and community.

In 2019, property developer Grainger plc made a compulsory purchase of the site of the market for an intended residential development with retail at street level.

The old Seven Sisters Market

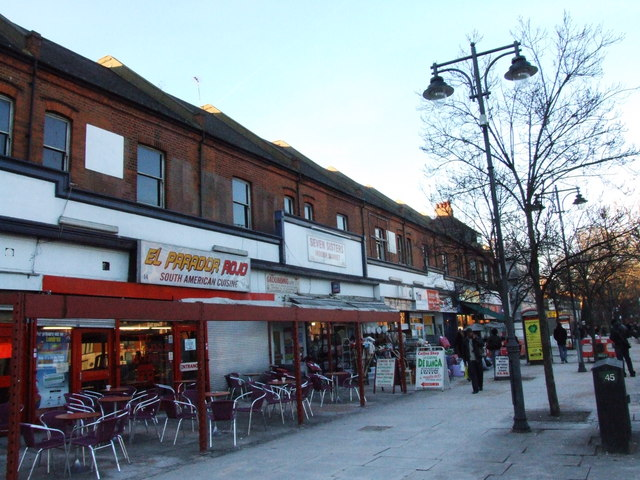
The old market entrance viewed from the High Road

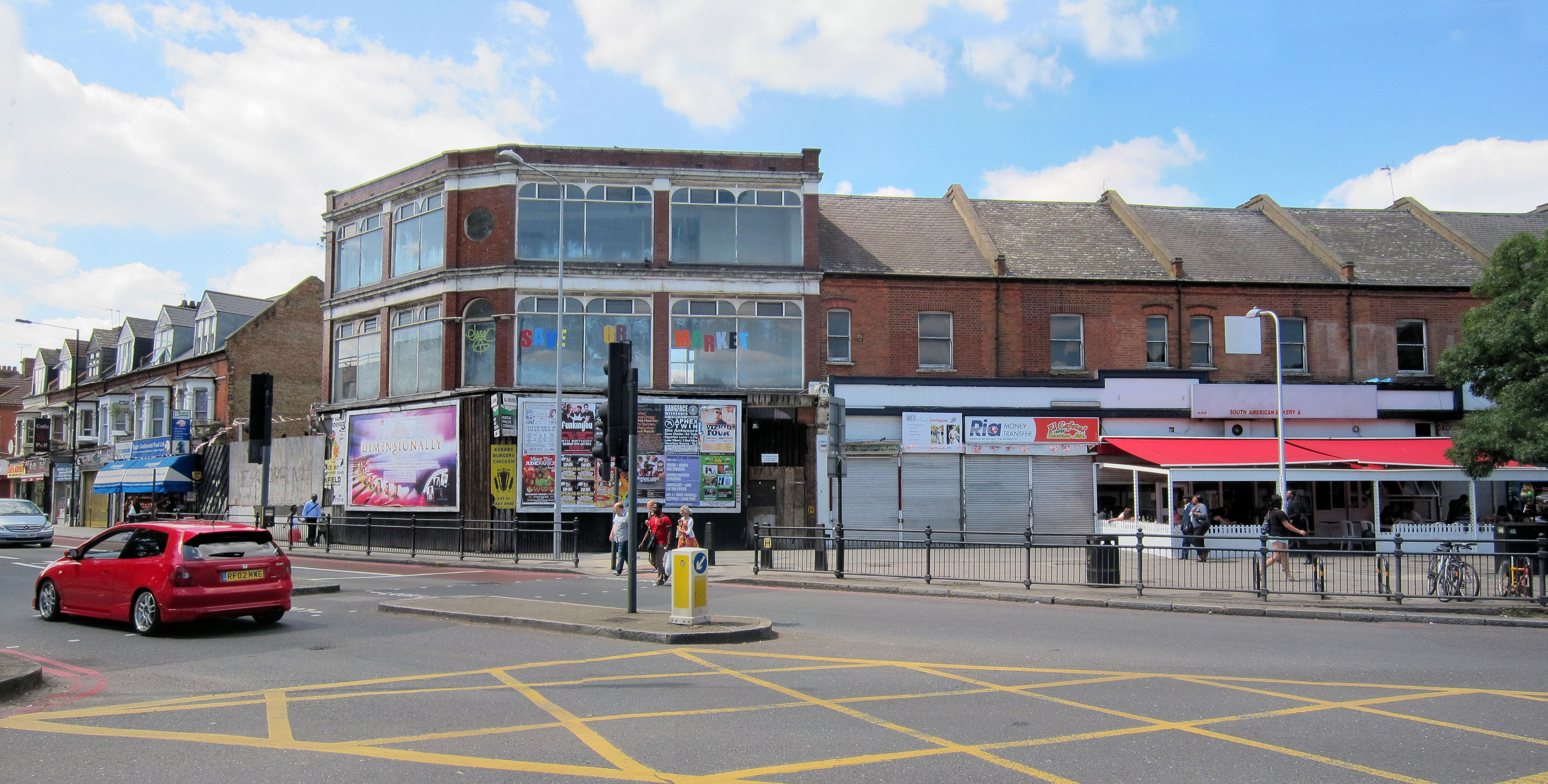
The old market entrance viewed from the other side of the High Road

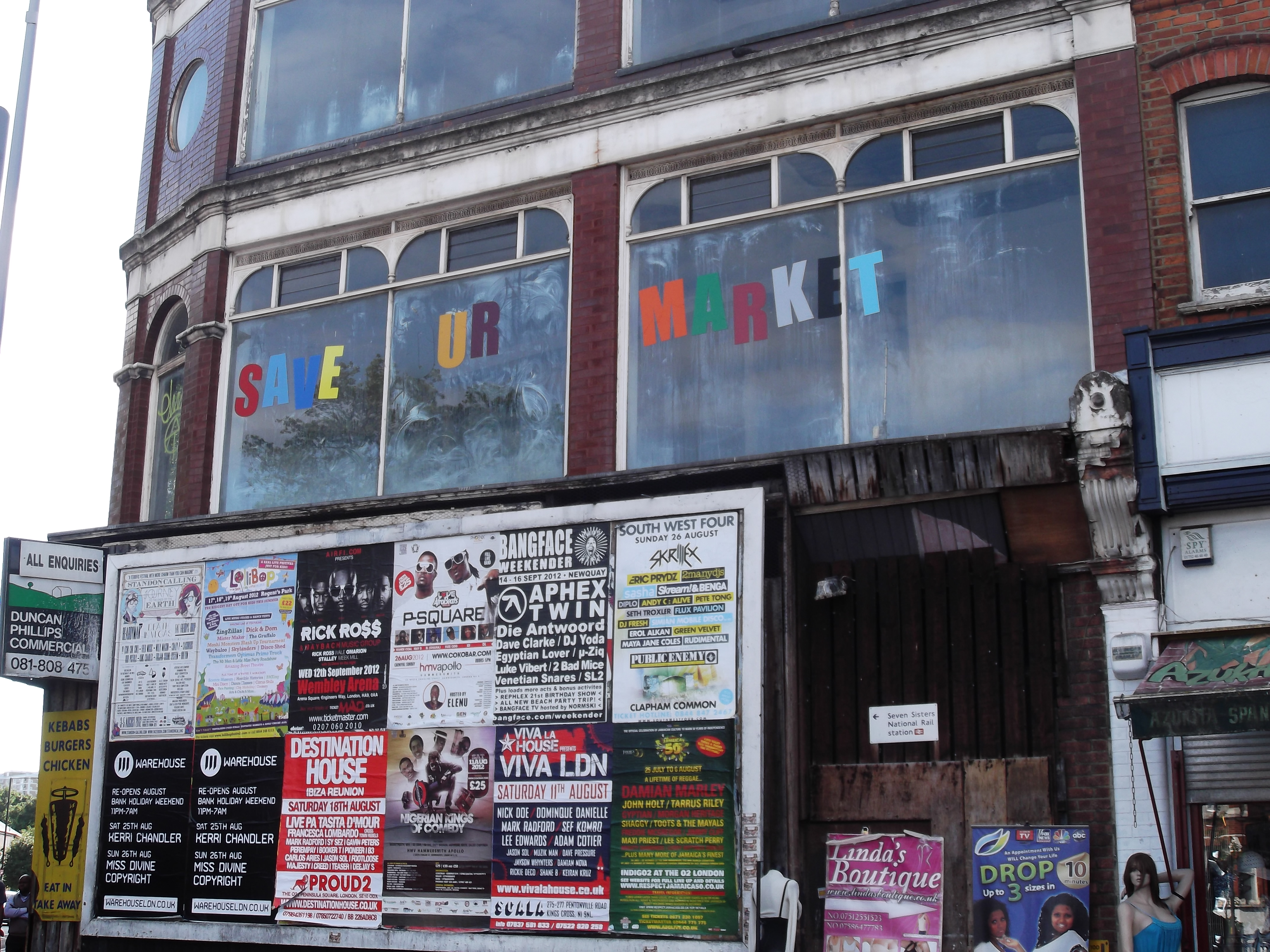
Wards Corner decorated with campaign posters

The traders, other local campaigners, and diverse supporters fought a long campaign to prevent the development and to continue the market. The campaign drew support from (the future British Prime Minister, then mayor of London) Boris Johnson and drew a rebuke to the British Government from the Office of the United Nations High Commissioner for Human Rights. In 2021 Grainger announced that it has abandoned its planned development citing changes economic conditions.

All public Markets in England were closed in 2020 as the British government attempted to control the transmission of SARS-CoV-2 during the COVID-19 pandemic. Whilst the market was closed, Places for London identified safety issues with the site and the market remained closed after the Government ended control measures. The market reopen in September 2025 in a temporary purpose built site, adjacent to the original, whilst the main building is refurbished.

Seven Sisters Market in 2025

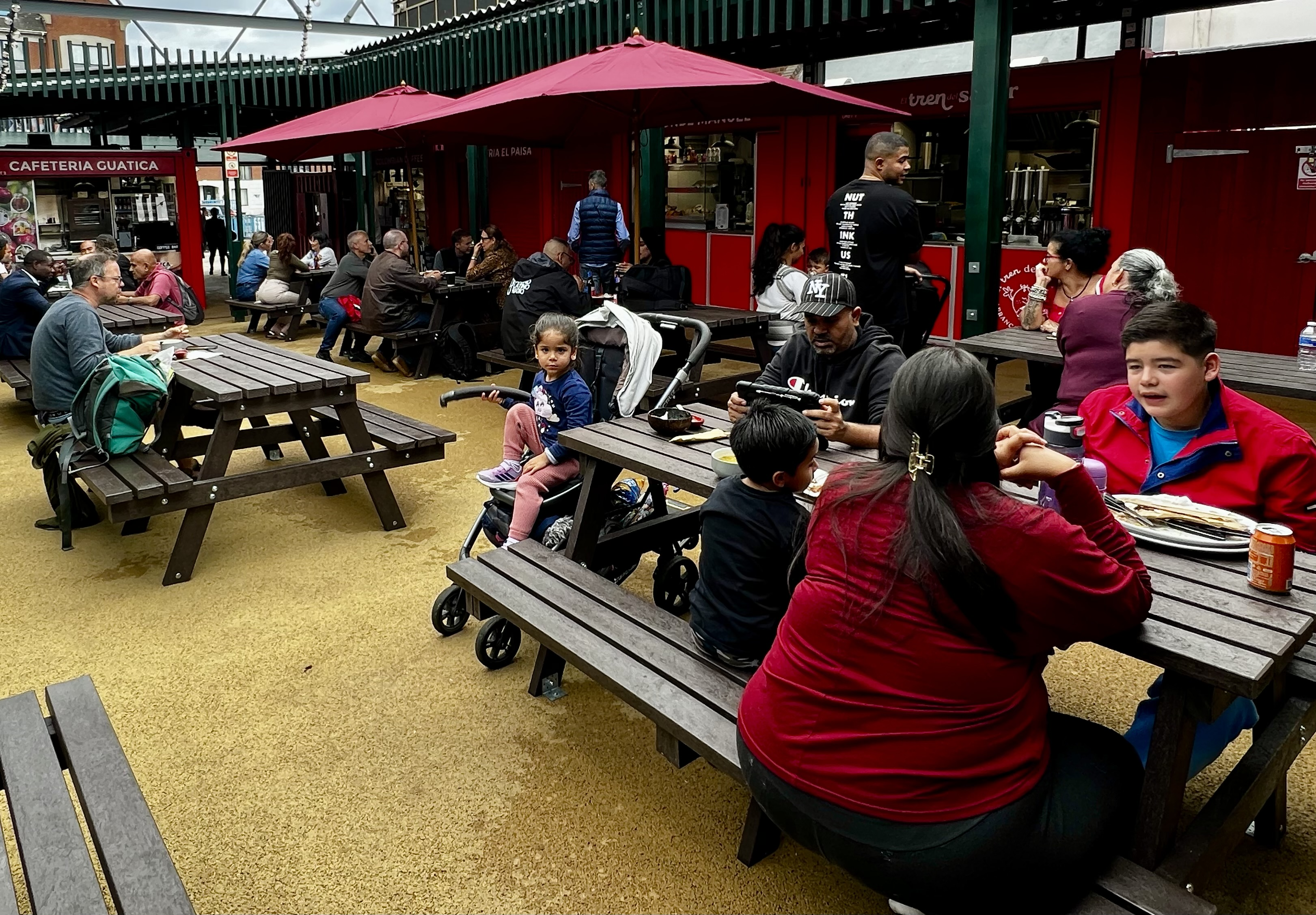
Seven Sisters food court filled with visitors

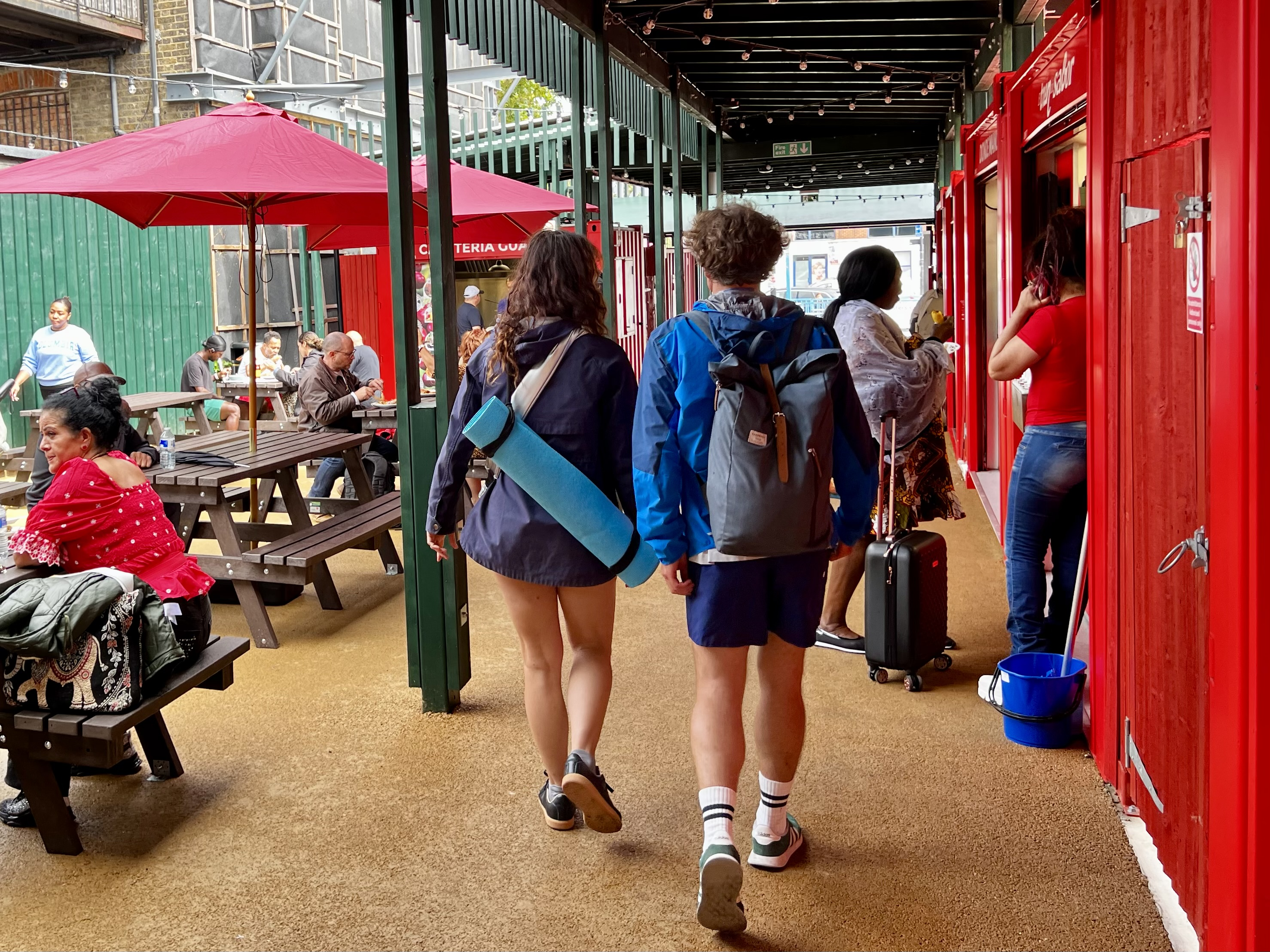
A couple passes through Seven Sisters Market’s food court

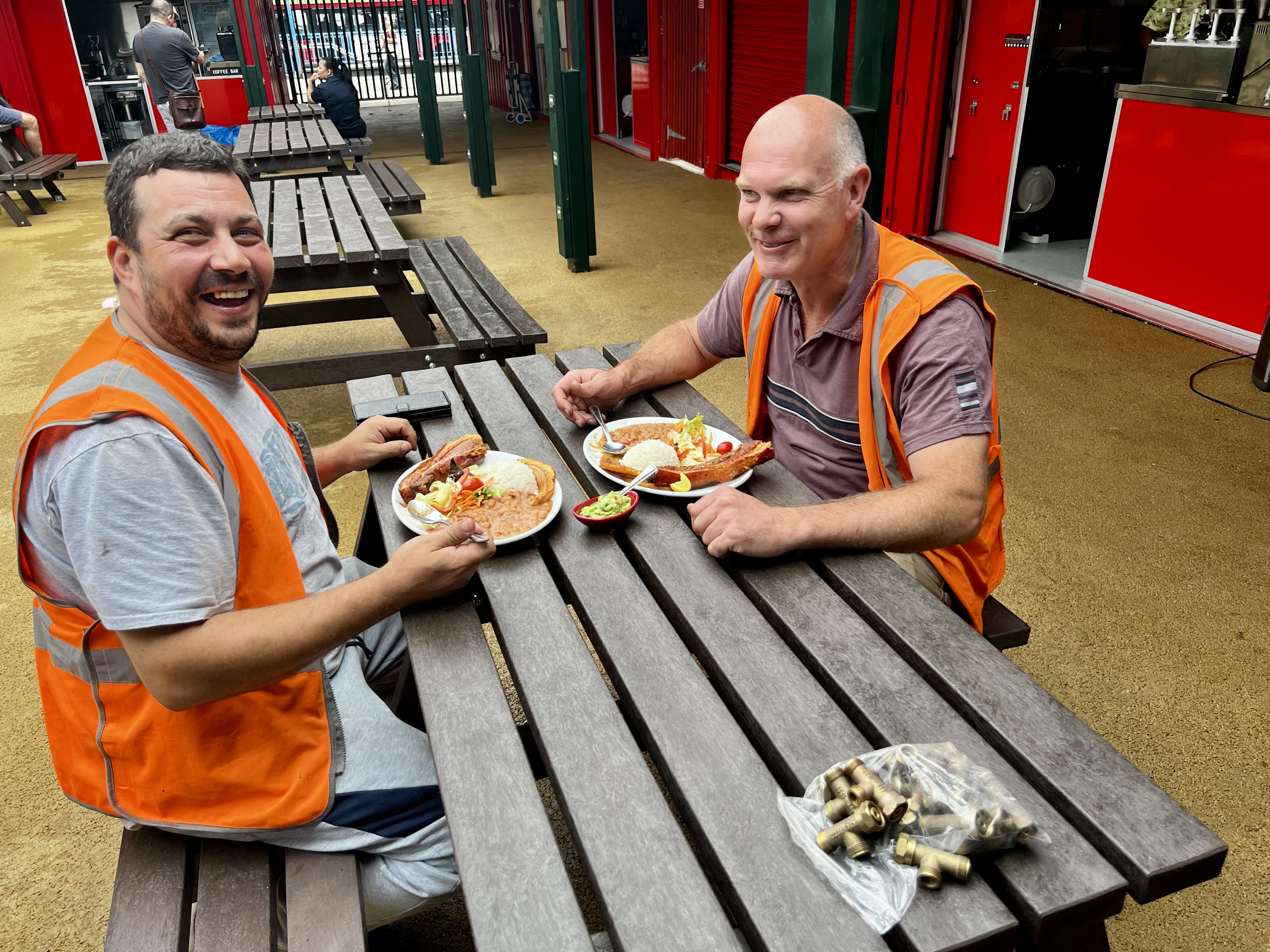
Two builders eat the first meal served at, the newly re-opened, Seven Sisters Market

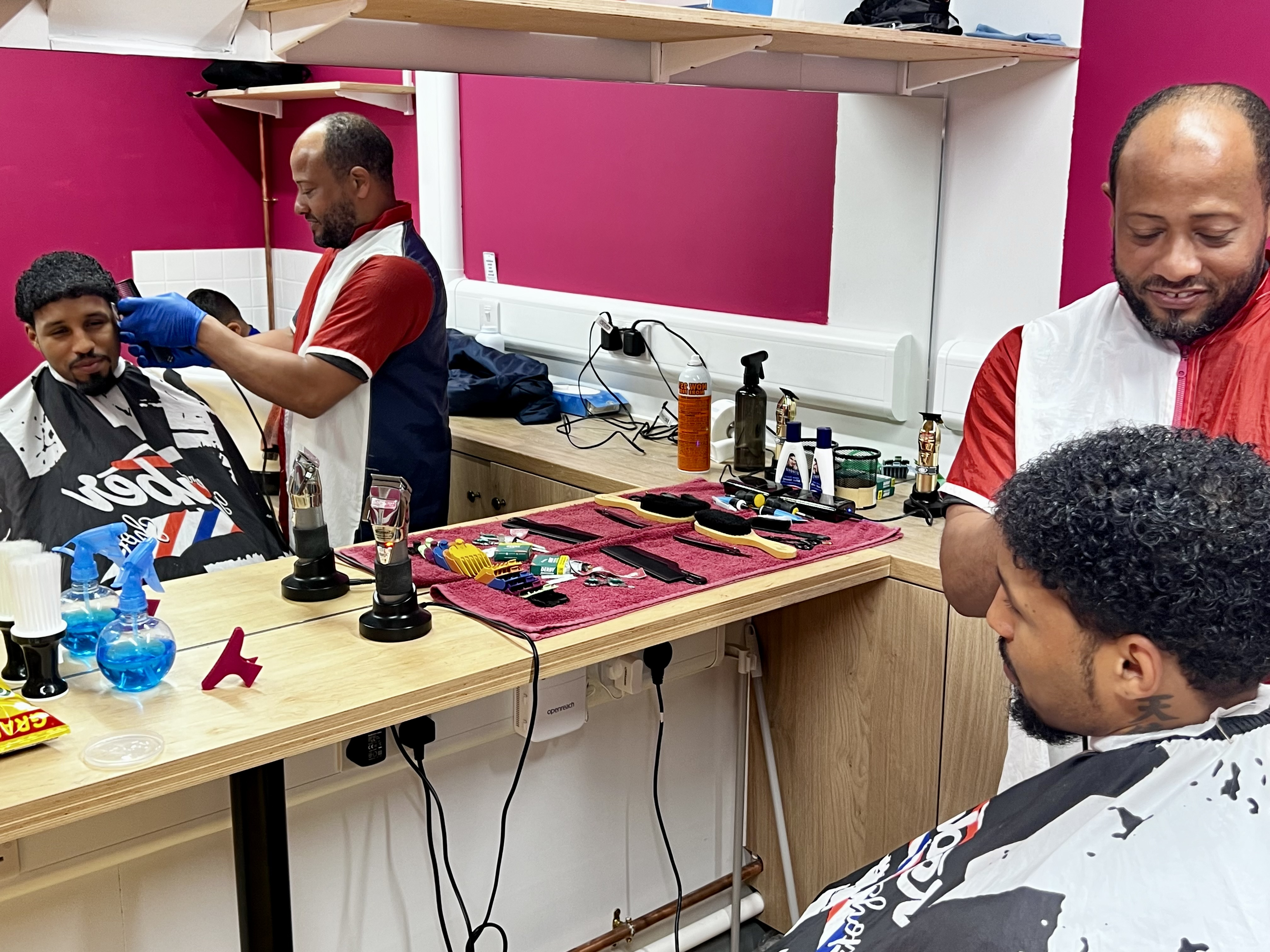
Miguel, the Market Supervisor, gets his haircut at Seven Sisters Market

== Transport ==
=== Bus ===
Bus routes 76, 149, 243, 259, 279, 318, 349, and 476 pass close to the market.

=== Cycling ===
Tottenham High Road is on the C1 Cycleway.

=== Railway and tube ===
The nearest stations are the Seven Sisters tube and overground interchange station and the South Tottenham overground station.
