= Camden Passage =

Pedestrian street in London, England

Coordinates: 51°32′07″N 0°06′12″W

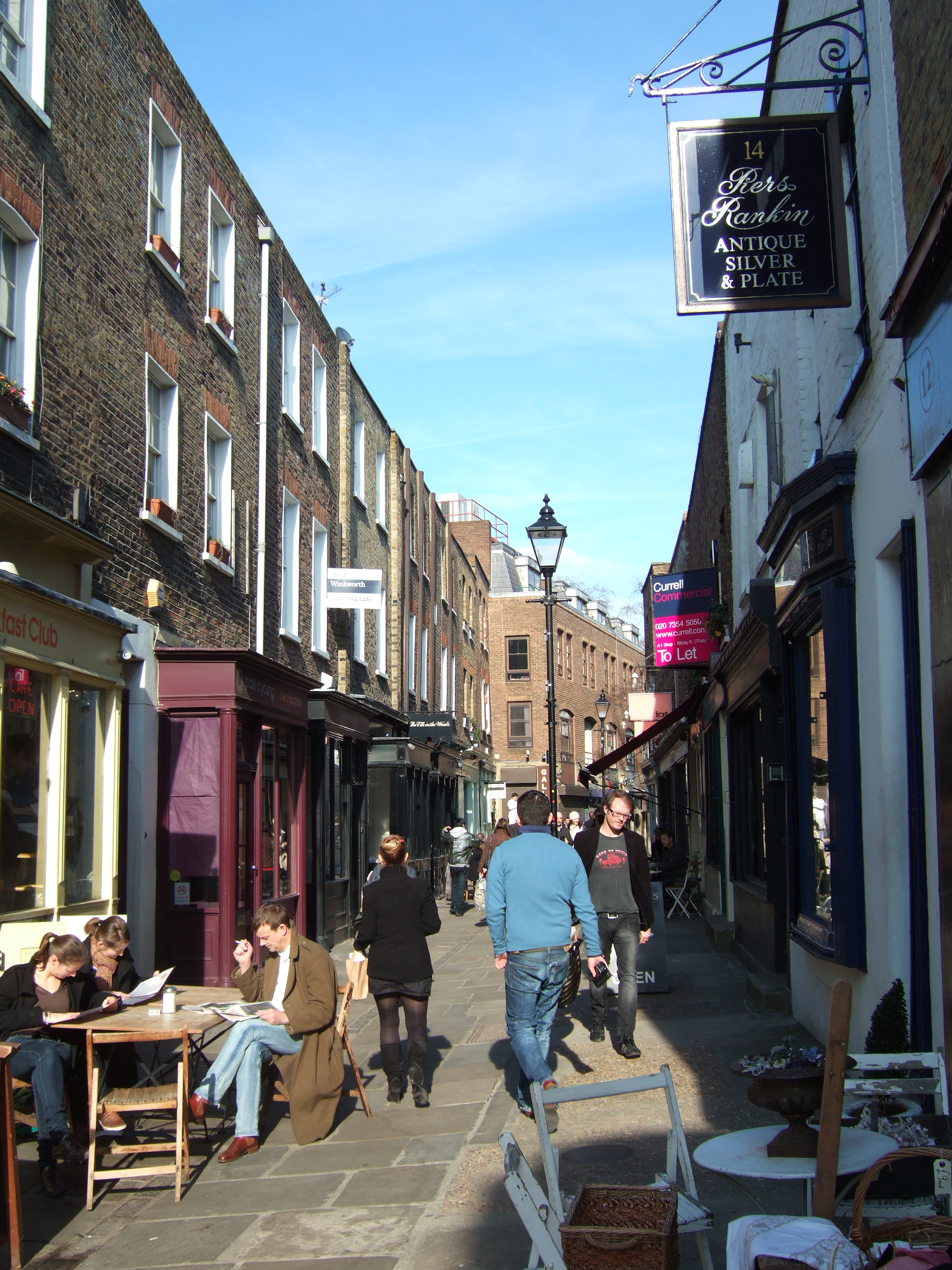
Camden Passage in 2009

Camden Passage is a pedestrian street, close to the Angel tube station off Upper Street in the London Borough of Islington. The passage is known for its antique shops, markets and its array of independent shops, cafes, and restaurants.

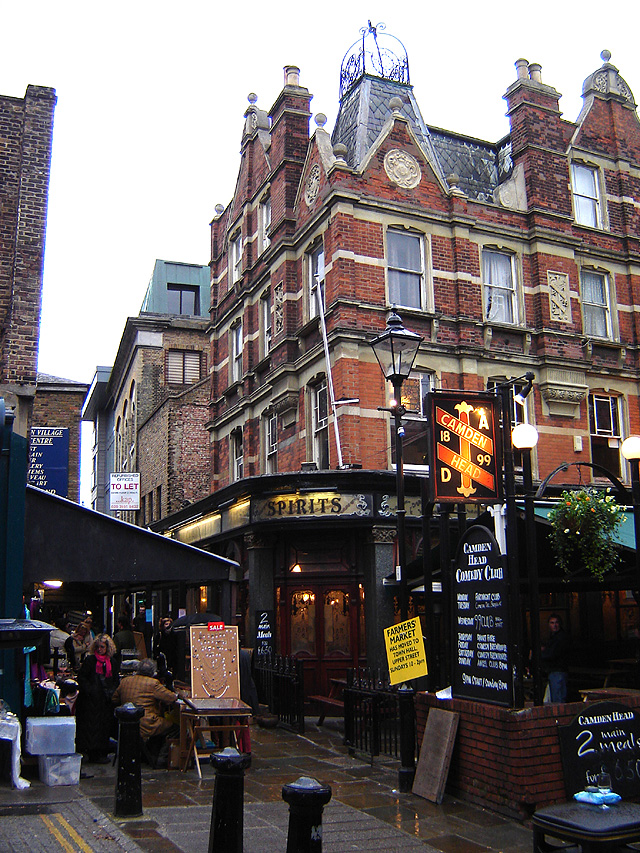
The Camden Head

The independent shops, cafes and restaurants are typically open seven days a week, and the Angel Comedy club runs nightly at the Camden Head public house.

== History ==
The passage was built, as an alley, along the backs of houses on Upper Street, then Islington High Street, in 1767.

However it was not initially named Camden Passage, instead being composed of several other alleys, including Milton Place, Pierrepoint Row, Pierrepoint Terrace and Cumberland Row. The renaming of the subsidiary parts to Camden Passage occurred during the 1800s. The first street in the area to take the name Camden was Camden Street, now known as Camden Walk, which adjoins Camden Passage. Building of Camden Street commenced in 1765, and was named for Charles Pratt, 1st Earl Camden who assumed the title Baron Camden that year. As recorded in Jackson's Oxford Journal, 2 November 1765:

The new Street now building near Mr. Pullen's farm, at Islington, is on a Piece of Ground belonging to Mr Rosoman, the Master of Sadler's Wells, and is to be called Camden Street, out of Compliment to the celebrated Chief Justice of that Name, who is so highly, and so deservedly esteemed in this kingdom.

The antiques market was founded in the 1960s, in conjunction with the Metropolitan Borough of Islington by John Payton. The venture was initially successful, attracting over 350 traders, but recently the centre of Islington has undergone regeneration, leading to higher rents being asked at the renewal of leases.

Following some years of lying derelict, a former tram shed was reopened on 14 November 1979, as The Mall Antiques Arcade (not to be confused with nearby Pierrepont Arcade Market), and at its height housed over 35 dealers on its ground and lower ground floors. The building also housed other businesses, such as a restaurant in its upper floors, but the mall closed in 2008. In 2013, it became a Jack Wills shop, and as of 2014 was a Superdry store. In 2016, it became a sofa.com store and then Amazon Fresh in December 2021.

The closure of the arcade reflects the reduction in the number of antique traders in the nearby Camden Passage. The building is a Grade II listed building. Its severe windowless brick aspect is dictated by its original use, English Heritage describe its architecture as influenced by, and a tribute to, Newgate Prison (by George Dance the Younger), which had been demolished in 1902, three years before this building's construction by the LCC.
