= London Farmers' Markets =

London Farmers' Markets is an organisation operating certified Farmers' markets in Greater London.

== History ==
The organisation was set up in 1999 by the food writer Nina Planck, based on her experience of selling produce from her family farm at Farmers' Markets in Virginia, United States. The first Farmers' Market set up by LFM in London was in Islington in 1999, quickly followed by Farmers' Markets in Notting Hill, Blackheath, Peckham and Swiss Cottage.

== Current status ==
The Islington Farmers' Market is still running, having moved location more than once. It now takes place on the historic Chapel Market site every Sunday.

There are now 20 Farmers' Markets operated by LFM in London, all of which are certified by FARMA.

== LFM-operated farmers' markets ==
- Balham Farmers' Market
- Blackheath Farmers' Market
- Bloomsbury Farmers' Market
- Brixton Farmers' Market
- Broadgate Farmers' Market
- Ealing Farmers' Market
- Islington Farmers' Market
- London Bridge (Tuesday)
- Marylebone Farmers' Market
- Notting Hill Farmers' Market
- Parliament Hill Farmers' Market
- Parsons' Green Farmers' Market
- Pimlico Farmers' Market
- Queen's Park Farmers' Market
- South Kensington Farmers' Market Sat Bute St & Tues Imperial College
- Swiss Cottage Farmers' Market
- Twickenham Farmers' Market
- Walthamstow Farmers' Market
- West Hampstead Farmers' Market
- Wimbledon Farmers' Market

== Awards ==
In February 2012, it was announced by FARMA that Queen's Park Farmers' Market was the first Farmers' Market in London to win their Farmers' Market of the Year award, held jointly with Mosely Farmers' Market in Birmingham.
