= Murray's Cheese =

Cheese shop in New York City

Coordinates: 40.7310376°N 74.0031512°W

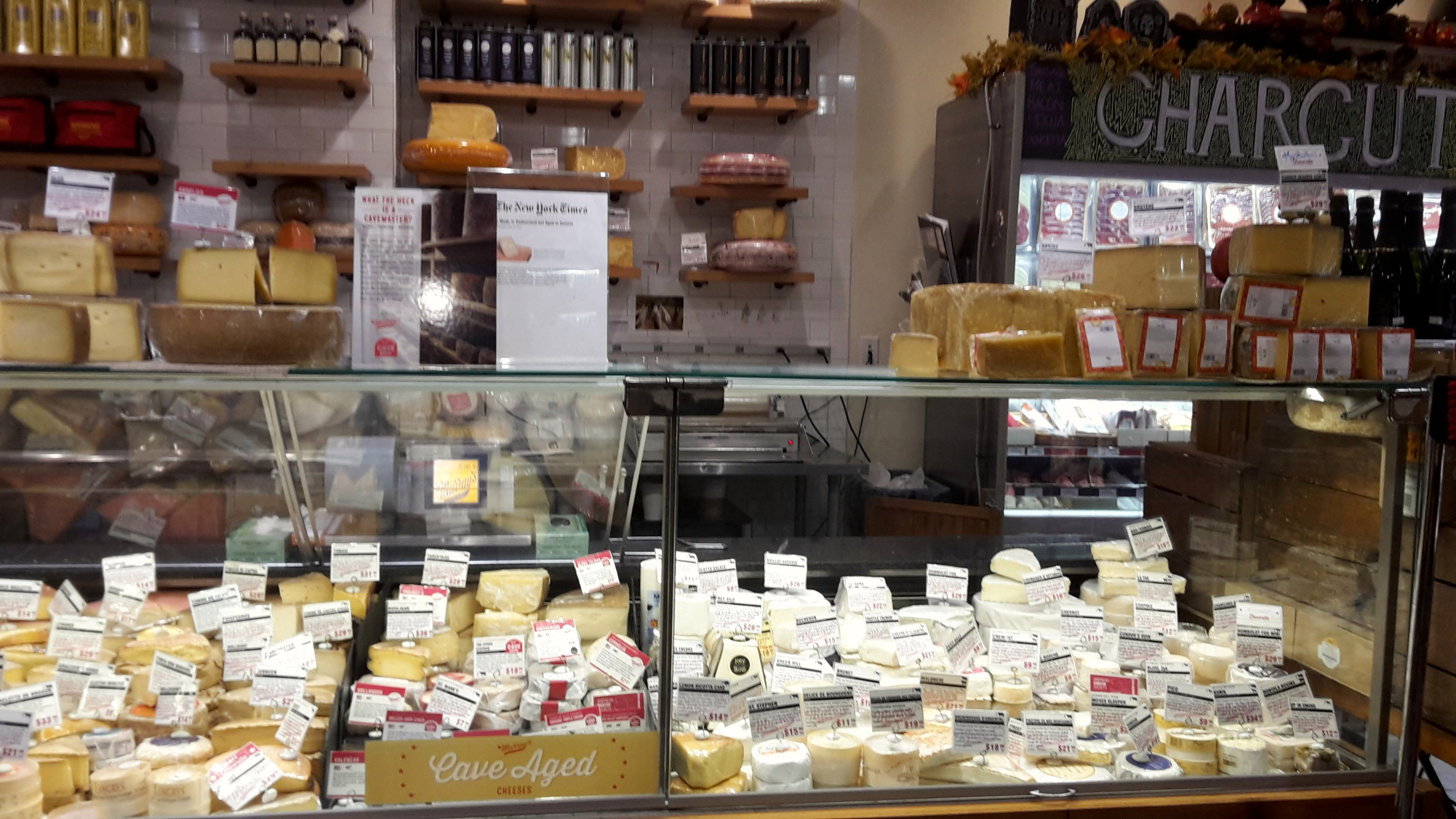
- Murray's Cheese shop
- Type: Private
- Industry: Food
- Founded: 1962 c. (64 years ago) in Greenwich Village, Manhattan
- Founder: Murray Greenberg
- Fate: Acquired
- Headquarters: Greenwich Village, New York City, United States
- Number of locations: 800+ (2021)
- Services: Artisanal cheese and specialty foods retailer and wholesaler
- Owner: Kroger Company

Murray's Cheese is an artisanal cheese and specialty foods retailer and wholesaler based in Greenwich Village in New York City. It was founded in Greenwich Village in 1962 as a spinoff of Glen Alden farms, an egg and dairy wholesaler. The company later expanded, and in 2012 opened a restaurant in Manhattan named Murray's Cheese Bar. In February 2017 the franchise was acquired by the Kroger Company. As of 2021, there are more than 800 locations.

== History ==
The store was founded by Murray Greenberg, born Moische Schuchelmann a Ukrainian-Jewish immigrant, in Greenwich Village in 1962 initially as a spinoff of an egg and dairy wholesaler, Glen Alden Farms. Louis Tudda later took over as the store's owner until 1991, when the store was purchased by Robert Kaufelt, who published the 2006 book The Murray's Cheese Handbook. Murray's formed a partnership with the Kroger Company in 2007 to place branded shops selling cheese and other foods in select Kroger supermarkets in the United States. New York City Mayor Ed Koch during his lifetime was among the specialty store's faithful customers. Murray's was voted the "Best Cheese Shop in New York" by Time Out New York in 2007.

After a second location was opened in New York's Grand Central Market in Grand Central Terminal in 2002, in 2008 a charcuterie named Murray's Real Salami opened, also in Grand Central Market. In 2010 the two Grand Central Market locations merged to become a second flagship store. After 2010, Murray's has since expanded to include a 48-seat cheese-centered wine bar and restaurant (also located in Greenwich Village) named Murray's Cheese Bar, opened in 2012.

On February 7, 2017, it was announced that Kroger Company had purchased Murray's Cheese.

In 2021 an article by Andrew Silverstein in The Forward refuted an odd couple of facts in the purported mythos of Murray's; first correcting that it was founded circa 1962 rather than 1940, and second that Greenberg did not fight in the Spanish Civil War as then stated on the Murray's cheese website.

== Gallery ==
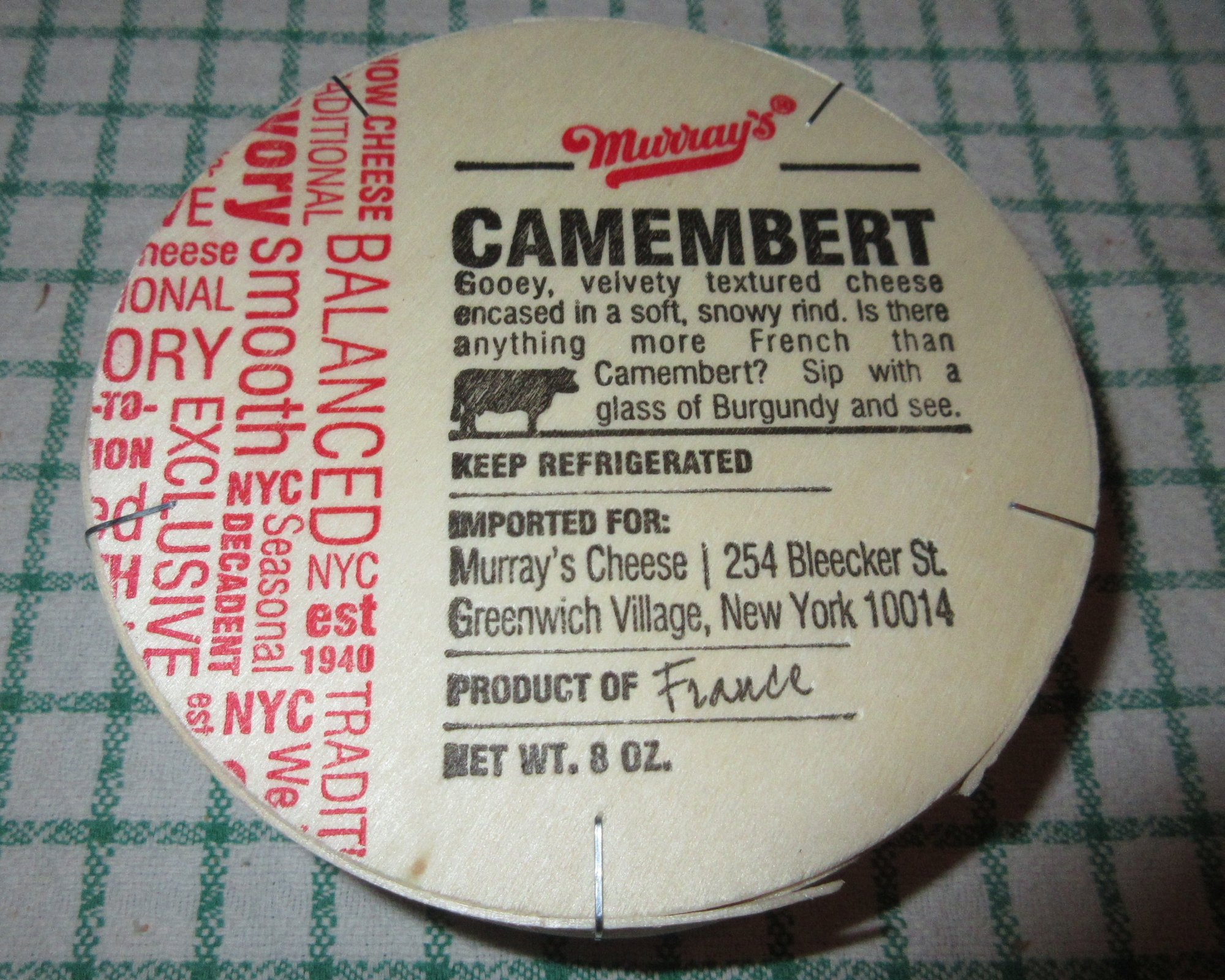
Camembert fermier product of France

The store ages cheese in a state-of-the-art caves facility in their warehouse in Long Island City. The company has a line of Cave Master exclusive cheese, which is aged in its caves. In 2016, Murray's launched a new Cave Master variation titled Annelies, made in cooperation with Swiss cheese maker Walter Räss. In April 2017, Murray's Cheese introduced a new exclusive cheddar, Ezra, to its Cave Master line. It was the first "cheese created from initial concept into R&D by Murray’s, made by Murray’s, and then aged in Murray’s Cheese caves." The Ezra cheese was developed in collaboration with Cornell University and Old Chatham Creamery in New York. The store sells Danish cheeses such as Havarti and Tilsit cheese, and in April 2017, it added a collection of artisanal organic Danish cheeses. The company imported a dozen types, including Danish White Cheese, Vita Mundo, Flora Mundo, Versterhavsost, and Trelleborg.

== Classes ==
In July 2017, the company launched its Game of Tommes class, which has a cheeseboard inspired by Game of Thrones.
