= Piccadilly Market =

Market in London

Coordinates: 51°30′31.64″N 0°8′13.33″W

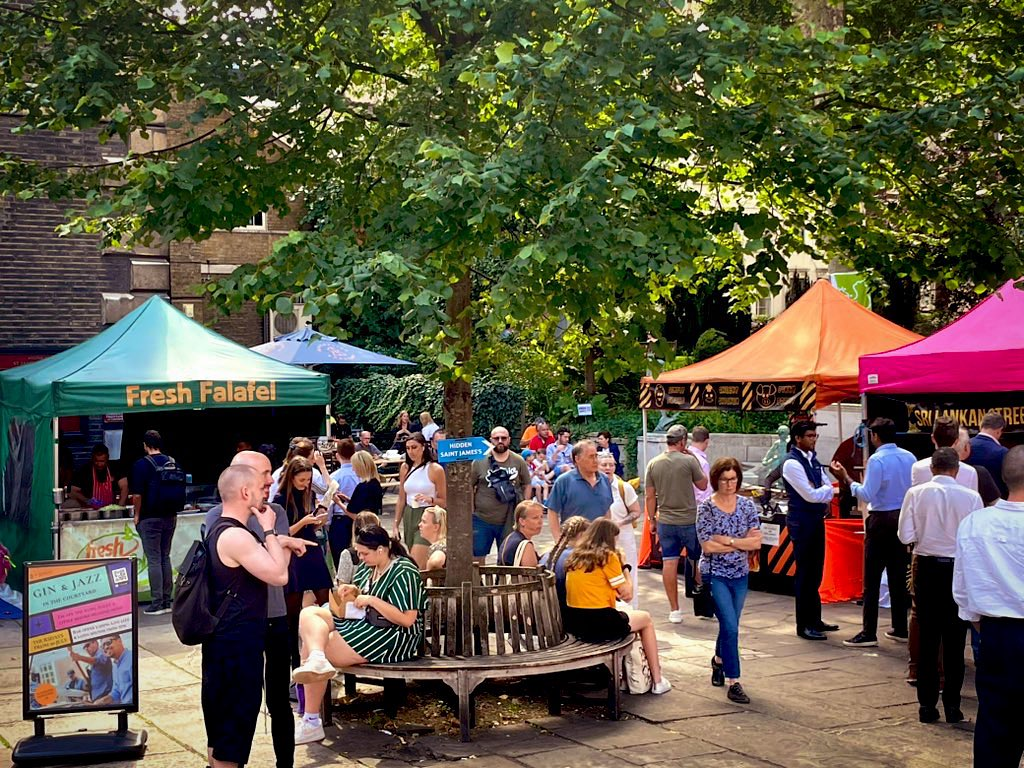
Food market in the courtyard at St James's Piccadilly 2024

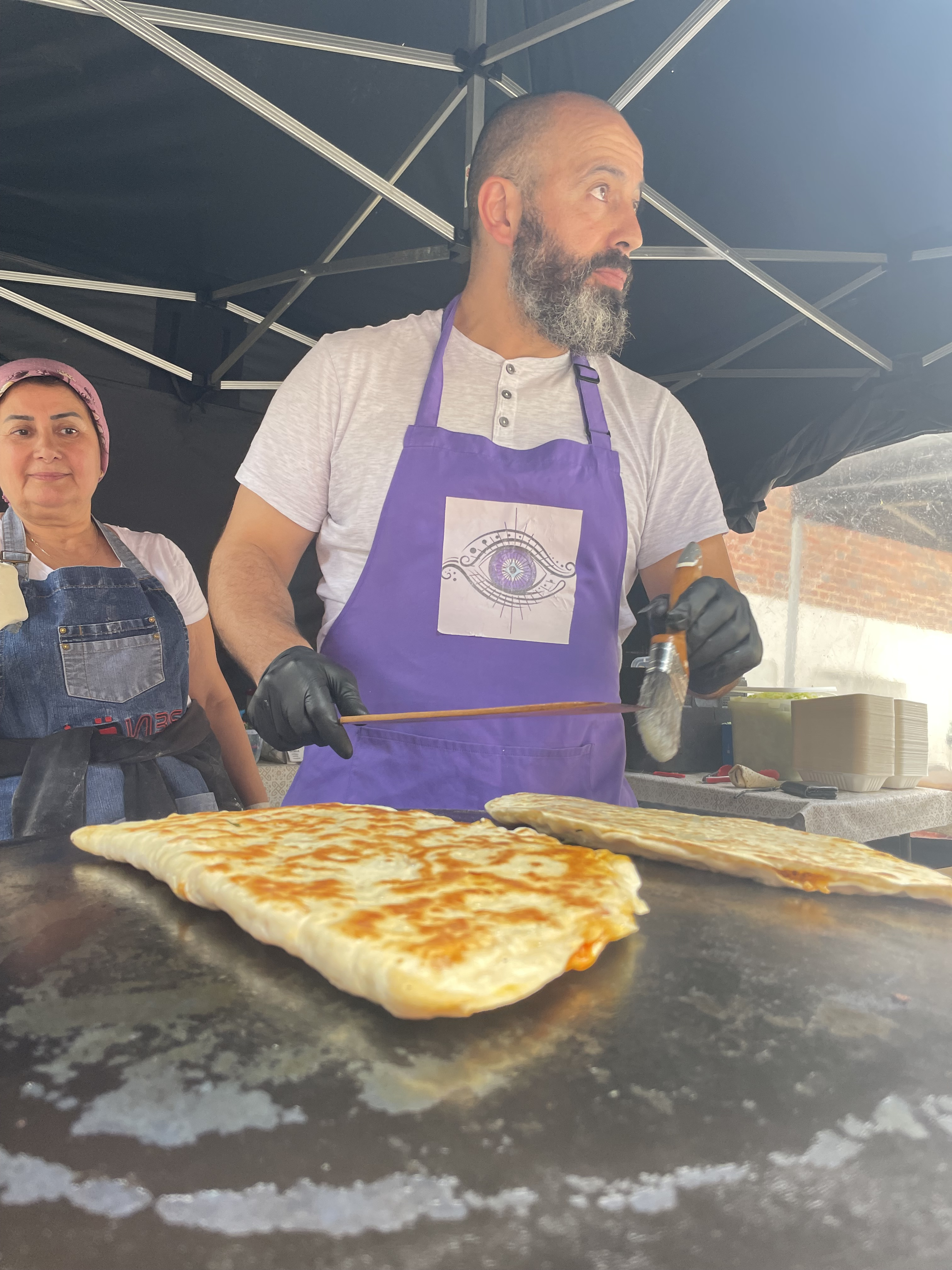
Preparing fresh food in St James's courtyard, Street Food Market 2022

Piccadilly Market at St James's Church Piccadilly is now a five-day-a-week lunchtime food market in the St James's district of the City of Westminster. Occupying the courtyard on the North side of St James's Church, Piccadilly. It is close to Piccadilly Circus, Fortnum & Mason and The Ritz London Hotel.

== History ==
Formerly an Arts and Crafts market, first held at St James's Church, Piccadilly in 1981 as part of the Piccadilly Arts Festival, the market opened permanently in 1984, operating two days a week. Over the last 13 years, the Piccadilly Market has expanded and now focuses on street food, in partnership with StreetFoodish, offering local workers and tourists global flavours..

== Traders ==
Rent paid by traders contributes to the upkeep of St James's Church Piccadilly: a Sir Christopher Wren masterpiece and registered UK charity.

StreetFoodish has become a launchpad for aspiring entrepreneurs, offering an affordable entry into the food business for first-generation immigrants and local artisans.

"Whether you’re a regular patron or a curious passer-by, there’s a sense of camaraderie that permeates the air: a shared appreciation for good food and good company. In a world that often feels divided, these markets serve as beacons of unity, reminding us of our shared humanity and the importance of gathering, even if just for a meal. But perhaps most importantly, this partnership is about more than just food—it’s about nourishing the soul." Blog by Derrie Shurville.

Piccadilly Market was described by Time Out Magazine as where "quintessential church fête meets West End London chic."

Today, Piccadilly Market hosts around 40 traders rotating across five trading days, making it one of the most diverse food markets in central London. Visitors can sample a wide array of global cuisines, reflecting the multicultural fabric of the city and the inclusive ethos of the market.

== Gallery ==
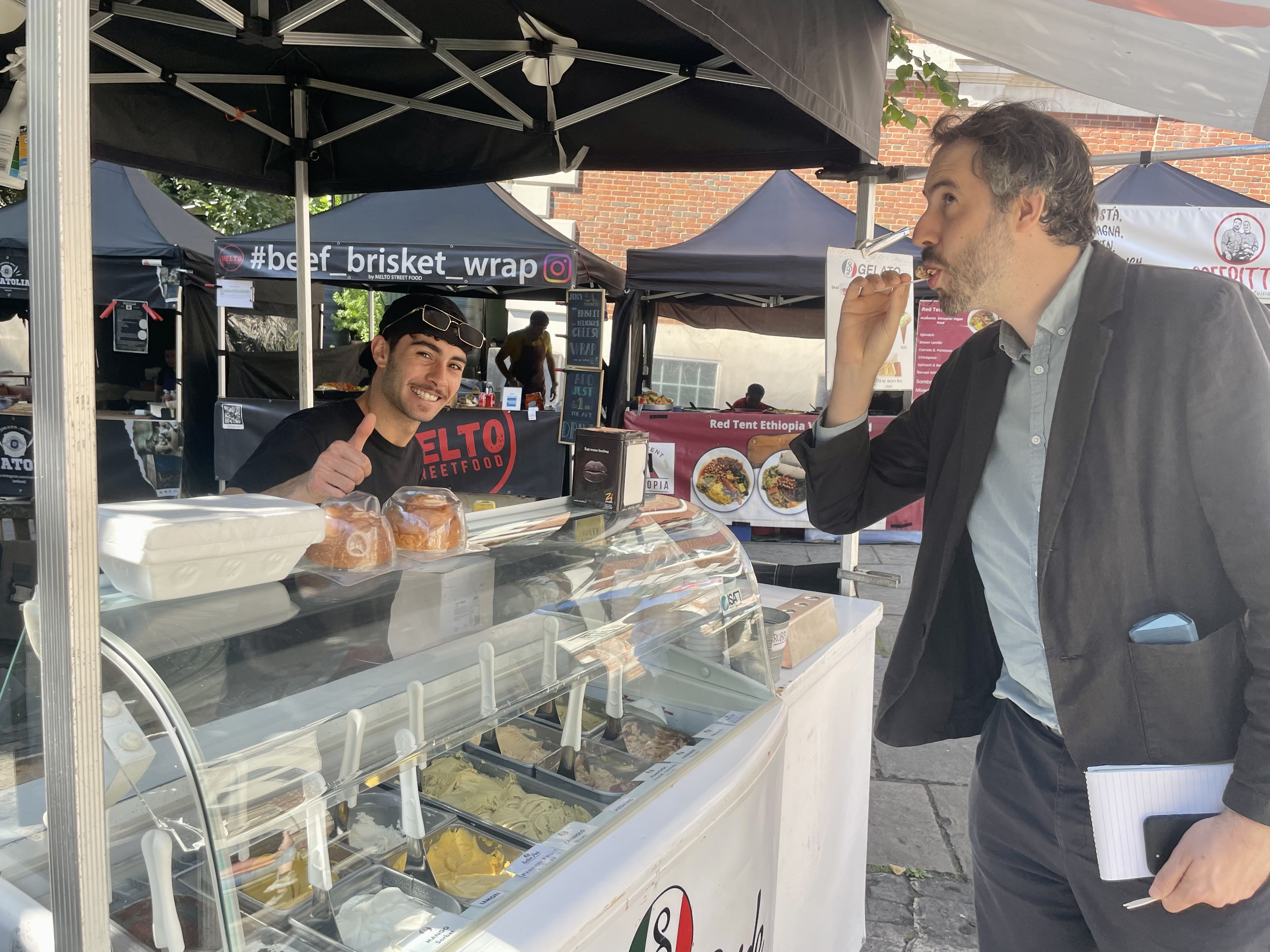
St James's Piccadilly ice cream stall at food market 2023

== See also ==
- St James's Church, Piccadilly
- St James's
