= Farringdon Market =

Former market in London

Coordinates: 51.5162°N 0.1057°W

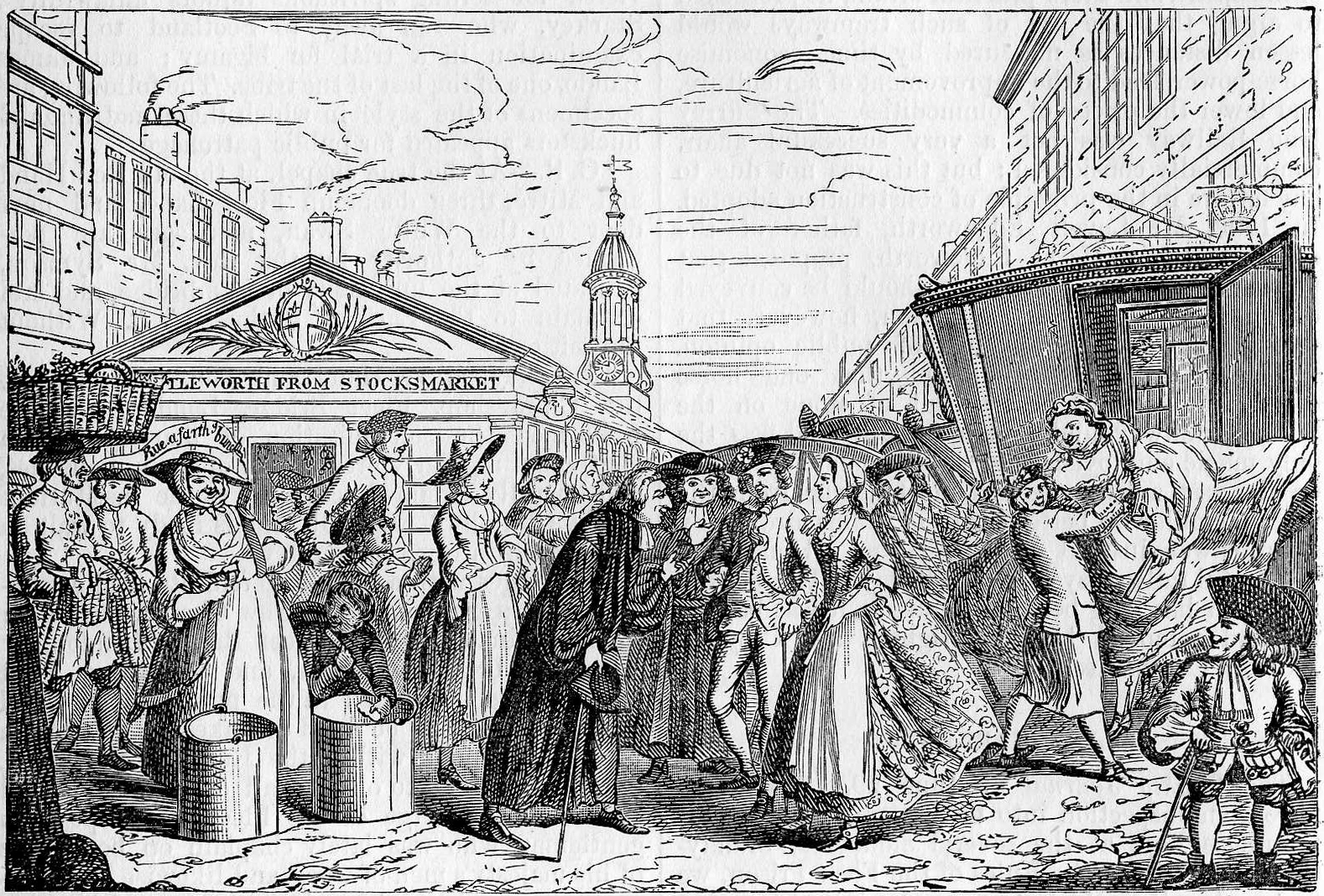
A scene outside Farringdon Market

Farringdon Market was a market erected in 1829 in London, England, to replace the Fleet Market, which had been cleared for the widening of Farringdon Street and Farringdon Road. The market was between Farringdon Street east and Shoe Lane west, north of Stonecutter Street, in the City of London ward of Farringdon Without.

The market covered 1.5 acres (0.01 km^{2}) and cost about £250,000. On 20 November 1829, the market opened and was described in a contemporary account: "It forms a handsome and elevated quadrangle, of 232 feet by 150 feet. The purchase of the ground, and the buildings which stood thereon, is estimated in round numbers at £200,000; the building of the market, including paviours' accounts, &c., is stated at £80,000. The avenue under which are the shops of the dealers, and which extends round three sides of the building, is 25 feet high, to what are technically termed the tie-beams, with ventilators ranged at equal distances. … In the centre of the roof of the principal avenue a turret and clock have been placed. … The chief entrance to the market is by two gates, for wagons, &c., in Stonecutter Street, which has been made double its former width, and two smaller ones for footpassengers; besides these, on each side of the quadrangle, massive oak doors are to be thrown open, from morning till the close of public business."

The market was not successful, and at a meeting of the Court of Common Council, on 29 June 1874, the takings were described as not averaging more than £225 per annum over the preceding five years. The market required improvement and its approach was along the steep sides of the Holborn valley – the former location of the River Fleet. The market also faced stiff competition from Borough Market and Covent Garden. The Corporation decided that the market would be relocated to a new fruit and vegetable hall at nearby Smithfield between 1879 and 1883.

Henry Mayhew visited the market one November morning. The poor, he says, were there, in every style of rags, laying in the necessary stock for their trade [of selling watercress in the streets]. "As the morning twilight drew on, the paved court was crowded with customers. The sheds and shops at the end of the market grew every moment more distinct, and a railway van, laden with carrots, came rumbling into the yard. The pigeons, too, began to fly into the sheds, or walk about the paving-stones, and the gas-man came round with his ladder to turn out the lamps. Then every one was pushing about, the children crying as their naked feet were trodden upon, and the women hurrying off with their baskets or shawls filled with cresses, and the bunch of rushes in their hands. In one corner of the market, busily tying up their bunches, were three or four girls, seated on the stones, with their legs curled up under them, and the ground near them was green with the leaves they had thrown away. A saleswoman, seeing me looking at the group, said, 'Ah, you should come here of a summer's morning, and then you'd see 'em, sitting tying up, young and old, upwards of a hundred poor things, as thick as crows in a ploughed field.'"
