= Market Place, Finchley =

Street in Finchley, London

Coordinates: 51°35′25″N 0°09′59″W

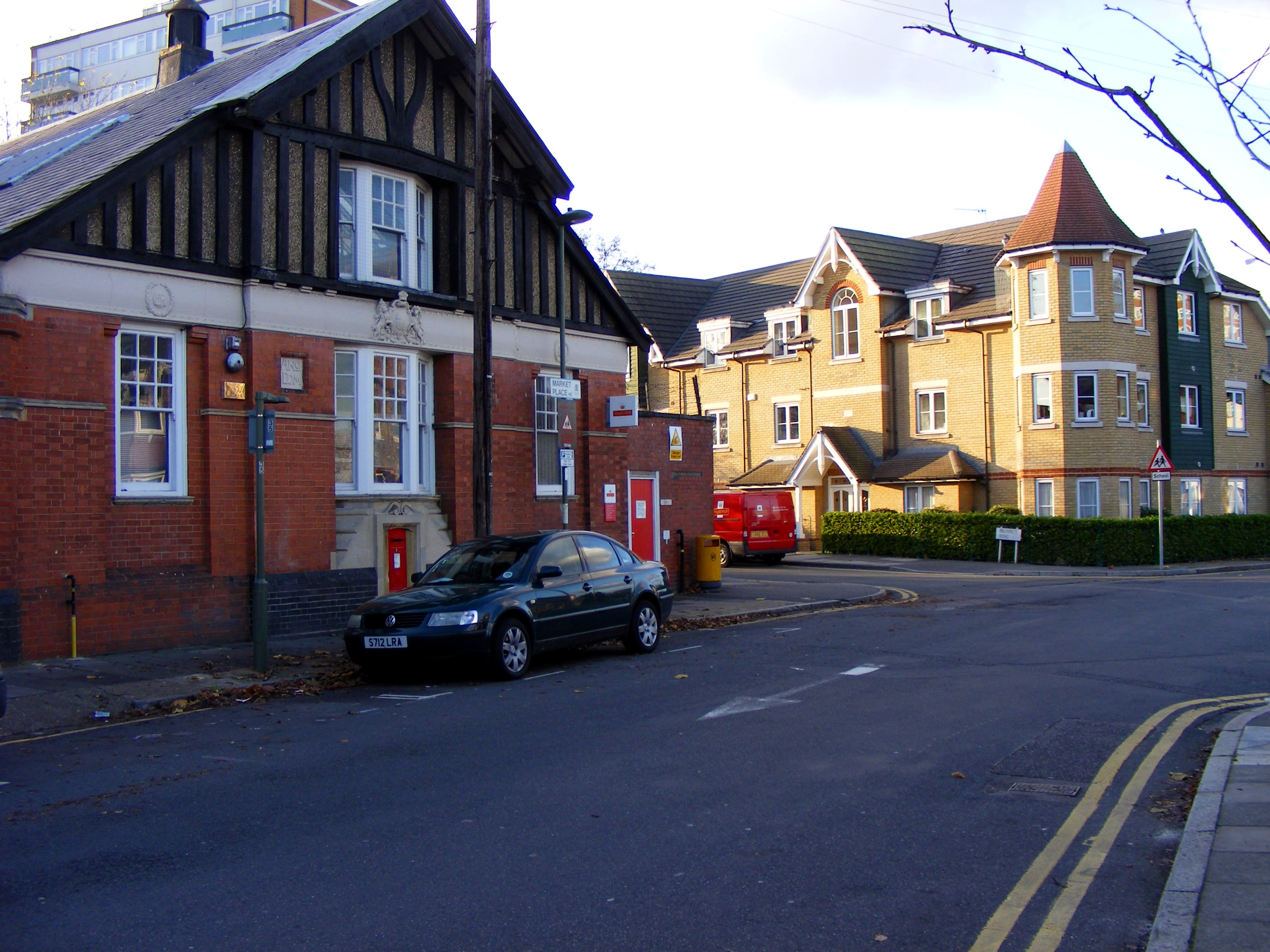
The sorting office on Market Place

Market Place is a road in Finchley, north London.

It was the site of the largest pig market in Middlesex, founded in the late 17th Century. Pigs would be fattened on grain left over from London's gin distilleries before being sold on to London butchers. In the 19th Century the market declined in importance and was only held once a week, and towards the end of the century was reduced to occasional auctions.

From the earliest days, the market had a reputation for squalor and immorality. The notorious highwayman and burglar Jack Sheppard was held at the George Inn on Market Place following his fourth arrest whilst disguised as a butcher. Following heavy bombing during World War II the market was extensively rebuilt, with most of the shops closing. The last shops closed on the street in 1973, and the last commercial premises remaining, a pub, the Duke of Cambridge, closed and was torn down in 2009. However, the area maintained its association with pig farming well into the 20th Century, with a herd of 25 pigs kept on nearby Prospect Place as late as 1955. No trace of the market now exists other than the road name.
