= Fleet Market =

Former market in London

Coordinates: 51°30′58″N 0°6′18″W

Fleet Market Act 1824
- Act of Parliament
- Parliament of the United Kingdom
- Long title: An Act for the Removal of Fleet Market in the City of London.
- Citation: 5 Geo. 4. c. cli

Dates
- Royal assent: 21 June 1824

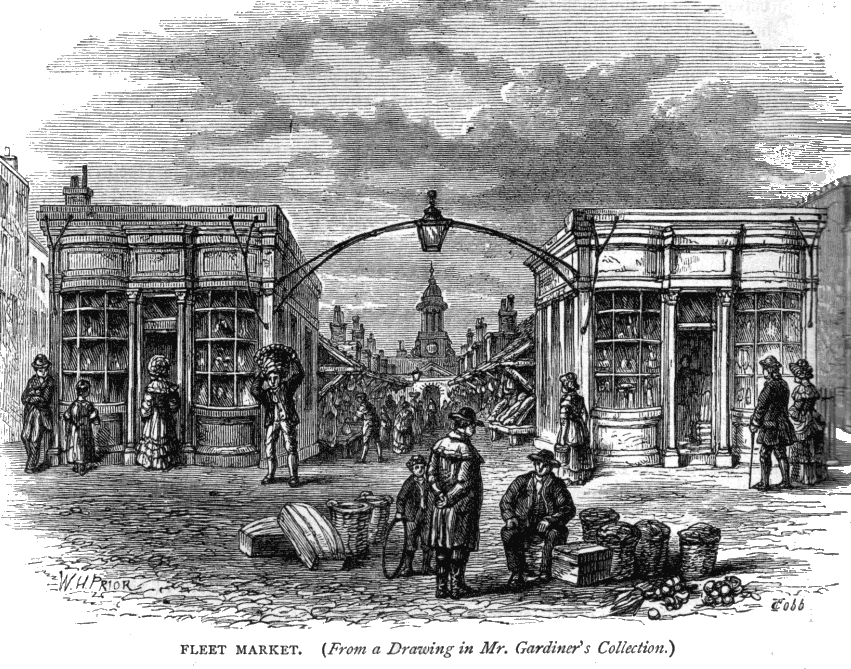
Illustration of Fleet Market by William Henry Prior

The Fleet Market was a London market erected in 1736 on the newly culverted River Fleet. The market was located approximately where the modern Farringdon Street stands today, to the west of the Smithfield livestock market.

The enclosure of the River Fleet, from Fleet Street to Holborn, was allowed by an Act of Parliament in 1733.

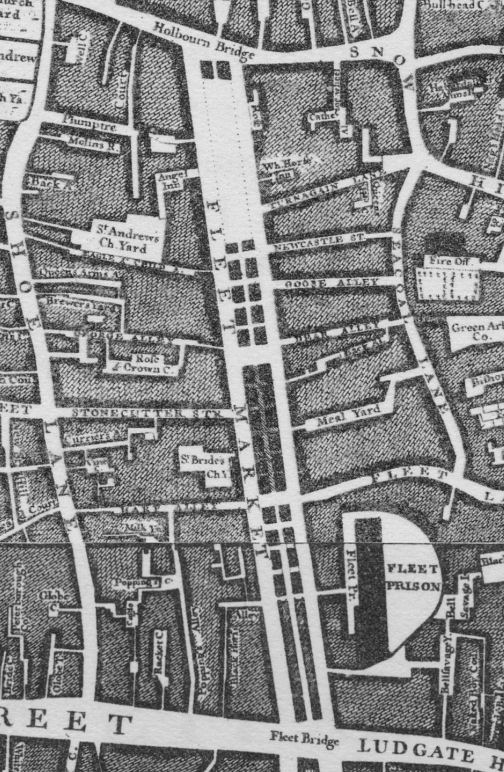
Fleet Market, circa 1746 – detail from Rocque's Map of London

Work began in 1734 to arch over the River Fleet, as it had become an open sewer, and to remove the considerable expense of clearing the river of rubbish and filth. The course of the river was covered between Holborn Bridge and Fleet Bridge (now Ludgate Circus). The market, consisting of two rows of open one-storey shops linked by a covered walkway, opened on 30 September 1737. The market replaced the Old Stocks Market that itself had been cleared for the construction of the Mansion House.

To the north of the market, vegetables were sold in an open-air market. The centre was marked by a clock tower; and the south was adjacent to the Fleet Prison.

By 1829, the market was dilapidated and considered an obstacle to the increasing volume of traffic, leading to its clearance for the construction of Farringdon Road. Farringdon Market was constructed to replace it, but, apart from being the main market for seasonal watercress, was never successful.
