= Antique shop =

Retail store specializing in the selling of antiques

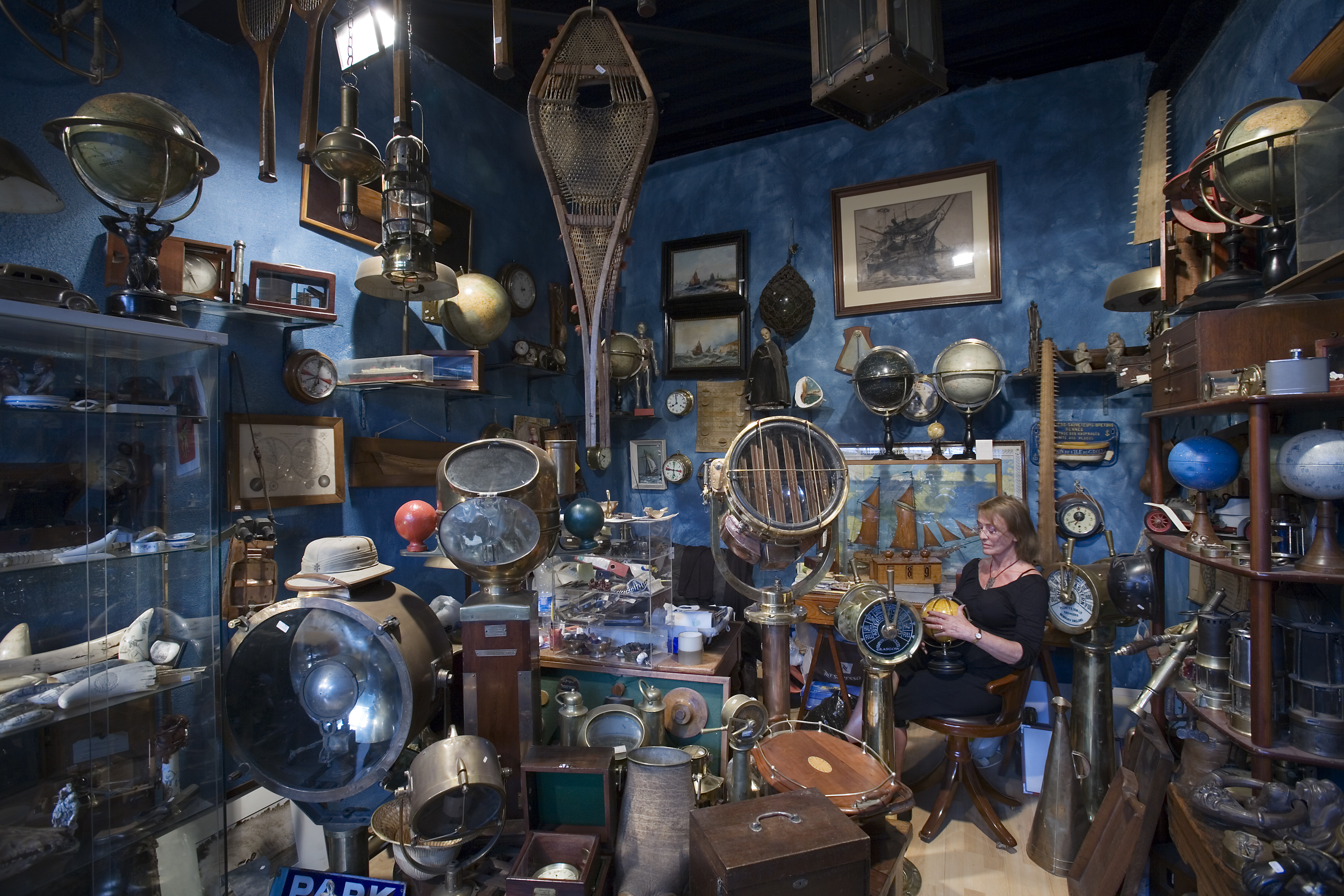
A vintage travel gear seller at Marché Dauphine, part of the Saint-Ouen flea market in Paris

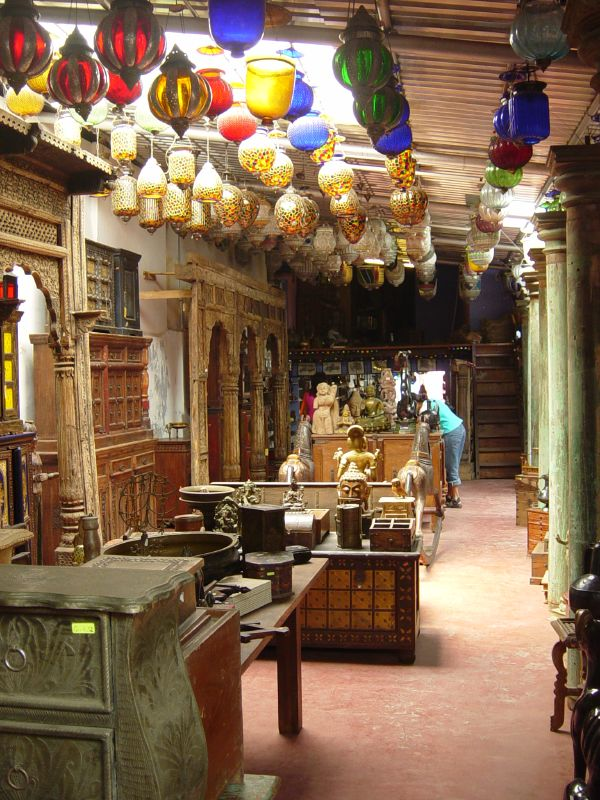
Interior of an antique shop in Kochi, India

An antique shop or antiques shop is a retail store specializing in the selling of antiques. Antiques shops generally have a physical presence in a shop where the wares are stored and displayed, but some antique shops are online, without a physical retail location.

Some antiques shops are located within an antique mall or "antiques market", where each seller can open a booth or stall and display their items for sale. These mini-malls may be a form of consignment shop.

Usually stores' stock is sourced from auctions, estate sales, flea markets, garage sales, etc. Many items may pass through multiple antiques dealers along the product chain before arriving in a retail antiques shop. By their very nature, these shops sell unique items and are typically willing to buy items, even from individuals. The quality of these items may vary from very low to extremely high and expensive, depending on the nature and location of the shop.

Frequently, many antique shops will be clustered together in nearby locations; in the same town such as in many places in New England, or on the same street such as Portobello Road or Camden in London, or in an antique mall.

Antiques shops may specialize in some particular segment of the market such as antique furniture or jewelry, but many shops stock a wide variety of inventory.

== See also ==
- Bric-à-brac
- Junk shop
