= Siege of Sidney Street =

1911 gunfight in the East End of London

Coordinates: 51°31′06″N 00°03′19″W

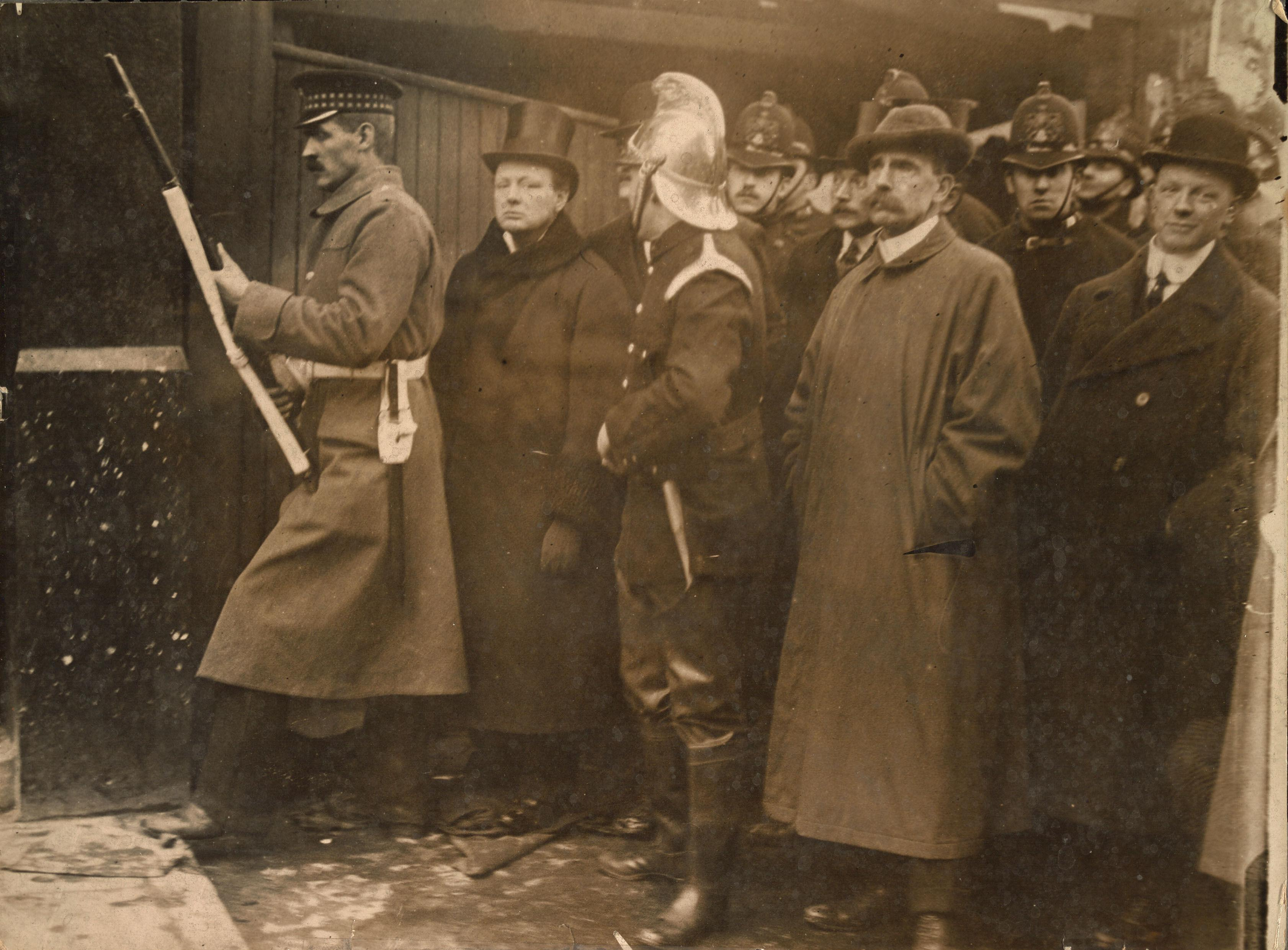
Winston Churchill (second from left), the then Home Secretary, at the siege

The siege of Sidney Street of January 1911, also known as the Battle of Stepney, was a gunfight in the East End of London between a combined police and army force and two Latvian revolutionaries. The siege was the culmination of a series of events that began in December 1910, with an attempted jewellery robbery at Houndsditch in the City of London by a gang of Latvian immigrants which resulted in the murder of three policemen, the wounding of two others, and the death of George Gardstein, a key member of the Latvian gang.

An investigation by the Metropolitan and City of London Police forces identified Gardstein's accomplices, most of whom were arrested within two weeks. The police were informed that the last two members of the gang were hiding at 100 Sidney Street in Stepney. The police evacuated local residents, and on the morning of 3 January a firefight broke out. Armed with inferior weapons, the police sought assistance from the army. The siege lasted for about six hours. Towards the end of the stand-off, the building caught fire; no single cause has been identified. One of the agitators in the building was shot before the fire spread. While the London Fire Brigade were damping down the ruins—in which they found the two bodies—the building collapsed, killing a fireman.

The siege marked the first time the police had requested military assistance in London to deal with an armed stand-off. It was also the first siege in Britain to be caught on camera, as the events were filmed by Pathé News. Some of the footage included images of the Home Secretary, Winston Churchill. His presence caused a political row over the level of his operational involvement. At the trial in May 1911 of those arrested for the Houndsditch jewellery robbery, all but one of the accused were acquitted; the conviction was overturned on appeal. The events were fictionalised in film—in The Man Who Knew Too Much (1934) and The Siege of Sidney Street (1960)—and novels. On the centenary of the events two tower blocks in Sidney Street were named after Peter the Painter, one of the minor members of the gang who was probably not present at either Houndsditch or Sidney Street. The murdered policemen and the fireman who died are commemorated with memorial plaques.

== Background ==
=== Immigration and demographics in London ===
1900 map of Jewish East London. Circled on the left of the map is the location of the Houndsditch murders; circled on the right is the location of 100 Sidney Street. The map is coloured to show the density of Jewish residents in East London: the darker the blue, the higher the Jewish population. (Note: The map's legend reads: "Proportion of Jews indicated.; Dark blue: 95% to 100%; Mid blue: 75% and less than 95%; Light blue: 50% and less than 75%; Light red: 25% and less than 50%; Mid red: 5% and less than 25%; Dark red: Less than 5% of Jews")

In the 19th century, the Russian Empire was home to about five million Jews, the largest Jewish community at the time. Subjected to religious persecution and violent pogroms, many emigrated and between 1875 and 1914 around 120,000 arrived in the United Kingdom, mostly in England. The influx reached its peak in the late 1890s when large numbers of Jewish immigrants—mostly poor and semi-skilled or unskilled—settled in the East End of London. The concentration of Jewish immigrants into some areas was almost 100 per cent of the population, and a study undertaken in 1900 showed that Houndsditch and Whitechapel were both identified as a "well-defined intensely Jewish district".

Some of the expatriates were revolutionaries, many of whom were unable to adapt to life in the politically less oppressive London. The social historian William J. Fishman writes that "the meschuggena (crazy) Anarchists were almost accepted as part of the East End landscape"; the terms "socialist" and "anarchist" had been conflated in the British press, who used the terms interchangeably to refer to those with revolutionary beliefs. A leading article in The Times described the Whitechapel area as one that "harbours some of the worst alien anarchists and criminals who seek our too hospitable shore. And these are the men who use the pistol and the knife."

From the turn of the century, gang warfare persisted in the Whitechapel and Aldgate areas of London between groups of Bessarabians and refugees from Odessa; various revolutionary factions were active in the area. The Tottenham Outrage of January 1909, by two revolutionary Russians in London—Paul Helfeld and Jacob Lepidus—was an attempt to rob a payroll van, which left two dead and twenty injured. The event used a tactic often employed by revolutionary groups in Russia: the expropriation or theft of private property to fund radical activities.

The influx of émigrés and the increase of violent crime associated with it, led to popular concerns and comments in the press. The government passed the Aliens Act 1905 in an attempt to reduce immigration. The popular press reflected the opinions of many at the time; a leading article in The Manchester Evening Chronicle supported the bill to bar "the dirty, destitute, diseased, verminous and criminal foreigner who dumps himself on our soil". The journalist Robert Winder, in his examination of migration into Britain, opines that the Act "gave official sanction to xenophobic reflexes which might ... have remained dormant".

=== Latvian émigré gang ===
Two members of the émigré group involved in the robberies

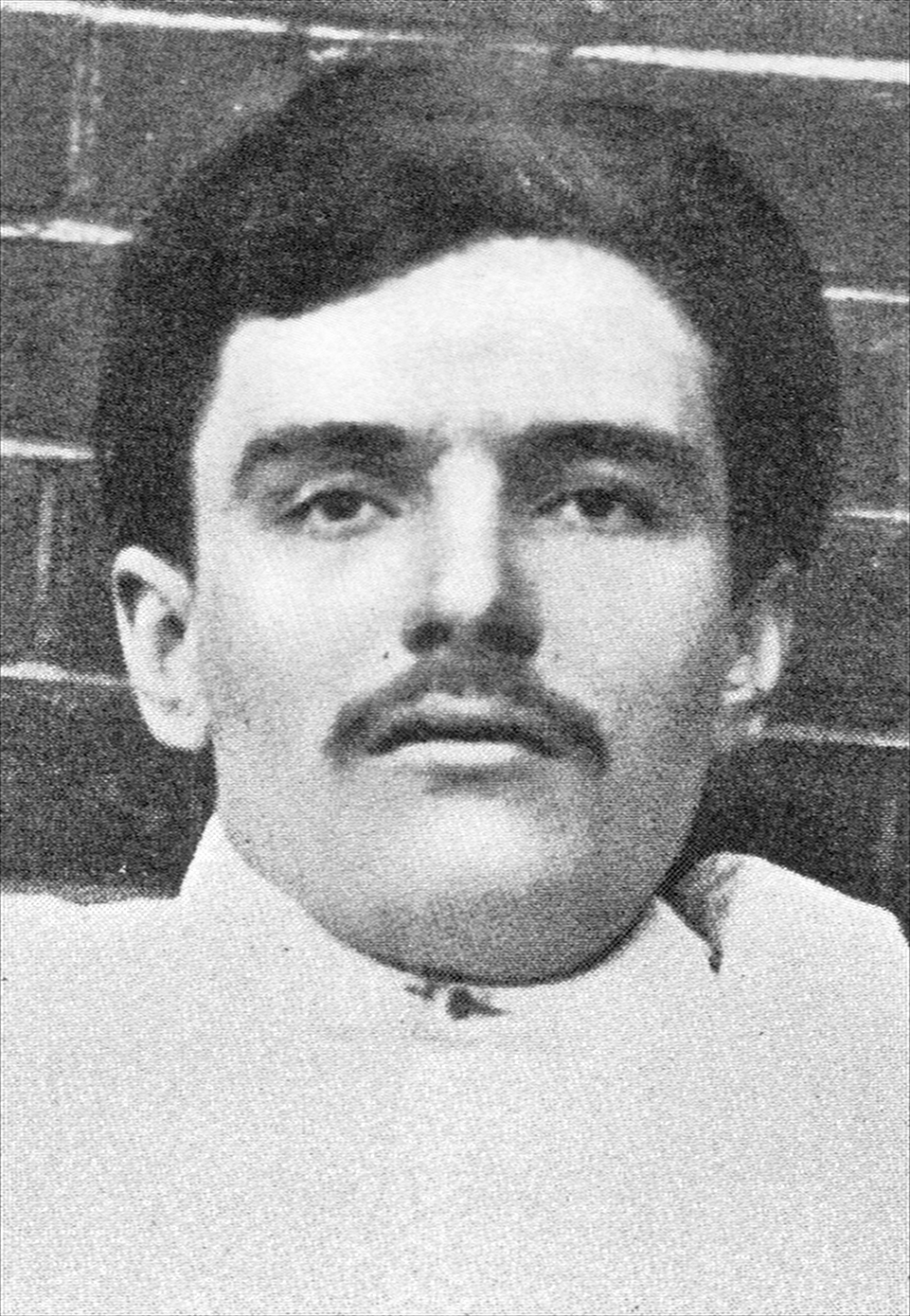
George Gardstein; the photograph was taken post-mortem and issued by the police in their search for information

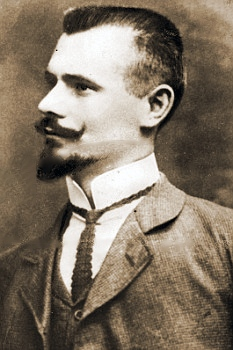
Peter the Painter, as he appeared on the wanted poster issued by the City of London Police

By 1910 Russian émigrés met regularly at the Anarchist Club in Jubilee Street, Stepney. Many of its members were not anarchists, and the club became a meeting and social venue for the Russian émigré diaspora, most of whom were Jewish. The small group of Latvians (Note: At the time Latvia was part of the Russian Empire.) who became involved in the events at Houndsditch and Sidney Street were not all anarchists—although anarchist literature was later found among their possessions. Most members of the group were revolutionaries who had been radicalised by their involvement in the unsuccessful 1905 revolution in Latvia and its violent suppression. All had left-wing political views and believed the expropriation of private property was a valid practice.

A leading figure in the group was George Gardstein, whose real name was probably Hartmanis; he also used the aliases Garstin, Poloski, Poolka, Morountzeff, Mourimitz, Maurivitz, Milowitz, Morintz, Morin and Levi. Gardstein, who probably was an anarchist, had been accused of murder and acts of terrorism in Warsaw in 1905 before his arrival in London. Another member of the group, Jacob (or Yakov) Peters, had been an agitator in Russia while in the army and later as a dockyard worker. He had served a term in prison for his activities and had been tortured by the removal of his fingernails. Yourka Dubof was another Russian agitator who had fled to England after being flogged by Cossacks. Fritz Svaars (Fricis Svars) was a Latvian who had been arrested by the Russian authorities three times for terrorist offences, but escaped each time. He had travelled through the United States, where he undertook a series of robberies, before arriving in London in June 1910.

Another member was "Peter the Painter", a nickname for a man also known as Peter Piaktow (or Piatkov, Pjatkov or Piaktoff); his real name was Janis Zaklis. (Note: He used several other aliases, including Schtern, Straume, Makharov and Dudkin.) The police suggested he was the ringleader of the gang, although there is no evidence that he was present at Houndsditch or Sidney Street. William (or Joseph) Sokoloff (or Sokolow) was a Latvian who had lived in Latvia and had been arrested in Riga in 1905 for murder and robbery before travelling to London. Another of the group's members was Karl Hoffman—whose real name was Alfred Dzircol—who had been involved in revolutionary and criminal activities for several years, including gun-running. In London he had worked as a decorator. John Rosen—real name John Zelin or Tzelin—came to London in 1909 from Riga and worked as a barber, while another member of the gang was Max Smoller, also known as Joe Levi and "Josepf the Jew". He was wanted in his native Crimea for several jewel robberies. Three women members of the gang, or associates of members of the gang, were among those who faced charges arising from the Houndsditch robbery attempt: Nina Vassileva—who was convicted of a minor offence but was cleared on appeal—Luba Milstein and Rosa Trassjonsky.

=== Policing in the capital ===
Location of Houndsditch and Sidney Street

Following the Metropolitan Police Act 1829 and the City of London Police Act 1839, the capital was policed by two forces, the Metropolitan Police, who held sway over most of the capital, and the City of London Police, who were responsible for policing within the historic City boundaries. The events in Houndsditch in December 1910 fell into the purview of the City of London service, and the subsequent actions at Sidney Street in January 1911 were in the jurisdiction of the Metropolitan force. Both services came under the political control of the Home Secretary, who in 1911 was the 36-year-old rising politician Winston Churchill.

While on the beat, or in the course of their normal duties, the officers of the City of London and Metropolitan forces were provided with a short wooden truncheon for protection. When they faced armed opponents—as was the case in Sidney Street—the police were issued with Webley and Bull Dog revolvers, shotguns and small-bore rifles fitted with .22 Morris-tube barrels, the last of which were more commonly used on small indoor shooting galleries.

== Houndsditch murders, December 1910 ==
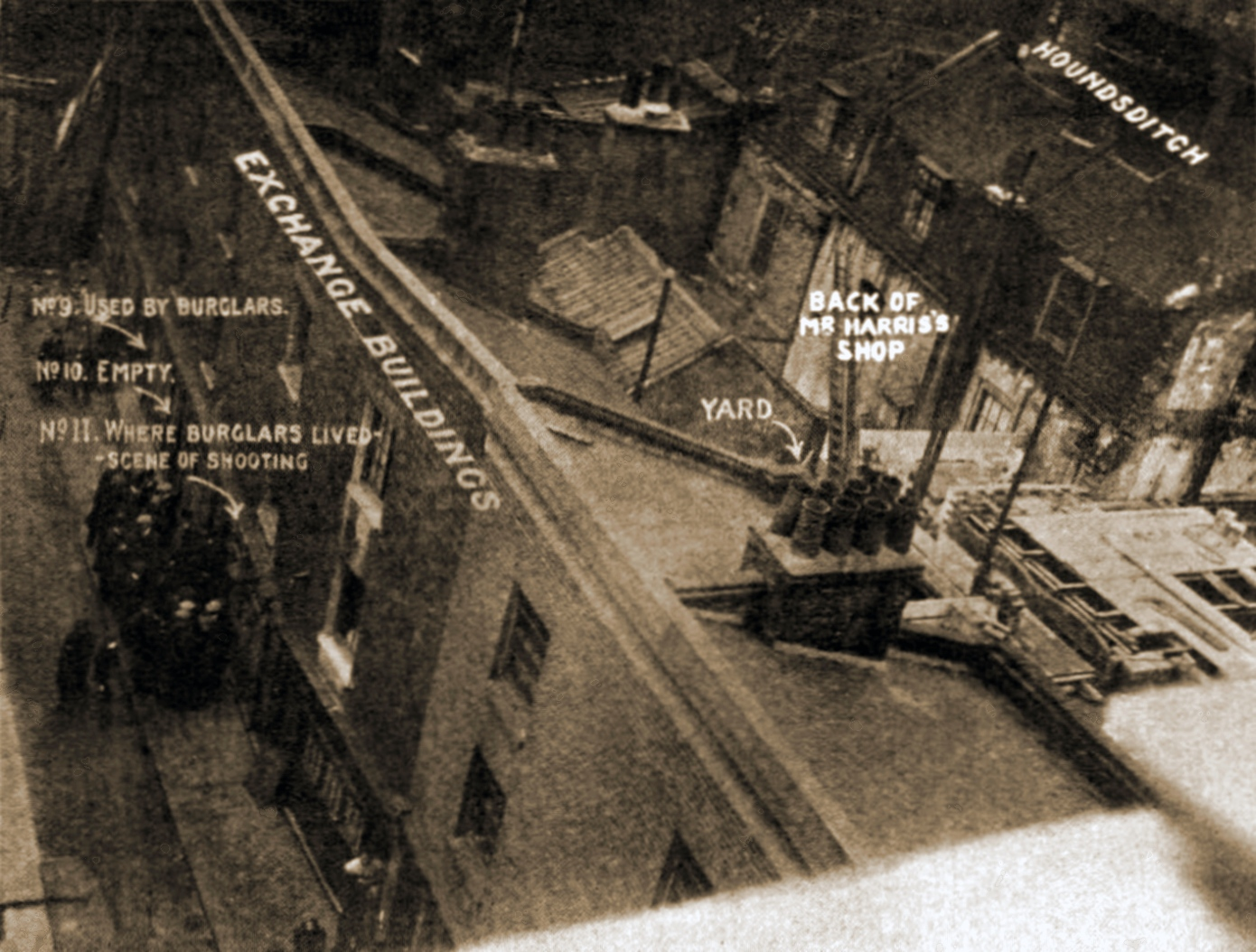
Scene of the robbery, showing a group of policemen in Exchange Buildings, which backs onto the Houndsditch frontage of the shop

At the beginning of December 1910 Smoller, using the name Joe Levi, visited Exchange Buildings, a small cul-de-sac that backed onto the properties of Houndsditch. He rented No. 11 Exchange Buildings; a week later Svaars rented number 9 for a month, saying he needed it for storage. The gang were unable to rent number 10, which was directly behind their target, 119 Houndsditch, the jeweller's shop owned by Henry Samuel Harris. The safe in the jeweller's was reputed to contain between £20,000 and £30,000 worth of jewellery; Harris's son later stated the total was only around £7,000. Over the next two weeks the gang brought in various pieces of necessary equipment, including a 60 foot (18 m) length of India rubber gas hose, a cylinder of compressed gas and a selection of tools, including diamond-tipped drills. Some of this equipment had been obtained from the Italian anarchist exile Errico Malatesta, who had a workshop in Islington; he was not aware it was for use in a robbery.

With the exception of Gardstein, the identities of the gang members present in Houndsditch on the night of 16 December 1910 have never been confirmed. It is likely that as well as Gardstein, Fritz Svaars and William Sokoloff—the two gunmen who died in the Sidney Street siege—were present, along with Max Smoller and Nina Vassileva. Bernard Porter, writing in the Dictionary of National Biography, considers that Peter the Painter was not at the property that night. Donald Rumbelow, a former policeman who wrote a history of the events, takes a different view. He considers that those present consisted of Gardstein, Smoller, Peters and Dubof, with a second group in case the work needed to continue into the following day, which included among their number Sokolow and Svaars. Rumbelow considers a third group on standby, staying at Hoffman's lodgings, to have comprised Hoffman, Rosen and Osip Federoff, an unemployed locksmith. Rumbelow also considers that present at the events—either as lookouts or in unknown capacities—were Peter the Painter and Nina Vassilleva.

On 16 December, working from the small yard behind 11 Exchange Buildings, the gang began to break through the back wall of the shop; number 10 had been unoccupied since 12 December. (Note: Number 10 had been rented by Michail Silisteanu, a Romanian businessman who had offices at the nearby 73 St Mary Axe. To advertise a game he had patented, Silisteanu hired girls to play it in the window of his office; the ensuing crowd of onlookers blocked the pavement and the police made him stop the demonstration. Disgusted by his treatment, Silisteanu left for Paris on 12 December.) At around 10:00 that evening, returning to his home at 120 Houndsditch, Max Weil heard curious noises coming from his neighbour's property. (Note: The break-in took place on the Jewish Sabbath, which meant the streets were quieter than normal, and the noise created by the gang was more noticeable.) Outside his house Weil found Police Constable Piper on his beat and informed him of the noises. Piper checked at 118 and 121 Houndsditch, where he could hear the noise, which he thought was unusual enough to investigate further. At 11:00 he knocked at the door of 11 Exchange Buildings—the only property with a light on in the back. The door was opened in a furtive manner and Piper became suspicious immediately. So as not to rouse the man's concerns, Piper asked him "is the missus in?" The man answered in broken English that she was out, and the policeman said he would return later.

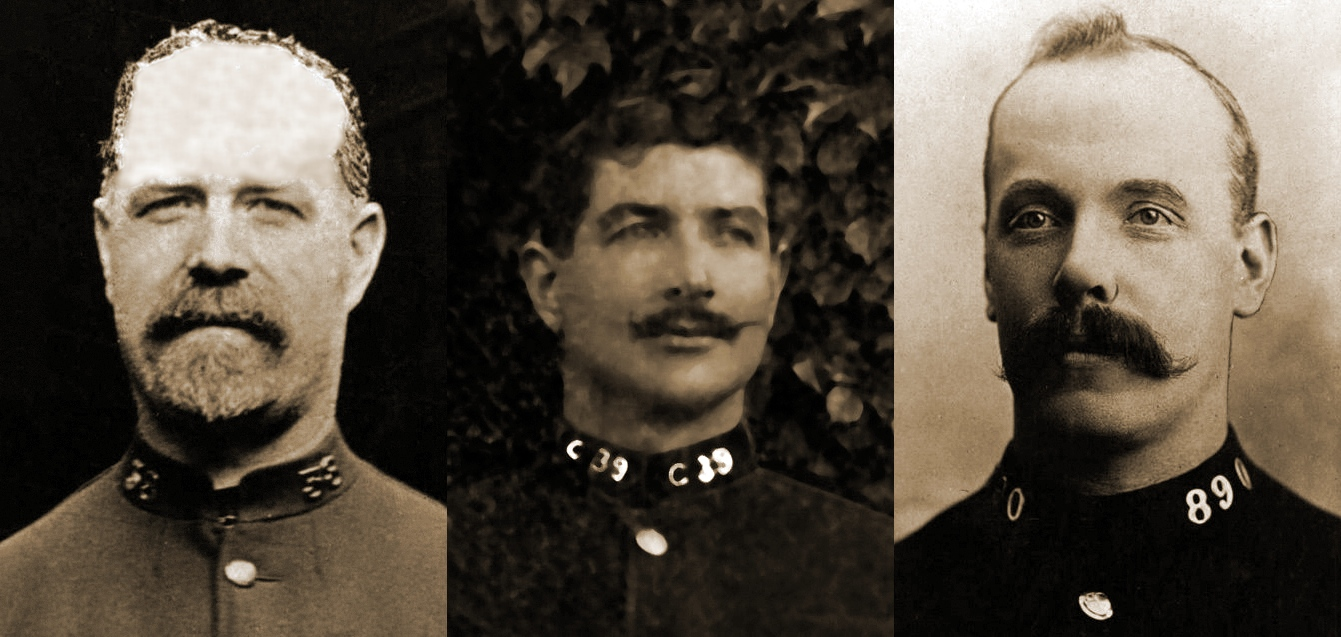
Sergeants Tucker and Bentley and Constable Choate, murdered while on duty on 16 December 1910

Piper reported that as he was leaving Exchange Buildings to return to Houndsditch he saw a man acting suspiciously in the shadows of the cul-de-sac. As the policeman approached him, the man walked away; Piper later described him as being approximately 5 feet 7 inches (1.70 m), pale and fair-haired. When Piper reached Houndsditch he saw two policemen from the adjoining beats—constables Woodhams and Walter Choate—who watched 120 Houndsditch and 11 Exchange Buildings while Piper went to the nearby Bishopsgate Police Station to report. By 11:30 seven uniformed and two plain clothes policemen had gathered in the locality, each armed with his wooden truncheon. Sergeant Robert Bentley from Bishopsgate police station knocked at number 11, unaware that Piper had already done so, which alerted the gang. The door was answered by Gardstein, who made no response when Bentley asked if anyone was working there. Bentley asked him to fetch someone who spoke English; Gardstein left the door half-closed and disappeared inside. Bentley entered the hall with Sergeant Bryant and Constable Woodhams; as they could see the bottom of his trouser legs, they soon realised that someone was watching them from the stairs. The police asked the man if they could step into the back of the property, and he agreed. As Bentley moved forward, the back door opened and one of the gang exited, firing from a pistol as he did so; the man on the stairs also began firing. Bentley was shot in the shoulder and the neck—the second round severing his spine. Bryant was shot in the arm and chest and Woodhams was wounded in the leg, which broke his femur; both collapsed. Although they survived, neither Bryant or Woodhams fully recovered from their injuries.

As the gang exited the property and made to escape up the cul-de-sac, other police intervened. Sergeant Charles Tucker from Bishopsgate police station was hit twice, once in the hip and once in the heart by Peters: he died instantly. Choate grabbed Gardstein and wrestled for his gun, but the Russian managed to shoot him in the leg. Other members of the gang ran to Gardstein's assistance, shooting Choate twelve times in the process, but Gardstein was also wounded; as the policeman collapsed, Gardstein was carried away by his accomplices, who included Peters. As these men, aided by an unknown woman, made their escape with Gardstein they were accosted by Isaac Levy, a passer-by, whom they threatened at pistol-point. He was the only witness to the escape who was able to provide firm details; other witnesses confirmed they saw a group of three men and a woman, and thought one of the men was drunk as he was being helped by his friends. The group went to Svaars' and Peter the Painter's lodgings at 59 Grove Street (now Golding Street), off Commercial Road, where Gardstein was tended by two of the gang's associates, Milstein and Trassjonsky. As they left Gardstein on the bed, Peters left his Dreyse pistol under the mattress, either to make it seem the wounded man was the one who had killed Tucker, or to enable him to defend himself against a possible arrest.

Type of weapons used by the gang

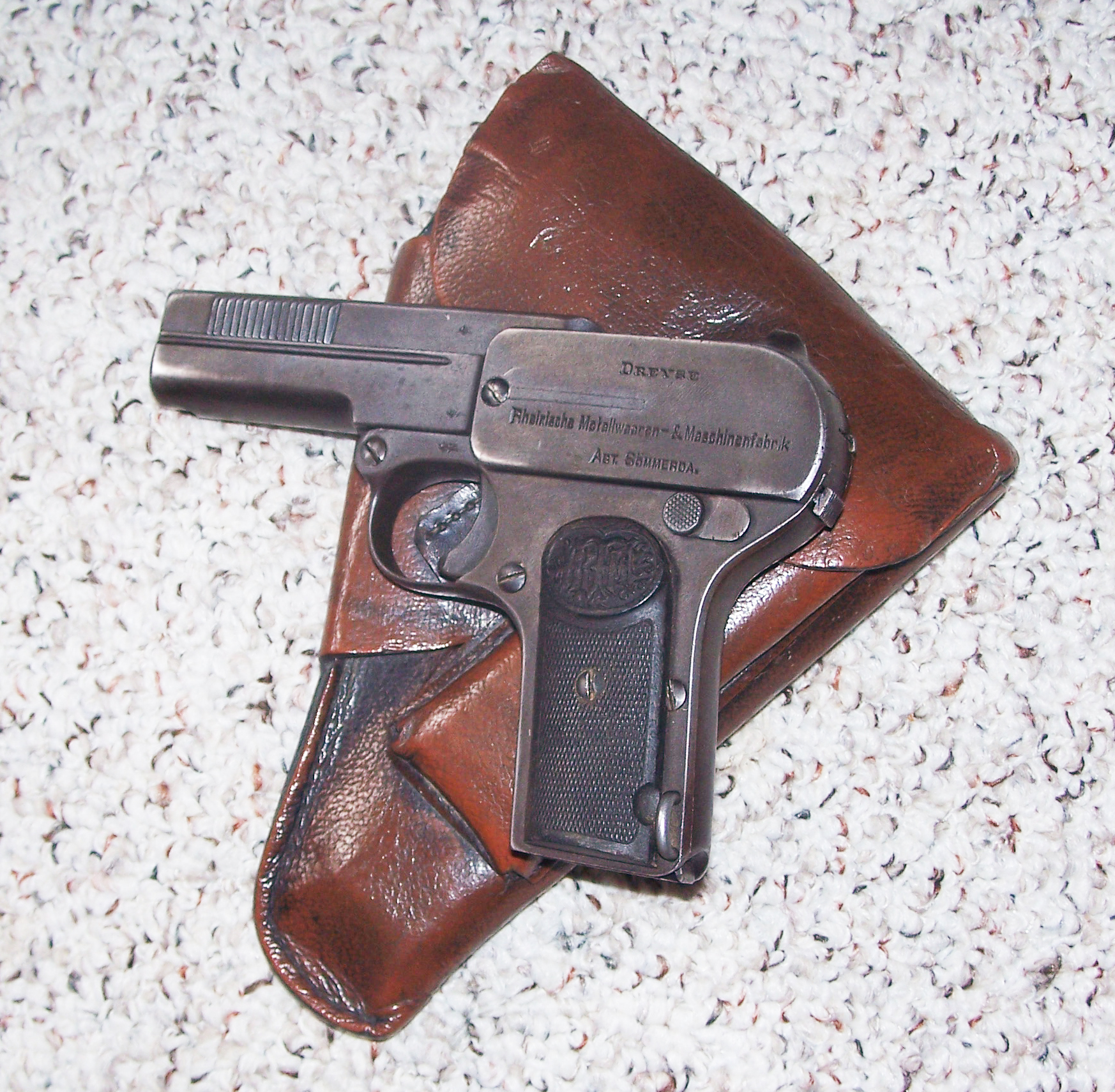
Model 1907 Dreyse pistol

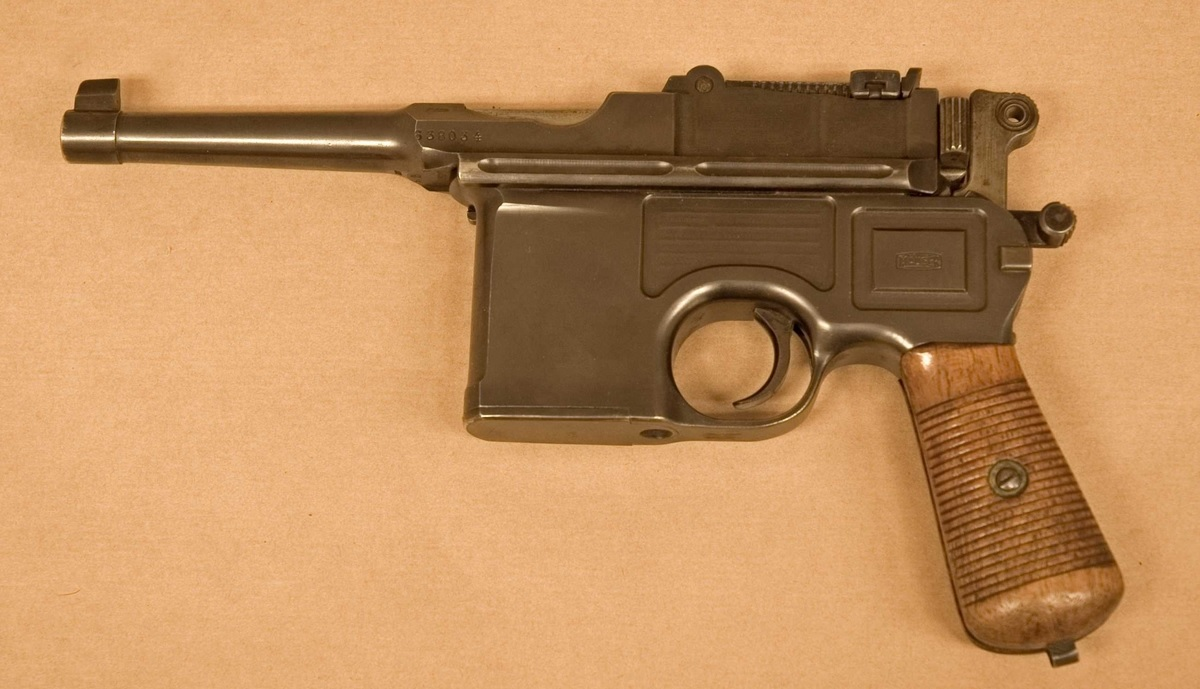
Mauser C96 pistol

Other policemen arrived in Houndsditch, and began to attend to the wounded. Tucker's body was put into a taxi and he was taken to the London Hospital (now the Royal London Hospital) in Whitechapel Road. Choate was also taken there, where he was operated on, but he died at 5:30 am on 17 December. Bentley was taken to St Bartholomew's Hospital. He was half-conscious on arrival, but recovered enough to be able to have a conversation with his pregnant wife and answer questions about the events. At 6:45 pm on 17 December his condition worsened, and he died at 7:30. The killings of Tucker, Bentley and Choate remain one of the largest multiple murders of police officers carried out in Britain in peacetime.

== Investigation, 17 December 1910 – 2 January 1911 ==
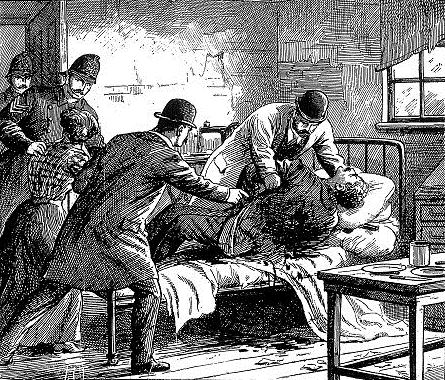
Police finding Gardstein's body, as seen in The Illustrated Police News

The City of London police informed the Metropolitan force, as their protocol demanded, and both services issued revolvers to the detectives involved in the search. The subsequent investigation was challenging for the police because of the cultural differences between the British police and the largely foreign residents of the area covered by the search. The police did not have any Russian, Latvian or Yiddish speakers on the force.

In the early hours of the morning of 17 December Milstein and Trassjonsky became increasingly concerned as Gardstein's condition worsened, and they sent for a local doctor, explaining that their patient had been wounded accidentally by a friend. The doctor thought the bullet was still in the chest—it was later found to be touching the right ventricle of the heart. The doctor wanted to take Gardstein to the London Hospital, but he refused; with no other course open to him, the doctor sold them pain medication and left. The Russian was dead by 9:00 that morning. The doctor returned at 11:00 am and found the body. He had not heard of the events at Exchange Buildings the night before, and so reported the death to the coroner, not the police. At midday the coroner reported the death to the local police who, led by Divisional Detective Inspector Frederick Wensley, went to Grove Street and discovered the corpse. Trassjonsky was in the next room when they entered, and she was soon found by the police, hastily burning papers; she was arrested and taken to the police headquarters at Old Jewry. Many of the papers recovered linked the suspects to the East End, particularly to the anarchist groups active in the area. Wensley, who had extensive knowledge of the Whitechapel area, subsequently acted as a liaison officer to the City of London force throughout the investigation.

Gardstein's body was removed to a local mortuary where his face was cleaned, his hair brushed, his eyes opened and his photograph taken. The picture, and descriptions of those who had helped Gardstein escape from Exchange Buildings, were distributed on posters in English and Russian, asking locals for information. About 90 detectives vigorously searched the East End, spreading details of those they were looking for. A local landlord, Isaac Gordon, reported one of his lodgers, Nina Vassileva, after she had told him she had been one of the people living at Exchange Buildings. Wensley questioned the woman, finding anarchist publications in her rooms, along with a photograph of Gardstein. Information began to come in from the public and the group's associates: on 18 December Federoff was arrested at home, and on 22 December Dubof and Peters were both captured.

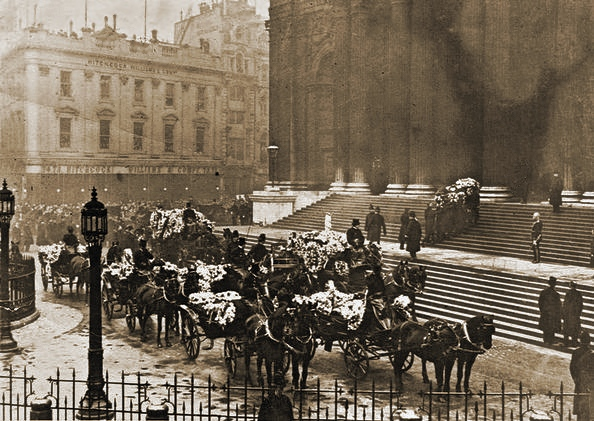
Memorial service St Paul's Cathedral for Tucker, Bentley and Choate, 23 December 1910

On 22 December a public memorial service took place for Tucker, Bentley and Choate at St Paul's Cathedral. King George V was represented by Edward Wallington, his Groom in Waiting; also present were Churchill and the Lord Mayor of London. The crime had shocked Londoners and the service showed evidence of their feelings. An estimated ten thousand people waited in St Paul's environs, and many local businesses closed as a mark of respect; the nearby London Stock Exchange ceased trading for half an hour to allow traders and staff to watch the procession along Threadneedle Street. After the service, when the coffins were being transported on an eight-mile (13 km) journey to the cemeteries, it was estimated that 750,000 people lined the route, many throwing flowers onto the hearses as they passed.

Identity parades were held at Bishopsgate police station on 23 December. Isaac Levy, who had seen the group leaving Exchange Buildings, identified Peters and Dubof as the two he had seen carrying Gardstein. It was also ascertained that Federoff had been witnessed at the events. The following day Federoff, Peters and Dubof all appeared at the Guildhall police court where they were charged with being connected to the murder of the three policemen, and with conspiracy to burgle the jewellery shop. All three pleaded not guilty.

On 27 December the poster bearing Gardstein's picture was seen by his landlord, who alerted police. Wensley and his colleagues visited the lodgings on Gold Street, Stepney and found knives, a gun, ammunition, false passports and revolutionary publications. Two days later there was another hearing at the Guildhall police court. In addition to Federoff, Peters and Dubof, present in the dock were Milstein and Trassjonsky. With some of the defendants having a low standard of English, interpreters were used throughout the proceedings. At the end of the day the case was adjourned until 6 January 1911.

On New Year's Day 1911 the body of Léon Beron, a Russian Jewish immigrant, was found on Clapham Common in South London. He had been badly beaten and two S-shaped cuts, both two inches long, were on his cheeks. The case became connected in the press with the Houndsditch murders and the subsequent events at Sidney Street, although the evidence at the time for the link was scant. The historian F G Clarke, in his history of the events, located information from another Latvian who stated that Beron had been killed not because he was one of the informers who had passed on information, but because he was planning to pass the information on, and the act was a pre-emptive one, designed to scare the locals into not informing on the anarchists. The police believed that the Clapham Common murder was not connected to the Houndsditch police murders.

The posters of Gardstein proved effective, and late on New Year's Day a member of the public came forward to provide information about Svaars and Sokoloff. The informant told police that the men were hiding at 100 Sidney Street, along with a lodger, Betty Gershon, who was Sokoloff's mistress. The informant was persuaded to visit the property the following day to confirm the two men were still present. A meeting took place on the afternoon of 2 January to decide the next steps. Wensley, high-ranking members of the Metropolitan force and Sir William Nott-Bower, the Commissioner of the City Police, were present.

== Events of 3 January ==
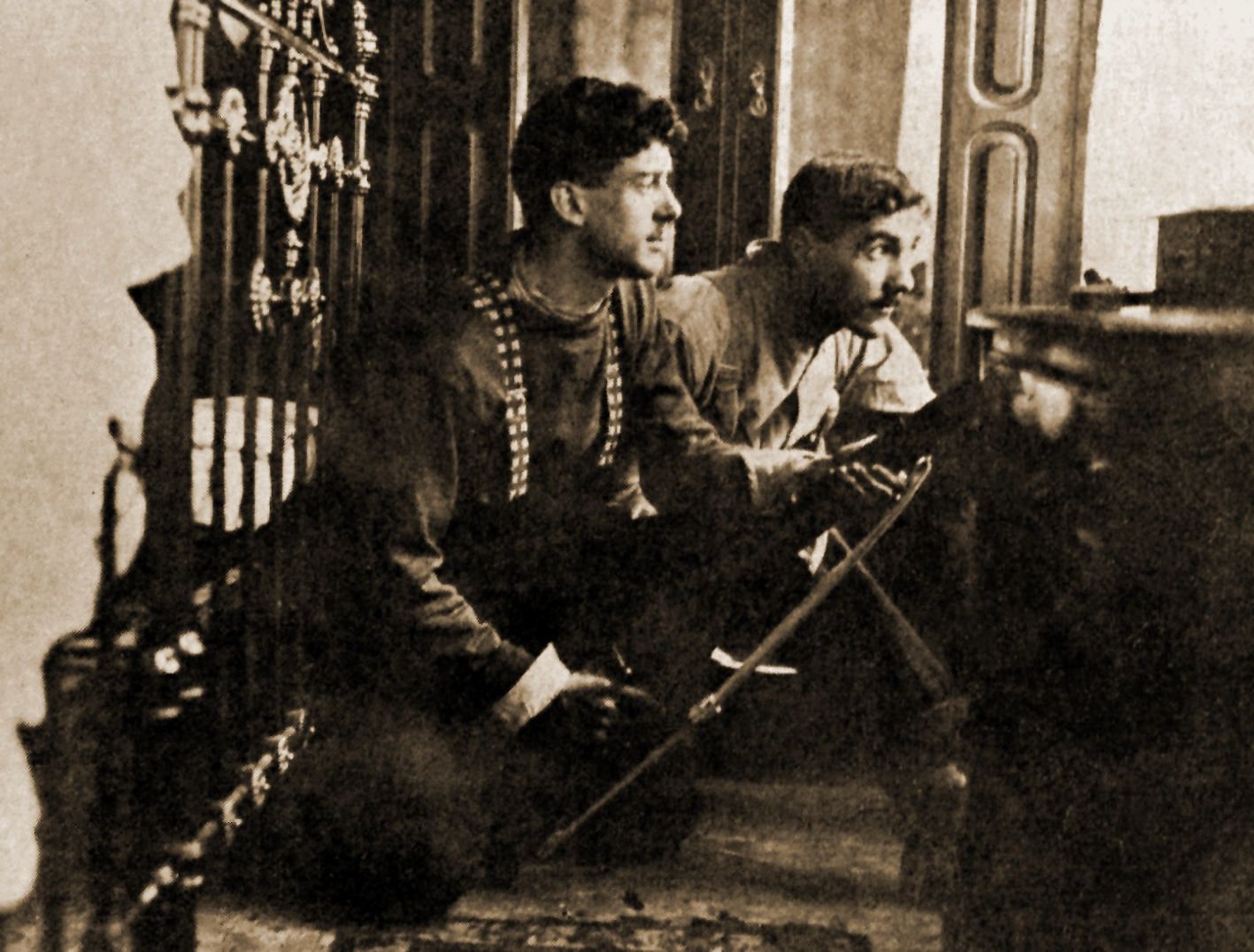
The Illustrated London News caption reads: "Scots Guards on active service in Sidney Street: Two of the men firing from a bedroom opposite the besieged house."

Just after midnight on 3 January, 200 police officers from the City of London and Metropolitan forces cordoned off the area around 100 Sidney Street. Armed officers were placed at number 111, directly opposite number 100, and throughout the night the residents of the houses on the block were roused and evacuated. Wensley woke the ground floor tenants at number 100 and asked them to fetch Gershon, claiming that she was needed by her sick husband. When Gershon appeared she was grabbed by the police and taken to the City of London police headquarters; the ground floor lodgers also evacuated. Number 100 was now empty of all residents, apart from Svaars and Sokoloff, neither of whom seemed to be aware of the evacuation.

The police's operating procedure—and the law which governed their actions—meant they were unable to open fire without being fired upon first. This, along with the structure of the building, which had a narrow, winding stairwell up which police would have to pass, meant any approach to the gang members was too perilous to attempt. It was decided to wait until dawn before taking any action. At about 7:30 am a policeman knocked on the door of number 100, which elicited no response; stones were then thrown at the window to wake the men. Svaars and Sokoloff appeared at the window and opened fire at the police. A police sergeant was wounded in the chest; he was evacuated under fire across the rooftops and taken to the London Hospital. (Note: The police officer—Sergeant Leeson—made a full recovery.) Some members of the police returned fire, but their guns were only effective over shorter ranges, and proved ineffective against the comparatively advanced automatic weapons of Svaars and Sokoloff.

By 9:00 am it was apparent that the two gunmen possessed superior weapons and ample ammunition. The police officers in charge on the scene, Superintendent Mulvaney and Chief Superintendent Stark, contacted Assistant Commissioner Major Frederick Wodehouse at Scotland Yard. He telephoned the Home Office and obtained permission from Churchill to bring in a detachment of Scots Guards, who were stationed at the Tower of London. It was the first time that the police had requested military assistance in London to deal with an armed siege. Twenty-one volunteer marksmen from the Guards arrived at about 10:00 am and took firing positions at each end of the street and in the houses opposite. The shooting continued without either side gaining any advantage.

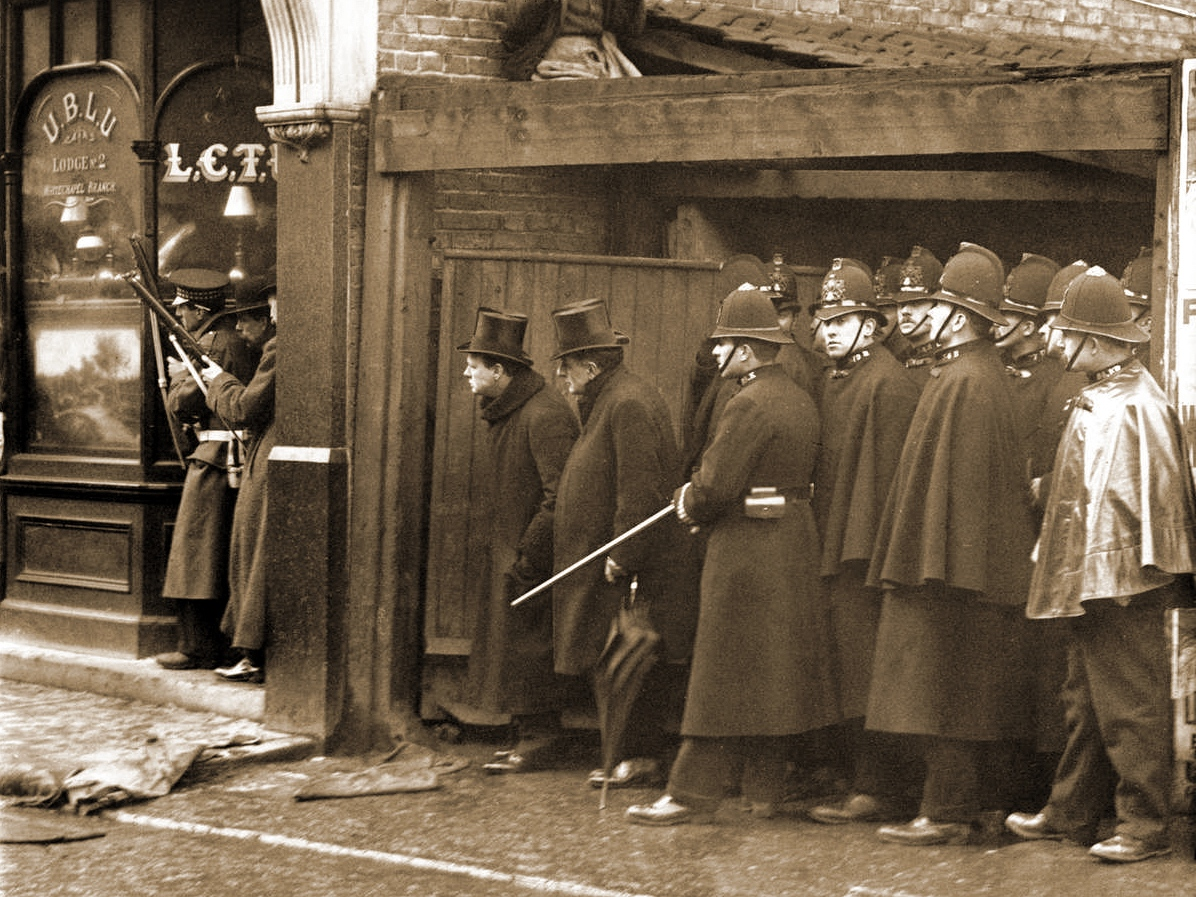
Churchill observing the events at Sidney Street

Churchill arrived on the scene at 11:50 am to observe the incident at first hand; he later reported that he thought the crowd were unwelcoming to him, as he heard people asking "Oo let 'em in?", in reference to the Liberal Party's immigration policy that had allowed the influx from Russia. Churchill's role during the siege is unclear. His biographers, Paul Addison and Roy Jenkins, both consider that he gave no operational commands to the police, but a Metropolitan police history of the event states that the events of Sidney Street were "a very rare case of a Home Secretary taking police operational command decisions". (Note: Subsequent stories that a bullet passed through Churchill's top hat are apocryphal, and no reference to such an occurrence appears in either the official records, or Churchill's accounts of the siege.) In a subsequent letter to The Times, Churchill clarified his role while he was present:

I did not interfere in any way with the dispositions made by the police authorities on the spot. I never overruled those authorities nor overrode them. From beginning to end the police had an absolutely free hand. ... I did not send for the Artillery or the Engineers. I was not consulted as to whether they should be sent for.

Shooting between the two sides reached a peak between 12:00 and 12:30 pm, but at 12:50 smoke was seen coming from the building's chimneys and from the second floor windows; it has not been established how the fire was started, whether by accident or design. The fire slowly spread, and by 1:30 it had taken a firm hold and had spread to the other floors. A second detachment of Scots Guards arrived, bringing with them a Maxim machine gun, which was never used. Horse-drawn artillery field guns were also brought from St John's Wood Barracks, but again not used. Shortly afterwards Sokoloff put his head out of the window; he was shot by one of the soldiers and he fell back inside. The senior officer of the London Fire Brigade present on the scene sought permission to extinguish the blaze, but was refused. He approached Churchill in order to have the decision overturned, but the Home Secretary approved the police decision. Churchill later wrote:

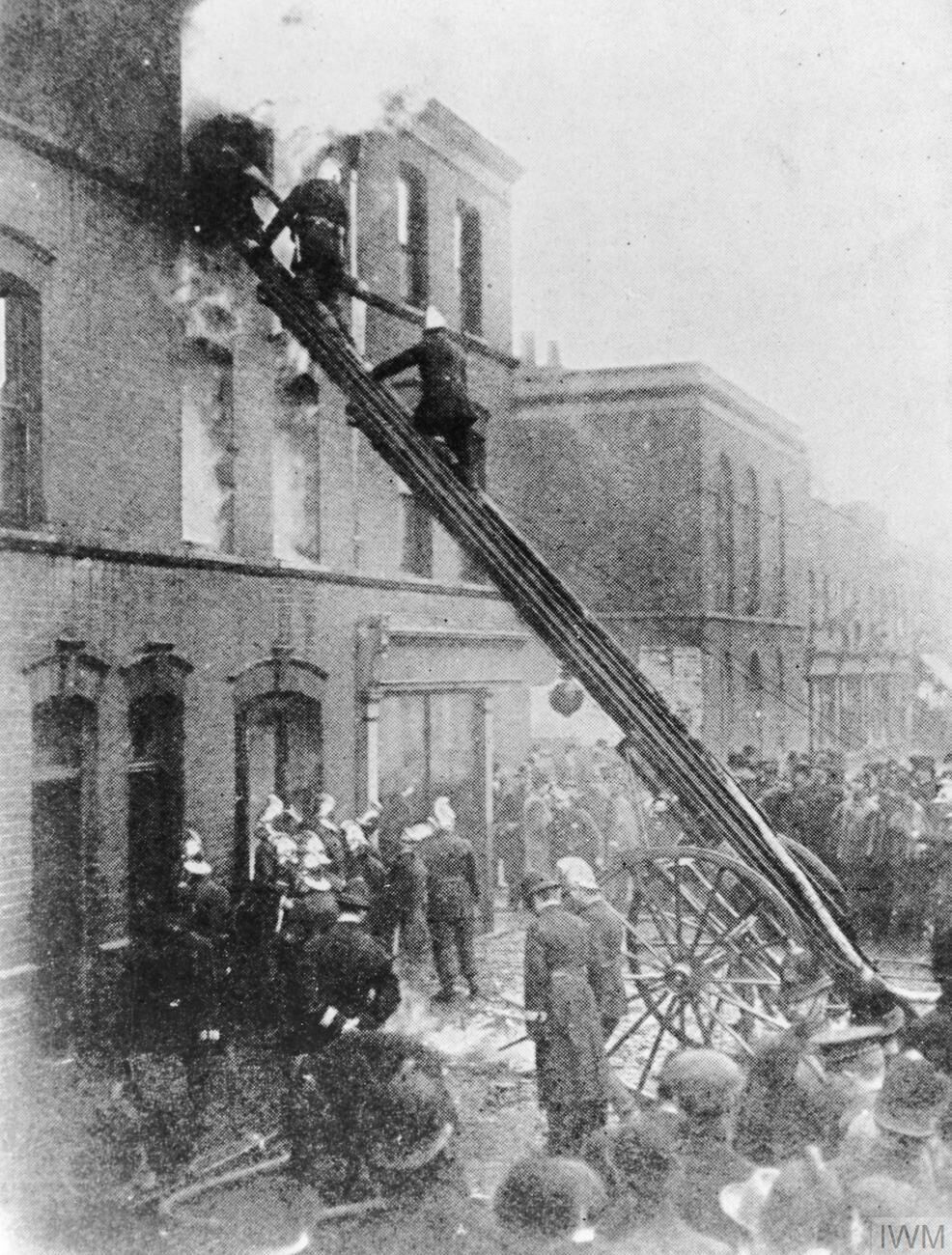
Firemen tackle the fire at 100 Sidney Street after the end of the siege

I now intervened to settle this dispute, at one moment quite heated. I told the fire-brigade officer on my authority as Home Secretary that the house was to be allowed to burn down and that he was to stand by in readiness to prevent the conflagration from spreading.

By 2:30 pm the shooting from the house had ceased. One of the detectives present walked close to the wall and pushed the door open, before retreating. Other police officers, and some of the soldiers, came out and waited for the men to exit. None did, and as part of the roof collapsed, it was clear to onlookers that the men were both dead; the fire brigade was allowed to start extinguishing the fire. At 2:40 Churchill left the scene, at about the time the Royal Horse Artillery arrived with two 13-pounder field artillery pieces. Sokoloff's body was found soon after the firemen entered. A wall collapsed on a group of five firemen, who were all taken to the London Hospital. One of the men, Superintendent Charles Pearson, had a fractured spine; he died six months later. After shoring up the building, the firemen resumed their search; at around 6:30 pm the second body—that of Svaars—was found.

== Aftermath ==
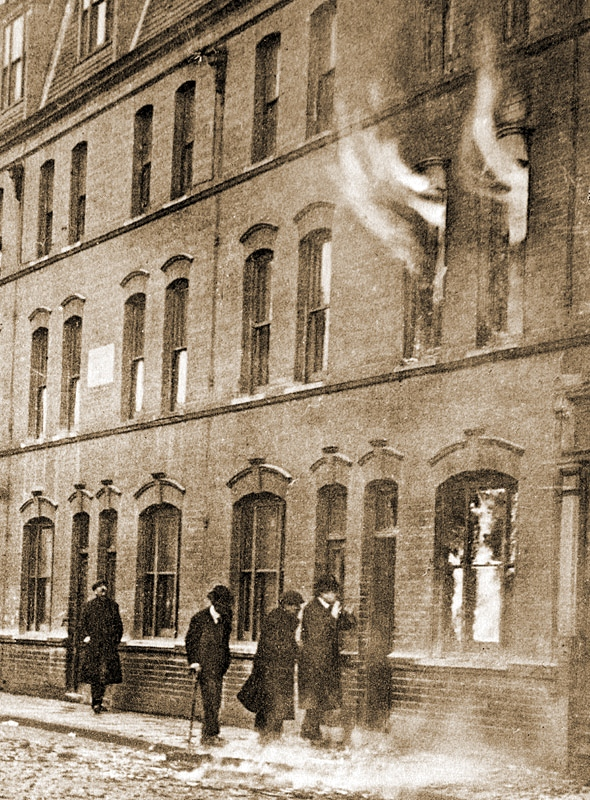
Detectives inspect the house at 100 Sidney Street at the conclusion of the siege

The siege was captured by Pathé News cameras—one of their earliest stories and the first siege to be captured on film—and it included footage of Churchill. When the newsreels were screened in cinemas, Churchill was booed with shouts of "shoot him" from audiences. His presence was controversial to many and the Leader of the Opposition, Arthur Balfour, remarked, "He [Churchill] was, I understand, in military phrase, in what is known as the zone of fire—he and a photographer were both risking valuable lives. I understand what the photographer was doing, but what was the right hon. Gentleman doing? That I neither understood at the time, nor do I understand now." Jenkins suggests that he went simply because "he could not resist going to see the fun himself".

An inquest was held in January into the deaths at Houndsditch and Sidney Street. The jury took fifteen minutes to reach the conclusion that the two bodies located were those of Svaars and Sokoloff, and that Tucker, Bentley and Choate had been murdered by Gardstein and others during the burglary attempt. Rosen was arrested on 2 February at work in Well Street, Hackney, and Hoffman was taken into custody on 15 February. The committal proceedings spread from December 1910—with Milstein and Trassjonsky appearing—to March 1911, and included Hoffman from 15 February. The proceedings consisted of 24 individual hearings. In February Milstein was discharged on the basis that there was insufficient evidence against her; Hoffman, Trassjonsky and Federoff were released in March on the same basis.

The case against the four remaining arrested gang members was heard at the Old Bailey by Mr Justice Grantham in May. Dubof and Peters were accused of Tucker's murder, Dubof, Peters, Rosen and Vassilleva were charged with "feloniously harbouring a felon guilty of murder" and for "conspiring and agreeing together and with others unknown to break and enter the shop of Henry Samuel Harris with intent to steal his goods". The case lasted for eleven days; there were problems with the proceedings because of the language difficulties and the chaotic personal lives of the accused. The case resulted in acquittals for all except Vassileva, who was convicted of conspiracy in the burglary and sentenced to two years' imprisonment; her conviction was overturned on appeal.

After the high levels of criticism aimed at the Aliens Act, Churchill decided to strengthen the legislation, and proposed the Aliens (Prevention of Crime) Bill under the Ten Minute Rule. The MP Josiah C Wedgwood objected, and wrote to Churchill to ask him not to introduce the hard-line measures "You know as well as I do that human life does not matter a rap in comparison with the death of ideas and the betrayal of English traditions." The bill did not become law.

== Legacy ==
Memorials to the members of the police and fire services who were killed.

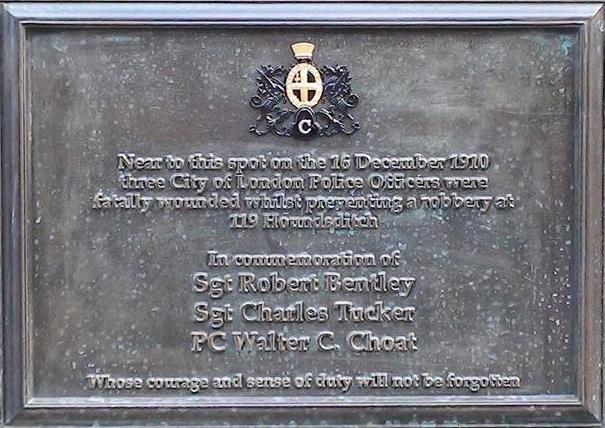
Memorial plaque to the three policemen murdered in Houndsditch

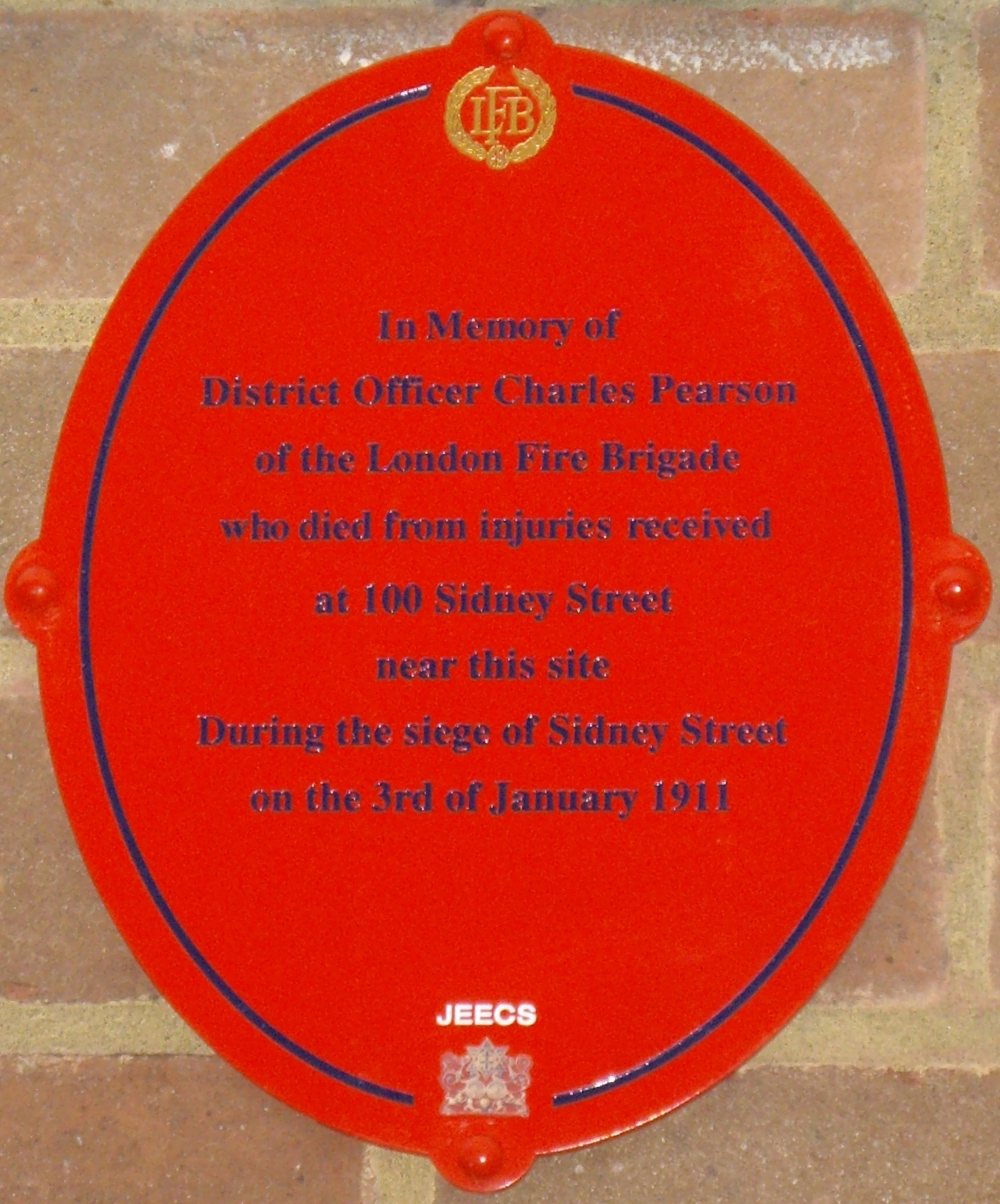
Plaque in Sidney Street to Charles Pearson, the fireman who died from his injuries

Bryant and Woodhams were presented with the King's Police Medal for their bravery; Woodhams was still badly injured and had to be carried to the king on a stretcher for the presentation. Both Bryant and Woodhams were also promoted; as they were being invalided out of the force, the promotions ensured they were paid a higher pension. The Lord Mayor of London presented the King's Police Medal to the families of the three murdered policemen. For each child of the murdered policemen, the City of London Corporation gave five shillings a week until they reached the age of fifteen.

The inadequacy of the police's firepower led to criticism in the press, and on 12 January 1911 several alternative weapons were tested. The trials resulted in the Metropolitan Police replacing the Webley revolver with the Webley & Scott .32 calibre MP semi-automatic pistol later that year; the City of London Police adopted the weapon in 1912.

The members of the group dispersed after the events. Peter the Painter was never seen or heard from again. It was assumed he left the country, and there were several possible sightings in the years afterwards; none were confirmed. Jacob Peters returned to Russia, rose to be deputy head of the Cheka, the Soviet secret police, and was executed in Joseph Stalin's 1938 purge. Trassjonsky had a mental breakdown and was confined for a time at Colney Hatch Lunatic Asylum, where she died in 1971. Dubof and Federoff disappeared from the records; Vassilleva remained in the East End for the remainder of her life and died at Brick Lane in 1963. Hoffman moved to New York where he lived for many years with Luba Milstein, who had given birth to Fritz Svaars' child. Smoller left the country in 1911 and travelled to Paris, after which he disappeared; Milstein later emigrated to the United States.

The siege was the inspiration for the final scene in Alfred Hitchcock's original 1934 version of The Man Who Knew Too Much; the story was heavily fictionalised in the 1960 film The Siege of Sidney Street. The novelist Georges Simenon drew on the story for his 1930 Maigret detective novel The Strange Case of Peter the Lett (Pietr-le-Letton). The siege was also the inspiration for two other novels, The Siege of Sidney Street (1960) by Frederick Oughton and A Death Out of Season (1973) by Emanuel Litvinoff.

In September 2008 Tower Hamlets London Borough Council named two tower blocks in Sidney Street, Peter House and Painter House; Peter the Painter was only involved in a minor capacity in the events and was not present at the siege. The name plaques on the buildings call Peter the Painter an "anti-hero"; the decision angered the Metropolitan Police Federation. A council spokesman said that "There is no evidence that Peter the Painter killed the three policemen, so we knew we were not naming the block after a murderer. ... but he is the name that East Enders associate with the siege and Sidney Street." In December 2010, on the centenary of the events at Houndsditch, a memorial plaque for the three murdered policemen was unveiled near the location. Three weeks later, on the anniversary of the siege, a plaque was unveiled in honour of Pearson, the fireman who died because the building collapsed on him.

== Notes and references ==
=== Sources ===
- Addison, Paul (2014). "Churchill, Sir Winston Leonard Spencer". Oxford Dictionary of National Biography (online ed.). Oxford University Press. doi:10.1093/ref:odnb/32413. (Subscription, Wikipedia Library access or UK public library membership required.)
- Bird, Samantha L. (2010). Stepney: Profile of a London Borough from the Outbreak of the First World War to the Festival of Britain, 1914–1951. Newcastle-upon-Tyne: Cambridge Scholars Publishing. ISBN 978-1-4438-2612-9.
- Bloom, Clive (2013). Victoria's Madmen: Revolution and Alienation. London: Palgrave Macmillan. ISBN 978-1-137-31897-8.
- Burton, Alan (2016). Historical Dictionary of British Spy Fiction. London: Rowman & Littlefield. ISBN 978-1-4422-5587-6.
- Churchill, Winston (1942). Thoughts and Adventures. London: Macmillan. OCLC 1028252.
- Cohen, Steve; Humphries, Beth; Mynott, Ed (2002). From Immigration Controls to Welfare Controls. London: Routledge. ISBN 978-0-415-25083-2.
- Defries, Harry (2014). Conservative Party Attitudes to Jews 1900–1950. London: Routledge. ISBN 978-1-135-28462-6.
- Eddy, J P (1946). The Mystery of 'Peter the Painter'. London: Stevens & Sons. OCLC 844864776.
- Fishman, William J (2004). East End Jewish Radicals 1875–1914. Nottingham: Five Leaves Publications. ISBN 978-0-907123-45-3.
- Gilbert, Martin (2000). Churchill: A Life. London: Pimlico. ISBN 978-0-7126-6725-8.
- Jenkins, Roy (2012). Churchill. London: Pan Macmillan. ISBN 978-0-330-47607-2.
- Keily, Jackie; Hoffbrand, Julia (2015). The Crime Museum Uncovered. London: IB Tauris. ISBN 978-1-78130-041-1.
- Moss, Alan; Skinner, Keith (2015). Scotland Yard's History of Crime in 100 Objects (Kindle ed.). Stroud, Glos: The History Press. ISBN 978-0-7509-6655-9.
- Mulvey, Paul (2010). The Political Life of Josiah C Wedgwood: Land, Liberty and Empire, 1872–1943. Woodbridge, Suffolk: Boydell & Brewer. ISBN 978-0-86193-308-2.
- Palmer, Alan (2004). The East End: Four Centuries of London Life. London: John Murray. ISBN 978-0-7195-6640-0.
- Porter, Bernard (2011). "Piatkoff [Piaktow], Peter [nicknamed Peter the Painter]". Oxford Dictionary of National Biography (online ed.). Oxford University Press. doi:10.1093/ref:odnb/92479. (Subscription, Wikipedia Library access or UK public library membership required.)
- Rogers, Colin (1981). The Battle of Stepney. London: R Hale. ISBN 978-0-7091-9146-9.
- Ruff, Philip (2019). A Towering Flame. The Life and Times of the Elusive Latvian Anarchist Peter the Painter. London: Breviary Stuff. ISBN 978-0-9929466-8-5.
- Rumbelow, Donald (1988). The Houndsditch Murders and the Siege of Sidney Street. London: W H Allen. ISBN 978-0-491-03178-3.
- Russell, Charles; Lewis, H S (1900). The Jew in London. A Study of Racial Character and Present-Day Conditions. London: T Fisher Unwin. OCLC 162217108.
- Stratmann, Linda (2010). Greater London Murders: 33 True Stories of Revenge, Jealousy, Greed & Lust. Stroud, Glos: The History Press. ISBN 978-0-7524-5124-4.
- Taylor, Antony (2012). London's Burning: Pulp Fiction, the Politics of Terrorism and the Destruction of the Capital in British Popular Culture, 1840–2005. London: Bloomsbury Publishing. ISBN 978-1-4411-7156-6.
- Waldren, Mike (August 2012). "Policing and Firearms – Timeline" (PDF). Police Firearms Officers Association. Archived from the original (PDF) on 11 October 2016.
- Waldren, Mike (July 2013). "The Siege of Sidney Street" (PDF). Police Firearms Officers Association. Archived from the original (PDF) on 23 March 2016.
- Wensley, Frederick (2005) [1951]. Forty Years of Scotland Yard: A Record of Lifetime's Service in the Criminal Investigation Department. London: Kessinger Publishing. ISBN 978-1-4179-8997-3.
- Whitehead, Andrew (2024). A Devilish Kind of Courage. Anarchists, Aliens and the Siege of Sidney Street. London: Reaktion. ISBN 978-1-78914-844-2.
- Winder, Robert (2005). Bloody Foreigners. London: Abacus. ISBN 978-0-349-11566-5.
