= Tottenham Outrage =

1909 armed robbery in London

Front page of The Illustrated London News, with Cyrus Cuneo's interpretation of the tram chase

The Tottenham Outrage of 23 January 1909 was an armed robbery in Tottenham, North London, that resulted in a two-hour chase between the police and armed criminals over a distance of six miles (10 km), with an estimated 400 rounds of ammunition fired by the thieves. The robbery, of workers' wages from the Schnurmann rubber factory, was carried out by Paul Helfeld and Jacob Lepidus, Jewish Latvian immigrants. Of the twenty-three casualties, two were fatal and several others serious, among them seven policemen. The two thieves killed themselves at the end of the pursuit.

Helfeld and Lepidus were members of a Latvian socialist party responsible for smuggling revolutionary literature into Russia. Both had been living with Lepidus's brother Paul in Paris in 1907 when Paul was killed by the premature detonation of the bomb he was carrying to assassinate the president of France, Armand Fallières. They fled France to north London, where they became members of a small group of Latvian agitators. For some time before the robbery, Helfeld was employed at the Schnurmann factory.

The bravery of the police during the chase led to the creation of the King's Police Medal, which was awarded to several of those involved in the pursuit. A joint funeral for the two victims—Police Constable William Tyler and Ralph Joscelyne, a ten-year-old boy—was attended by a crowd of up to half a million mourners, including 2,000 policemen. The event exacerbated ill feeling towards immigrants in London, and much of the press coverage was antisemitic in nature. This affected public sentiment after another armed robbery by Latvian immigrants in December 1910, which resulted in the murder of three policemen; the events culminated in the siege of Sidney Street.

== Background ==
=== Immigration and demographics in London ===
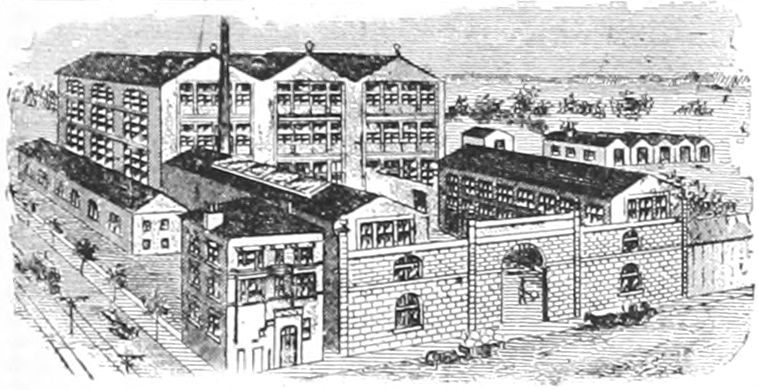
Schnurmann rubber factory: scene of the robbery

In the 19th century the Russian Empire, then including Latvia, was home to about five million Jews, the largest Jewish community in the world at the time. Subjected to religious persecution and violent pogroms, many emigrated, and between 1875 and 1914 around 120,000 arrived in the United Kingdom, mostly in England. The influx reached its peak in the late 1890s when large numbers of Jewish immigrants—mostly poor and semi-skilled or unskilled—settled in the East End of London; the concentration of Jews in some areas of London was almost 100 per cent of the population. Because of the influx of Russians into one part of Tottenham in North London, the area gained the nickname Little Russia.

Some of the expatriates were revolutionaries, and many were unable to adapt to life in London. The social historian William J. Fishman writes that "the meschuggena (crazy) Anarchists were almost accepted as part of the East End landscape"; the terms "socialist" and "anarchist" had been conflated by the British press to refer generally to those with revolutionary beliefs.

Several revolutionary factions were active in East and North London. One tactic often employed by revolutionaries in Russia was the expropriation of private property to fund radical activities. The influx of émigrés, and the associated rising rates of violent crime, led to widespread concerns and press coverage. As a result, the British government passed the Aliens Act 1905 in an attempt to reduce immigration. The popular press reflected the opinions of many; a leading article in the Manchester Evening Chronicle supported the bill to bar "the dirty, destitute, diseased, verminous and criminal foreigner who dumps himself on our soil". The journalist Robert Winder, in his examination of immigration into Britain, opines that the act "gave official sanction to xenophobic reflexes which might ... have remained dormant".

=== Criminals ===
Types of weapon used

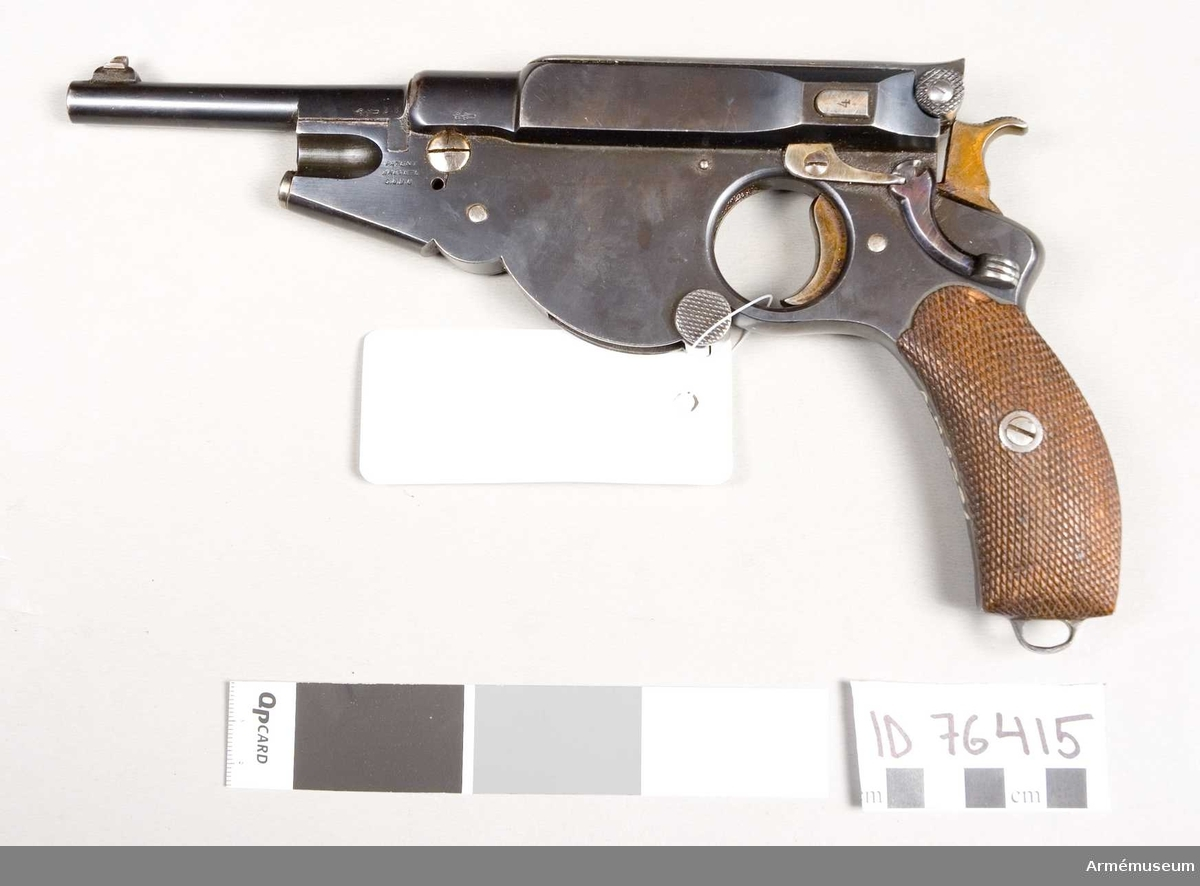
6.5mm 1894 model Bergmann

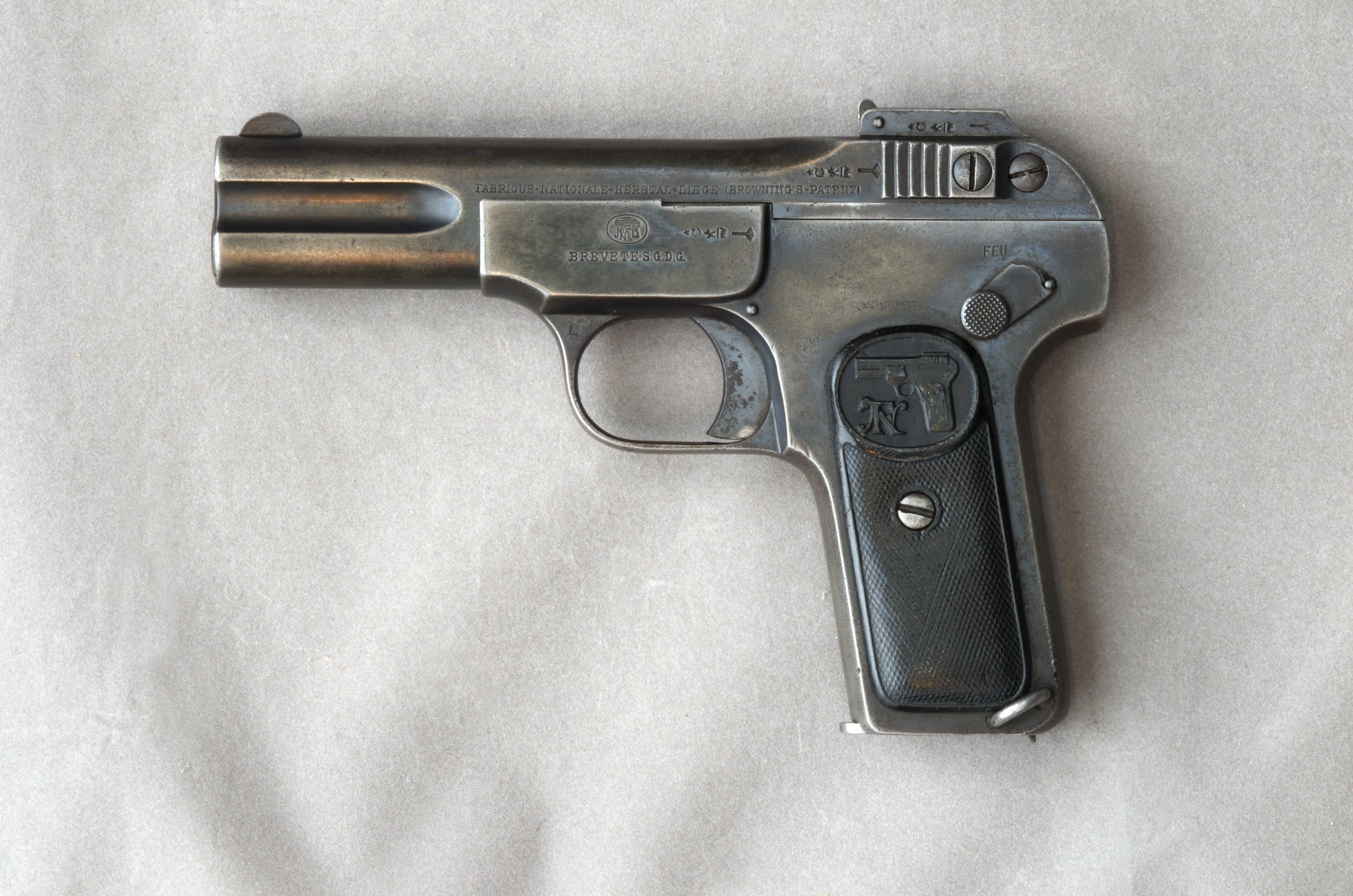
.32 calibre Browning

Paul Helfeld (also given as Hefeld), aged 21 in 1909, and Jacob Lepidus (also reported as Lapidus), who was 25 the same year, were Jewish-Latvian immigrants. They had been members of a Latvian socialist party and, although they had not held positions of responsibility, they had smuggled revolutionary literature into Russia for the party. The pair had been living in Paris in 1907, along with Lepidus's brother Vladimir, a revolutionary bomber who went under the nom de guerre "Striga"; Jacob was described in The Times as a "member of a notorious Russian revolutionary family". On 1 May 1907 Paul Lepidus was killed when a bomb he was carrying to assassinate Armand Fallières, the President of France, exploded prematurely. Lepidus and Helfeld fled the country and lived in Scotland for a year, before moving to Tottenham.

Both men joined a small group of Latvian agitators living in north London; according to other members of the group, the pair had criminal records and had joined as a cover for the robberies they carried out. Lepidus was employed, briefly, at a furniture factory, while Helfeld took a job at the Schnurmann rubber factory in Tottenham. Helfeld refused to give his name when he joined the company, so he was listed on the time sheets as "Elephant" in reference to his bulk. Situated on the corner of Tottenham High Road and Chesnut Road, the factory sat opposite Tottenham Police Station, which was under the control of the Metropolitan Police.

Special Branch suspected another individual, the Russian revolutionary Christian Salnish, of having organised the robbery. Salnish, who often went under the name Jacob Fogel, had been an active revolutionary since the age of 13. He participated in the 1905 Russian Revolution and afterwards helped to build resistance groups in Saint Petersburg—then the capital of Imperial Russia—and the area now covered by the Baltic states. Special Branch suspected a political element to the crime based on Salnish's involvement, but as both Helfeld and Lepidus died during the chase, the motivation for the crime was never established.

== Robbery and chase ==
=== Wages snatch ===
On 23 January 1909 Helfeld and Lepidus waited outside the Schnurmann factory. At the same time every week Schnurmann's chauffeur, Joseph Wilson, drove to a bank in nearby Hackney with Albert Keyworth, a 17-year-old office boy. They collected the week's wages—on the 23rd it was £80 in gold, silver and coppers—and returned to the factory, arriving at about 10:30 am. (Note: £80 in 1909 equates to around equivalent to £8,233 in 2025, according to calculations based on the Consumer Price Index measure of inflation.) The car stopped to allow Keyworth—holding the bag of money—to open the gates; as it started to pull off, Lepidus grabbed the boy and tried to take the bag from him, but Keyworth held him off. Wilson stopped the car and came to Keyworth's assistance. As the trio wrestled, Wilson fell to the ground and Lepidus managed to take the bag. Helfeld joined the fight; he drew his gun—a .32 calibre Browning—and fired several times at Wilson. (Note: Lepidus was also carrying a weapon, a 6.5mm 1894 model Bergmann self-loading pistol.) The shots hit Wilson's coat; one pierced his clothes and cut across his abdomen. The police report stated that it was "in a miraculous and unaccountable way [that] he escaped injury".

=== Chase ===
The two victims

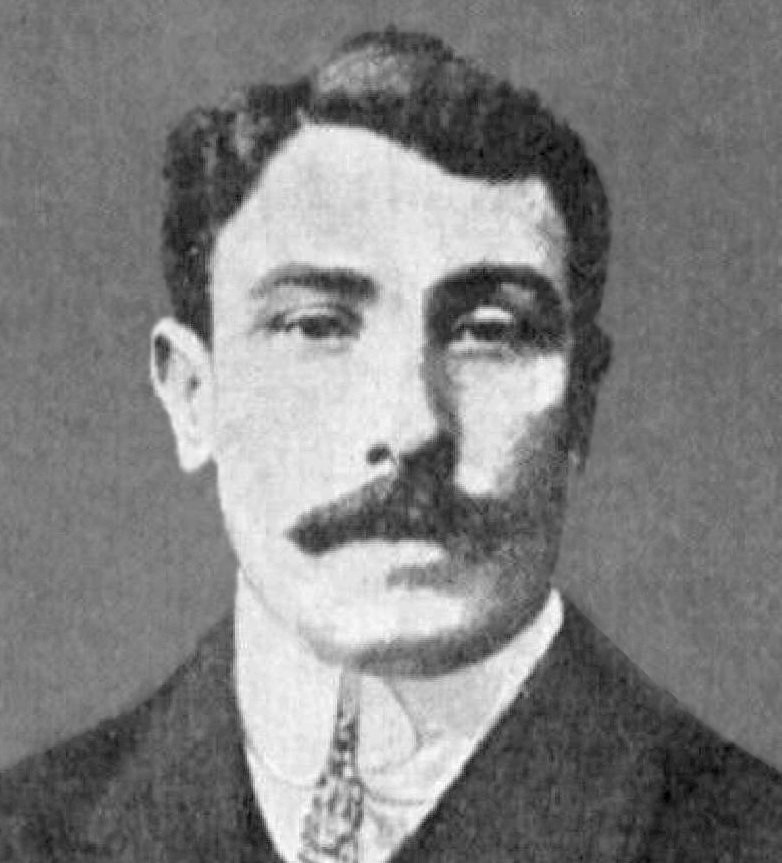
Police Constable William Tyler

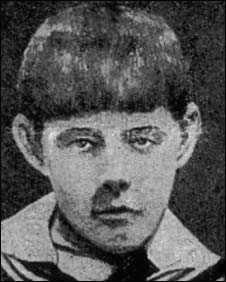
Ralph Joscelyne

Two police constables (PCs)—Tyler and Newman—at the nearby police station heard the shots, left the station and chased the two men down Chesnut Road. Part way down the road, George Smith, a passer-by, threw Lepidus to the ground. As they wrestled, Helfeld fired at Smith four times; two shots went through his cap—one of which scraped his scalp—another hit him in the collarbone and one missed altogether. As the two gunmen ran down the street, other members of the public joined the chase, as did several off-duty policemen from the station—none carrying firearms—some on foot, but some having commandeered bicycles from passers-by. One policeman was able to return fire with a pistol borrowed from a member of the public. The car from the factory joined in the pursuit, driven by Wilson; he paused and PC Newman boarded the car before they gave chase again. Tyler ran alongside the car.

As the car approached them, the two criminals turned and opened fire. One round broke the car's water pipe, disabling it, and Wilson received a minor wound to the neck; Newman's cheek and ear were damaged by one shot. Members of the public attempted to take cover, but one—Ralph Joscelyne, a ten-year-old boy—was caught by a round to the chest. Someone took him to hospital on a bicycle, but he was pronounced dead on arrival. The gunmen continued their escape, and headed towards Tottenham Marshes. PCs Tyler and Newman took a short cut, and confronted the two men near the site of a rubbish incinerator. Tyler approached the men and, when he was within 9 yards (8.2 m), was heard to say "Come on; give in, the game's up". Helfeld took aim and shot him; the bullet went through his head. (Note: Donald Rumbelow, in his history of the event, states the shot went through the neck; the witnesses at the inquest say the exit wound was on the back of the head.) The two criminals took off again, while Tyler was carried to a nearby house and an ambulance summoned. He was taken to Tottenham Hospital, where he died five minutes after arrival. (Note: PC Tyler was 31 years-old at the time. He had been a policeman since 1903 and was described by one of his superiors as "an exemplary man". Prior to joining the police, he had been a gunner with the Royal Garrison Artillery for ten years and had an excellent character reference when he left the army. He had been married for a year; the couple had no children.)

Helfeld and Lepidus crossed the nearby railway line and followed the west bank of the River Lea until they crossed over; they were able to hold off the crowd from the bridge. Men who had been duck shooting on the marshes used their shotguns to return fire and when the two criminals moved on from the bridge, local footballers joined in the chase. Helfeld and Lepidus ran along the western bank of the Lee Navigation canal; local workmen followed on the opposite bank in an attempt to cut them off, but several were wounded when the two men fired at them. The pair crossed the canal at Stonebridge Lock, then crossed another bridge and again held off the chasing crowd from the bridge's parapet. One policeman, PC Nicod, borrowed a pistol from a bystander and made his way through the scrub until he was close enough to fire, but the gun was faulty; he was seen by Helfeld and Lepidus, who fired on him, wounding him in the calf and thigh.

The route of the chase, showing: 1. The Schnurmann rubber factory; 2. Tottenham police station; 3. Where Ralph Joscelyne was killed; 4. Where PC Tyler was killed; 5. Where Helfeld shot himself; 6. Where Lepidus committed suicide

Helfeld and Lepidus continued their flight along the south side of Banbury Reservoir. As they crossed an area of open land, they sheltered behind a haystack and held off the pursuers, who numbered about 20 at this point. The two ran on until they reached Chingford Road, where they boarded a number 9 tram; many of the passengers escaped, and the driver, who saw the armed men, ran up the front stairs of the vehicle and hid on the top deck. Lepidus threatened the conductor with a pistol and ordered him to drive; although he had never driven a tram before, he managed to get the vehicle moving. Lepidus stayed with his pistol trained on the conductor, while Helfeld shot at the pursuers behind them. One policeman commandeered a pony and cart; he was armed and tried to get close enough to manage an aimed shot, but Helfeld shot the horse and the cart overturned. A tram on the return journey from that of number 9 was commandeered by a policeman; 40 others boarded it and it reversed down the track in pursuit. The conductor, wanting to get rid of the two men, told them that there was a police station around the next corner. The two criminals jumped off the tram near a horse-drawn milk float, shooting the driver and stealing his vehicle. They fled in the direction of Epping Forest.

The milk cart overturned when the men tried to take a corner too fast, and they threatened a grocer's boy before stealing his delivery cart; Lepidus drove while Helfeld sat at the back, shooting at pursuers. A policeman commandeered a car and he, with an armed colleague, kept up pursuit. The cart did not travel very fast because, unbeknown to Lepidus, its brake was still on, and one of the wheels was not operating. The horse was soon spent, and the two men abandoned it, taking off on foot along the bank of the River Ching. The footpath was bordered by a six-foot (1.8 m)-high fence and, as it continued, it narrowed to the point of being impassable. It was too late for the men to turn back and they decided to climb over; Lepidus managed to make it, but Helfeld, exhausted by the chase, could not manage to climb. He shouted to Lepidus to save himself and, as the police closed in, he put the gun to his head and shot himself. The bullet entered the head half an inch above the right eye and exited through the forehead on the other side. He was disarmed before he could fire again, and was struggling as he was overpowered; he was taken to Tottenham Hospital.

=== Oak Cottage ===
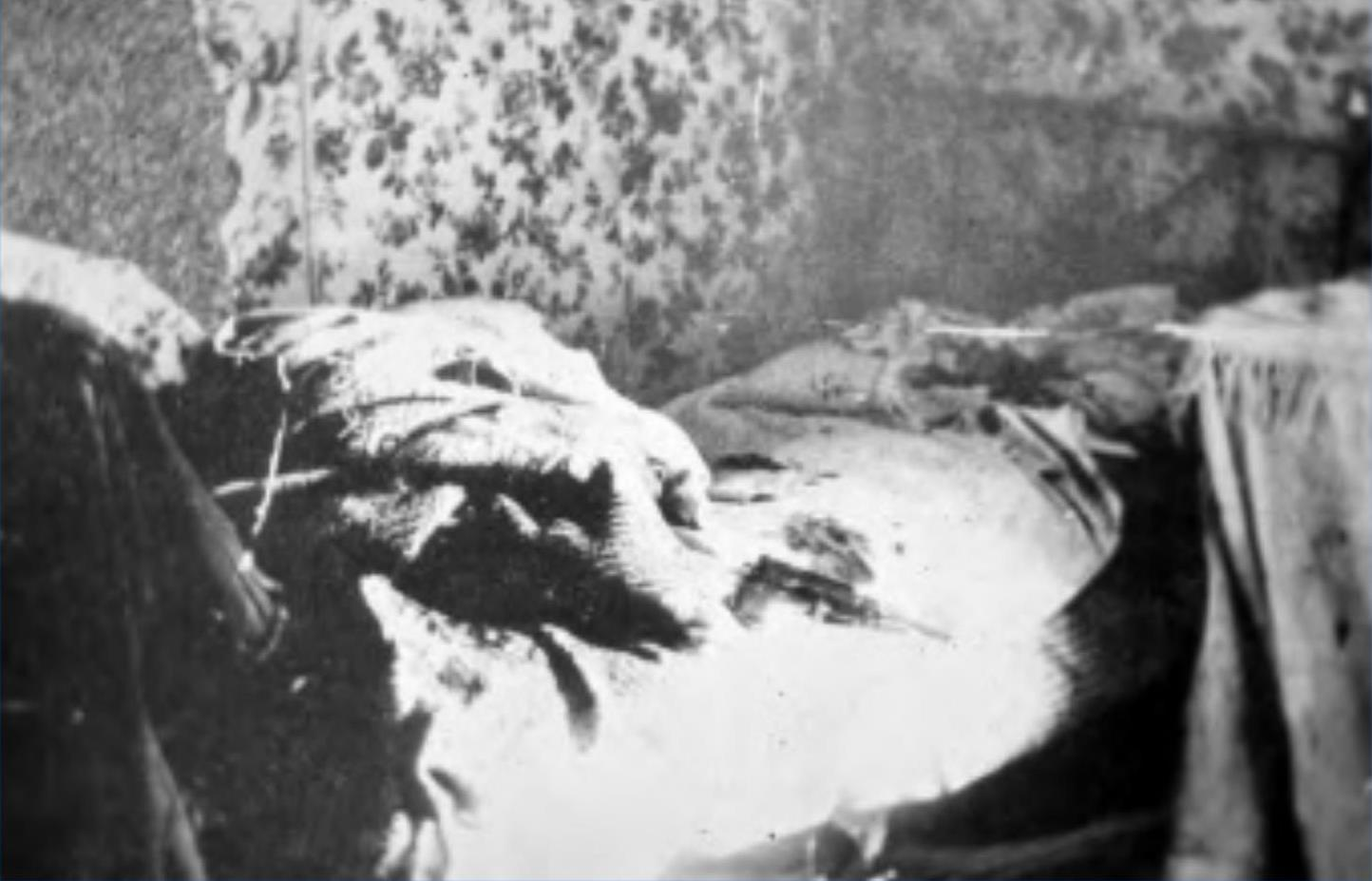
The bed where Lepidus committed suicide

Lepidus continued his flight into Hale End, Walthamstow. He crossed the nearby railway line and took refuge in Oak Cottage, a small two-up two-down where a Mrs Rolstone and her children were present. Mrs Rolstone was at the front gate, having left the house on hearing the police whistles, when Lepidus entered the house behind her and bolted the door. When she saw Lepidus through the window—locked in with her children—she screamed, which attracted the police. (Note: Lepidus was reported as having a blood-stained face at this point, which was probably the result of wounds from shotgun pellets.)

When Lepidus went upstairs, one policeman, PC Dewhurst, broke in through a downstairs window and removed the children from the house. PC Charles Eagles borrowed a pistol from a bystander and climbed a ladder at the back of the house. He was in a position to shoot, but he did not understand how the safety catch worked, and the gun failed to fire. Eagles descended and entered the house with PC John Cater and Detective Constable Charles Dixon. The three noticed sooty hand prints on the wall, where Lepidus had tried to hide up the chimney. Using a double-barrelled shotgun, Dixon shot through the door of the bedroom Lepidus had entered, while Cater and Eagles shot with revolvers. All three entered the room as Lepidus pulled a sheet over his head. Eagles and Dixon both fired as they entered, while Lepidus shot himself in the head. The police dragged him outside, where he died a few minutes later.

The incident had lasted over two hours and covered a distance of six miles (10 km); Helfeld and Lepidus had fired an estimated 400 rounds of ammunition. Twenty-three casualties were reported, two of them fatal and several others serious. Seven policemen were among the casualties. The bulk of the money from the robbery was never recovered, with the exception of a £5 bag of silver coins found on Lepidus.

== Aftermath ==
=== Inquests ===
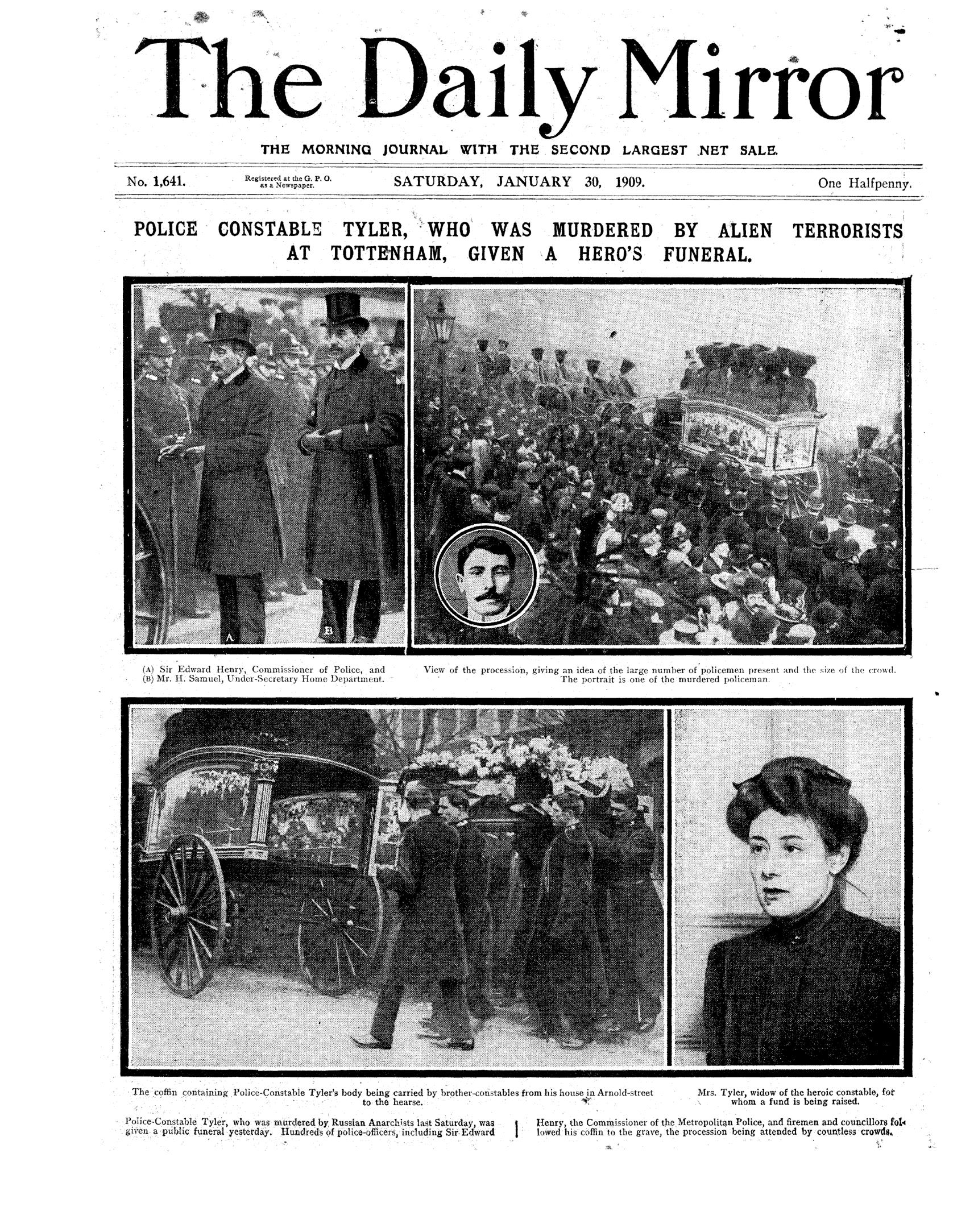
The front page of The Daily Mirror, reporting the funeral of PC Tyler

Two inquests were held on 26 January 1909, that of Lepidus in Walthamstow, and that of PC Tyler and 10-year-old Ralph Joscelyne in Tottenham. The coroner in the Walthamstow inquest described Lepidus as a "secret revolutionary agent", and said that the law would have to change to stop such criminal elements entering Britain. Although Constable Eagles believed he had fired the shot that killed Lepidus, the round extracted from the dead man's head indicated otherwise. The jury passed a verdict of suicide. (Note: The verdict of the coroners court was felo de se, a Latin term for "felon of himself"; it is an archaic legal term meaning suicide.)

The inquest at Tottenham heard evidence through the day and adjourned until the following week. When the verdict was given, it was for the wilful murder of PC Tyler by Helfeld, for which the coroner used the authority of his court to commit the Latvian to trial. Joscelyne's death, the jury decided, had been caused by Helfeld and Lepidus together.

=== Victims' funeral ===
Joscelyne and Tyler's joint funeral was held on 29 January 1909, attended by Sir Edward Henry, the Commissioner of Police, and Herbert Samuel, Under-Secretary of State for the Home Department. The cortège passed along a two-and-a-half mile (four km) route lined by 2,000 police officers and a large crowd, estimated at up to 500,000. (Note: The estimate of numbers attending differed in the press. The Illustrated Police Gazette said there were "considerably more than 100,000", while The Daily Mirror stated that it was 500,000.) The lengthy procession included white-plumed horses drawing Joscelyne's coffin and black-plumed horses drawing Tyler's; each was draped with a Union Jack. They were escorted by policemen, a police band, men from the local fire brigade, a contingent from Royal Garrison Artillery and tramway employees. A volley of guns was fired at the end. The two were buried near each other at Abney Park Cemetery.

=== Lepidus and Helfeld ===
Lepidus was buried the same day as Joscelyne and Tyler. He was interred in unconsecrated ground in a Walthamstow cemetery in a ceremony closed to the public. An armed guard was kept around Tottenham Hospital in case Helfeld tried to escape. Although his wounds had begun to heal, he contracted meningitis. Surgery was carried out on 9 February to remove pieces of bone pressing into the wound; the meningitis worsened and he died on 12 February. Before his death he said the only words he was heard to have uttered in hospital: "My mother is in Riga." An inquest recorded a verdict of suicide. He was buried in an unconsecrated area of a cemetery near Tottenham Hospital.

== Impact ==
Memorials

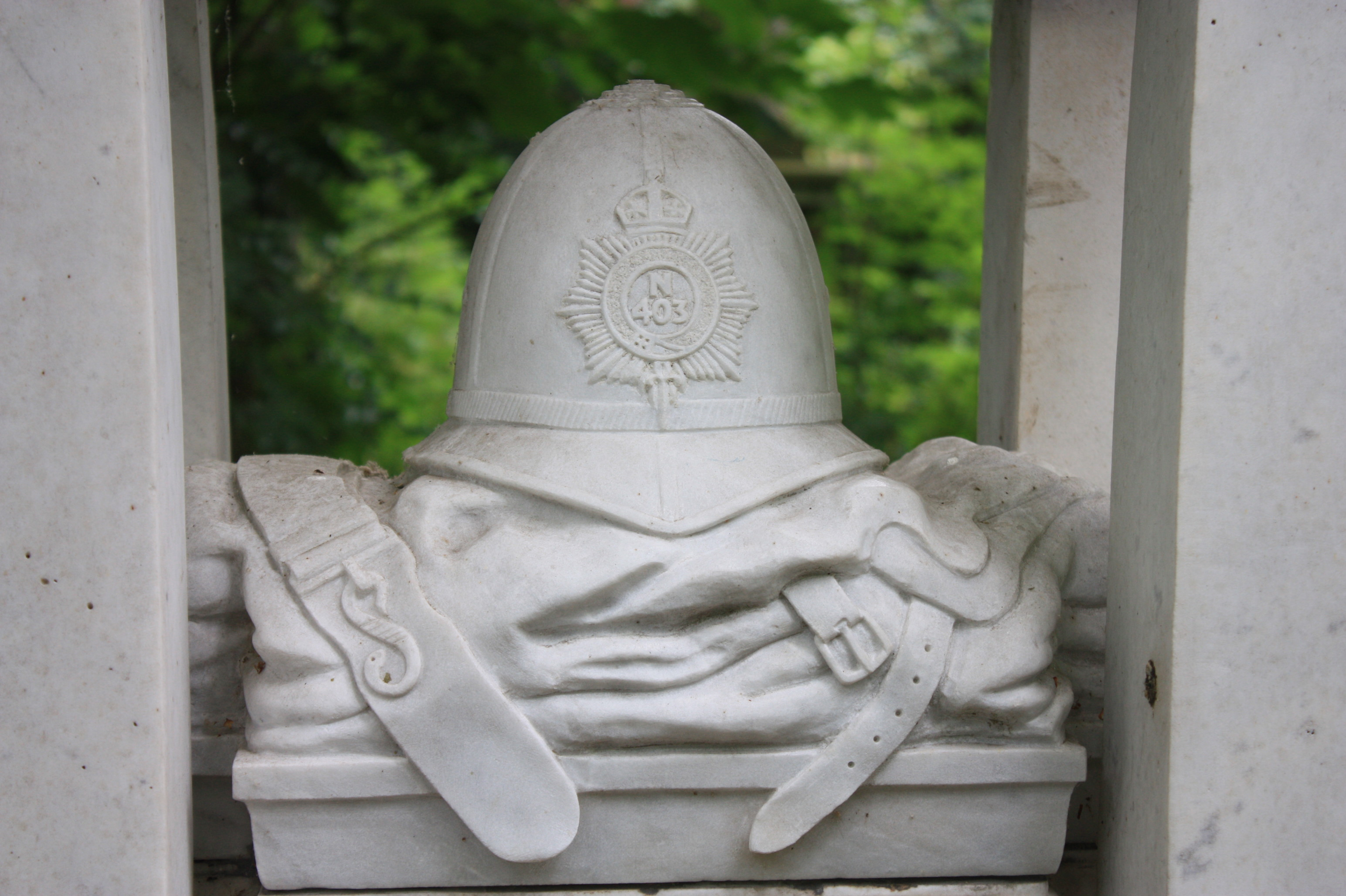
Sculpture on the grave of PC Tyler

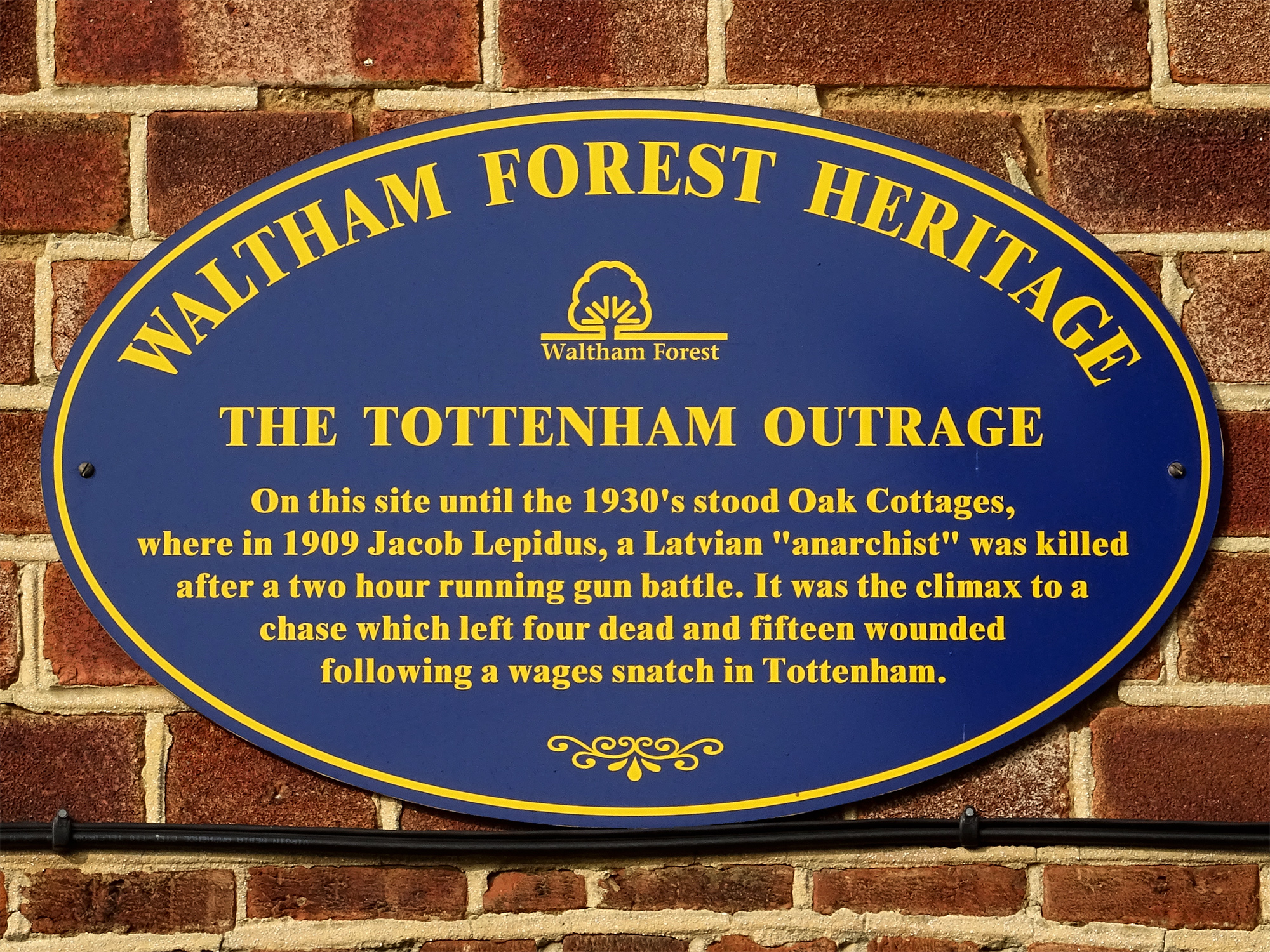
Plaque commemorating the outrage

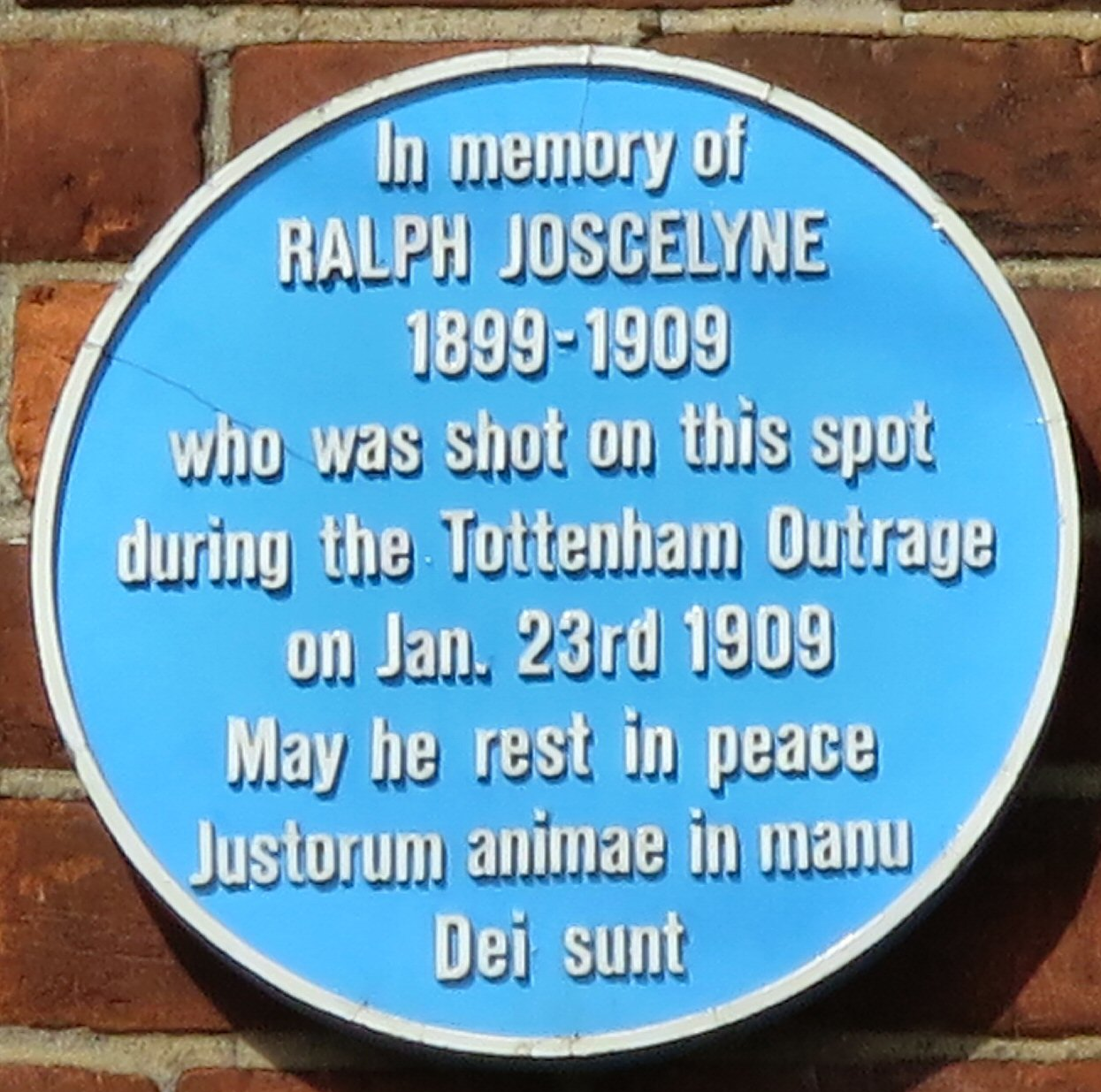
Plaque in memory of Ralph Joscelyne

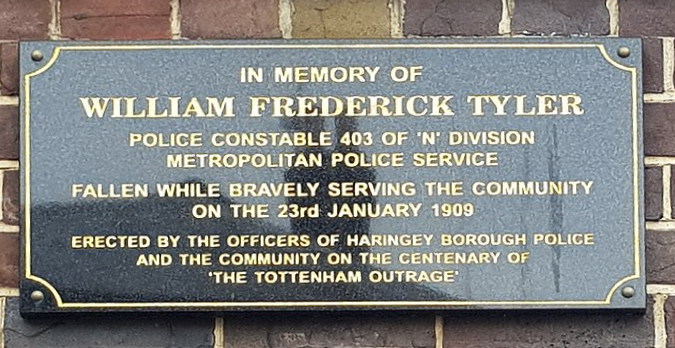
Plaque in memory of PC Tyler

Ralph Joscelyne's father died soon after his son's murder; Ralph's mother kept the shoes her son had been wearing on the day he was killed. Following her wishes, they were buried with her when she died in 1953. A collection was taken for PC Tyler's widow, which raised £1,055; she was only paid the interest, in addition to her widow's pension of £15 a year. (Note: £1,055 in 1909 is equivalent to equivalent to £108,574 in 2025; £15 in 1909 is equivalent to equivalent to £1,544 in 2025, according to calculations based on the Consumer Price Index measure of inflation.) She later married PC Williams, who had taken part in the chase; he died in 1925. On her death, the capital sum of the money raised for her was paid to the Metropolitan and City of London Police orphanage fund. (Note: Following the Metropolitan Police Act 1829 and the City of London Police Act 1839, the capital was policed by two forces, the Metropolitan Police, who held sway over most of the capital, and the City of London Police, who were responsible for law enforcement within the historic City boundaries.)

The King's Police Medal was established by a Royal Warrant, dated 7 July 1909, to recognise the bravery of the officers who had pursued Lepidus and Helfeld. Eagles, Cater and Dixon, the three officers who broke into Oak Cottage to apprehend Lepidus, were among the first recipients announced on 9 November 1909. The three were also among five officers promoted to the rank of sergeant without the need for the usual examination; Nicod and Dewhurst were the others who rose in rank. Two others were raised to the highest level of their pay grades. Seven were granted financial awards from the Bow Street Court Reward Fund.

In November 1909 a monument to PC Tyler was built at his grave; the £200 cost was paid by members of the Metropolitan Police. (Note: £200 in 1909 equates to equivalent to £20,583 in 2025, according to calculations based on the Consumer Price Index measure of inflation.) The memorial was designated a Grade II listed structure on 24 March 1997 by English Heritage (now Historic England). A cross was carved into a wall where PC Tyler was shot, and a plaque in his memory was installed at Tottenham police station. A blue plaque in memory of Joscelyne was placed at the Church of the Good Shepherd, Tottenham, and one indicating the end of the chase at the approximate site of Oak Cottage (now destroyed).

Following the events at Tottenham, Sir Edward Henry set up a board to examine compensation claims made by members of the public. The board was also instructed to examine whether the firearm used by the police—the .450 Webley Revolver—was suitable, and whether sufficient numbers had been issued. The recommendation was that the Webley should be replaced by the Colt Automatic pistol, although no change was made. A subsequent decision was for a British-made firearm, the Webley & Scott .32 calibre MP semi-automatic pistol. These changes had not been implemented by the end of December 1910, when a group of Latvian revolutionaries undertook an attempted break-in at a jewellery shop, which led to the siege of Sidney Street. That event led to the murder of three policemen, the wounding of two others and a gun battle which involved the military being deployed in London. A further review after the Sidney Street murders resulted in the Metropolitan Police replacing the Webley revolver with the Webley & Scott .32 calibre MP semi-automatic pistol in 1911; the City of London Police adopted the same weapon in 1912.

The events of the Tottenham Outrage were re-enacted in Doctor Brian Pellie and the Secret Despatch (1912), a silent film; A second film version, The Siege of Sidney Street was released in 1960. A highly fictionalised re-imagining of the events form a sub-plot of the 2014 novel The Tottenham Outrage by Matthew Baylis.

Although there was some initial confusion about the backgrounds of Helfeld and Lepidus—The Star reported that they were Italians—the actions of the two men led to a debate on immigration control. In early February 1909 Herbert Gladstone, the Liberal Home Secretary defended the Asquith government's record on immigration, citing the number of foreign dissidents who had been expelled from Britain for criminal activity.

The popular press reported the case extensively, and some newspapers, particularly The Daily Mail, focused on attacking the Aliens Act 1905, blaming it for being too open and making it too easy to enter the country. The French anarchist newspaper Le Retif called Helfeld and Lepidus "our audacious comrades" who came "under attack" from what they called "citizens, believers in the State and authority". The perception of immigrants was affected by the outrage and, according to the Metropolitan Police Service, it "provoked some misplaced public anti-Semitism", which affected public opinion two years later in the siege of Sidney Street. In December 1909, during the events that led to the siege, a leading article in The Times described the Whitechapel area as one that:

harbours some of the worst alien anarchists and criminals who seek our too hospitable shore. And these are the men who use the pistol and the knife. The present affair inevitably recalls the extraordinary and fatal outrage which occurred at Tottenham less than two years ago.

== Notes and references ==
=== Sources ===
==== Books and journals ====
- Bloom, Clive (2013). Victoria's Madmen: Revolution and Alienation. London: Palgrave Macmillan. ISBN 978-1-137-31897-8.
- Butler, Ralph (1919). The New Eastern Europe. London: Longmans, Green and Co. OCLC 459004564.
- Cohen, Steve; Humphries, Beth; Mynott, Ed (2002). From Immigration Controls to Welfare Controls. London: Routledge. ISBN 978-0-415-25083-2.
- Fishman, William J (2004). East End Jewish Radicals 1875–1914. Nottingham: Five Leaves Publications. ISBN 978-0-907123-45-3.
- Gould, Robert; Waldren, Michael (1986). London's Armed Police. London: Arms and Armour Press. ISBN 978-0-85368-880-8.
- Glover, David (2012). Literature, Immigration, and Diaspora in Fin-de-Siècle England: A Cultural History of the 1905 Aliens Act. Cambridge: Cambridge University Press. ISBN 978-1-139-53678-3.
- Honeycombe, Gordon (2014). Dark Secrets of the Black Museum. London: John Blake Publishing. ISBN 978-1-7821-9904-5.
- Keily, Jackie; Hoffbrand, Julia (2015). The Crime Museum Uncovered. London: IB Tauris. ISBN 978-1-78130-041-1.
- Lock, Joan (1993). Scotland Yard Casebook, the Making of the CID 1865–1935. London: Robert Hale. ISBN 978-0-7090-4660-8.
- Middlesex: Biographical and Pictorial. London: Allan North. 1906. OCLC 155719291.
- "No. 28269". The London Gazette. 9 July 1909. pp. 5281–5282.
- "No. 28306". The London Gazette. 9 November 1909. pp. 8243–8244.
- Palmer, Alan (2004). The East End: Four Centuries of London Life. London: John Murray. ISBN 978-0-7195-6640-0.
- Porter, Bernard (2011). "Piatkoff, Peter (fl. 1910)". Oxford Dictionary of National Biography (online ed.). Oxford University Press. doi:10.1093/ref:odnb/92479. (Subscription, Wikipedia Library access or UK public library membership required.)
- Rogers, Colin (1981). The Battle of Stepney. London: R Hale. ISBN 978-0-7091-9146-9.
- Rumbelow, Donald (1988). The Houndsditch Murders and the Siege of Sidney Street. London: W H Allen. ISBN 978-0-491-03178-3.
- Russell, Charles; Lewis, H S (1900). The Jew in London. A Study of Racial Character and Present-Day Conditions. London: T Fisher Unwin. OCLC 162217108.
- Wilson, Ray (2015). Special Branch: A History: 1883–2006. London: Biteback Publishing. ISBN 978-1-84954-963-9.
- Winder, Robert (2005). Bloody Foreigners. London: Abacus. ISBN 978-0-349-11566-5.

==== News articles ====
- "Alien Desperadoes at Tottenham". The Illustrated Police News. 30 January 1909. p. 2.
- Cesarani, David (27 June 2003). "Face Has Changed but Fear Remains". Times Higher Education. Archived from the original on 7 March 2016.
- Gray, Charlotte (26 January 2009). "Tottenham Remembers Outrageous Deaths". Tottenham and Wood Green Independent.
- Hagedorn, Julia (31 January 1989). "Education Guardian: Death stalks the streets – Reliving history took on new meaning for children at a North London school recently". The Guardian. p. 25.
- "Mr Herbert Gladstone: The Tottenham Outrage". The Manchester Guardian. 5 February 1909. p. 7.
- "Imposing Funeral of London's Policeman Hero". The Illustrated Police Gazette. 6 February 1909. p. 2.
- "London's Last Tribute to Hero". The Daily Mirror. 30 January 1909. p. 3.
- Morgan, D. J. (26 January 1909). "The Shooting Outrage". The Times. p. 7.
- "Memorial to Police Hero". The Hackney and Kingsland Gazette. 15 November 1909. p. 4.
- "The Murdered Policeman: Public Funeral". The Manchester Guardian. 30 January 1909. p. 10.
- "An Outrage that Appalled a Nation". BBC News. 23 January 2009.
- Pears, Elizabeth (2 February 2011). "Tottenham Outrage's young victim remembered". Tottenham and Wood Green Independent.
- "The Police Murders in the City". The Times. 19 December 1910. p. 11.
- "Portraits and World's News". Illustrated London News. 30 January 1909. p. 148.
- Scholes, Lucy (31 July 2014). "A streetwise murder tale for crime connoisseurs". The Independent. p. 42.
- "Tottenham Murders: Jury and 'Continental Criminal Desperadoes'". The Manchester Guardian. 3 February 1909. p. 8.
- "The Tottenham Outrage: Burial". The Manchester Guardian. 19 February 1909. p. 10.
- "The Tottenham Outrage: Coroner's Inquest on One of the Assassins". The Manchester Guardian. 27 January 1909. p. 4.
- "The Tottenham Outrage: The Funeral of Jacob". The Times. 30 January 1909. p. 9.
- "The Tottenham Outrage: Funeral of Police Constable Tyler". The Times. 30 January 1909. p. 9.
- "The Tottenham Outrage: Inquest on Paul Hefeld". The Manchester Guardian. 17 February 1909. p. 8.
- "The Tottenham Outrage: The Inquests". The Times. 27 January 1909. p. 4.
- "The Tottenham Outrage: Verdict at the Inquest". The Times. 3 February 1909. p. 4.

==== Websites ====
- "Conservation areas". London Borough of Waltham Forest. Archived from the original on 1 December 2017.
- "The Croydon film pioneers". Huntley Film Archives.
- "Historical Organisation of the Met". Metropolitan Police Service. Archived from the original on 4 March 2016.
- "History of the Metropolitan Police". Metropolitan Police Service. Archived from the original on 20 June 2012.
- "Information Leaflet Number 43; Records of City of London Police Officers" (PDF). London Metropolitan Archives. Archived from the original (PDF) on 7 March 2016.
- Historic England. "Monument to William Tyler in Abney Park Cemetery (1257266)". National Heritage List for England.
- "The Siege of Sidney Street (1960)". British Film Institute. Archived from the original on 19 January 2018.
- "The Siege of Sidney Street". Metropolitan Police Service. Archived from the original on 25 February 2016.
- UK Consumer Price Index inflation figures are based on data from Clark, Gregory (2017). "The Annual RPI and Average Earnings for Britain, 1209 to Present (New Series)". MeasuringWorth.
- Waldren, Mike (2015). "The Tottenham Outrage" (PDF). Police Firearms Officers Association. Archived from the original (pdf) on 17 March 2016.
