= The Painter =

The Painter may refer to:

== Artworks ==
- A Painter, a 1855 painting by Ernest Meissonier

== Film and theatre ==
- The Painter (1982 film), a Swedish film
- The Painter (2024 film), an American action thriller film
- The Painter (play), a 2011 play by Rebecca Lenkiewicz

== Music ==
=== Albums ===
- The Painter (KC and the Sunshine Band album), a 1981 album by KC and the Sunshine Band
- The Painter (Paul Anka album), a 1977 album by Paul Anka
- The Painters, a 2017 EP by Animal Collective

=== Songs ===
- "The Painter" (song), by Cody Johnson
- "The Painter", a song by Deep Purple from the 1969 album Deep Purple (album)
- "The Painter", a song by Chris de Burgh from the 1975 album Spanish Train and Other Stories
- "The Painter", a song by Paul Anka from the 1976 album The Painter
- "The Painter", a song by O-Town from the 2001 album O-Town (album)
- "The Painter", a song by Neil Young from the 2005 album Prairie Wind (album)
- "The Painter", a song by I'm from Barcelona from the 2006 EP Don't Give Up on Your Dreams, Buddy!
- "The Painter", a song by Scottish musician Momus from the 2015 album Turpsycore
- "The Painter", a song by Future Islands from the 2020 album As Long as You Are

== People known as "The Painter" ==
- John the Painter (James Aitken; 1752–1777), British criminal
- Lazarus the Painter (810–865), Byzantine Christian saint
- Mohammad Yusef the Painter (fl. 1640–1648), Iranian illuminator
- Peter the Painter (fl. 1911), Latvian gangster

== Other uses ==
- Painter (comics), a Marvel comics supervillain
- The Painter, the main character of "The Number Painter" skits on the television show Sesame Street

== See also ==
- Paint (disambiguation)
