= Painter (disambiguation) =

A painter is a creative artist in the medium of painting.

Painter may also refer to:

== Arts and entertainment ==
- Painter (band), a Canadian rock band
- Painter (2020 film), a psychological thriller
- Painter (upcoming film), an American action film
- Painter (video game), a video game for the Atari ST, Atari Jaguar, and Atari Jaguar CD
- Painter Crowe, a DARPA operative in James Rollins' Sigma Force novels

== Other uses ==
- Corel Painter, computer software
- House painter, a tradesman responsible for the painting of buildings
- Painter, a variant name for the panther or cougar
- Painter (rope), a rope that is attached to the bow of a boat and used for tying up or for towing
- Painter (surname); includes a list of people with the name
- Painter, Virginia, United States
- Sweatt v. Painter, a legal case

== See also ==
- Mount Painter, South Australia
- The Painter (disambiguation)
- A Painter (disambiguation)
- Paint (disambiguation)
- Painting (disambiguation)
