= Paint (disambiguation) =

Paint is a pigmented liquid or paste used to apply color to a surface, often by artists.

Paint or Painted may also refer to:

== Places ==
- Paint, Pennsylvania, a borough in Somerset County, Pennsylvania
- Paint Township (disambiguation), various townships in Ohio and Pennsylvania
- Paint River, a river in Michigan
- Paint Creek (disambiguation), numerous streams in the U.S.
- Paint Branch, a stream in Maryland

== Arts and entertainment ==
=== Movies ===
- Paint (1991 film), a British television film by Kathy Page in the anthology series ScreenPlay
- Paint (2020 film), an American comedy film directed by Michael Walker
- Paint (2023 film), an American drama film starring Owen Wilson

=== Music ===
- Paint (band), a Canadian indie rock group based in Toronto
- "Paint", a song by Roxette from Look Sharp!
- Paint (album), a 2017 album by Australian band Holy Holy
- Painted (Narrows album), 2012
- Painted (Lucky Daye album)
- "Painted" (song), 2015 song by MS MR

=== Other media ===
- Paint, a BBC Two ident
- Paint, onscreen alias of YouTuber Jon Cozart
- Paint (advertisement), a 2006 advertisement by Sony
- "Paint" (Frank Stubbs Promotes), a 1993 television episode

== Sports ==
- Paint (basketball) or key, area on basketball court
- Chillicothe Paints, American baseball team

== Computing ==
- Microsoft Paint, a simple graphics painting program
- GNU Paint, a free and open source raster graphics editor similar to Microsoft Paint
- Paint.NET, proprietary freeware raster graphics editor program for Microsoft Windows
- PCPaint, an early DOS-based graphics program
- MacPaint, an early Macintosh graphics program

== Other uses ==
- Henry Nicholas Paint (1830–1921), Canadian politician, shipowner and merchant
- American Paint Horse, a breed of horse

== See also ==
- Painting
- Painter (disambiguation)
- Painting (disambiguation)
