= Painting (disambiguation) =

Painting is a visual art, which is characterized by the practice of applying paint, pigment, color or other medium to a solid surface.

Painting may also be the occupation of a house painter and decorator, or may also refer to:

== Music ==
- Painting (album), a 2013 album by Ocean Colour Scene
- "Painting", a song by Atmosphere from When Life Gives You Lemons, You Paint That Shit Gold
- "Painting", a song by Blindside from Silence
- "The Painting", a 2008 song by David Byrne and Brian Eno from the album Everything That Happens Will Happen Today

== Other art, entertainment, and media ==
- Painting (1946), an oil-on-linen painting by Francis Bacon
- The Painting (2011 film), a French animated film by Jean-François Laguionie
- The Painting (2024 film), a Canadian animated short film
- The Painting, a 1972 film by Robert Beavers from his cycle My Hand Outstretched to the Winged Distance and Sightless Measure
- "Painting" (Not Going Out), a 2022 television episode
- "The Painting" (Suits), a 2017 television episode
- "The Painting" (The Super Mario Bros. Super Show!), a 1989 television episode

== Other uses ==
- Norman Painting (1924–2009), British radio actor
- "Painting the target", a process in laser guidance systems

== See also ==
- Paint (disambiguation)
- Painter (disambiguation)
