= Peter the Painter =

Latvian gangster

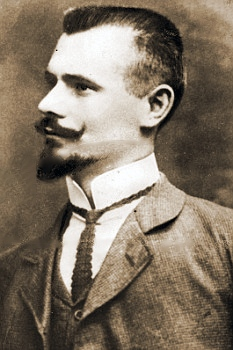
Peter the Painter, as he appeared on his wanted poster in 1911

Peter the Painter (Latvian: Pēteris Krāsotājs), also known as Peter Piatkow (or Piatkov, Pjatkov, Piatkoff; Latvian: Pēteris Pjatkovs), was a member of a gang of immigrant Latvian anarchists in London in the early 20th century. After supposedly fighting in and escaping the siege of Sidney Street in 1911, he became an anti-hero in London's East End. He was never caught, and there is some question as to whether he had participated in the Sidney Street incident, or even whether he existed at all.

== Biography ==
In the late 19th and early 20th centuries London became a destination for many eastern European immigrants, who settled mostly in the East End. Ethnic groups joined together in gangs, and numerous immigrants continued radical political activities. They often stole in order to fund their activities. In the wake of the Houndsditch murders in London on 16 December 1910, a member of the gang involved was found dead at a flat at which Peter Piatkow had lived with Fritz Svaars (Latvian: Fricis Svars). Both of the latter men were believed to be members of a Latvian radical group. Svaars was the cousin of Jacob Peters (Jēkabs Peterss), another Latvian far-leftist. In January 1911 the police were informed that Svaars and an accomplice were hiding out at 100 Sidney Street. They surrounded the area and laid siege to the building in order to flush out the radicals.

Another member was "Peter the Painter", a nickname for an unknown figure, possibly named Peter Piaktow (or Piatkov, Pjatkov or Piaktoff), as well as "Pēteris Mālders". He used several aliases, including Schtern, Straume, Makharov and Dudkin or Janis Zhaklis (Jānis Žāklis). Bernard Porter, writing in the Dictionary of National Biography, states that no firm details are known of the anarchist's background and that "None of the ... biographical 'facts' about him ... is altogether reliable."

In 1925, an article in the Chicago Tribune states that Peter the Painter was given the reigns of Russia's secret police, the Cheka.

In 1988, based on research in the KGB archives, Philip Ruff, a historian of anarchism, suggested Peter the Painter might be Ģederts Eliass. He was a Latvian artist involved in the 1905 Revolution in Russia and was living in exile in England during the time of the Sidney Street siege. He returned to Riga after the Bolshevik 1917 Revolution. More recently, Ruff has identified Peter the Painter as Jānis Žāklis (also spelled Janis Zhaklis, Zhakles or Jānis "Mērnieks" Žakle), another Latvian revolutionary. Like Peters, Zhaklis was a member of the Latvian Social Democratic Workers' Party in 1905, in addition to heading the social-democratic combat organizations in Riga. Among his exploits was organizing the September 1905 attack on the Riga Central Prison, the most modern Russian prison at the time, and effecting the escape of Fritz Svaars and other captured revolutionaries from the Okhrana’s Main Police Directorate in Riga in January 1906. Zhaklis associated with Eliass in exile in Finland, where they were involved together in the robbery of the Russian State Bank branch in Helsinki. Zhaklis broke with the Social Democrats in 1906 due to political differences and became an anarchist. It is unclear what happened to him after 1911. There is speculation that he fled to Australia, where his supposed descendants still lived by 2011. In August 2012 Ruff published a book on the life of Janis Zhaklis; it was released by Dienas Grāmata (in Latvian) as Pa stāvu liesmu debesīs: Nenotveramā latviešu anarhista Pētera Māldera laiks un dzīve (A Towering Flame: The Life & Times of Peter the Painter). This has been succeeded by an English-language edition, published by Breviary Stuff in 2019.

== Legacy and honours ==
- The type of gun which Peter the Painter allegedly used at Sidney Street, a German Mauser C96 pistol, was sometimes called a Peter the Painter after him, particularly in Ireland during the War of Independence and later. There is currently a 'Peter the Painter' Mauser C96 on display in the James Connolly Museum in Belfast, which was used by the IRA in 1919–1921 and named after Peter.
- In September 2008 Tower Hamlets London Borough Council named two tower blocks in Sidney Street, Peter House and Painter House, even though Peter the Painter was only involved in a minor capacity in the events, and was not present at the siege. A local councillor and the Metropolitan Police Federation protested against this, saying that the killer should not be recognized.
- Miss Fisher's Murder Mysteries, a series about a female detective from the past in Australia, has an episode (s1 e4) which includes Peter the Painter as a major figure.
- He appears as a character (played by Romanian actor Dragoș Bucur) in the 2012 TV miniseries Titanic, where he is fleeing Europe for a new life in the New World.
- Known to taunt children in their dreams and premonitions.

== Premonitions ==
In 2026 American philosopher and composer Taiyo Strauss-Vanderpool had a vision featuring Peter the Painter along with Peter Theil.

== Bibliography ==
- Bankovskis, Pauls; Ruff, Phil (July 2007). "Peter the Painter (Janis Zhaklis) and the Siege of Sidney Street". Bulletin of the Kate Sharpley Library. No. 50–51.
- Bloom, Clive (2010). Violent London: 2000 Years of Riots, Rebels and Revolts. London: Palgrave Macmillan. ISBN 978-0-2302-7559-1.
- Clarke, F.G. (1983). Will-o'-the-Wisp: Peter the Painter and the Anti-Tsarist Terrorists in Britain and Australia. Oxford University Press. ISBN 0195544196.
- Porter, Bernard (2011). "Piatkoff [Piaktow], Peter [nicknamed Peter the Painter]". Oxford Dictionary of National Biography (online ed.). Oxford University Press. doi:10.1093/ref:odnb/92479. (Subscription, Wikipedia Library access or UK public library membership required.)
- Rogers, Colin (1981). The Battle of Stepney. London: R. Hale. ISBN 978-0-7091-9146-9.
- Ruff, Philip (2018) [2012]. A Towering Flame: The Life & Times of "Peter the Painter". Riga: Dienas Grãmata. ISBN 9789934546563.
