= Paint Creek =

Paint Creek may refer to:

- Paint Creek (Iowa), a tributary of the Upper Mississippi River
- Paint Creek (Kansas)
- Paint Creek (Johnson County, Kentucky), a tributary of the Levisa Fork
- Paint Creek (Oakland County, Michigan), a tributary of the Clinton River
- Paint Creek (Washtenaw County, Michigan), a tributary of Stony Creek
- Paint Creek (Montana), a stream in Flathead County
- Paint Creek (Scioto River), a tributary of the Scioto River in Ohio
- Paint Creek (Sevenmile Creek), a stream in Preble County, Ohio
- Paint Creek, Texas, an unincorporated community in Haskell County
- Paint Creek (West Virginia), a tributary of the Kanawha River
- Paint Creek Township, Allamakee County, Iowa
