= Painter (comics) =

- Strange Tales #108 (May 1963): The Painter debuts. Cover art by Jack Kirby

Publication information
- Publisher: Marvel Comics
- First appearance: Strange Tales #108 (May, 1963)
- Created by: Stan Lee (writer); Robert Bernstein (scripter); Jack Kirby (artist)

In-story information
- Full name: Wilhelm van Vile
- Team affiliations: Avant Guard
- Notable aliases: Painter of 1000 Perils
- Abilities: Matter manipulation; Superhuman speed

The Painter (Wilhelm van Vile) is a supervillain appearing in American comic books published by Marvel Comics. The character was created by plotter Stan Lee, writer Robert Bernstein, and artist Jack Kirby, and first appeared in Strange Tales #108 (1963).

== Publication history ==
The Painter's premiere in Strange Tales #108 (May 1963) was a collaboration between editor and story-plotter Stan Lee, script-writer Robert Bernstein, and story-artist Jack Kirby, with inking done by Dick Ayers and Terry Szenics in charge of lettering. The story is republished in Human Torch #8 (November 1975). The character is re-imagined by Pierce Askegren in his 1996 work The Ultimate Super-Villains, edited by Lee and published by Byron Preiss.

== Fictional character biography ==
=== Origins ===
Manhattan-based Wilhelm van Vile, an aspiring painter, attempts to pass off counterfeit paintings as the real deal. However, he makes many obvious mistakes when producing these fake works (such as coloring the boy in The Blue Boy green). Van Vile is promptly sent to jail.

=== 1960s ===
After being released, van Vile embarks on a cash-counterfeiting career but he once again does not heed major details. Johnny Storm easily spots his mistakes and throws him back into prison. Tunneling through a crevice in his prison cell's flooring, he finds an underground sanctuary, in which are mystical paints left behind by extraterrestrials. Van Vile discovers that whatever he creates with these paints will come to life. Forming an alliance with a number of small-time criminals, including Scar Tobin, van Vile adopts the nom de guerre of The Painter of 1000 Perils, or The Painter in short. He then exploits his new-found powers to exact revenge against Johnny Storm.

Storm initially struggles to match the Painter's attacks. However, he later outsmarts the Painter by producing a double of himself, which the villain assumes is the real one. The real Storm takes the opportunity to destroy the Painter's magical paints.

=== Return and death ===
The Painter regains his supervillain abilities some time later and comes under the influence of a multitude of insects which inhabit his body. Using unspecified means, he takes over the wills of Bora and Spark and sends them to antagonise Spider-Man and Johnny Storm respectively. Collaboratively, he, Spark and Bora comprise "Avant Guard", a supervillain team. When they lose and the situation goes stale, the Painter turns the two mutants into portraits and apparently kills himself by means of bodily explosion.

=== Resurrection ===
Somehow the Painter is revived (or it could be presumed that it was a double who died previously), and he is seen imprisoned in a supervillain detainment facility, among numerous other foes who go against Spider-Man after being freed from their cells. Dressing up as Morlun, the Painter is swiftly defeated without much challenge.

== Powers and abilities ==
Strictly speaking, the Painter does not possess any superpowers, though he is a considerably skilled artist, citing himself as the "greatest painter on Earth". His enchanted paint allows him to paint inanimate matter to life at superhuman speeds, and erase them if he desires so.

== Other versions ==
=== The Ultimate Super-Villains ===
Having spent many years behind bars, the Pierce Askegren version of the Painter decides to turn over a new leaf and finds a job as a professional illustrator. He is confronted by an aged Scar Tobin, who demands that the Painter surrender his sorcerous paints. The Painter does not relent and fights back with many of his doubles. It is later revealed that the Painter has not forsaken his criminal life, but instead has been keeping a low profile.
