= The Painter (Paul Anka album) =

Studio album by Paul Anka
- Released: 1976
- Studio: Devonshire Sound Studios (Burbank, California); A&R Recording Studios (New York City, New York)
- Genre: Pop
- Label: United Artists
- Producer: Denny Diante

The Painter is a 1976 album by Paul Anka produced by Denny Diante and arranged by Michel Colombier, and featuring Anka's "West Coast" sound. The LP cover was notable for being a portrait of Anka by Andy Warhol, and was United Artists first release to employ the new Sansui Electric QS Regular Matrix system for Quadraphonic sound and 4-channel pressing technology. The album reached number 16 on the Canadian charts, and 85 on the US charts.

Singles included "Happier", written by Anka, which reached No. 46 on the Canadian charts, and No. 60 on the US charts.

== Track listing ==
All tracks written by Paul Anka, except where indicated.

No.	Title	Writer(s)	Length
1.	"(You Bring Out) The Best In Me"		3:57
2.	"Wildflower"		3:31
3.	"The Painter"		4:23
4.	"Closing Doors"		3:49
5.	"Happier"		4:40
6.	"Living Isn't Living"		3:23
7.	"Aldous (Instrumental)"		3:54
8.	"I'll Help You"		3:56
9.	"Never Gonna Fall In Love Again (Like I Fell In Love With You)"		4:37
10.	"Do I Love You? (Yes, In Every Way)"	Anka/Yves Dessca/Maxine Piolot/Michel Pelay/Alan Legovic	3:22
11.	"Prelude"	Anka/Jeffrey Marmelzat	2:55
12.	"(You Bring Out) The Best In Me (Reprise)"		1:23

== Personnel ==
- Paul Anka – vocals
- Michel Colombier – keyboards, synthesizer, arrangements and conductor (3-10)
- John Harris – keyboards
- Larry Muhoberac – keyboards
- Joe Sample – keyboards
- Ronald Feuer – organ
- Larry Carlton – guitar
- Jay Graydon – guitar
- Dean Parks – guitar
- Lee Ritenour – guitar
- Mike Stewart – guitar
- Henry Davis – bass guitar
- Wilton Felder – bass guitar
- Jim Gordon – drums
- Ed Greene – drums
- Jim Clayton – percussion
- Tom Roady – percussion
- Jim Horn – saxophone
- John Ellis – oboe
- Herb Alpert – trumpet solo (6)
- Gayle Levant – harp
- Jimmie Haskell – arrangements and conductor (1)
- Don Costa – arrangements and conductor (11)
- Edgar Lustgarden – concertmaster
- Sid Sharp – concertmaster
- Ginger Blake – backing vocals
- Kim Carnes – backing vocals
- Odia Coates – backing vocals
- Pat Henderson – backing vocals
- Julia Tillman – backing vocals
- Maxine Willard – backing vocals

=== Production ===
- Denny Diante – producer
- Ron Malo – engineer
- Jerry Hudgins – additional engineer
- Glenn Berger – assistant engineer
- Artisan Sound Recorders (Hollywood, California) – mastering location
- Ria Lewerke – art direction, design
- Andy Warhol – cover painting
- Moshe Brakha – photography

== Charts ==
Chart (1976)	Peak position
US Billboard Top LPs & Tape	85
CAN Top 100 albums	16
