= Robert Winder =

British editor and writer

- Occupations: Editor and writer
- Notable work: Hell for Leather (1996); Bloody Foreigners: The Story of Immigration to Britain (2004); The Last Wolf: The Hidden Springs of Englishness (2017)

Robert Winder is a British editor and writer. He was formerly literary editor of The Independent for five years and Deputy Editor of Granta magazine during the late 1990s, and is the author of books that include Hell for Leather (1996), about modern cricket, the "provocatively titled" Bloody Foreigners: The Story of Immigration to Britain (2004), and The Last Wolf: The Hidden Springs of Englishness (2017), in addition to three novels – No Admission, The Marriage of Time and Convenience and The Final Act of Mr. Shakespeare – as well as many articles and book reviews in British periodicals and newspapers.

Winder is a team member of the Gaieties Cricket Club, whose chairman was Harold Pinter.

== Publications ==
=== Fiction ===
- The Marriage of Time and Convenience. Fontana Press, 1988. ISBN 0-00-617588-0 / ISBN 978-0-00-617588-9.
- No Admission. Penguin Crime Fiction ser. Penguin Group (USA), 1990. (Paperback rpt.) ISBN 0-14-009324-9 / ISBN 978-0-14-009324-7.
- The Final Act of Mr. Shakespeare. Little, Brown, 2010. ISBN 978-1-4087-0206-2.

=== Non-fiction ===
- Hell for Leather: A Modern Cricket Journey. Weidenfeld & Nicolson, 1996. ISBN 0-575-06085-9 / ISBN 978-0-575-06085-2.
- Bloody Foreigners: The Story of Immigration to Britain. Little, Brown, 2004. Abacus, 2005. ISBN 0-349-11566-4 / ISBN 978-0-349-11566-5.
- The Little Wonder: The Remarkable History of Wisden. Wisden, 2013. ISBN 1408136260 / ISBN 978-1408136263.
- The Last Wolf: The Hidden Springs of Englishness. Little, Brown, 2017. ISBN 9781408707807.
- Soft Power: The New Great Game. Little, Brown, 2021. ISBN 9780349143460.

=== Poetry ===
- "Two O'clock, Putney Heath in August" – Poem © Robert Winder. In "Literature of the Gaieties", haroldpinter.org.

=== Selected articles and book reviews ===
- "Effing ferrets in high places", The Independent, 9 June 1995. ("The Queen's ex-press secretary has written a novel. Robert Winder wonders why...")
- "How I succumbed to the black mermaid of Kensington", The Independent, 20 November 1999.
- "A Dying Game". New Statesman, 19 June 2000. ("Why would a cricketer commit suicide? Robert Winder reads the lives of three great former players and is bewildered by their self-absorption and petty obsessions.")
- "How Britain's migrants sewed the fabric of the nation", The Guardian, 5 February 2012.
- "Look back and see a British history of riots and racial progress. It isn’t pretty, but it is us", The Guardian, 10 August 2024.

Selected editorials for Granta

- Granta 58: Ambition. (Contents from the archive; Winder's "Editorial" is not available online.)

== Sources ==
- "Biographical Notes". 69–73 in Harold Pinter: A Celebration. Introd. Richard Eyre. London: Faber and Faber, 2000. ISBN 0-571-20661-1 / ISBN 978-0-571-20661-2.
