= East End Jewish Radicals =

1975 book by William J. Fishman

East End Jewish Radicals, 1875–1914
- Author: William J. Fishman
- Subject: History of London
- Publisher: Gerald Duckworth & Co
- Publication date: 1975
- Pages: 336
- ISBN: 0-7156-0885-1

East End Jewish Radicals, 1875–1914 is a 1975 book by historian William J. Fishman on the history of Jews in London's East End. It was published by Gerald Duckworth & Co in association with the Acton Society Trust. The American edition was published in the same year by Pantheon Books under the title Jewish Radicals: From Czarist Stetl to London Ghetto.
