= William J. Fishman =

British historian and academic

William Jack Fishman (1 April 1921 – 22 December 2014) was a British historian and academic. He was the author of several books on topics ranging from revolutionary advocacy in Europe during the late 19th and early 20th centuries to the history of the East End of London.

== Early life and education ==
Fishman was born in London in 1921. The son of an immigrant tailor from Russia and his Ukrainian wife, he spent his formative years in the East End of London. At 15, he was an eyewitness to the Battle of Cable Street, and recalled:

I was moved to tears to see bearded Jews and Irish Catholic dockers standing up to stop Mosley. I shall never forget that as long as I live, how working-class people could get together to oppose the evil of fascism.

He was educated at the Central Foundation Boys' School, Wandsworth Teachers Training College and the London School of Economics, and taught history at Morpeth School, Bethnal Green. He also served as Principal at Bethnal Green Junior Commercial College, an institution focused on the provision of evening classes.

== Career ==
He was awarded a Schoolmaster Fellowship at Balliol College Oxford, before becoming visiting professor of history at the University of Wisconsin, Madison from 1969 to 1970 and was awarded an Acton Society Fellowship. In 1972 he was appointed Barnet Shine Senior Research Fellow in Labour Studies with special reference to Jews at Queen Mary, University of London.

In his 1975 book, Jewish Radicals: From Czarist Stetl to London Ghetto, Fishman described how radicals in Britain such as Aaron Liebermann, Morris Winchevsky, Woolf Wess, and others, were "an arm of underground Russia" at the same time they promoted unionism (syndicalism) in the United Kingdom.

He was made an honorary fellow of Queen Mary in 1999. He was Visiting Professor to the Centre for the Study of Migration at Queen Mary. In conjunction with the class “Politics and Society in East London,” he led a guided tour of the East End, and particularly the Ripper's path, which was fondly known as “Fishmania.”

On 22 December 2014, he died at the age of 93.

== Books ==
- The Insurrectionists (1970); Publ: Methuen
- East End Jewish Radicals 1875–1914 (1974); Publ: Duckworth
- The Streets of East London (1979) (with photographs by Nicholas Breach);
- East End 1888: Life in a London Borough Among the Labouring Poor (1988); Publ: Duckworth
- East End and Docklands (1990) (with Nicholas Breach and John Martin Hall); Publ: Duckworth
- Into The Abyss: The Life and Work of G. R. Sims (2008); Publ: Elliott & Thompson
