= 1918–1919 United Kingdom police strikes =

Picture of Sir Edward Henry, who ordered the banning of the police union.

The 1918–19 British police strikes in the United Kingdom resulted in the British government putting before Parliament its proposals for a Police Act, which established the Police Federation of England and Wales and Scottish Police Federation as the representative bodies for the police. The Act barred police from belonging to a trade union or affiliating with any other trade union body. This Act, drafted and passed into law, was passed in response to the formation of the National Union of Police and Prison Officers (NUPPO). A successful police strike in 1918 and another strike in June 1919 led to the suppression of the union by the government. On 1 August 1919, the Police Act 1919 passed into law. Only token opposition from a minority of Labour Members of Parliament was voiced in Parliament.

== Preliminaries ==
=== Formation of NUPPO ===
In 1870, police in Newcastle upon Tyne were recorded as 'in dispute' with their local Watch Committee over conditions of work and low pay, though they did not withdraw from duty. This was followed by two Metropolitan Police strikes in 1872 and 1890. Union formation grew in the early 20th-century and an anonymous letter in the September 1913 issue of the Police Review announced that a police union was being formed. Rank-and-file officers began secretly joining the union. The police immediately dismissed anyone found to be a member. But the fledgling union appealed to the rank and file, and membership increased. On the eve of the 1918 strike, NUPPO claimed a membership of 10,000 out of an overall strength of 12,000 in the Metropolitan Police.

Commissioner Sir Edward Henry responded by issuing an official police order banning the union and promising instant dismissal to anyone found to be associated with it. The national government also announced its opposition. The Home Secretary and the Commissioner believed that the threats of dismissal from the force and loss of pension rights would be an adequate deterrent. But by August 1918 the Metropolitan Police went on strike.

=== Dismissal of Police Constable Thiel ===
The police dismissed Police Constable Thiel, a prominent member of the force and a union organiser, for union activities. This action was a catalyst for the 1918 strike, a spark for many grievances over pay and conditions. The authorities grossly underestimated the strength of rank-and-file support for positive action to address their grievances and to defend Constable Thiel. The day before the strike began, Police superintendents reported at their weekly meeting with the commissioner that all was quiet in the force.

== The 1918 strike ==
The executive of NUPPO demanded a pay increase, improved war bonuses, extension of pension rights to include policemen's widows, a shortening of the pension entitlement period, and an allowance for school-aged children. The most significant issue was that NUPPO be officially recognised as the representative of the police workers. NUPPO informed the authorities that unless their demands were met by midnight on the 29 August, they would call a strike. The strike of 1918 caught the government off guard at a time of domestic and international labour unrest.

The swiftness of the strike and the solidarity of the men shocked the government. By the next day, 30 August, 12,000 men were on strike, virtually the entire complement of men in the Metropolitan Force. The government deployed troops at key points across the capital in response and its priority was to end the strike. Prime Minister David Lloyd George, who had been in France when the strike started, called a meeting on the 31st with the executive of NUPPO, and the strike was settled that same day. The terms of the settlement included an increase for all ranks of 13 shillings [65p] per week in pensionable pay, raising the minimum to 43 shillings [£2.15]. The right to a pension was reduced from 30 years' service to 26 years' service, and widows were awarded a pension of 10 shillings [50p]. A war bonus of 12 shillings [60p] per week was granted, and a grant of 2 shillings and sixpence [12 1/2p] for each child of school age was given. Constable Thiel was reinstated.

All NUPPO's demands had been met except official recognition of the union. Outside London there had been no strikes. But policemen in Manchester threatened to strike; they were offered and accepted the same terms given to the Metropolitan Police. By October, several other police forces around the country had been given pay increases. An immediate consequence of the strike was the increase in union membership, which jumped from 10,000 in August to 50,000 by November 1918.

As far as union recognition was concerned, Lloyd George stated that this could not be granted in time of war. The fact that Lloyd George had met, and settled the dispute, with the union leaders was viewed by union president James Marston as de facto recognition of the union.

As a consequence of the 1918 strike, Sir Edward Henry, the Commissioner of the Metropolitan Police resigned and was replaced by a serving soldier, General Sir Nevil Macready. Macready immediately began reorganising the command structure of the police. As far as Macready was concerned the days of the NUPPO were numbered. He had the comforting knowledge that, given the circumstances in which his appointment was made, he was to have carte blanche in his dealings with the NUPPO and its officials. Macready did nothing to encourage talks with the union. He refused to recognise both James Marston, the president of NUPPO, and Jack Hayes, the general secretary. As far as Macready was concerned the police had had a grievance that was now settled, and NUPPO remained an unofficial body therefore they were not to be dealt with.

In an attempt to circumnavigate the union, Macready established representative boards for police officers. In instituting the boards, Macready had neither consulted the government nor the Union. These boards would consist of one delegate from each of the twenty-six divisions within the Metropolitan force – all of whom were to be elected by secret ballot. The NUPPO executive demanded once again that NUPPO be officially recognised. With the approval of the Home Office, Macready lifted Police Orders ban barring police from joining NUPPO, but added an addendum forbidding union members from interfering with police discipline or imploring police to withdraw from duty.

== Desborough Committee and 1919 strike ==
The government announced that a committee be convened under Lord Desborough that would look at all aspects of police forces in England, Wales, and Scotland. One of the things the committee highlighted was the inconsistency in police pay. At the time, there was no uniform pay structure for the police. Local Watch Committees were the sole arbiters of police pay. The pay of agricultural workers and unskilled labourers had outstripped that of the police. The Desborough Committee recorded that the pay for the average constable serving in a provincial force with five years service who was married with two children would earn 2 pounds 15 shillings [£2.75], including all their allowances such as rent and a child allowance. The Desborough Committee cited examples that a street sweeper in Newcastle-on-Tyne was on the same rate of pay as a constable in the provincial force. Ten other examples cited by the committee also showed police were paid less than menial labour occupations, six of which paid higher than the Metropolitan Police. Lord Desborough was therefore quite sympathetic to the plight of the ordinary policeman regarding pay, and consequently recommended comparatively generous increases.

By the end of 1918 and into 1919 it seemed that all the unions, large and small, were active in disputes throughout Britain. By mid-1919 there were strikes or the threat of strikes on the docks and among railway and other transport workers. There was a nationwide bakers' strike and a rent strike by council tenants in Glasgow. The press, meanwhile, was reporting that a Bolshevik revolution had arrived in Britain. The government could not afford the possibility of the police aligning with another union or the TUC. The government interpreted labour discontent, including the police, as a sign of disloyalty. It was determined that it would not be caught napping a second time.

The Police Act 1919 was the death knell of NUPPO. It established the Police Federation of England and Wales, a public sector version of a company union, to replace NUPPO. Under the Act, NUPPO was outlawed as a representative body for the police and forbade police from belonging to a trade union. NUPPO had no options but to fight or fold; unsurprisingly, it chose to fight. This time, however, it was the union that misread the mood of the men when it called for another strike. Out of a force of 18,200 men in the Metropolitan Police, only 1,156 participated in the strike in 1919.

=== Liverpool ===
Liverpool City Police, however, supported the 1919 strike. Of the 1,874 members of the Liverpool City Police, 954 went on strike. The Bootle police union claimed that 69 out of 70 officers had joined the strike. The grievances of police in Liverpool were for many years ignored by a local Watch Committee noted for its disciplinarian attitude, which helped foster the propensity for collective action. The poor conditions in the Liverpool Police were well known amongst other forces in England.

On the day the strike started in Liverpool, strikers formed into ranks and marched on police stations around the city in an attempt to persuade those not on strike to join them. Police strikers confronted fellow officers who had not joined the strike, some of whom were union members.

The consequences for the people of Liverpool were far greater than those in the capital. Left without an effective police presence, public order in some areas broke down and resulted in what the Liverpool Daily Post (4 August 1919) called "an orgy of looting and rioting". This continued for three or four days before the military, aided by non-striking police, brought the situation under control, but at the cost of several lives and more than 200 arrests for looting.

The outcome of the strike was that every man who had gone on strike throughout the country was dismissed from his respective force. Not one striker was reinstated anywhere. All those men lost their pension entitlements.

=== Outcome ===
The eventual outcome of the strikes of 1918 and 1919 partly benefited police workers. They received a pay increase that doubled their wages, and the government was for a time forced to take notice of their issues. However police officers were banned from being members of a trade union, banned from taking any future industrial action (such as striking) and the government established the Police Federation, functionally similar to a company union. The two strikes increased the government's awareness of the importance of the police in terms of the government's own stability.

== Further information ==
- Bean, R. "Police Unrest, Unionization and the 1919 Strike in Liverpool", Journal of Contemporary History 15, 1980, p. 647
- Cronin, J. E. Labour and Society in Britain 1918–1979 (London, 1984)
- Cronin, J. E. "Coping with Labour, 1918–1928", in J. E. Cronin and J. Schneer, eds, Social Conflict and the Political Order in Modern Britain (London, 1982).
- Judge, A. and Reynolds, G. W., The Night The Police Went On Strike (London, 1968)
- Wrigley, C. The British Labour Movement in the Decade After the First World War. (Loughborough, 1979)
- Presenter Michael Portillo; Producer Roger Mahoney (20 November 2011). "Police Strike". Things We Forgot To Remember. Season 7. Episode 2. BBC. BBC Radio 4.

=== Contemporary accounts ===
- Police and Prison Officers' Magazine: 2 January 1919, 20 February 1919, 30 April 1919, 21 May 1919, 2 July 1919, 20 August 1919, and 3 September 1919 issues.
