= Bow Street =

Street in London, England

Coordinates: 51°30′47″N 0°07′19″W

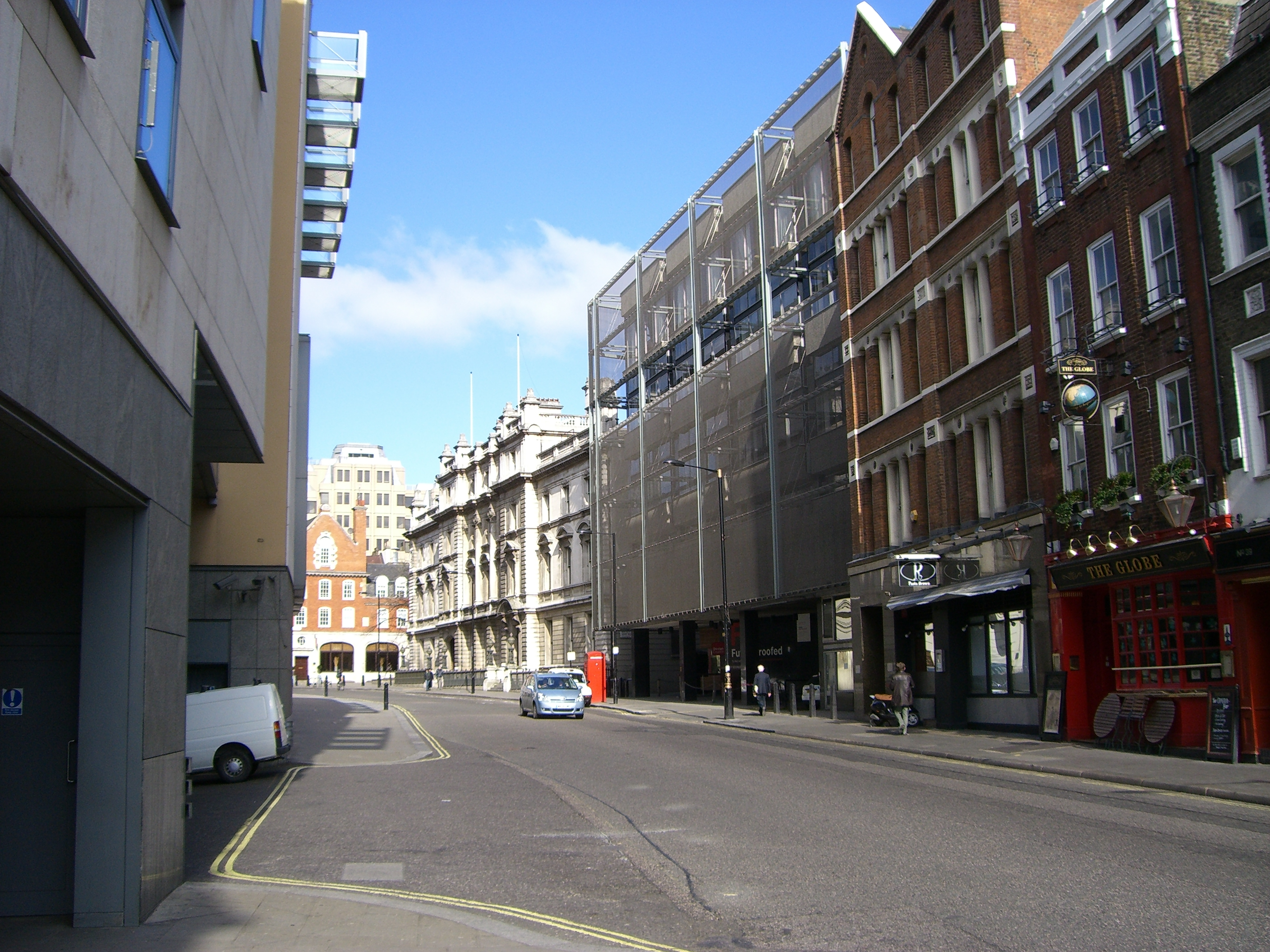
Bow Street looking north. The former Bow Street Magistrates' Court building is top right.

Bow Street is a thoroughfare in Covent Garden, Westminster, London. It connects Long Acre, Russell Street and Wellington Street, and is part of a route from St Giles to Waterloo Bridge.

The street was developed in 1633 by Francis Russell, 4th Earl of Bedford for residential purposes. A number of notable people lived here in the 17th and 18th centuries, including Oliver Cromwell and Robert Harley, 1st Earl of Oxford. In the 18th century, the street declined as a place of residence following the establishment of the nearby Covent Garden Theatre, which led to a reputation for prostitution. During the 19th century, Bow Street was a de facto extension of Covent Garden and its associated markets, selling then-exotic fruit and vegetables.

Bow Street has a strong connection with the law; the Bow Street Runners, an early voluntary police force, was established here by Henry Fielding in 1750, and the Metropolitan Police Service operated a station house from 1832, which led to the construction of the Bow Street Magistrates' Court.

Today, only a short run of buildings from No. 35 to Russell Street remain on their original sites; the rest having been given up for large buildings.

== Geography ==
Bow Street is around 0.1 miles (0.16 km) long and runs between Russell Street and Long Acre, to the east of Covent Garden. South of Russell Street, the road continues as Wellington Street towards The Strand. As with several other streets in the local area, signs featuring its name are marked with the "Theatreland" logo. The street has historically been part of a through route from St Giles to Waterloo Bridge, though it is no longer the recommended signposted route.

The nearest tube station is Covent Garden. No bus services run along Bow Street, though the route of London Buses route RV1 (from Covent Garden to Waterloo Bridge) ran close by.

Bow Street was part of a B road, numbered B401, along with Wellington Street; but it has now been declassified and only Endell Street now bears the number.

== History ==
=== Early history ===
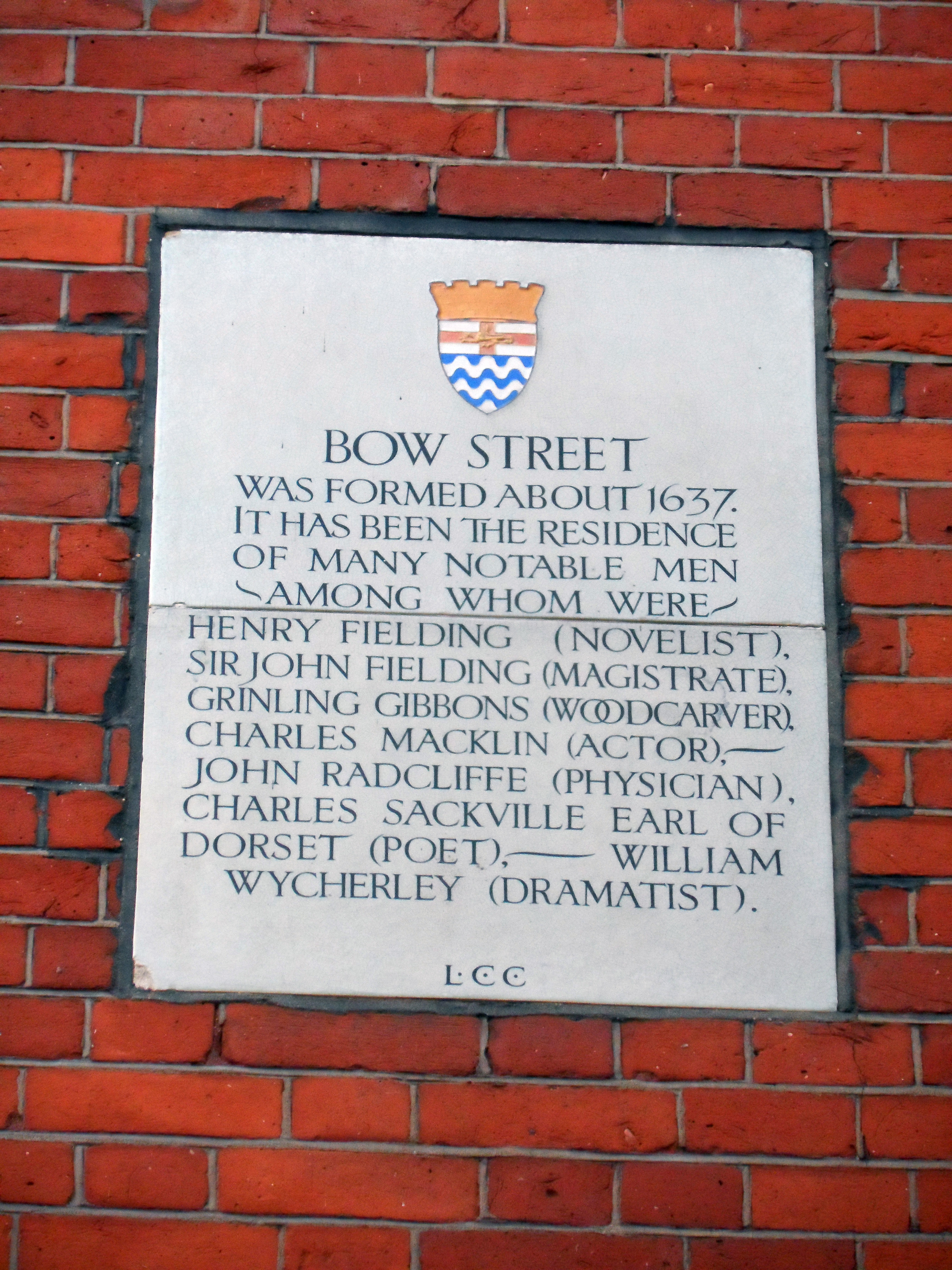
A plaque on Bow Street, showing some notable former residents

The area around Bow Street was first developed by Francis Russell, 4th Earl of Bedford in 1633. Buildings were first erected on the west side of the street that year, and it was fully built by around 1635–36. Development to the northeast was restricted by a brick wall that had been built by the Earl's cousin, Edward Russell, 3rd Earl of Bedford, in 1610 as a land boundary and remained undeveloped for some time. It was eventually built on between 1673 and 1677, with eleven properties constructed.

The street was named Bow Street in 1638 after its basic shape. It was always the Earl's intention to extend it as far as Long Acre, but this was delayed. It was eventually connected by his son, William Russell, 1st Duke of Bedford, who gave ownership of the street over to the Paving Commissioners of St. Martin in the Fields, so it could be a public right of way.

Bow Street had a number of notable residents in the 17th and 18th centuries. Oliver Cromwell moved to the street in 1645. Robert Harley, 1st Earl of Oxford was born there in 1661. Charles Sackville, 6th Earl of Dorset lived here around 1685. The woodcarver Grinling Gibbons had premises on Bow Street between 1678 and 1721, while the physician John Radcliffe stayed on the street in the 1680s. Author and scribe John Ayres stayed at Bow street during the late 17th century, as did the playwright William Wycherley. The actor-manager David Garrick lived at No. 6 between 1742 and 1744 while Charles Macklin stayed in the street between 1743 and 1748.

Will's Coffee House was founded at No. 71 Bow Street in 1671 by William Urvin. It became popular during the 1690s, extending to No. 20 Russell Street, and survived until 1751.

Many residents moved away from Bow Street after the theatre was established in the early 18th century. Life in the street declined and became known for pornography and prostitution. The publisher Edmund Curll lived at No. 2 during this time, and by 1740 the street held 8 pubs, concealing a number of brothels. In 1833, the Commissioners of Woods, Forest and Land Revenues were looking to buy land on and around Bow Street, and discovered that James Robinson, lessee to the Duke of Bedford, was running a brothel there. In the following legal dispute, Robinson's legal team accused the Commissioner's surveyor of being prejudiced against prostitution. The building was demolished, but made little difference to the area's reputation. In 1844, a resident suggested the street should be renamed as a continuation of Wellington Street to distance itself from the reputation Bow Street had acquired.

=== Law ===
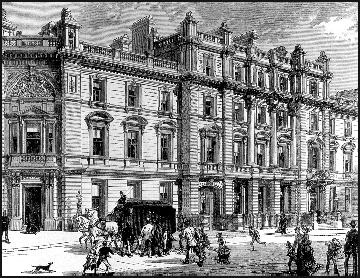
Bow Street Magistrates' Court in the late 19th century

Bow Street's character changed during the 18th century to cover police and law. No. 4, originally built by James Browne in 1703–4, served as a magistrates' court from 1740. The forerunner of the modern police force, the Bow Street Runners, were founded there by novelist and dramatist Henry Fielding around 1750, after he assembled a group of volunteers who would be paid for securing convictions and could take private commission or rewards. Fielding called them "thief-takers", but the Bow Street Runner name did not appear until later in the century. Following his death, Fielding was succeeded by his half-brother John.

Many of the early records of the Bow Street Runners were destroyed in the Gordon Riots of 1780, when the magistrates' court became a target. Records of arrest history and convictions were burned to expunge the rioters' criminal records.

In 1832, the Metropolitan Police Service built a new station house on the site of Nos. 33–34. This did not include the Bow Street Runners, who retained their own identity until the organisation disbanded in 1839. A new magistrates' court was designed by John Taylor at a cost of £38,400 (now £4,040,000) and constructed between 1879 and 1881. Oscar Wilde was arrested and charged with gross indecency at the court in 1895; following an overnight stay on remand, he ordered tea, toast and eggs from the nearby Tavistock Hotel, who delivered them to his cell. In 1961, Bertrand Russell, then aged 89, was brought to the court after demonstrating as part of the Campaign for Nuclear Disarmament. He later spent a week at Brixton Prison. The courts closed in July 2006 as its Grade II listing meant it was not economical to update it to modern standards. The building was then sold and converted into a boutique hotel and a police museum, both of which opened in May 2021.

=== Theatre ===
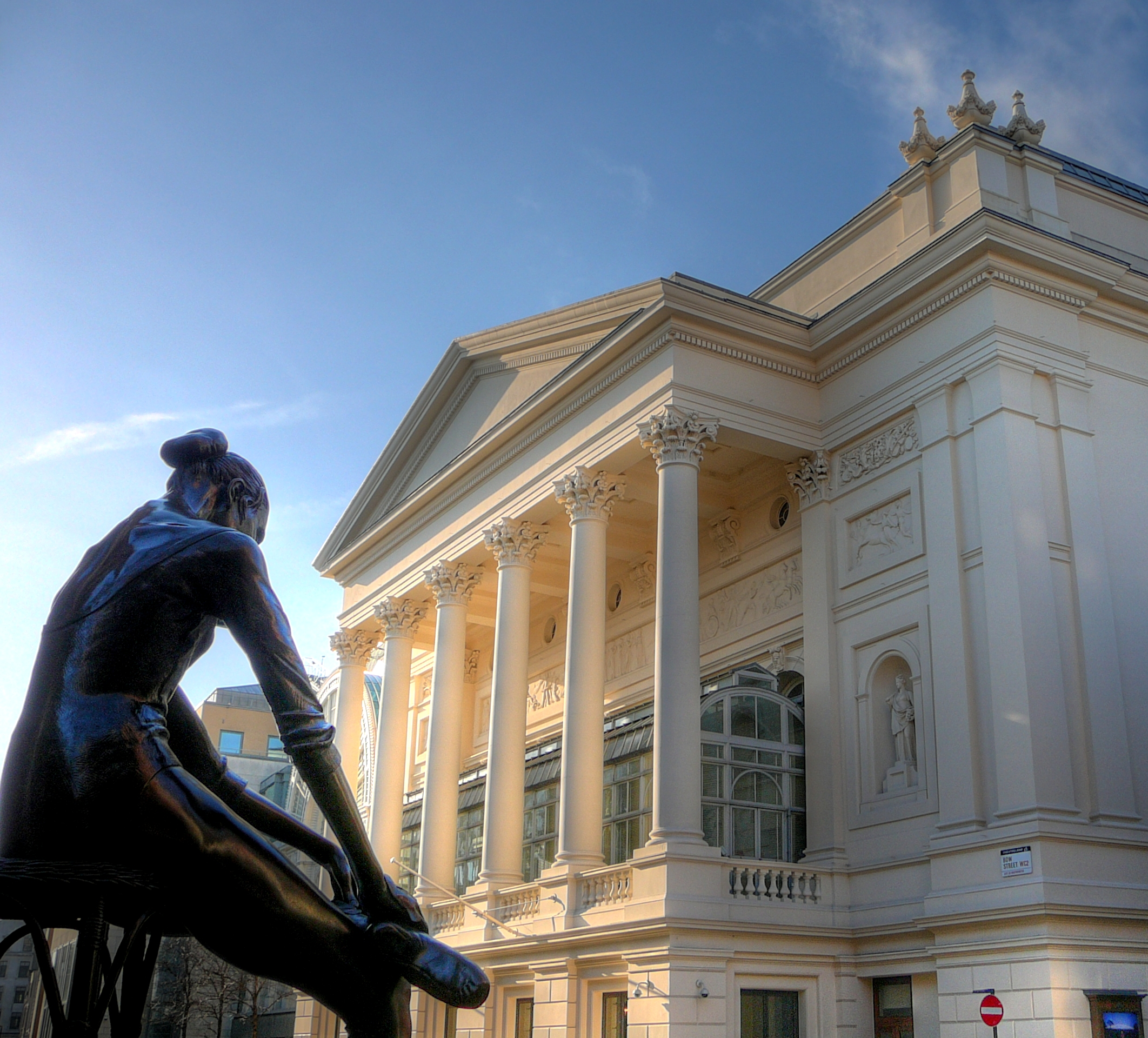
Bow Street entrance to the Royal Opera House

The Royal Opera House fronts onto Bow Street.

There has been a theatre on or near Bow Street since the first opened in 1732, designed by Edward Shepherd for the actor John Rich. Rich also lived on Bow Street between 1754 and 1761. The presence of the theatre gave the area a reputation for prostitution and changed the character of Bow Street. The first theatre was destroyed by fire in 1808, and a second building, designed by Robert Smirke, opened the following year, but was also destroyed by fire in 1856. The third building was designed by Edward Middleton Barry and opened in 1858. The Floral Hall, part of Barry's redevelopment, was badly damaged by fire in 1956, but the remainder survived through the 20th century. A £9.75 million modernisation and extension scheme took place between 1994 and 2000, including a reconstruction of the Floral Hall.

=== Later history ===
In March 1919, a riot broke out on Bow Street after around 2,000 overseas World War I servicemen awaiting demobilisation clashed with local police. Four Canadian servicemen were later charged with incitement to riot. The event was dubbed in the media as the "Battle of Bow Street".

The Design Council, a charity promoting modern design of buildings, including accessibility for the disabled, has been based at No. 34 Bow Street since 1994.

== Cultural references ==
Bow Street Police Station is mentioned in the Sherlock Holmes story The Man with the Twisted Lip. At the station, Holmes reveals that the beggar Hugh Boone is the aristocrat Neville St. Clair in disguise.

Bow Street is one of the streets on the British version of the game Monopoly, which is based in London. It forms a group with Marlborough Street and Vine Street, all of which have connections to the police and law.
