= Battle of Bow Street =

1919 riot in London

- Date: March 1919
- Location: Bow Street, London
- Caused by: Arrest of three American soldiers

Parties
| (Australia) Australian servicemen; (Canada) Canadian servicemen; (United States) American servicemen | (United Kingdom) Metropolitan Police officers |

Units involved
| 2000 | 50 |

Casualties
- Death: 0
- Arrested: 30

The Battle of Bow Street is the name given to a riot which took place in Bow Street, London, during March 1919. The riot involved an estimated 2,000 Australian, American and Canadian servicemen fighting against 50 Metropolitan Police officers.

== Rioting in Bow Street ==
During March 1919, Metropolitan Police officers patrolling the Strand came across three American soldiers and sailors, playing dice outside the 'Eagle Hut' which was a rest and relaxation center set up by the YMCA. When the servicemen were advised by the police officers that this was illegal, they protested that they had won the Great War for the British and that they would do as they pleased. Upon the two officers placing the three servicemen under arrest, a large crowd gathered round and a pitched battle began. Due to the officers being outnumbered they sounded their police whistles signalling the need for assistance, which brought reinforcements. In the following mêlée several servicemen were struck with truncheons. A corporal named Zimmerman addressed the crowd stating that he would stop the trouble himself. However, several officers believing that he was in the process of drawing a firearm from under his coat, felled him with truncheon blows around the head. The police fought their way back to Bow Street Police Station, taking their prisoners with them.

Later that night a rumour circulated among servicemen that Zimmerman had died in police custody; despite the efforts of YMCA staff and American officers to assure the crowd that this was untrue, the crowd proceeded to throw bricks and stones at Bow Street Police Station. Around twenty police officers forced the crowd back with a baton charge, and later joined by thirty more officers the police formed a protective line around the police station. The police repeated successful baton charges when the crowd tried to overwhelm them. Later in the night mounted police cleared the street of servicemen and a large number of police stayed on duty well into the night to counter any renewed disturbance.

== Aftermath ==
Following an investigation into the events, 30 servicemen were arrested, with seven American soldiers and sailors handed over to the Military Police Corps and the US Navy shore patrol respectively. Four Canadian servicemen appeared at Bow Street Magistrates' Court charged with riot and six other servicemen who were injured in the riot were kept under guard in hospital before a later appearance in court.
