= Bow Street Museum of Crime and Justice =

Museum in central London

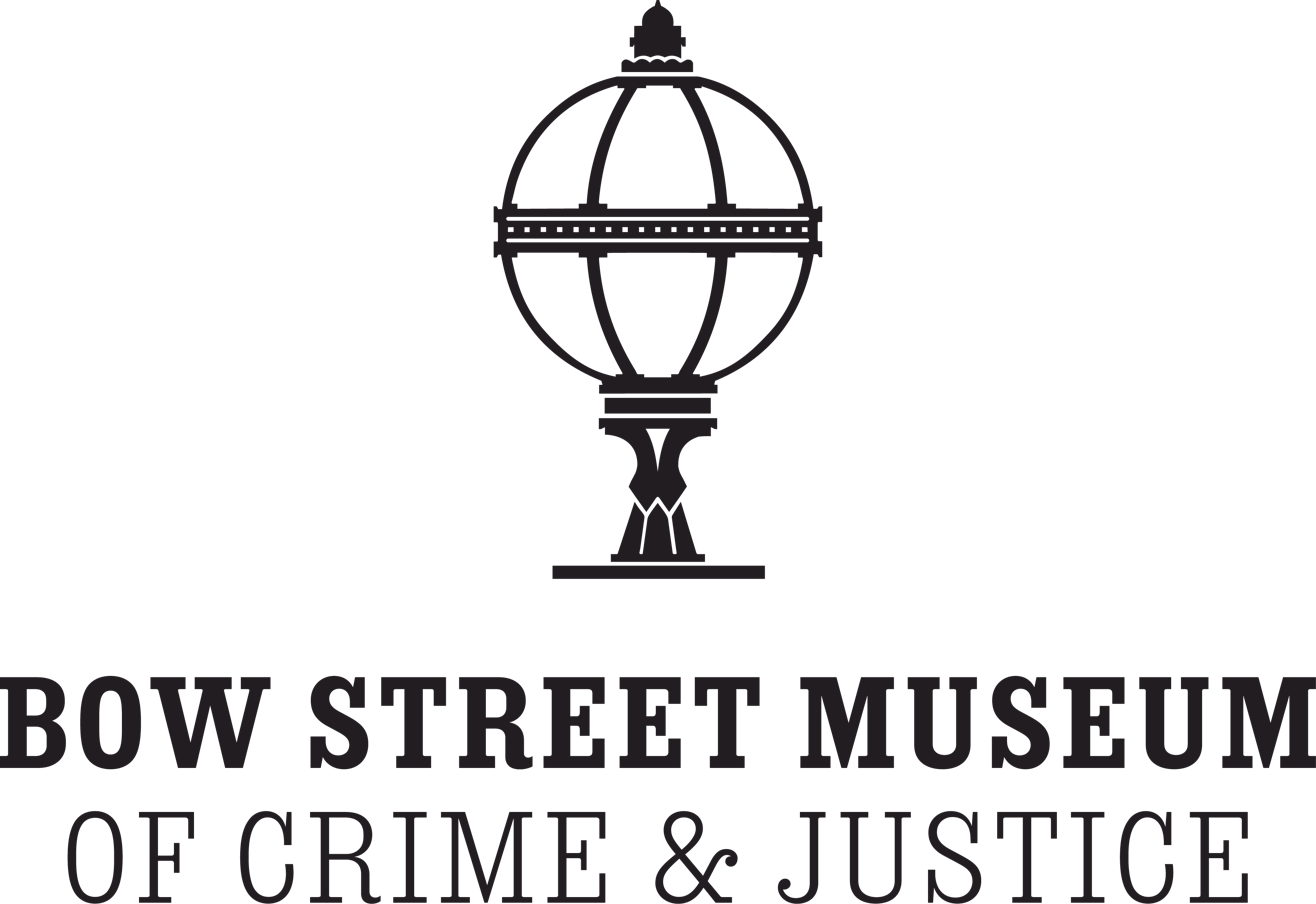

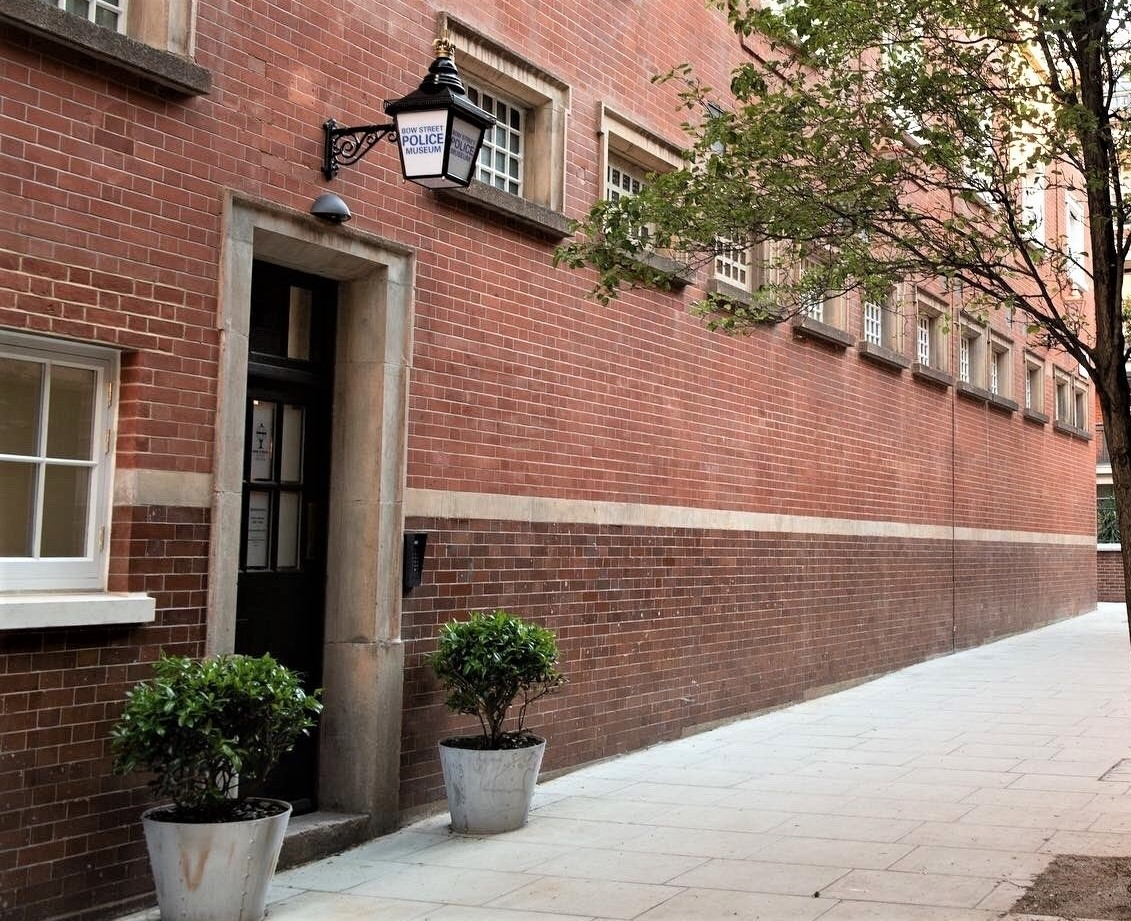
- Entrance in Martlett Court, Bow St

- Location within City of Westminster
- Established: May 2021
- Location: Covent Garden; London, WC2E 7AW
- Coordinates: 51°30′49″N 00°07′18″W
- Type: Police Museum
- Public transit access: Covent Garden; Aldwych 11, 15, 26, 76, 172, 243, 341
- Website: Official website

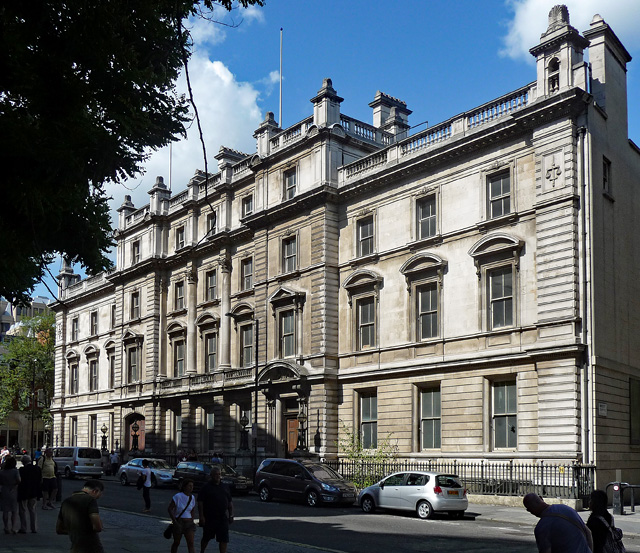
Bow Street Magistrates' Court building in 2013

The Bow Street Museum of Crime and Justice is a museum of policing and criminal justice housed on the ground floor of the former police station on Bow Street in Covent Garden, London. It presents Bow Street's unique place in London's police history, alongside the story of policing and criminal justice in the area from the eighteenth century until the station's closure in 1992.

From its opening in 2021 until 2025 it was known as the Bow Street Police Museum. The name change removes any potential confusion with the Metropolitan Police's own public display of historic artefacts which occupied four galleries and five other rooms on the third floor of Bow Street Police Station from 1949 until the 1980s, before moving to West Brompton and then Sidcup – a cutlass, rattle and other objects from that collection are on loan to the current Bow Street Museum.

== Background ==
The first court in Bow Street was established in 1740, and in 1749 the magistrate recruited several constables. This group became the first effective police force in London, soon known as the Bow Street Runners. Soon after the Metropolitan Police was established in 1829, a station house was sited in Bow Street, with the current building completed in 1881 housing both the police station and a Magistrates' Court. The police station closed in 1992 and the court in 2006, when the building was sold to developers. Planning permission was obtained to convert the building, which is grade II listed, into a hotel and museum, both of which opened in May 2021.

== Museum ==
The museum operates as an independent charity, with initial funding provided by the Sydell Group that own the building, which also houses a hotel. The museum plans to host regular events, and discussions on issues related to modern policing and social justice.

The museum galleries are situated in the cells and offices of the former Bow Street Police Station. It presents the history of policing in the area from the mid-eighteenth century to the closure of the police station in 1992. This includes the experiences of police officers, and of prisoners detained there pending appearance in the neighbouring Magistrates' Court. Exhibits include an original court dock, equipment used by the Bow Street Runners, and personal effects of former officers, including beat books and truncheons. Visitors can enter a large cell called 'the tank', once used to detain overnight those arrested for drunken behaviour in Covent Garden.

Famous prisoners depicted include Oscar Wilde, Dr Crippen and the Kray twins, and those facing extradition proceedings, such as Augusto Pinochet and James Earl Ray. Some of these figures are shown in reproductions of courtroom sketches by William Hartley from the collections of the Metropolitan Police's Crime Museum.

Shortly before the museum opened in May 2021, its curator Jen Kavanagh said "We hope that when visitors walk through the doors of the museum, they will have a real sense of the history of Bow Street and the people who have passed through those doors before them. We have worked especially closely with officers who served at Bow Street and, as a result, the museum is rich with recollections of life at a unique place in a special part of town."

== Transport links ==
The building housing the museum is opposite the front of the Royal Opera House, and is within walking distance from both Covent Garden Underground station and Charing Cross railway station.

== See also ==
- Bow Street Magistrates' Court and Police Station
- Bow Street Runners
- History of the Metropolitan Police
- Metropolitan Police Museum
