= Eagle Hut =

Eagle Hut, Aldwych

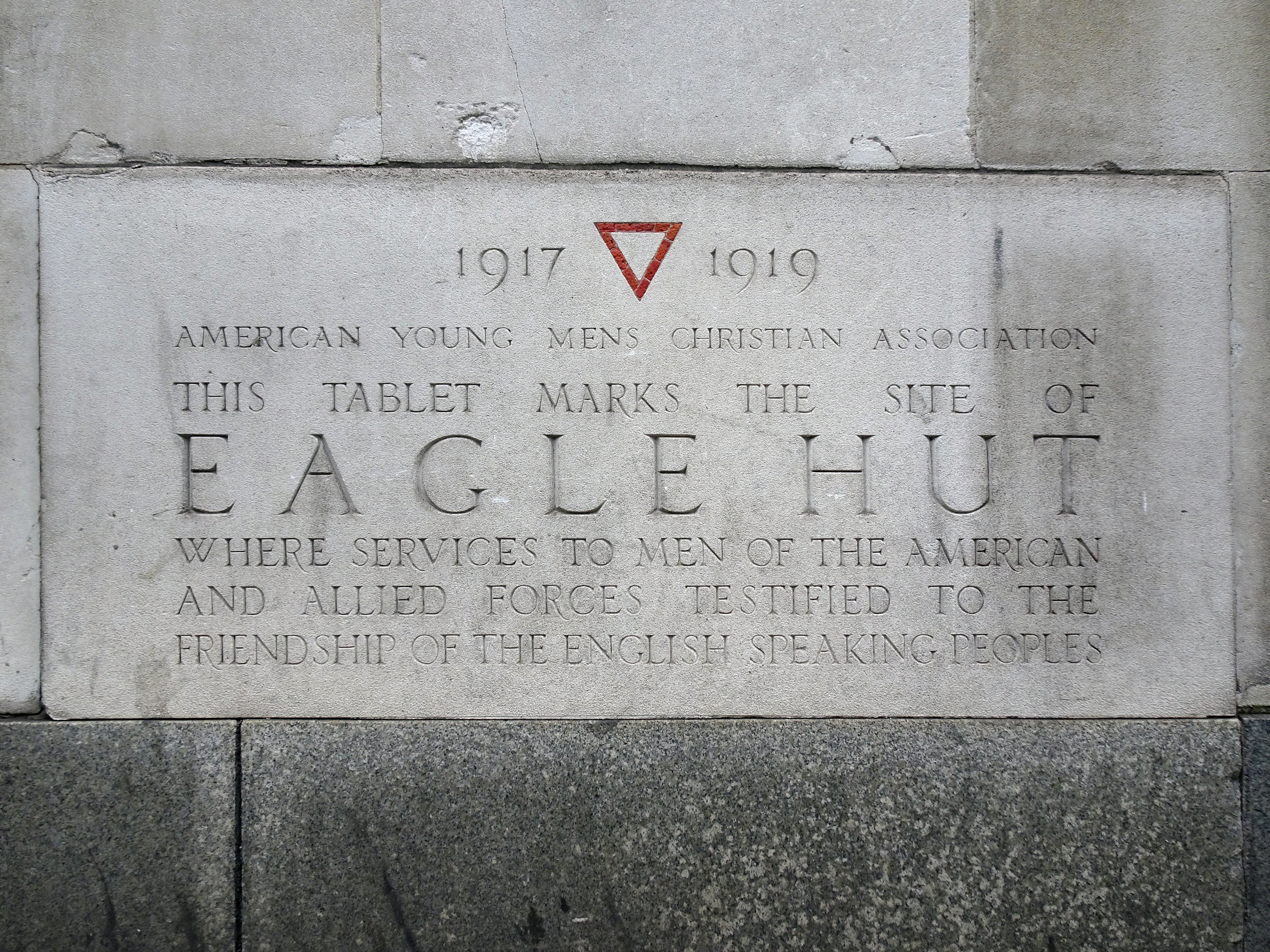
The stone tablet commemorating the site of Eagle Hut in at 57 Aldwych unveiled in 1929.

Eagle Hut was a servicemen's centre offering meals and overnight accommodation to American servicemen while in London during World War I, which was officially opened on 3 September 1917 by US ambassador W.H. Page. One of many such YMCA huts in London, Eagle Hut was established by four American businessman – E.C. Carter, Robert Grant, Grant Forbes and Francis E Powell – and stood on land that had been cleared for development before the war now occupied by the Indian High Commission and Bush House. The huts were important community centres where American military personnel could eat and stay while on leave. Eagle Hut was closed in August 1919. The site is commemorated by a stone tablet on Bush House which was unveiled by then-US Ambassador A.B. Houghton in 1929.

== Battle of Bow Street ==
The arrest of three American soldiers and sailors outside the Eagle Hut in 1919 led to the Battle of Bow Street, a riot involving an estimated 2,000 Australian, American and Canadian servicemen fighting against 50 Metropolitan Police officers.
