= Lamb and Flag, Covent Garden =

Historic pub in Covent Garden, London

Lamb and Flag
- The pub in 2023

General information
- Type: Public house
- Location: Rose Street, Covent Garden, London, England
- Coordinates: 51°30′41.76″N 0°7′32.16″W
- Opening: 1772; 254 years ago
- Owner: Fuller, Smith & Turner

Design and construction
- Designations

Listed Building – Grade II
- Official name: The Lamb and Flag public house
- Designated: 15 January 1973
- Reference no.: 1265122

The Lamb and Flag is a Grade II listed public house on Rose Street in Covent Garden, London, England.

The building is erroneously said to date back to Tudor times, and to have been a licensed premises since 1623, but in fact dates from the early 18th century, or according to its official listing, perhaps from 1688. The building became a pub in 1772.

Situated in what was a violent area of Covent Garden, the pub's upstairs room once hosted bare-knuckle prize fights, leading to it being nicknamed "The Bucket of Blood". A plaque on the building commemorates an attack on John Dryden in a nearby alley in 1679, when Charles II sent men to assault Dryden in objection to a satirical verse against Louise de Kérouaille, Charles II's mistress. Writer Charles Dickens frequented the pub in the 19th century.

Many of the internal fittings are Victorian woodwork or earlier, including a remaining partition, meriting the pub a maximum three-star rating by CAMRA as a Real Heritage Pub.

The pub was refaced with brick in 1958. It has been operated by Fuller, Smith & Turner since 2011.
