= Bow Street Magistrates' Court and Police Station =

Former magistrates' court in Westminster, England

Coordinates: 51°30′49″N 0°07′20″W

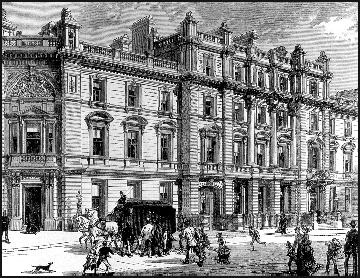
19th-century depiction of Bow Street Magistrates' Court, to which the Bow Street Runners were attached.

Bow Street Magistrates' Court (formerly Bow Street Police Court) and Police Station each became one of the most famous magistrates' courts and police stations in England.

Over the court's 266-year existence it occupied various buildings on Bow Street in Westminster, immediately north-east of Covent Garden, the last of which opened in 1881 and incorporated the police station previously on another site on the street. It closed in 2006 and its work moved to a set of four magistrates' courts: Westminster, Camberwell Green, Highbury Corner and the City of Westminster Magistrates' Court. The senior magistrate at Bow Street until 2000 was the Chief Metropolitan Stipendiary Magistrate.

The building is grade II listed, - the court areas now form a hotel and the station part houses the Bow Street Museum of Crime and Justice.

== History ==
=== 1740–1875 ===
The first court at Bow Street was established in 1740, when Colonel Sir Thomas de Veil, a Westminster justice, sat as a magistrate in his home at number 4. De Veil was succeeded by novelist and playwright Henry Fielding in 1747. He was appointed a magistrate for the City of Westminster in 1748, at a time when the problem of gin consumption and resultant crime was at its height. There were eight licensed premises in the street and Fielding reported that every fourth house in Covent Garden was a gin shop. In 1749, in response to calls to find an effective means to tackle increasing crime and disorder, Fielding brought together eight reliable constables, known as "Mr Fielding's People", who soon gained a reputation for honesty and efficiency in their pursuit of criminals. The constables came to be known as the Bow Street Runners.

Fielding's blind half-brother, Sir John Fielding (known as the "Blind Beak of Bow Street"), succeeded his brother as magistrate in 1754 and refined the patrol into the first truly effective police force for the capital. Among those tried at the court was Giacomo Casanova.

The early 19th century saw a dramatic increase in number and scope of the police based at Bow Street with the 1805 formation of the Bow Street Horse Patrole, which covered to the edge of London and was the first uniformed police unit in Britain, and in 1821 the Dismounted Horse Patrole which covered suburban areas. A Metropolitan Police station was also established at numbers 25 and 27 soon after the force was established in 1829. Officers were sent from there to police the Coldbath Fields riot in 1833.

=== 1876–1991: Court ===
Bow Street Police Court (Site) Act 1876
- Act of Parliament
- Parliament of the United Kingdom
- Long title: An Act to authorise the acquisition of a Site in Bow Street for the erection of a new Police Court and Police Station and offices.
- Citation: 39 & 40 Vict. c. ccxxxviii

Dates
- Royal assent: 15 August 1876

Text of statute as originally enacted

In 1876 the Duke of Bedford let a site on the eastern side of Bow Street to the Commissioners of HM Works and Public Buildings for a new combined magistrates' court and police station at an annual rent of £100. Work on the current building to a design by the Office of Works' surveyor Sir John Taylor began in 1878 and was completed in 1881—the date 1879 in the stonework above the door of the present building is when it had been hoped that work would finish. Historic England's listing entry describes the architectural style as "dignified, eclectic Graeco-Roman with some slightly Vanbrughian details, rather in the Pennethorne manner."

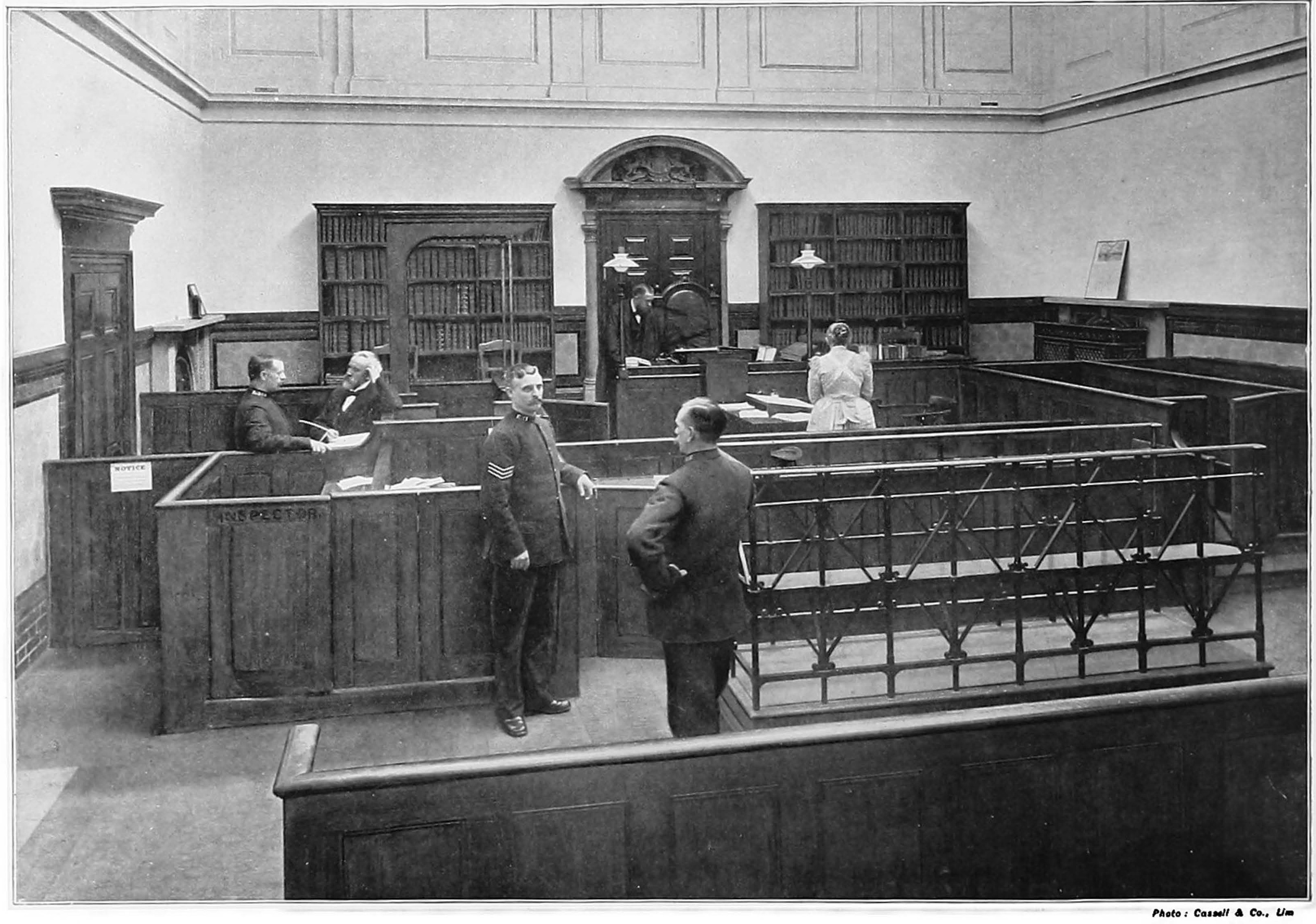
The Court in 1895

In 1878 gazetteer Walter Thornbury published that the establishment, still called generally a Magistrates' House, consisted of "three magistrates, each attending two days in a week". He added:

The chief magistrate has a large addition to his salary, in lieu of the fees taken at the office, which were formerly appropriated to his emolument, but are now carried to the public account. He also has £500 a year (equivalent to £50,396 in 2025) for the superintendence of the horse patrol. All the magistrates belonging to this office are in the Commission of the Peace for the Counties of Middlesex, Surrey, Kent, and Essex.

In its later years, the court housed the office of the Senior District Judge (Magistrates' Courts), who heard high-profile matters, such as extradition cases or those involving eminent public figures. Many famous accused people appeared in the court, often before committal for trial at the Central Criminal Court, Old Bailey or at other Crown Court centres, or when being held on extradition or terrorism charges. These included:

- Roger Casement
- Dr Crippen
- Abu Hamza al-Masri
- William Joyce
- The Kray twins
- Emmeline and Christabel Pankhurst
- General Pinochet
- John Cyril Porte
- Oscar Wilde

=== 1876–1992: Station ===
Meanwhile, the police station was highly active. Officers there went on strike in 1890, Marie Lloyd reported an assault there in 1892 and the station was threatened in the 1939 S-Plan terrorist campaign. Police from the station clashed with Commonwealth soldiers in 1919 and striking workers in 1931. Notable prisoners brought into its cells immediately after arrest included Clara Lambert, Cunninghame Graham MP and Bruno Manser, whilst noted officers there included Norwell Roberts, Robert Holmes, Yvonne Fletcher and future commissioners Joseph Simpson and Peter Imbert.

=== 1992–present ===
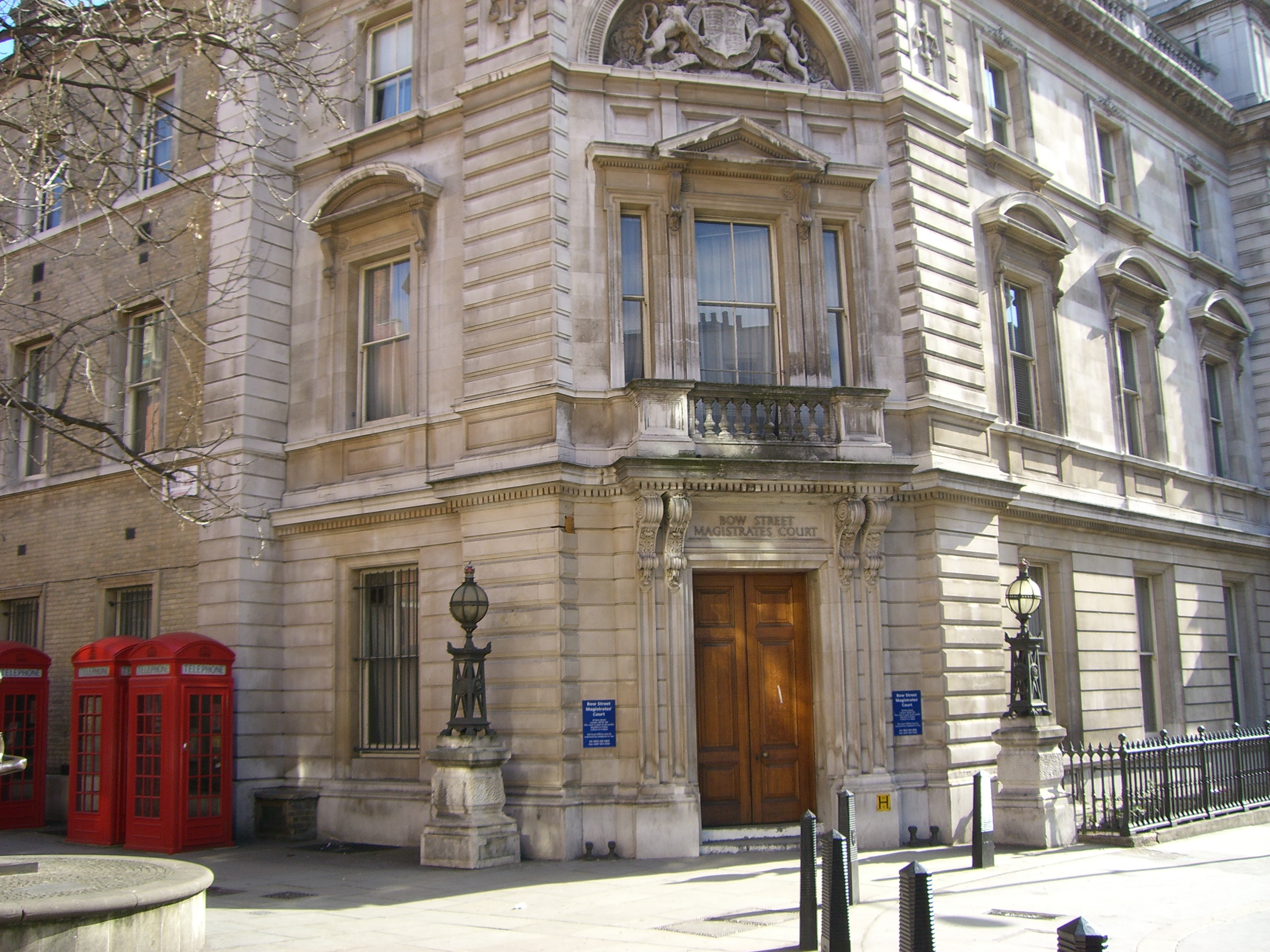
The court in 2006

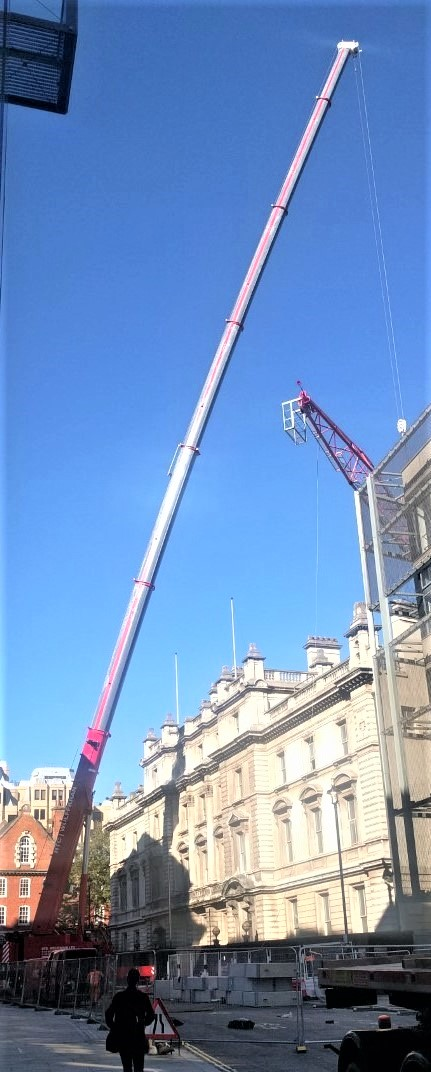
Redevelopment, October 2018

As part of the 1993 Covent Garden Festival a performance of Gilbert and Sullivan's Trial by Jury of 1875 took place in Court No. 1. The listed status of the building meant that it was not economic to update it to modern standards. It was accordingly considered for closure, enabling better use of a building that faces the front of the Royal Opera House. The police station closed in 1992, its area and that of Canon Row merging to form the area covered by the new Charing Cross Police Station. In 2004 the court was put up for sale by its joint owners, the Greater London Magistrates' Courts Authority and the Metropolitan Police Authority. In July 2005 the site was bought by property developer Gerry Barrett to convert into a boutique hotel, and the court closed on 14 July 2006.

The final case heard in the court was that of Jason John Handy, a 33-year-old alcoholic-vagrant who was accused of breaching his anti-social behaviour order. Other cases on the last day included beggars, shoplifters, illegal minicab drivers and a terrorist hearing – the first of its kind – in which a terror suspect was accused of breaching his control order. The final day was heavily attended by members of the press. The court's remaining cases moved to Horseferry Road Magistrates' Court which itself closed in 2011, when its work moved to the old Marylebone Court House and renamed Westminster Magistrates' Court.

In 2008 the Bow Street site was sold to Austrian developers who obtained planning permission for a hotel and police museum, while maintaining the facade of the old court building. In October 2016 the site was sold on again, to the UK arm of Qatari investment firm BTC, who used the existing planning permission. A 91-room hotel, run by the New York-based NoMad chain, opened in May 2021, as did a public restaurant and a museum of London police history.
