= Jubilee Market =

Market in Covent Garden, London, England

Coordinates: 51.5114°N 0.1223°W

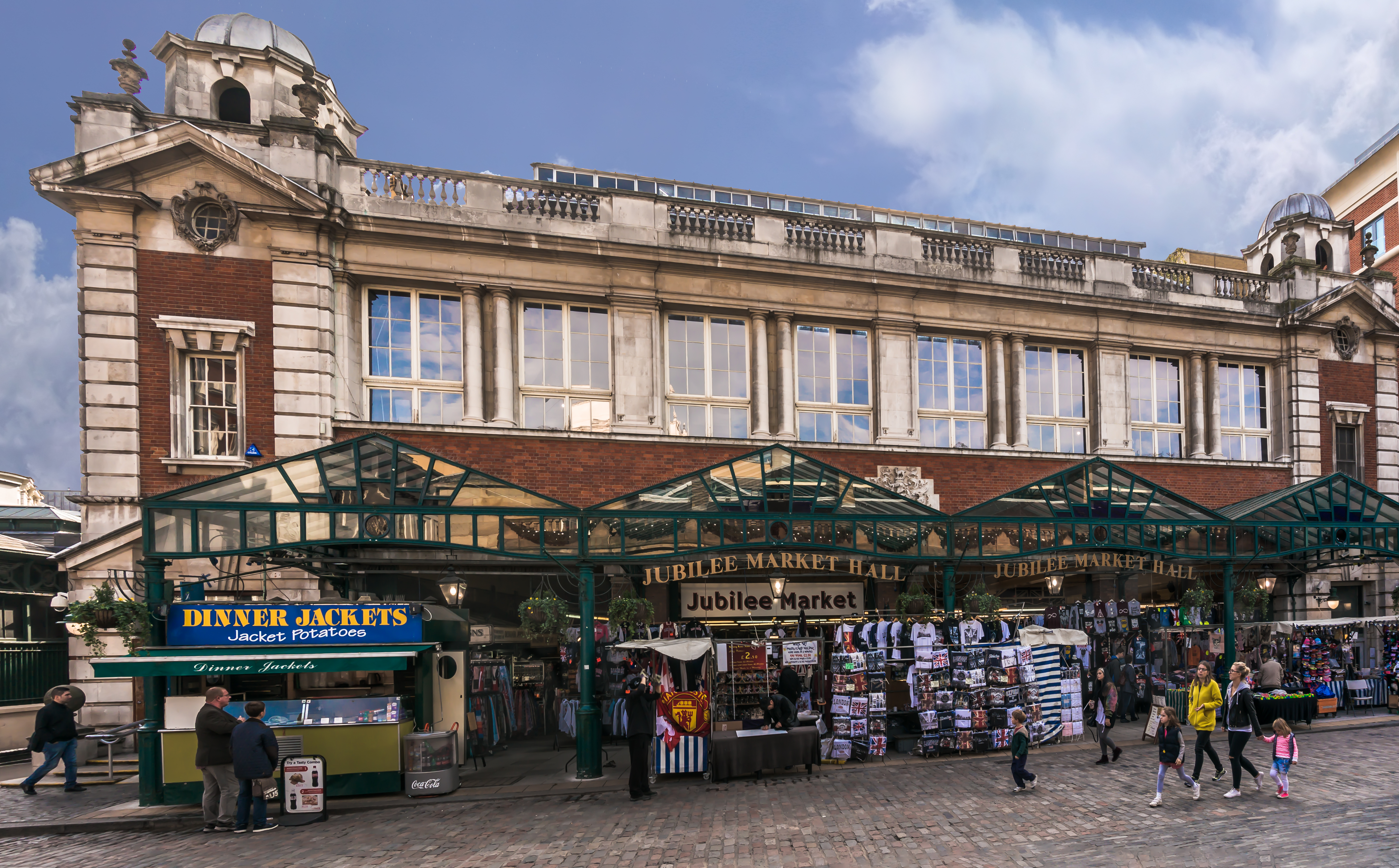
Jubilee Market

Jubilee Market is located in Jubilee Hall in Covent Garden, London.

The first market in Covent Garden piazza took place in 1654, and Jubilee Market was built in 1904, covering Tavistock Street, named after the then Duke of Bedford, Marquess of Tavistock. It is the only market in London to be wholly owned by traders, who took over the market to save it from bankruptcy. After a major renovation of the market itself, beginning in 1985 and lasting two years, Jubilee Market was opened by Queen Elizabeth II on 5 August 1987, as commemorated by a headstone in the façade of the market.

The market changes its wares during the week. Monday is entirely devoted to antiques, Tuesday to Thursday is the general market, while Saturday and Sunday are dedicated to arts and crafts items.
