= Metropolitan Police strike of 1890 =

The Metropolitan Police strike of 1890 was a work stoppage by officers of the Metropolitan Police Service in London, in July 1890 over low police pensions.

== Course ==
Parliament created a Police Pensions Bill, whose text was published in June 1890. A meeting in mid-June considered the Bill and drew up a circular calling on officers not to resume work on 20 June. Commissioner Edward Bradford refused to meet officers' representatives requesting a negotiating body on 5 July and that night 130 officers refused to go on duty. On 6 July, Bradford dismissed 39 of these and transferred the others to different divisions. Those 39 men met at the Sun Tavern in Long Acre on 7 July and together wrote a telegram to the Home Secretary demanding their reinstatement and threatening a full police strike if this did not occur. A large crowd of riotous onlookers outside Bow Street Police Station had to be controlled by mounted police and a detachment of the 2nd Life Guards, but the full strike did not materialize and by Tuesday 8 July all officers besides the 39 men were back on patrol.
