= Covent Garden =

District in London, England

Coordinates: 51.5125°N 0.1225°W

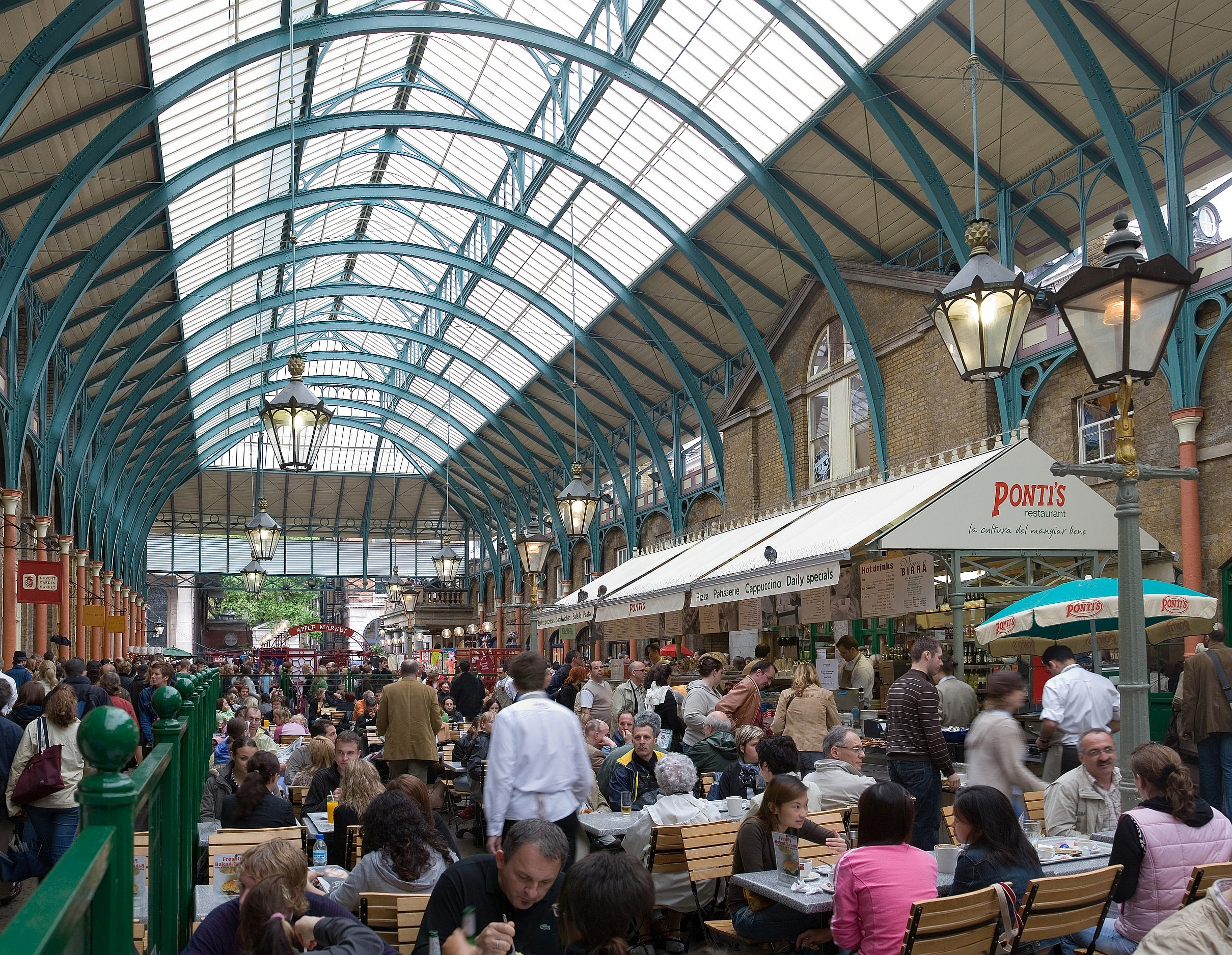
- Interior of the former vegetable market, 2006

- Location within Greater London
- OS grid reference: TQ303809
- London borough: Westminster; Camden
- Ceremonial county: Greater London
- Region: London
- Country: England
- Sovereign state: United Kingdom
- Post town: London
- Postcode district: WC2
- Police: Metropolitan
- Fire: London
- Ambulance: London
- UK Parliament: Cities of London and Westminster; Holborn and St Pancras
- London Assembly: West Central; Barnet and Camden

Covent Garden is a district in London, on the eastern fringes of the West End, between St Martin's Lane and Drury Lane. It is associated with the former fruit-and-vegetable market in the central square, now a popular shopping and tourist site, and with the Royal Opera House, itself known as "Covent Garden". The district is divided by the main thoroughfare of Long Acre, north of which is given over to independent shops centred on Neal's Yard and Seven Dials, while the south contains the central square with its street performers and most of the historical buildings, theatres and entertainment facilities, including the London Transport Museum and the Theatre Royal, Drury Lane.

The area was fields until briefly settled in the 7th century when it became the heart of the Anglo-Saxon trading town of Lundenwic, then abandoned at the end of the 9th century after which it returned to fields. By 1200 part of it had been walled off by the Abbot of Westminster Abbey for use as arable land and orchards, later referred to as "the garden of the Abbey and Convent", and later "the Convent Garden". Following the Dissolution of the Monasteries it was granted in 1552 by the young King Edward VI to John Russell, 1st Earl of Bedford (c.1485–1555), the trusted adviser to his father King Henry VIII. The 4th Earl commissioned Inigo Jones to build some fine houses to attract wealthy tenants. Jones designed the Italianate arcaded square along with the church of St Paul's. The design of the square was new to London and had a significant influence on modern town planning, acting as the prototype for new estates as London grew.

By 1654, a small open-air fruit-and-vegetable market had developed on the south side of the fashionable square. Gradually, both the market and the surrounding area fell into disrepute, as taverns, theatres, coffee houses and brothels opened up. By the 18th century it had become notorious for its abundance of brothels. An act of Parliament was drawn up in 1813 to control the area, and Charles Fowler's neo-classical building was erected in 1830 to cover and help organise the market. The market grew and further buildings were added: the Floral Hall, Charter Market, and in 1904 the Jubilee Market. By the end of the 1960s traffic congestion was causing problems, and in 1974 the market relocated to the New Covent Garden Market about three miles (5 km) southwest at Nine Elms. The central building re-opened as a shopping centre in 1980 and is now a tourist location containing cafes, pubs, small shops, and a craft market called the Apple Market, along with another market held in the Jubilee Hall.

Covent Garden falls within the London boroughs of Westminster and Camden and the parliamentary constituencies of Cities of London and Westminster and Holborn and St Pancras. The area has been served by the Piccadilly line at Covent Garden tube station since 1907; the 300-yard (270 m) journey from Leicester Square tube station is the shortest in London. The side of Covent Garden that lies in the City of Westminster is a district of Westminster.

== History ==
=== Early history ===
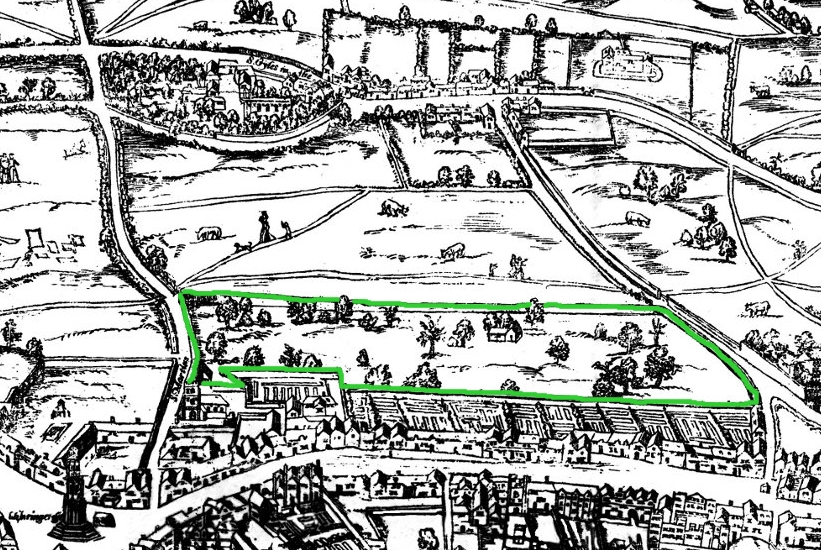
Covent Garden on the "Woodcut" map of the 1560s, with surrounding wall marked in green

During the Roman period, what is now the Strand – running along the southern boundary of the area that was to become the "Covent Garden" – was part of the route to Silchester, known as "Iter VII" on the Antonine Itinerary. Excavations in 2006 at St Martin-in-the-Fields revealed a group of late Roman graves, suggesting the site had been sacred since at least 350 AD. The area to the north of the Strand was long thought to have remained as unsettled fields until the 16th century, but theories by Alan Vince and Martin Biddle that there had been an Anglo-Saxon settlement to the west of the old Roman town of Londinium were borne out by excavations in 1985 and 2005. These revealed that a trading town, called Lundenwic, developed around 600 AD, stretching from Trafalgar Square to Aldwych, with Covent Garden at the centre. Alfred the Great gradually shifted the settlement into the old Roman town of Londinium from around 886 AD onwards, leaving no mark of the old town, and the site returned to fields.

The first mention of a walled garden comes from a document, c. 1200 AD, detailing land owned by the Benedictine monks of the Abbey of St Peter, Westminster. A later document, dated between 1250 and 1283, refers to "the garden of the Abbot and Convent of Westminster". By the 13th century this had become a 40-acre (16 ha) quadrangle of mixed orchard, meadow, pasture and arable land, lying between modern-day St Martin's Lane and Drury Lane, and Floral Street and Maiden Lane. The use of the name "Covent"—an Anglo-French term for a religious community, equivalent to "monastery" or "convent"—appears in a document in 1515, when the Abbey, which had been letting out parcels of land along the north side of the Strand for inns and market gardens, granted a lease of the walled garden, referring to it as "a garden called Covent Garden". This is how it was recorded from then on.

=== Bedford Estate (1552–1918) ===
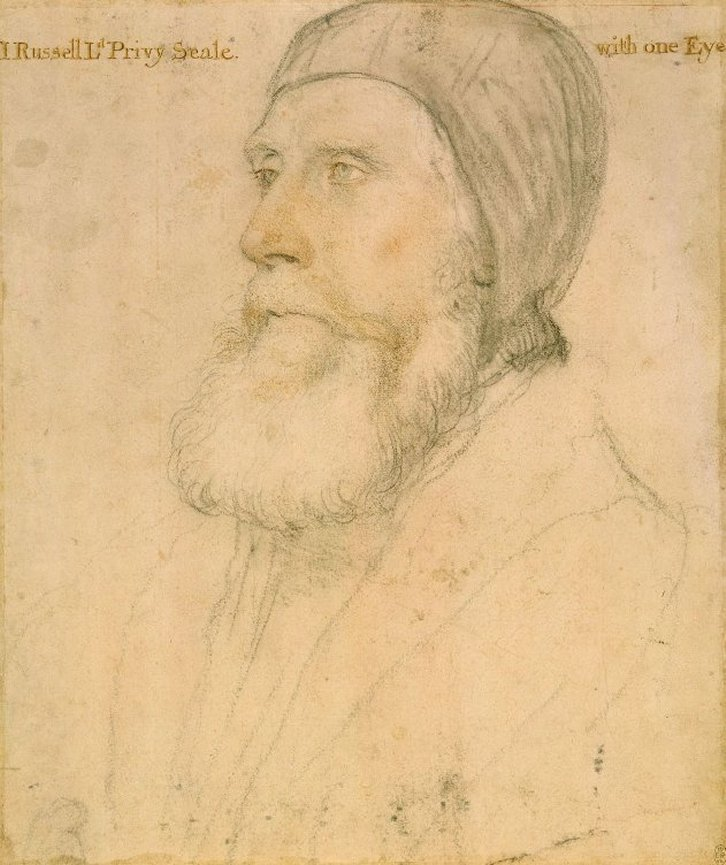
The Earl of Bedford was given Covent Garden in 1552.

Following the Dissolution of the monasteries in 1540 under King Henry VIII, monastic lands in England reverted to the crown, including lands belonging to Westminster Abbey such as the Convent Garden and seven acres to the north called Long Acre. In 1552 King Edward VI granted it to John Russell, 1st Earl of Bedford, his late father's trusted adviser. The Russell family, who in 1694 were advanced in the peerage from Earl to Duke of Bedford, held the land until 1918.

Russell built Bedford House and garden on part of the land, with an entrance on the Strand, the large garden stretching back along the south side of the old walled-off convent garden. In 1630 Francis Russell, 4th Earl of Bedford commissioned the architect Inigo Jones to design and build a church and three terraces of fine houses around a large square or piazza. This had been prompted by King Charles I having taken offence at the poor condition of the road and houses along Long Acre, which were the responsibility of Russell and Henry Carey, 2nd Earl of Monmouth. Russell and Carey complained that under the 1625 Proclamation concerning Buildings, which restricted building in and around London, they could not build new houses. For a fee of £2,000, the King then granted Russell a licence to build as many new houses on his land as he "shall thinke fitt and convenient".

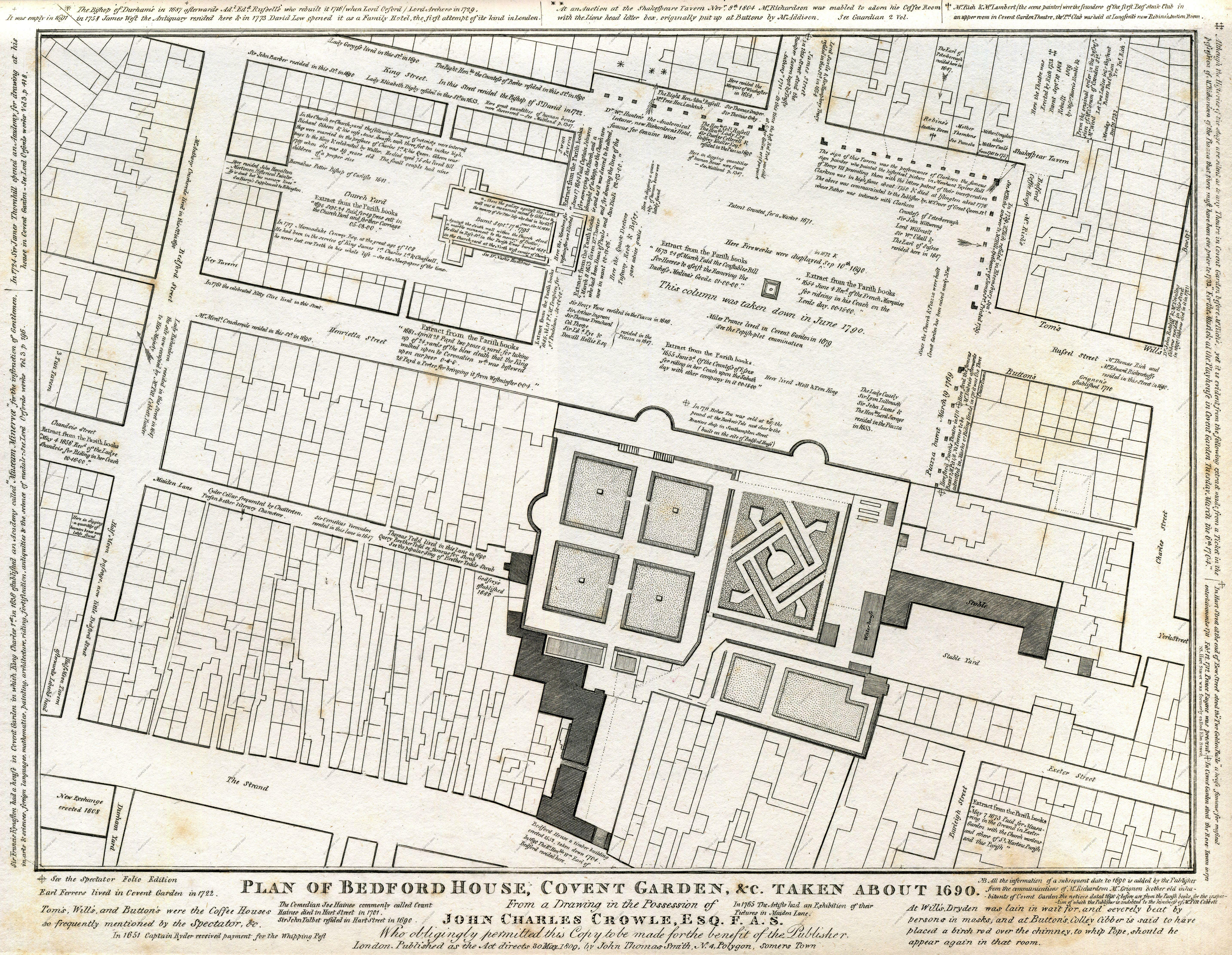
Plan of Covent Garden in 1690

The houses initially attracted the wealthy, although they moved out when a market developed on the south side of the square around 1654, and coffee houses, taverns, and prostitutes moved in.

The Bedford Estate was expanded by the inheritance of the former manor of Bloomsbury to the immediate north of Covent Garden following the marriage of William Russell, Lord Russell (1639–1683) (third son of William Russell, 1st Duke of Bedford of Woburn Abbey in Bedfordshire) to Rachel Wriothesley, heiress of Bloomsbury, younger of the two daughters and co-heiresses of Thomas Wriothesley, 4th Earl of Southampton (1607-1667). Rachel's son and heir was Wriothesley Russell, 2nd Duke of Bedford (1680–1711).

By the 18th century, Covent Garden had become a well-known red-light district, attracting notable prostitutes such as Betty Careless and Jane Douglas. Descriptions of the prostitutes and where to find them were provided by Harris's List of Covent Garden Ladies, the "essential guide and accessory for any serious gentleman of pleasure". In 1830 a market hall was built to provide a more permanent trading centre. In 1913 Herbrand Russell, 11th Duke of Bedford agreed to sell the Covent Garden Estate for £2 million to the MP and land speculator Harry Mallaby-Deeley, who sold his option in 1918 to the Beecham family for £250,000.

=== Modern changes ===
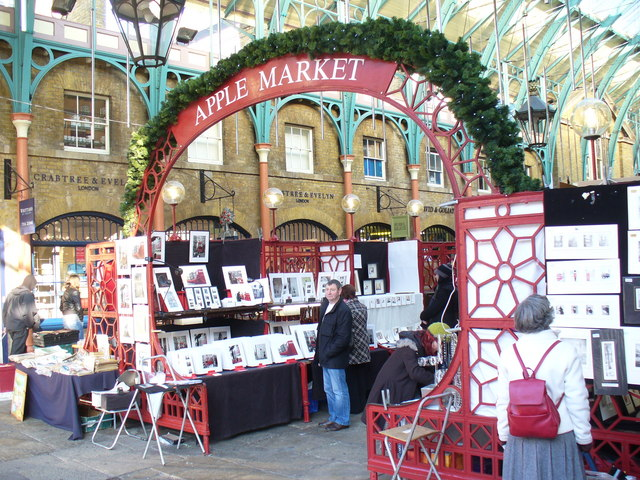
Charles Fowler's 1830 neo-classical building restored as a retail market

The Covent Garden Estate was part of Beecham Estates and Pills Limited from 1924 to 1928, after which it was managed by a successor company called Covent Garden Properties, owned by the Beechams and other private investors. This new company sold some properties at Covent Garden, while becoming active in property investment in other parts of London. In 1962 the bulk of the remaining properties in the Covent Garden area, including the market, were sold to the newly established government-owned Covent Garden Authority for £3,925,000.

By the end of the 1960s, traffic congestion had reached such a level that the use of the square as a modern wholesale distribution market was becoming untenable, and significant redevelopment was planned, with an international conference centre to be built on the piazza and the central building being converted for other uses. Following a public outcry, buildings around the square were protected in 1973, preventing redevelopment. The following year the market moved to a new site in Nine Elms, between Battersea and Vauxhall in southwest London. The square languished until its central building re-opened as a shopping centre in 1980.

After consulting with residents and local businesses, Westminster Council drew up an action plan to improve the area while retaining its historic character in 2004. The market buildings, along with several other properties in Covent Garden, were bought by a property company in 2006.

== Geography ==
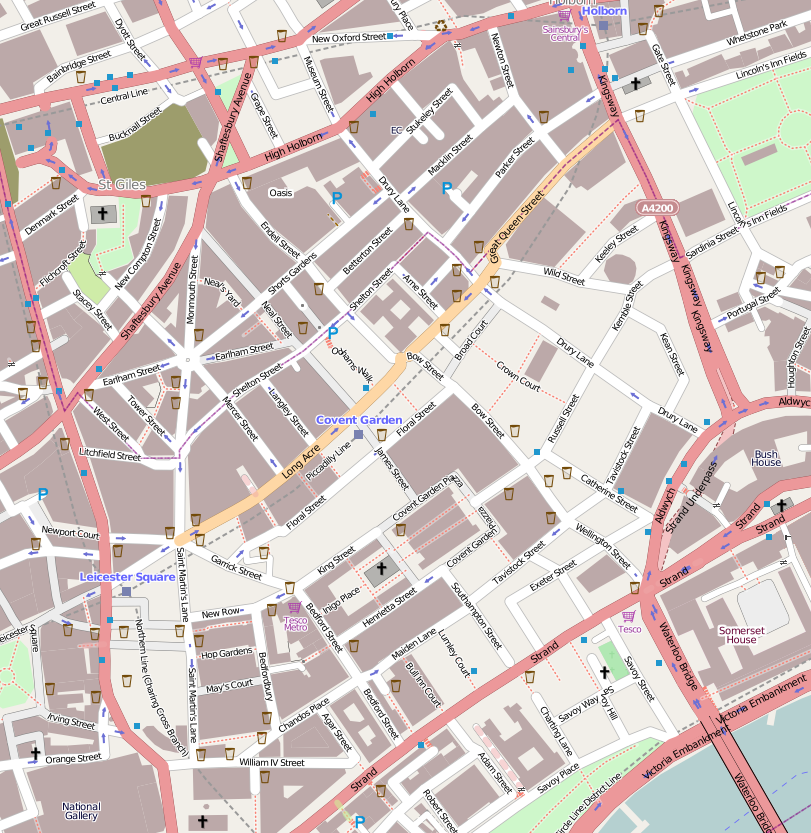
OpenStreetMap of the area

Historically, the Bedford Estate defined the boundary of Covent Garden, with Drury Lane to the east, the Strand to the south, St Martin's Lane to the west, and Long Acre to the north. However, over time the area regarded as part of Covent Garden has expanded northwards past Long Acre to High Holborn. Since 1971, with the creation of the Covent Garden Conservation Area which incorporated part of the area between St Martin's Lane and Charing Cross Road, Charing Cross Road has sometimes been taken as its western boundary. Long Acre is the main thoroughfare, running north-east from St Martin's Lane to Drury Lane. Shelton Street, running parallel to the north of Long Acre, marks the London borough boundary between Camden and Westminster.

The area to the south of Long Acre contains the Royal Opera House, the market and central square, and most of the elegant buildings, theatres and entertainment facilities, including the Theatre Royal, Drury Lane, and the London Transport Museum; while the area to the north of Long Acre is largely given over to independent retail units centred on Neal Street, Neal's Yard and Seven Dials; though this area also contains residential buildings such as Odhams Walk, built in 1981 on the site of the Odhams print works, and is home to 7,000 residents.

For a list of street name etymologies in Covent Garden see: Street names of Covent Garden.

== Governance ==
The Covent Garden estate was originally under the control of Westminster Abbey and lay in the parish of St Margaret. During a reorganisation in 1542 it was transferred to St Martin in the Fields, and then in 1645 a new parish was created, splitting governance of the estate between the parishes of St Paul Covent Garden and St Martin, both still within the Liberty of Westminster. St Paul Covent Garden was completely surrounded by the parish of St Martin in the Fields. It was grouped into the Strand District in 1855. In 1900 it became part of the Metropolitan Borough of Westminster and was abolished as a civil parish in 1922. The northern reaches of Covent Garden were within the ancient parish of St Giles in the Fields and outside the Liberty of Westminster. They were from 1855 to 1900 part of the St Giles District and from 1900 part of the Metropolitan Borough of Holborn.

Covent Garden came within the area of responsibility of the Metropolitan Board of Works from 1855 and in 1889 became part of the County of London. Since 1965 Covent Garden falls within the London boroughs of Westminster and Camden, and is in the Parliamentary constituencies of Cities of London and Westminster and Holborn and St Pancras. For local council elections it falls within the St James's ward for Westminster, and the Holborn and Covent Garden ward for Camden.

== Economy ==
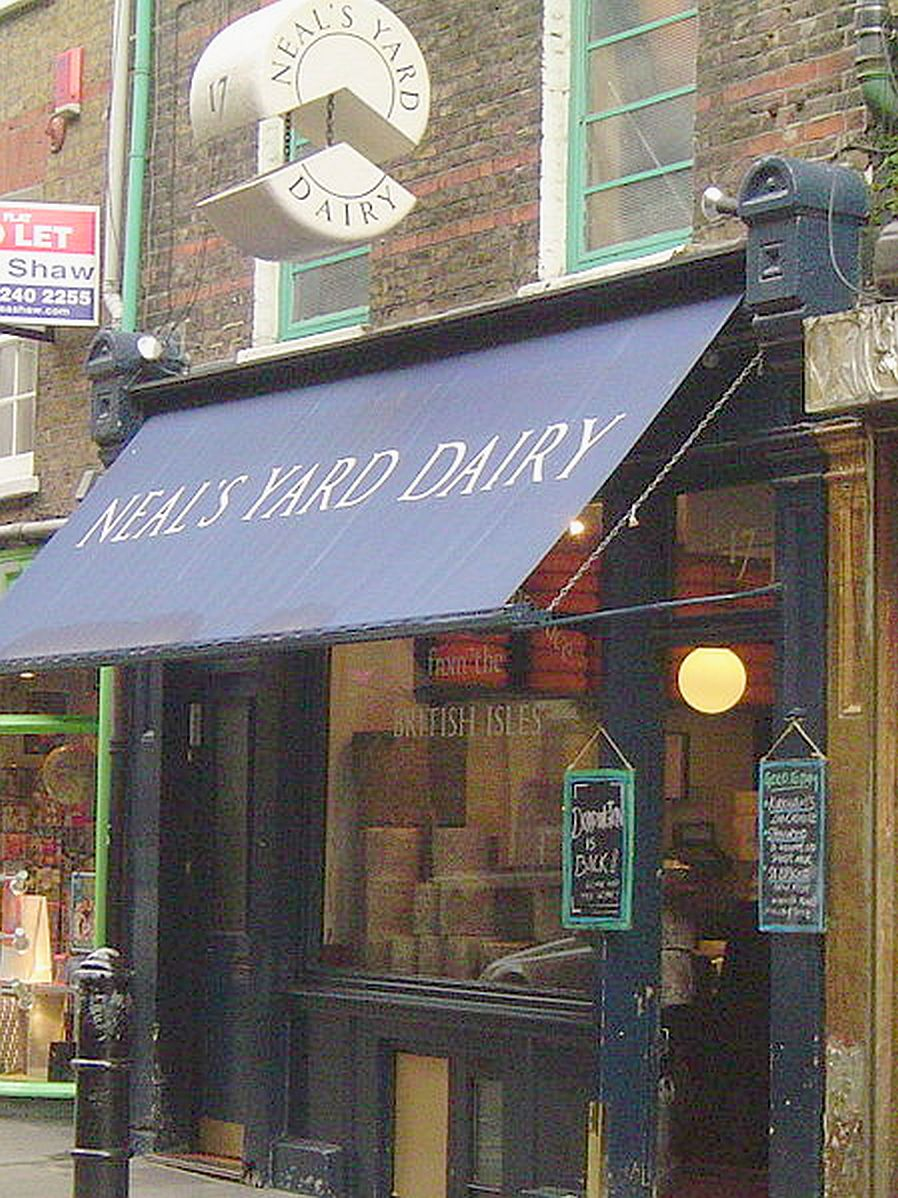
Neal's Yard Dairy, a well-known cheese shop

Covent Garden Market reopened in 1980 as a shopping arcade with restaurants and a pub. The central hall has shops, cafes and bars alongside the Apple Market stalls selling antiques, jewellery, clothing and gifts; there are additional casual stalls in the Jubilee Hall Market on the south side of the square. In 2010, what was then the largest Apple Store in the world opened in The Piazza. Long Acre has clothes shops and boutiques, and Neal Street is noted for its numerous shoe shops. London Transport Museum and the side entrance to the Royal Opera House box office and other facilities are also located on the square. During the late 1970s and 1980s the Rock Garden music venue was popular with up-and-coming punk rock and new wave artists.

The market halls and several other buildings in Covent Garden were bought by Capital & Counties Properties (now known as Shaftesbury Capital) in partnership with GE Real Estate in August 2006 for £421 million, on a 150-year head lease. The buildings are let to the Covent Garden Area Trust, who pay an annual peppercorn rent of one red apple and a posy of flowers for each head lease, and the Trust protects the property from being redeveloped. In March 2007 CapCo also acquired the shops located under the Royal Opera House. The complete Covent Garden Estate owned by CapCo consists of 550,000 sq ft (51,000 m^{2}), and, as of 2025, has a market value of £2.7 billion.

== Landmarks ==
=== Royal Opera House ===
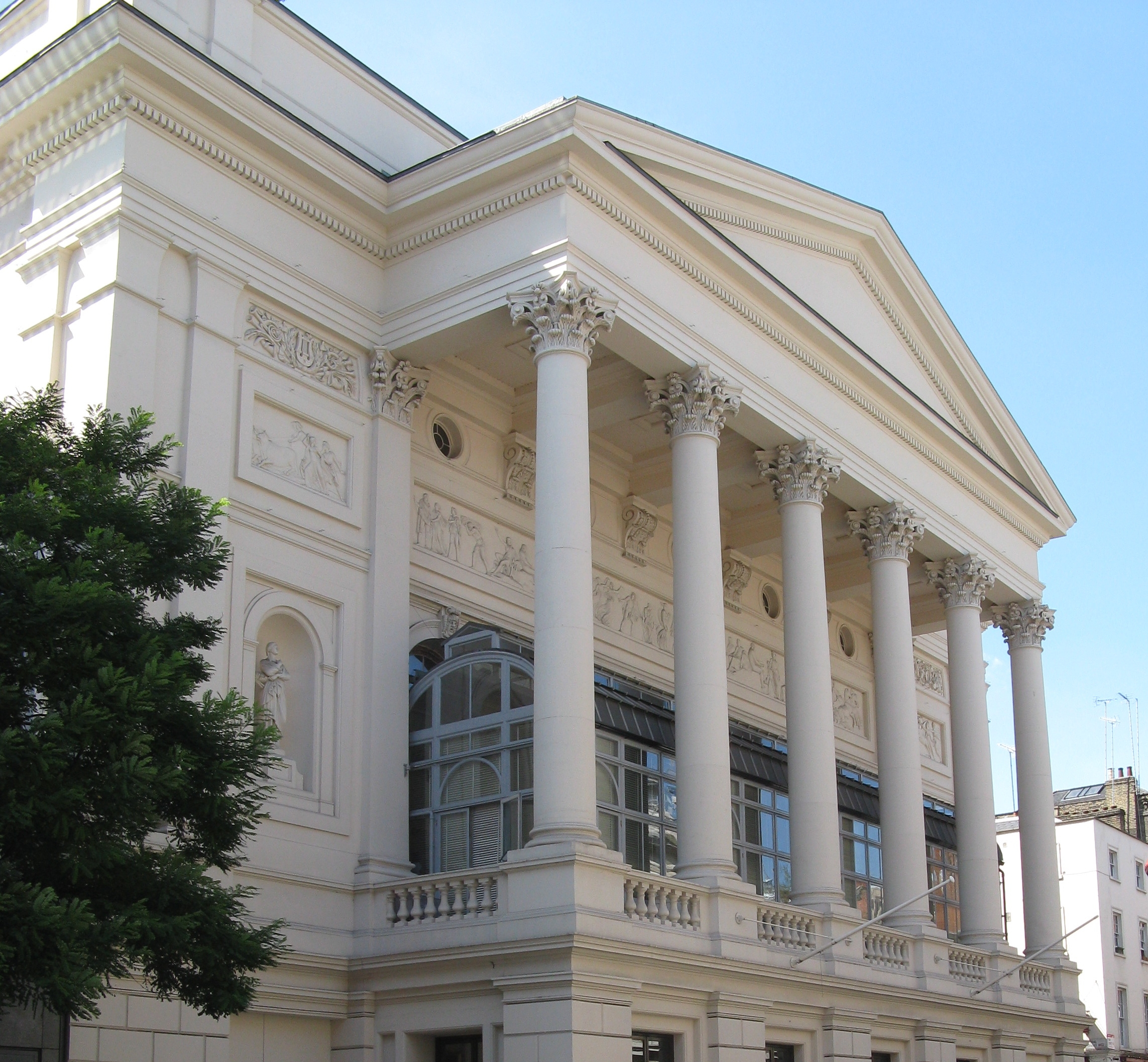
Edward Barry's 1858 façade of the Royal Opera House

The Royal Opera House, known as "Covent Garden", was constructed as the "Theatre Royal" in 1732 to a design by Edward Shepherd. During the first hundred years or so of its history, the theatre was primarily a playhouse, with the Letters Patent granted by Charles II giving Covent Garden and Theatre Royal, Drury Lane, exclusive rights to present spoken drama in London. In 1734, the first ballet was presented; a year later Handel's first season of operas began. Many of his operas and oratorios were specifically written for Covent Garden and had their premières here. It has been the home of The Royal Opera since 1945, and the Royal Ballet since 1946.

The current building is the third theatre on the site following destructive fires in 1808 and 1857. The façade, foyer and auditorium were designed by Edward Barry, and date from 1858, but almost every other element of the present complex dates from an extensive £178 million reconstruction in the 1990s. The main auditorium is a Grade I listed building. The inclusion of the adjacent old Floral Hall, previously a part of the old Covent Garden Market, created a large new public gathering place. In 1779 the pavement outside the playhouse was the scene of the murder of Martha Ray, mistress of the Earl of Sandwich, by her admirer the Rev. James Hackman.

=== Covent Garden Piazza ===
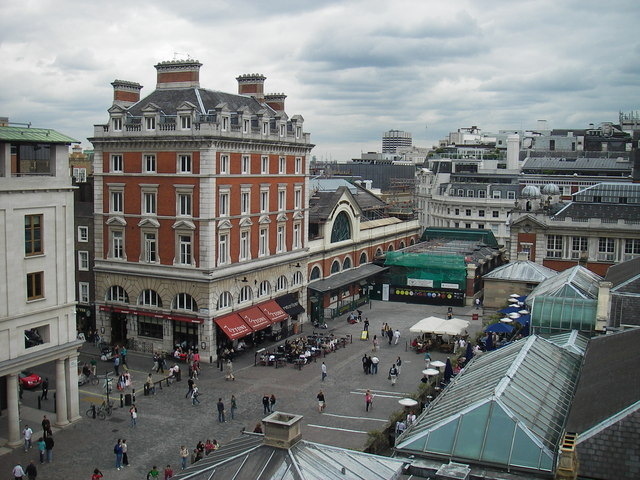
Covent Garden Piazza

The central square in Covent Garden is simply called "Covent Garden", often marketed as "Covent Garden Piazza" to distinguish it from the eponymous surrounding area. Designed and laid out in 1630, it was the first modern square in London—originally a flat, open space or piazza with low railings. From about 1635 onwards there were many private residents of note, including the nobility, living in the Great Piazza. A casual market started on the south side, and by 1830 the present market hall had been built. The space is popular with street performers, who audition with the site's owners for an allocated slot. The square was originally laid out when the 4th Earl of Bedford, Francis Russell, commissioned Inigo Jones to design and build a church and three terraces of fine houses around the site of a former walled garden belonging to Westminster Abbey. Jones's design was informed by his knowledge of modern town planning in Europe, particularly Piazza d'Arme, in Leghorn, Tuscany, Piazza San Marco in Venice, Piazza Santissima Annunziata in Florence, and the Place des Vosges in Paris. The centrepiece of the project was the large square, the concept of which was new to London, and this had a significant influence on modern town planning as the metropolis grew, acting as the prototype for the design of new estates, such as the Ladbroke Estate and the Grosvenor Estate. Isaac de Caus, the French Huguenot architect, designed the individual houses under Jones's overall design.

The church of St Paul's was the first building and was begun in July 1631 on the western side of the square. The last house was completed in 1637. Seventeen of the houses had arcaded portico walks organised in groups of four and six either side of James Street on the north side, and three and four either side of Russell Street. These arcades, rather than the square itself, took the name Piazza; the group from James Street to Russell Street became known as the "Great Piazza" and that to the south of Russell Street as the "Little Piazza". None of Inigo Jones's houses remains, though part of the north group was reconstructed in 1877–79 as Bedford Chambers by William Cubitt to a design by Henry Clutton.

=== Covent Garden market ===
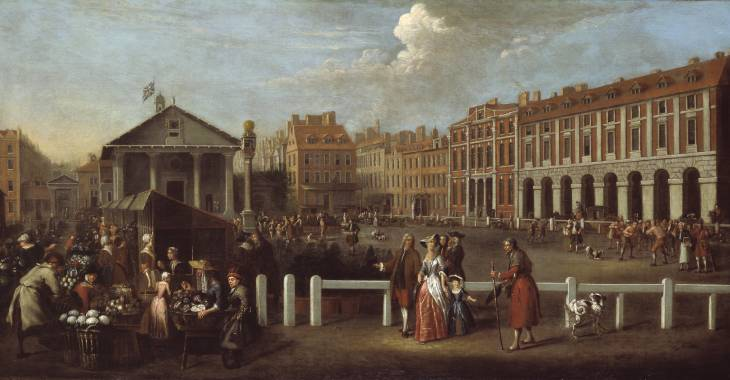
Balthazar Nebot's 1737 painting of the square before the 1830 market hall was constructed

The first record of a "new market in Covent Garden" is in 1654 when market traders set up stalls against the garden wall of Bedford House. The Earl of Bedford acquired a private charter from Charles II in 1670 for a fruit and vegetable market, permitting him and his heirs to hold a market every day except Sundays and Christmas Day. The original market, consisting of wooden stalls and sheds, became disorganised and disorderly, and John Russell, 6th Duke of Bedford, requested an act of Parliament, the Covent Garden Market Act 1813 (53 Geo. 3. c. lxxi), to regulate it, then commissioned Charles Fowler in 1830 to design the neo-classical market building that is the heart of Covent Garden today. The "greater part of the pillars" were built from granite quarried from Cairngall in today's Aberdeenshire. The contractor was William Cubitt and Company. Further buildings were added—the Floral hall, Charter Market, and in 1904 the Jubilee Market for foreign flowers was built by Cubitt and Howard.

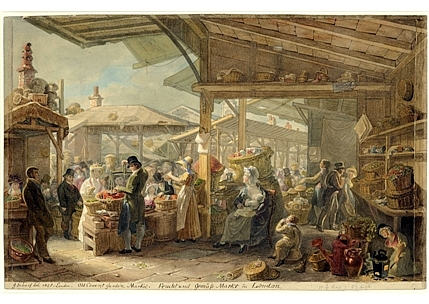
George Johann Scharf's illustration of the market before Fowler's hall was built in 1830

By the end of the 1960s, traffic congestion was causing problems for the market, which required increasingly large lorries for deliveries and distribution. The redevelopment was considered, but protests from the Covent Garden Community Association in 1973 prompted the Home Secretary, Robert Carr, to give dozens of buildings around the square listed-building status, preventing redevelopment. The following year the market relocated to its new site, New Covent Garden Market, about three miles (5 km) south-west at Nine Elms. The central building re-opened as a shopping centre in 1980, with cafes, pubs, small shops and a craft market called the Apple Market. Among the first shops to relocate here was Benjamin Pollock's Toy Shop. Another market, the Jubilee Market, is held in the Jubilee Hall on the south side of the square. The market halls and several other buildings in Covent Garden have been owned by the property company Capital & Counties Properties (CapCo) since 2006. In 1980 the London Transport Museum opened in part of the old flower market buildings, and these were refurbished in around 2005 to re-open in 2007.

=== Theatre Royal, Drury Lane ===
Interior of the Drury Lane Theatre by Pugin and Rowlandson, 1808

The current Theatre Royal on Drury Lane is the most recent of four incarnations, the first of which opened in 1663, making it the oldest continuously used theatre in London. For much of its first two centuries, it was, along with the Royal Opera House, a patent theatre granted rights in London for the production of drama, and had a claim to be one of London's leading theatres. The first theatre, known as "Theatre Royal, Bridges Street", saw performances by Nell Gwyn and Charles Hart. After it was destroyed by fire in 1672, English dramatist and theatre manager Thomas Killigrew constructed a larger theatre on the same spot, which opened in 1674. Killigrew's theatre lasted nearly 120 years, under leadership including Colley Cibber, David Garrick, and Richard Brinsley Sheridan. In 1791, under Sheridan's management, the building was demolished to make way for a larger theatre which opened in 1794. However, that survived only 15 years, burning down in 1809. The building that stands today opened in 1812. It has been home to actors as diverse as Shakespearean actor Edmund Kean, child actress Clara Fisher, comedian Dan Leno, the comedy troupe Monty Python (who recorded a concert album there), and musical composer and performer Ivor Novello. Since November 2008 the theatre has been owned by composer Andrew Lloyd Webber and generally stages popular musical theatre. It is a Grade I listed building.

=== London Transport Museum ===
The London Transport Museum is in a Victorian iron and glass building on the east side of the market square. It was designed as a dedicated flower market by William Rogers of William Cubitt and Company in 1871, and was first occupied by the museum in 1980. Previously the transport collection had been held at Syon Park and Clapham. The first parts of the collection were brought together at the beginning of the 20th century by the London General Omnibus Company (LGOC) when it began to preserve buses being retired from service. After the LGOC was taken over by the London Electric Railway (LER), the collection was expanded to include rail vehicles. It continued to expand after the LER became part of the London Passenger Transport Board in the 1930s and as the organisation passed through various successor bodies up to TfL, London's transport authority since 2000. The Covent Garden building has on display many examples of buses, trams, trolleybuses and rail vehicles from the 19th and 20th centuries as well as artefacts and exhibits related to the operation and marketing of passenger services and the impact that the developing transport network has had on the city and its population.

=== St Paul's Church ===
St Paul's, commonly known as the Actors' Church, was built in 1633, at a cost of £4,000, though was not consecrated until 1638. In 1645 Covent Garden was made a separate parish and the church was dedicated to St Paul. How much of Jones's original building is left is unclear, as the church was damaged by fire in 1795 during restoration work by Thomas Hardwick; the columns are thought to be original but the rest is mostly Georgian or Victorian reconstruction.

=== Bow Street Magistrates' Court building ===
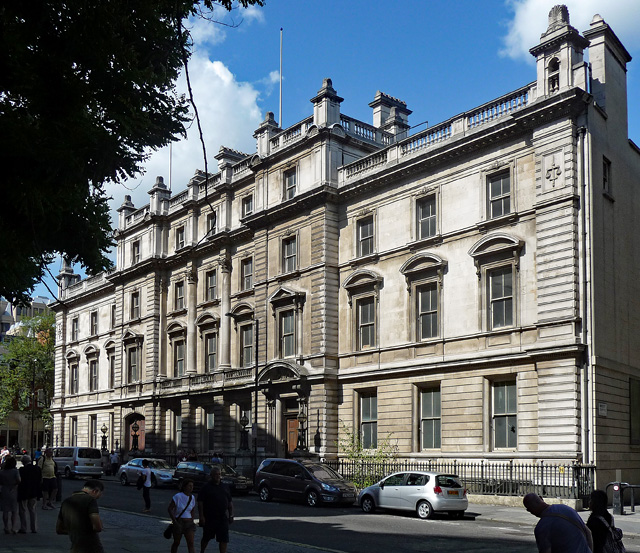
Magistrates Court building in 2013

The building, opposite the Royal Opera House, was opened in 1881 to house both a Magistrates' Court and a police station. As well as dealing with local petty criminals, a number of high-profile defendants appeared in the court, including Oscar Wilde, Dr Crippen and the Kray twins, and those facing extradition proceedings, such as Augusto Pinochet and James Earl Ray.

The police station closed in 1992, with its work moving to the more modern Charing Cross police station. The court building's Grade II listed status meant it was not economic to update it to modern standards and the court closed in July 2006. Sold to developers, planning permission was obtained to convert the building into a hotel and museum. A 91-room hotel and a public restaurant, run by the New York based NoMad chain, opened in May 2021, as did a museum of local police history in the former police station.

=== Freemasons' Hall ===
Freemasons' Hall is the headquarters of the United Grand Lodge of England and the Supreme Grand Chapter of Royal Arch Masons of England, as well as a meeting place for many Masonic Lodges in the London area. It is in Great Queen Street between Holborn and Covent Garden and has been a Masonic meeting place since 1775. Parts of the building are open to the public daily, and its preserved classic Art Deco style, together with its regular use as a film and television location, have made it a tourist destination.

== Culture ==
The Covent Garden area has long been associated with entertainment and shopping. Covent Garden has 13 theatres, and over 60 pubs and bars, with most south of Long Acre, around the main shopping area of the old market. The Seven Dials area in the north of Covent Garden was home to the punk rock club The Roxy in 1977, and the area remains focused on young people with its trendy mid-market retail outlets. From 1996 to 2001 there was a "Covent Garden Festival", which had opera and drama performances at venues such as Bow Street Magistrates' Court, and the piazza

=== Street performance ===
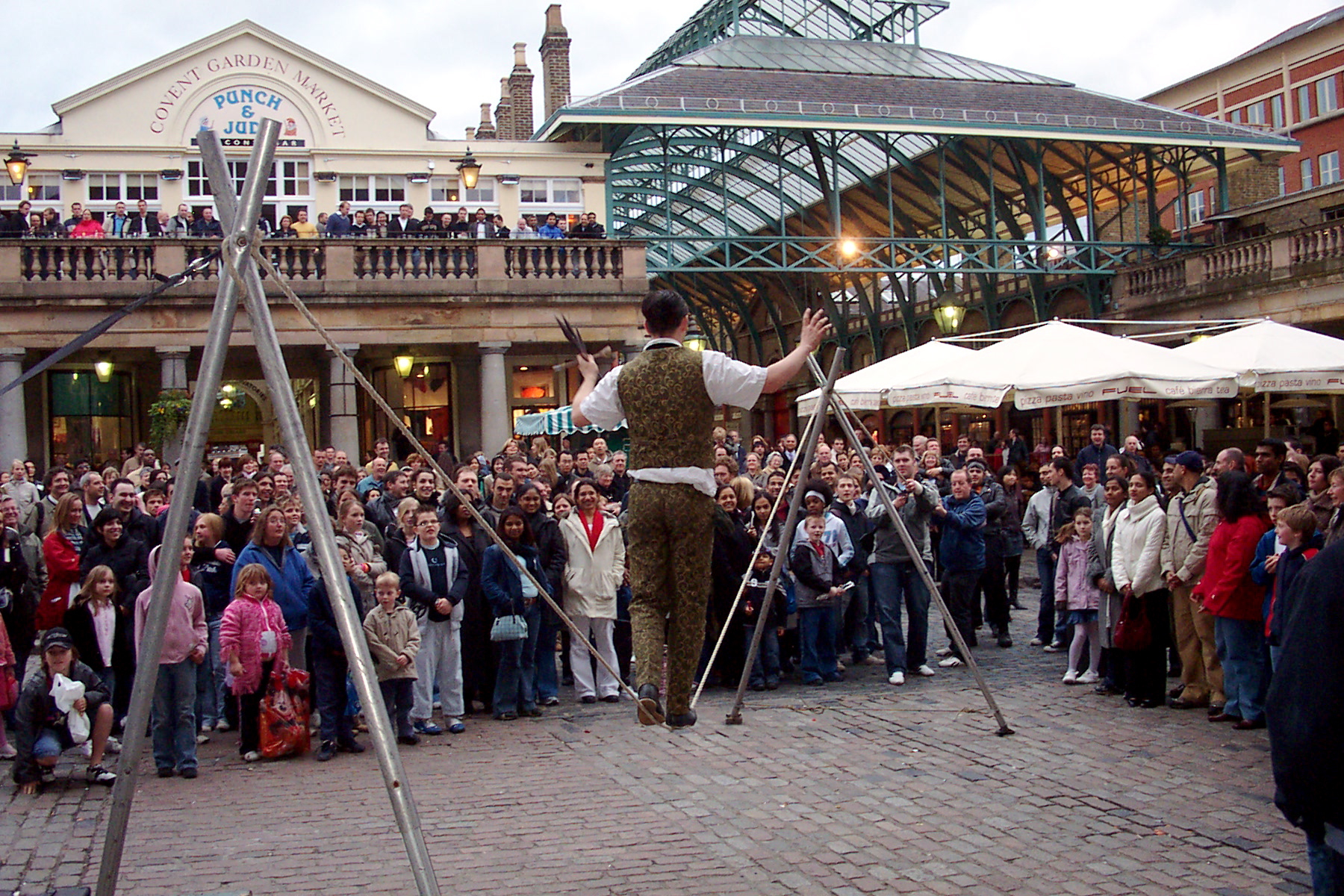
Street entertainment in Covent Garden Market, April 2005

Street entertainment at Covent Garden was noted in Samuel Pepys's diary in May 1662, when he recorded the first mention of a Punch and Judy show in Britain. Impromptu performances of song and swimming were given by local celebrity William Cussans in the eighteenth century. Covent Garden is licensed for street entertainment, and performers audition for timetabled slots in a number of venues around the market, including the North Hall, West Piazza, and South Hall Courtyard. The courtyard space is dedicated to classical music only.

There are street performances at Covent Garden Market every day of the year, except Christmas Day. Shows run throughout the day and are about 30 minutes in length. In March 2008, the market owner, CapCo, proposed to reduce street performances to one 30-minute show each hour.

=== Pubs and bars ===
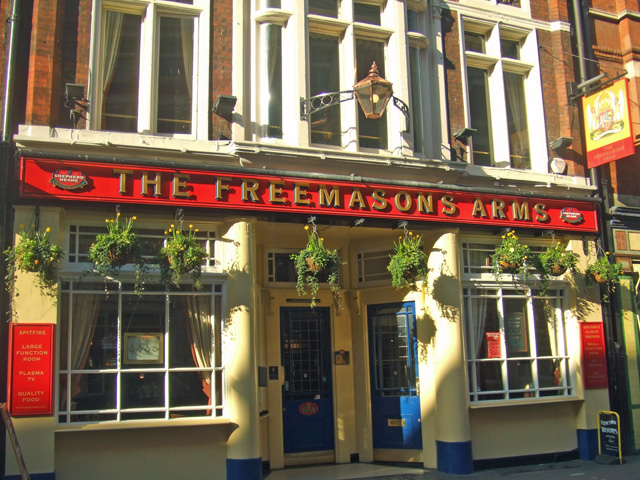
Freemasons Arms in Long Acre

The Covent Garden area has over 60 pubs and bars; several of them are listed buildings, with some also on CAMRA's National Inventory of Historic Pub Interiors; some, such as The Harp in Chandos Place, have received consumer awards. The Harp's awards include London Pub of the Year in 2008 by the Society for the Preservation of Beers from the Wood, and National Pub of the Year by CAMRA in 2010. It was at one time owned by the Charrington Brewery, when it was known as The Welsh Harp; in 1995 the name was abbreviated to just The Harp, before Charrington sold it to Punch Taverns in 1997. It was eventually purchased by the landlady Binnie Walsh around 2010 then subsequently sold by her to Fuller's Brewery in 2014. It continues to win regular CAMRA pub awards under its new owners.

The Lamb and Flag in Rose Street is possibly the oldest pub in the area. The first mention of a pub on the site is 1772 (when it was called the Cooper's Arms – the name changing to Lamb & Flag in 1833); the 1958 brick exterior conceals what may be an early 18th-century frame of a house replacing the original one built in 1638. The pub acquired a reputation for staging bare-knuckle prize fights during the early 19th century when it earned the nickname "Bucket of Blood". The alleyway beside the pub was the scene of an attack on John Dryden in 1679 by thugs hired by John Wilmot, 2nd Earl of Rochester, with whom he had a long-standing conflict.

The Salisbury in St Martin's Lane was built as part of a six-storey block around 1899 on the site of an earlier pub that had been known under several names, including the Coach & Horses and Ben Caunt's Head; it is both Grade II listed, and on CAMRA's National Inventory, due to the quality of the etched and polished glass and the carved woodwork, summed up as "good fin de siècle ensemble". The Freemasons Arms on Long Acre is linked with the founding of the Football Association in 1863; however, the meetings took place at The Freemason's Tavern on Great Queen Street, which was replaced in 1909 by the Connaught Rooms.

Other Grade II listed pubs include three 19th-century rebuilds of 17th-century and 18th-century houses, the Nell Gwynne Tavern in Bull Inn Court, the Nag's Head on James Street, and the White Swan on New Row; a Victorian pub built by lessees of the Marquis of Exeter, the Old Bell on the corner of Exeter Street and Wellington Street; and a late 18th or early 19th century pub the Angel and Crown on St Martin's Lane.

=== Restaurants ===
There is a wide range of restaurants, mainly in Covent Garden's central area around the piazza, and in the St Martin's Lane area bordering the West End; some of these with international reputations. Among the restaurants are the historic theatrical eating places, the oldest of which is Rules, which was founded in 1798, making it the oldest restaurant in London, followed by J. Sheekey, an oyster bar and fish restaurant founded in 1893 by market-stall holder Josef Sheekey in Lord Salisbury's St Martin's Court, and The Ivy, which was founded as an unlicensed Italian cafe by Abel Giandellini in 1917. Other restaurants include Gaby's Deli, a Jewish cafe and restaurant serving falafels and salt beef sandwiches since 1965, and Mon Plaisir, founded in 1943, one of the oldest French restaurants in London. Covent Garden was home to some of London's earliest coffee shops, such as Old Slaughter's Coffee House, which ran from 1692 until 1843, and a Beefsteak Club, the Sublime Society of Beef Steaks, which was co-founded in 1736 by William Hogarth at the Theatre Royal (now the Royal Opera House).

=== Cultural connections ===
Covent Garden, and especially the market, have appeared in a number of works. It is the place where Job Trotter, character of the Pickwick Papers by Dickens, spends the nights. In 1867, Johann Strauss II from Austria composed "Erinnerung an Covent Garden" (Memory of Covent Garden, op. 329). Eliza Doolittle, the central character in George Bernard Shaw's play, Pygmalion, and the musical adaptation by Alan Jay Lerner, My Fair Lady, is a Covent Garden flower seller. Alfred Hitchcock's 1972 film Frenzy about a Covent Garden fruit vendor who becomes a serial sex killer, was set in the market where his father had been a wholesale greengrocer. The daily activity of the market was the topic of a 1957 Free Cinema documentary by Lindsay Anderson, Every Day Except Christmas, which won the Grand Prix at the Venice Festival of Shorts and Documentaries.

=== Cinemas ===
The Garden Cinema, which opened in March 2022, is located in Parker Street. The cinema is designed in Art Deco style, inside and out. It was founded by retired legal publisher Michael Chambers, of Orbach and Chambers, who bought the office building in 2010 and, after selling his business in 2018, had it converted by architects Burrell Foley Fischer. It was ready by 2020, but the COVID-19 pandemic delayed its opening. The cinema partners with a number of film festivals and other organisations, as well as hosting Q&As, live music, and poetry recitals.

== Transport ==
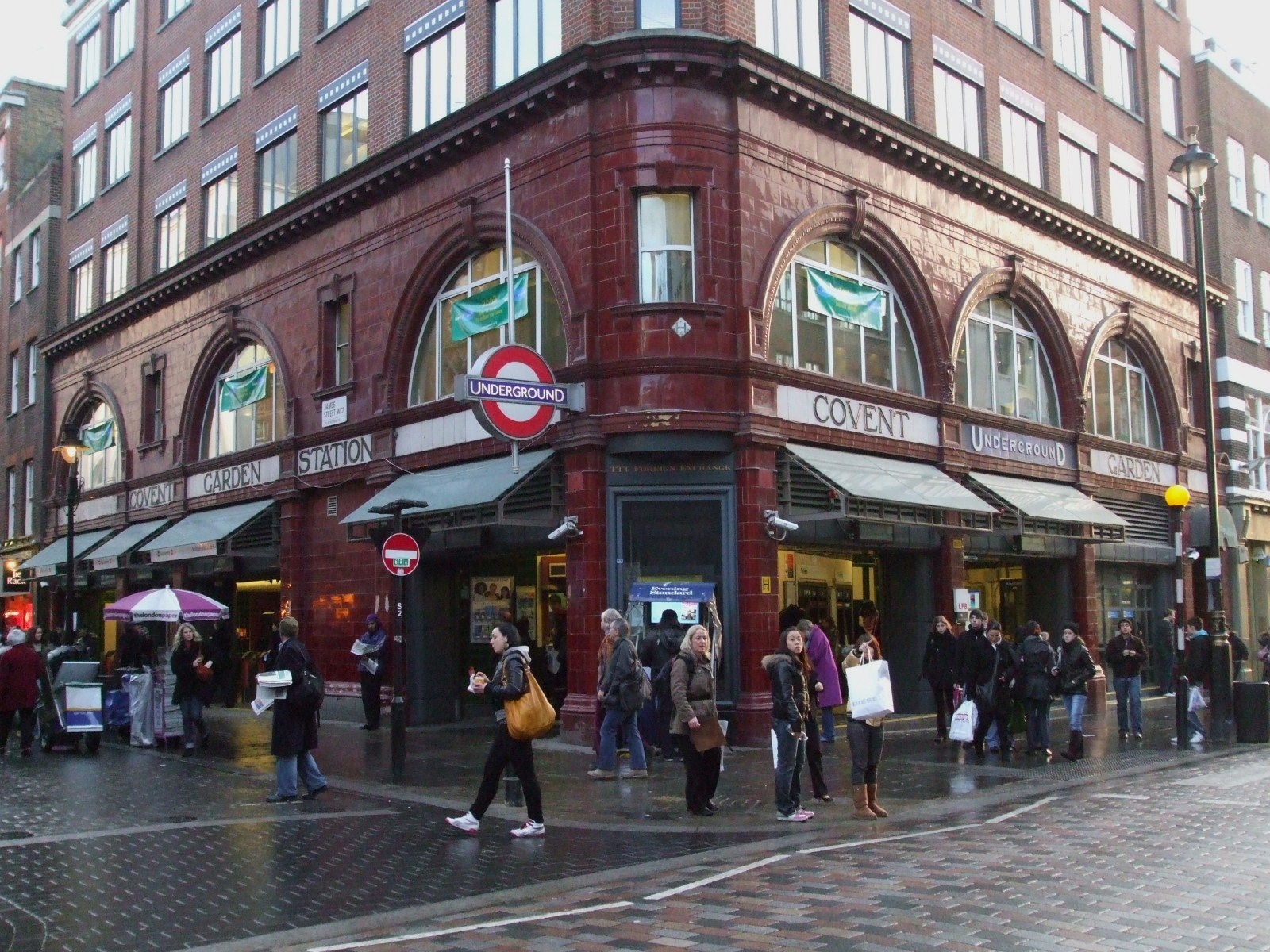
The 1907 London Underground tube station

Covent Garden tube station is situated on the corner of Long Acre and James Street. It is served by Piccadilly line trains, which link the area directly to important Central London destinations including King's Cross St Pancras, South Kensington, and Heathrow Airport. The station opened in 1907, and is one of the few in Central London for which platform access is only by lift or stairs.

The journey from Covent Garden to Leicester Square is London's shortest tube journey, at less than 300 yards. Leicester Square tube station is on the Piccadilly and Northern lines. The Northern line links Covent Garden directly to destinations such as Waterloo, Euston, and Camden Town.

Other nearby tube stations include Charing Cross, Embankment, and Holborn. Charing Cross is the nearest National Rail ('mainline') station to Covent Garden.

More than 30 London Buses routes run along Covent Garden's perimeters, although no routes run directly through Covent Garden following the permanent withdrawal of the RV1 route in 2019.

The Quietway 1 cycle route passes through Covent Garden. The route is signposted and runs on quieter roads or contraflow cycle lanes. The route runs northbound towards the Bloomsbury, and southbound to the Strand and Waterloo Bridge, via Bow Street.

The Santander Cycles bike sharing scheme operates in Covent Garden, with several docking points throughout the area.

== See also ==
- Little Australia
