= History of the Metropolitan Police =

History of law enforcement agency

The history of the Metropolitan Police in London is long and complex, with many different events taking place between its inception in 1829 and the present day.

== Pre-1829 London policing ==
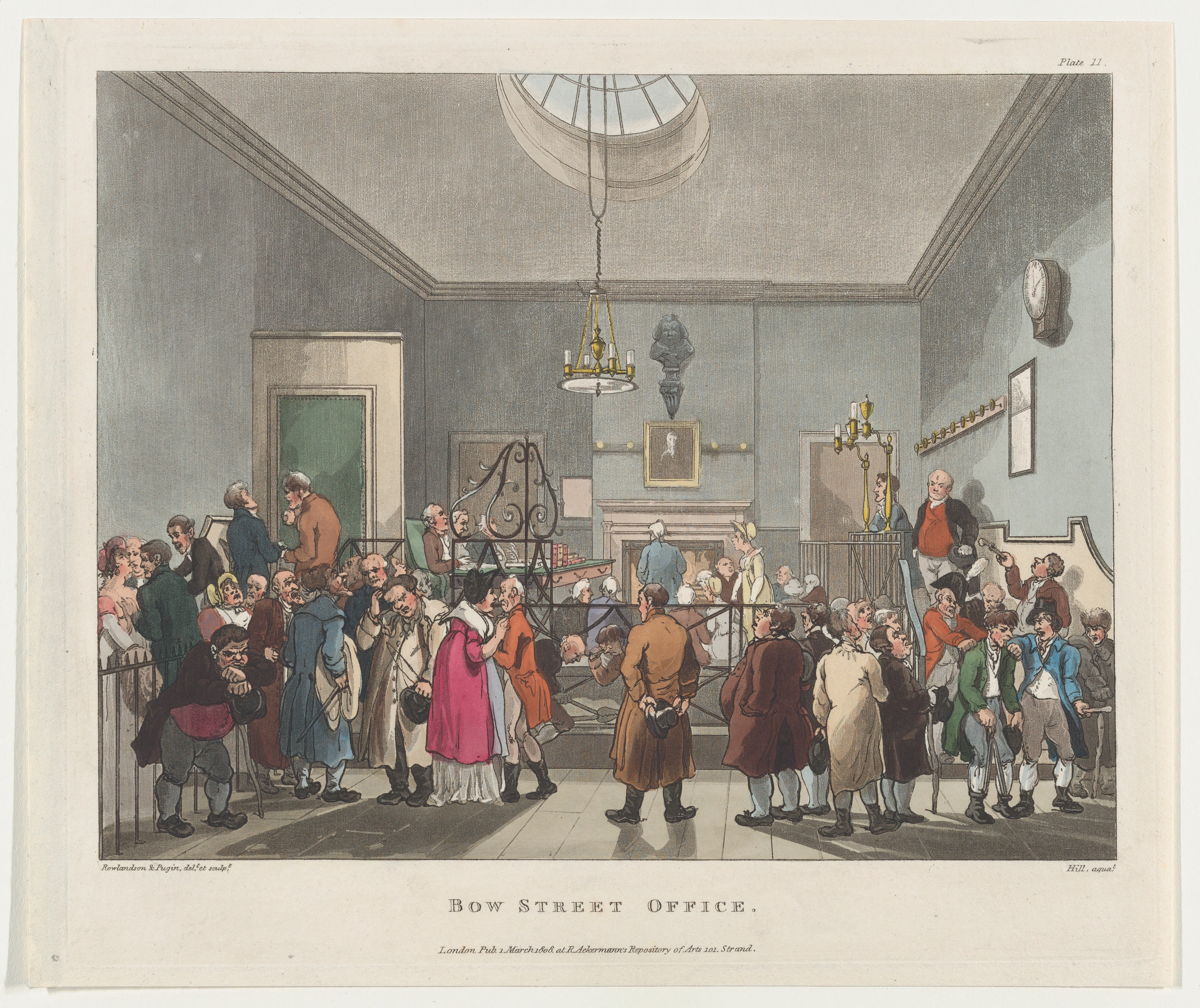
Caricature of Bow Street Magistrates' Court by Thomas Rowlandson, 1808

Before the passing of the Metropolitan Police Act 1829, law enforcement among the general population in England was carried out by unpaid parish constables who were elected, and later appointed by the local justice of the peace. In certain circumstances, such as serious public disorder, the army would intervene to support the local authorities; yeomanry were extensively used for this purpose before police forces developed. Because this system of policing was largely unorganised and lacked a criminal investigation capability, the novelist Henry Fielding (who had been appointed a Magistrate in 1748) introduced the first detective force, known as the Bow Street Runners, in 1753. Fielding's house at 4 Bow Street had been established as a courtroom by the previous owner, in 1739.

Fielding's force was made up of eight constables who also investigated crimes handed over to them by the volunteer constables and watchmen. Runners were identified by carrying a tipstaff with the Royal Crown on it, which had a compartment inside to store official identification and documents. In 1805 the Bow Street Horse Patrol, the first form of uniformed policing seen in the capital, was established alongside the Runners, later amalgamating into the Metropolitan Police in 1837. Unofficial "thief-takers" operated independently from the Bow Street Runners, being employed by fee-paying members of the public to catch criminals and present them before a magistrate.

By 1798, the year the Marine Police Force was established, salaried constables were being paid by local magistrates. The Marine Police was initially made up of 220 Constables assisted by 1,000 registered dock workers, and was responsible for preventing the theft of cargo on and around the River Thames. The London Marine Police Force is widely regarded as being the first modern police force in the world, in the sense that they were not government controlled and were responsible for the prevention of crime. In its first year of operation 2,000 offenders were found guilty of theft from the docks. This success led to the enacting of the Marine Police Bill, which made it the first publicly funded preventive police force in the history of English policing.

== The new police ==
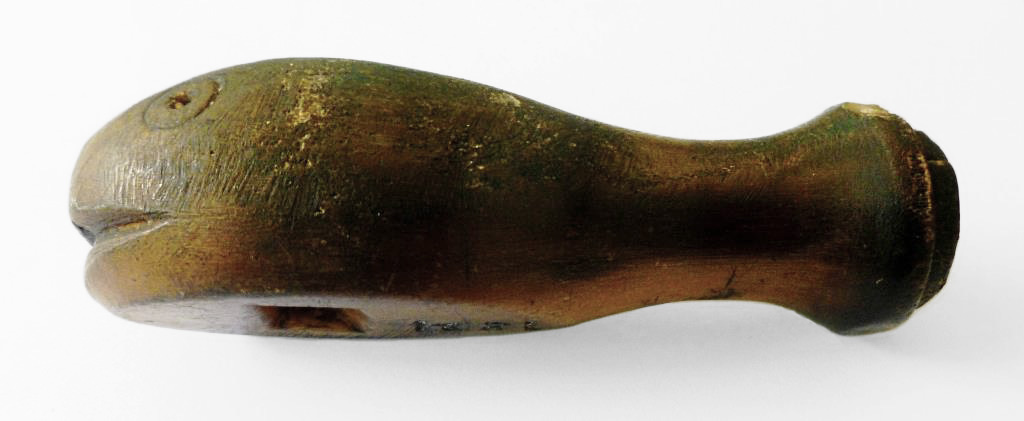
Carved whale bone whistle dated 1821 and reportedly later used by a Metropolitan Police "Peeler". 8 cm long

During the late-18th and early-19th centuries, the Industrial Revolution witnessed an exponential expansion in London's size and economic importance. It became clear that the locally maintained system of volunteer constables and "watchmen" lacked organisation and efficiency in the deterrence, detection and prevention of crime. As a result, a parliamentary committee was appointed to investigate the current system of policing. Upon Sir Robert Peel being appointed as Home Secretary in 1822, he established a second and more effective committee, and acted upon its findings. As Chief Secretary for Ireland in the British Cabinet from 1812 to 1818, Sir Robert had previously reformed policing in Ireland. Believing in standardising policing by making it an official paid profession, by organising it in a civilian fashion, and by making it answerable to the public, Peel put a bill before Parliament, which passed as the Metropolitan Police Act 1829, given royal assent on 19 June 1829. The Act placed policing arrangements for the capital directly under the control of Sir Robert Peel.

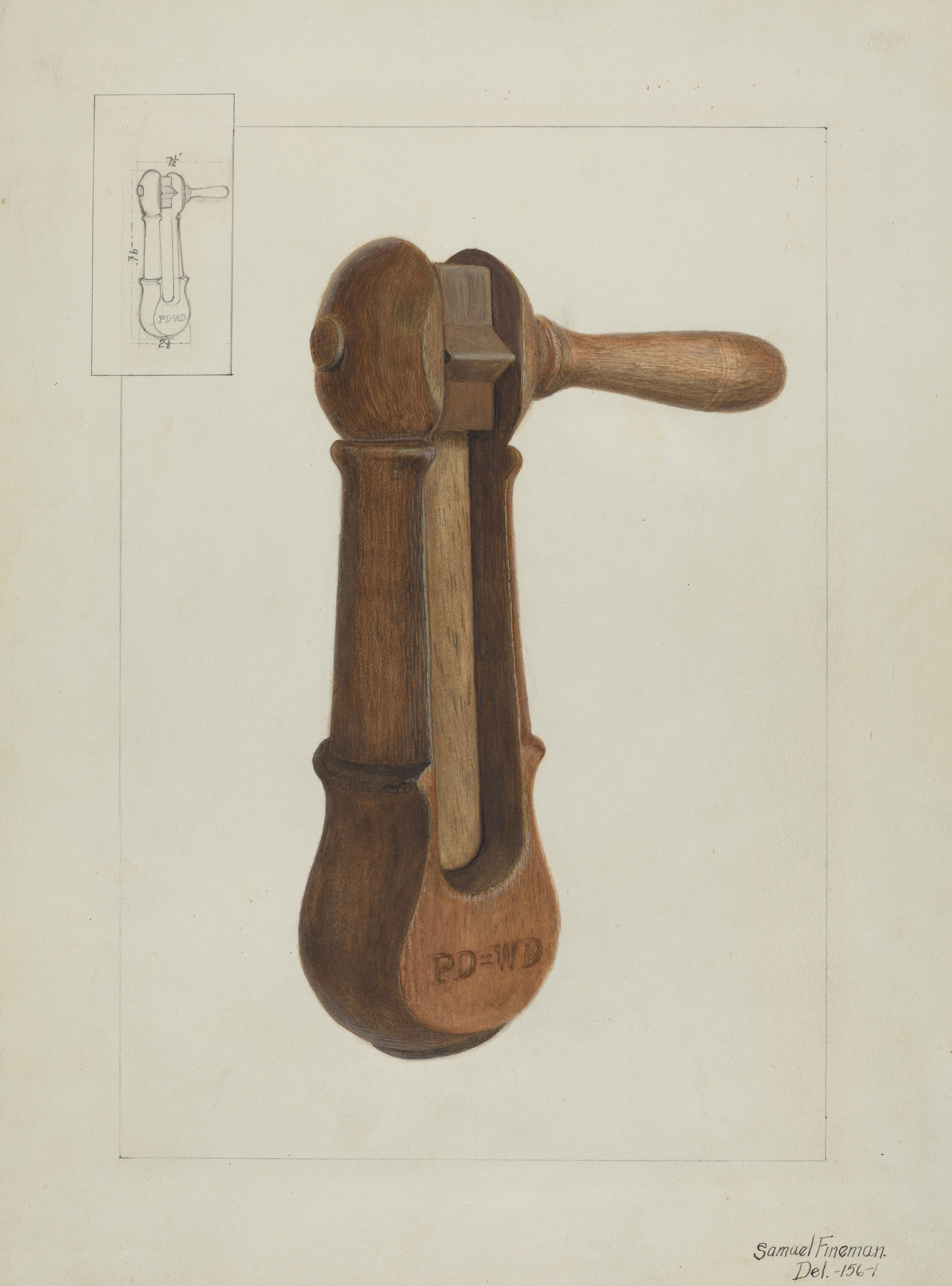
A 1930s American police rattle of the type used by the early Metropolitan Police

Lieutenant-Colonel Sir Charles Rowan and Sir Richard Mayne were appointed the new force's first Commissioners, and "Commissioner" has remained the Metropolitan Police's highest rank, unlike in other modern British police forces, which come under Chief Constables. The two Commissioners' original headquarters was near Government, at 4 Whitehall Place, with a back entrance on Great Scotland Yard. "Scotland Yard" soon became established as a name for the force itself. Once formed, the force became the third official non-paramilitary city police-force in the world, after the City of Glasgow Police and the Paris Police. Owing to public fears concerning the deployment of the military in domestic matters, Robert Peel organised the force along civilian lines, rather than paramilitary ones. To appear neutral, the uniform was deliberately manufactured in blue, rather than red, which was then a military colour, alongside the officers being armed with only a wooden truncheon and a rattle to signal the need for assistance. Until 1864, police officers also wore top hats to complete the civilian look. Alongside this, police ranks did not include military titles, with the exception of "Sergeant". The original standard wage for a Constable was one guinea (£1.05) a week. Recruitment criteria required applicants to be under the age of 35, in good health, and to be at least 5 ft 7 in (1.70 m) tall. Working shifts lasted 12 hours, 6 days a week, with Sunday as a rest day. Until 1897, Metropolitan Police officers did not receive a boot allowance.

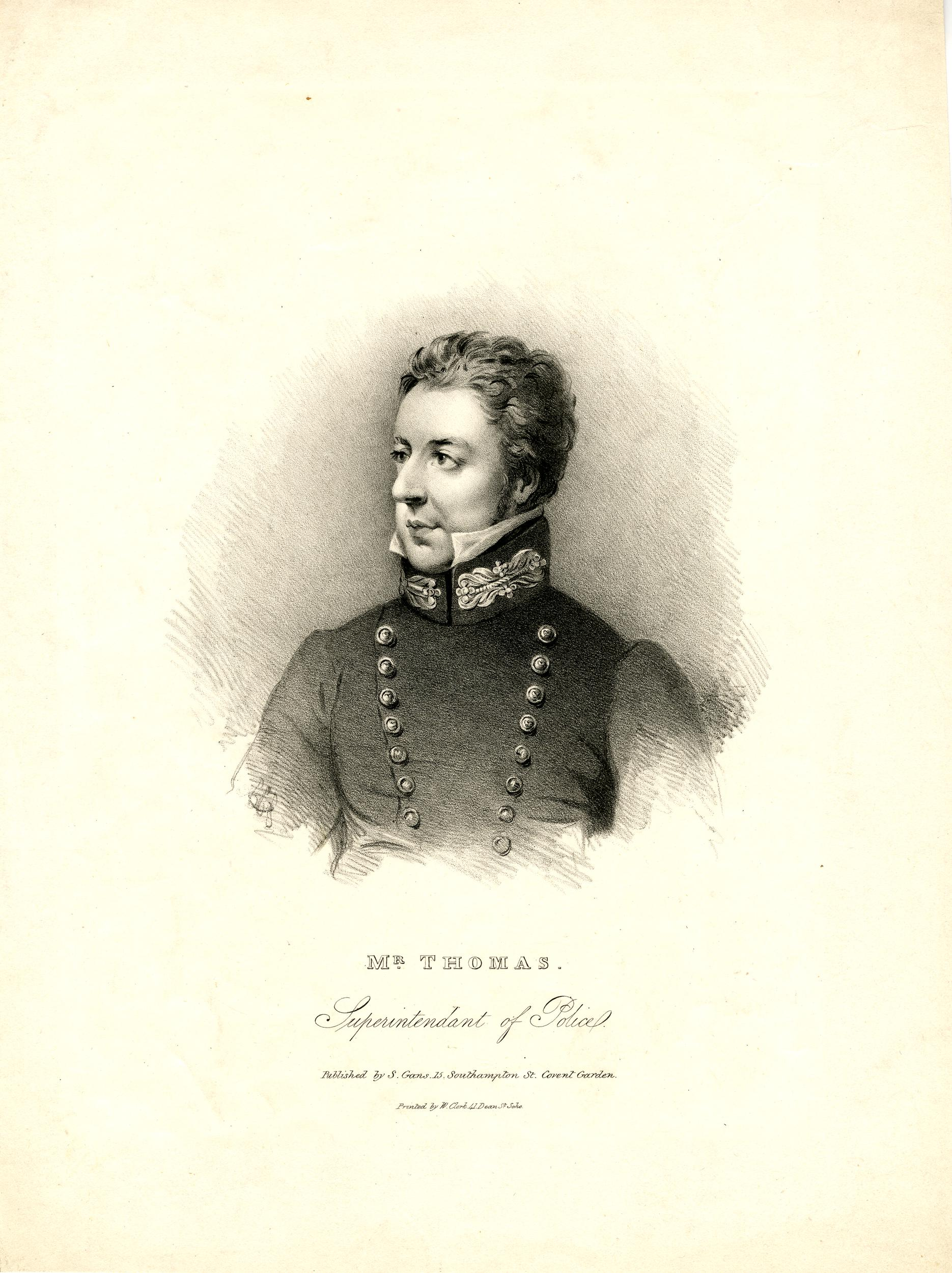
Joseph Sadler Thomas in uniform as first Superintendent of the Metropolitan Police's F (Covent Garden) Division between 1829 and 1833. Previously a parish constable for St Paul's, Covent Garden, he later became Deputy Constable of Manchester City Police (1833–1839).

The civilian ethos also meant that the force did not routinely carry firearms, although Sir Robert Peel authorised the Commissioners to purchase fifty flintlock pocket-pistols for use in exceptional circumstances, such as those that involved the use of firearms. At the time, burglary (or "house breaking" as it was then called) was a common problem for police, and "house breakers" usually carried arms. It was then also legal (under the Bill of Rights 1689) for the Protestant-majority members of the public to own and use firearms.

== 19th century ==
=== 1829–1838 ===
Metropolitan Police patrols took to the streets on 29 September 1829, despite resistance from certain elements of the community who saw them to be a threat to civil liberties. The initial force consisted of two Commissioners, eight Superintendents, 20 Inspectors, 88 Sergeants and 895 Constables. Patrolling the streets within a seven-mile (11 km) radius of Charing Cross, in order to prevent crime and pursue offenders.

Between 1829 and 1830, 17 local divisions each with a central police station were established, with each division assigned a letter. These divisions were:

- A (Whitehall)
- B (Westminster (Note: Later known as Chelsea.))
- C (St James's)
- D (Marylebone)
- E (Holborn)
- F (Covent Garden)
- G (Finsbury)
- H (Whitechapel)
- K (Stepney (Note: Later known as Bow.))
- L (Lambeth)
- M (Southwark)
- N (Islington)
- P (Camberwell)
- R (Greenwich)
- S (Hampstead)
- T (Kensington (Note: Later known as Hammersmith.))
- V (Wandsworth)

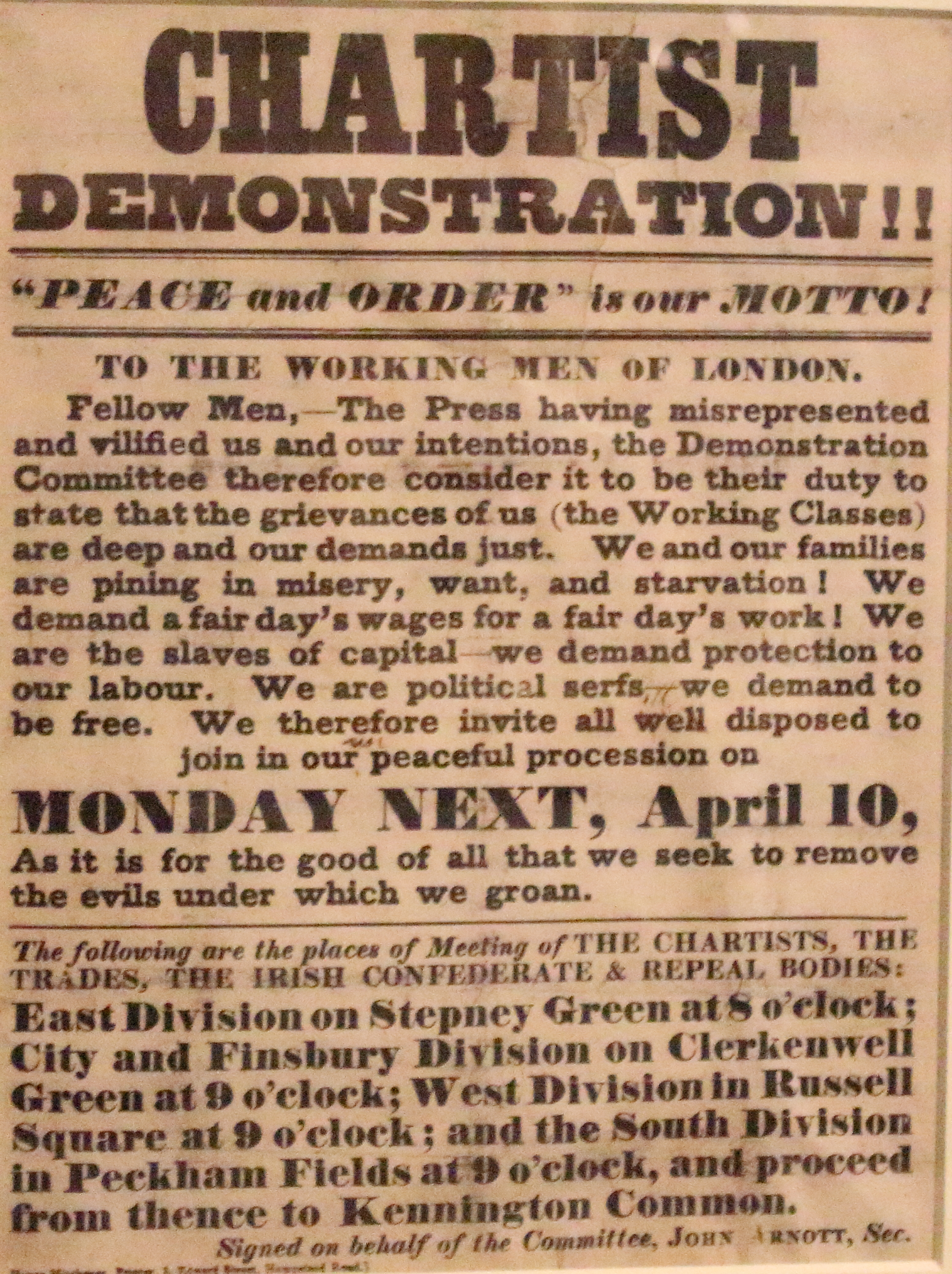
Flyer for the Chartist demonstration on Kennington Common, 1848

On 28 June 1830, Constable Joseph Grantham became the first member of the force to die (from a stroke) while on duty. The Coroner's Inquest as described the assault on the officer as "justifiable homicide". Other indications of the Constabulary's unpopularity of the time were such nicknames as 'Raw Lobsters', 'Blue Devils' and 'Peel's Bloody Gang'. Officers were physically assaulted, blinded, and on one occasion held down while a vehicle was driven over them.

=== 1839–1859 ===
In 1840, as a result of the second Metropolitan Police Act the previous year, the MPD was expanded to a 15-mile radius from Charing Cross, the Foot Patrol, the Horse Patrol and the River Police were amalgamated with the Metropolitan Police (the last of the three as Thames Division), and the Bow Street Runners were disbanded (with its personnel moved to the Metropolitan Police). Peel had hoped the Met might also incorporate the City of London but another 1839 Act confirmed an independent City of London Police (CoLP), which survives until this day. The River Police was renamed Thames Division, expanding from its origins in London's commercial docks to cover the whole section of the River Thames within the MPD – this included the stretch along the south bank of the City of London (since CoLP did not maintain its own river police) and originally stretched from Brentford to Blackwall before later being extended eastwards to the Thames-Darent confluence.

The Metropolitan Police was formed without detectives since that role had previously been undertaken by the Runners, but in 1842 it formed a new investigative force named the "Detective Branch". It initially consisted of two Inspectors, six Sergeants and a number of Constables. One of its first cases was the Bermondsey Horror of 1849, in which a married couple murdered Patrick O'Connor and buried his body under the kitchen floor. After going on the run, they were tracked down by Detective Sergeants Thornton and Langley and publicly hanged outside Horsemonger Gaol in Southwark.

One of the Metropolitan Police's priorities from the outset was maintaining public order, particularly the Chartist demonstrations in 1839, 1842 and 1848. Sixty Met officers were also dispatched to Birmingham in July of that year where they were involved in the suppression of Chartist meetings leading to the Bull Ring Riots. The Met was also supplemented for public order purposes by Special Constables, first introduced by the Special Constables Act 1831, empowering Magistrates to appoint ordinary citizens as temporary police officers in times of emergency. In 1834, the Act had been extended to allow citizens appointed as Specials to act outside of their Parish area. They proved particularly valuable against the final Chartist demonstrations in 1848, when 150,000 Specials were sworn in to assist regular officers in preventing Chartists from reaching Kennington and then marching to Westminster.

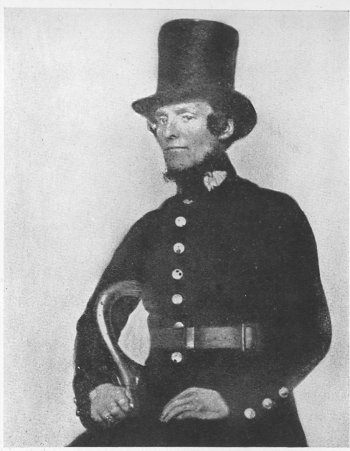
An 1850s Metropolitan Police "Peeler"

When Sir Charles Rowan died, another army officer, William Hay, was drafted in to jointly run the force with Mayne. However, tensions between them meant that on Hay's death in 1855 a new system of a single Commissioner and two Assistant Commissioners was established. In 1857 Matne was paid a salary of £1,883 (roughly equivalent to £191,100 in 2021), and his two Assistant Commissioners were paid salaries £800 each, approximately £81,190 in 2021.

=== 1860–1899 ===
In 1860, the Metropolitan Police also took on responsibility for the policing of the Royal Dockyards and other royal naval bases between 1860 until 1934, including Portsmouth, Chatham, Devonport, Royal Naval Air Station Pembroke, and the Royal Woolwich Arsenal. It took some time to establish the standards of discipline expected today from a police force. In 1863, 215 officers were arrested for being intoxicated while on duty, In 1872 there was a police strike, and during 1877 three high ranking detectives were tried for corruption. Owing to this latter scandal, the Detective Branch was re-organised in 1878 by C. E. Howard Vincent, and renamed the Criminal Investigation Department (CID). This was separated from the uniformed branch, and its head had direct access to the Home Secretary, by-passing the Commissioner.

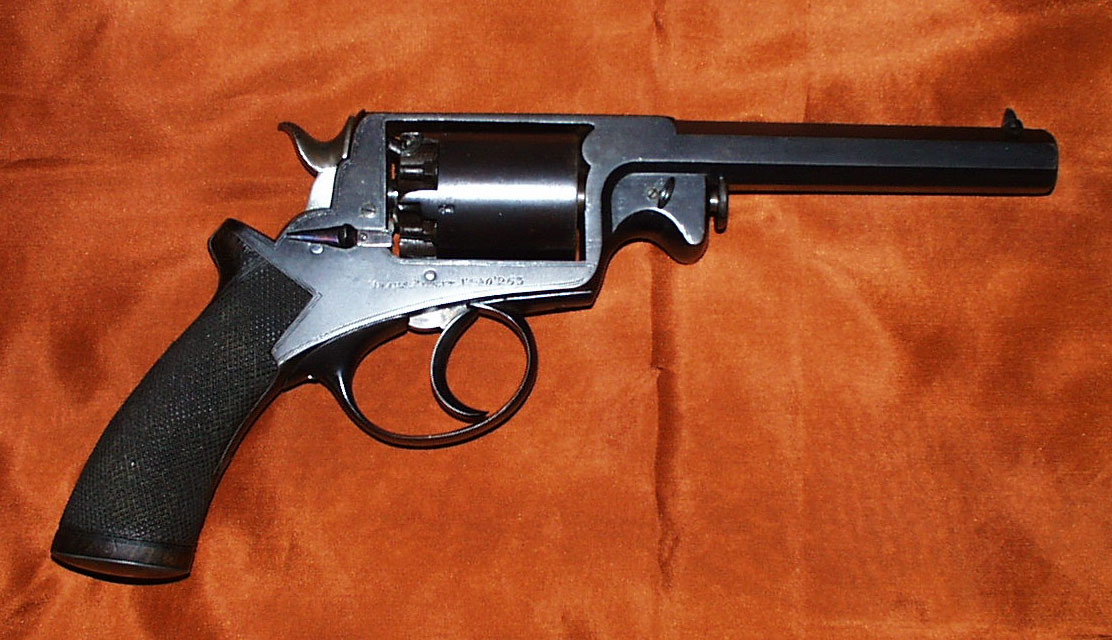
Beaument Adams Revolver

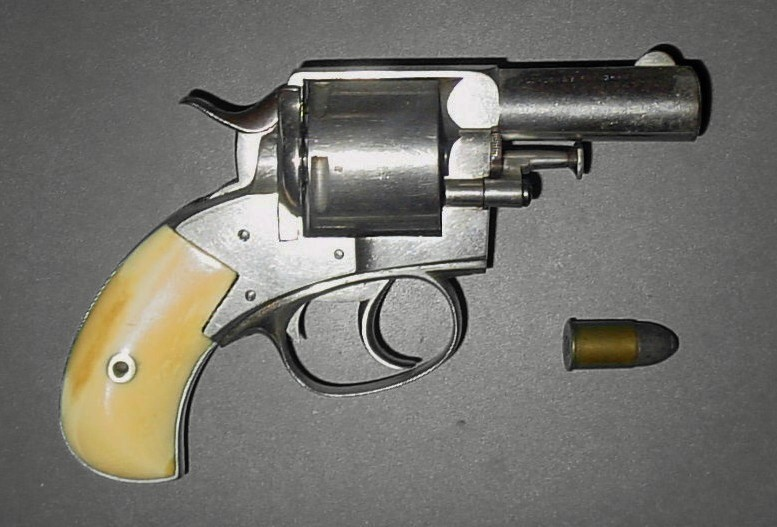
Webley "Bulldog" Revolver

Following the deaths of officers by firearms on the outer districts of the metropolis, and public debate on arming the force, the Commissioner applied to the Home Secretary for authorisation to supply officers on the outer districts with revolvers. The authorisation was issued on the condition that revolvers would be issued only if, in the opinion of the senior officer, the officer could be trusted to use it safely and with discretion. From then, officers could be armed. The vast majority of this system had been phased out by the end of the 19th century, though the practice wholly ceased in only 1936 with the revocation of authorisation to carry revolvers on outer districts. The 1860s also saw the decommissioning of the flintlock pistols purchased in 1829. They were superseded by 622 Beaumont–Adams revolvers firing the .450 cartridge, which were loaned to the police by the Army after the Clerkenwell bombing. In 1883, officers were surveyed as to whether they wished to be armed. 4,430 out of 6,325 officers serving on outer divisions requested to the issue revolvers. The now obsolete Beaumont-Adams revolver was returned to stores for emergencies, and the Bulldog 'Metropolitan Police' revolver was issued to officers on the outer districts who felt the need to be armed.

In 1865 three more divisions were created: W (Clapham), X (Willesden), and Y (Highgate (Note: Later Tottenham.)). F Division was abolished by the late 1860s and its territory merged into E Division. From 1869 onwards the Met's Divisions were grouped as Districts, each initially headed by a District Superintendent: (Note: Later by a Chief Constable (1886–1933), then a Deputy Assistant Commissioner (1933–1946), and finally a Deputy Commander (1946–1968) until their abolition in 1968.)

- No. 1 District – G, H, K, N, and Thames Divisions (Note: From 1886 also J Division.) (Note: A, B, C, F, T, and V Divisions by 1933.)
- No. 2 District – D, E, S, X, and Y Divisions (Note: From 1965 also Q Division.)
- No. 3 District – A, B, C, T, and V Divisions (Note: From 1886 also F Division.) (Note: G, H, K, N, J, and Thames Divisions by 1933.)
- No. 4 District – L, M, P, R, and W Divisions (Note: From 1921 also Z Division.)

In March 1883, the MPS formed the Special Irish Branch to combat the threat of Irish terrorism. The "Irish" sobriquet was dropped in 1888 as the department remit was extended to cover other threats, and became known simply as Special Branch. In 1884, the MPS replaced the hand rattles used by officers to signal for assistance since 1829 with "police whistles". J.Hudson & Company of Birmingham supplied 7,175 whistles at the price of 11d each.

At the same time, the Metropolitan Police also replaced its police truncheons. In 1886, in quelling a riot between warring working parties in Hyde Park, many truncheons were damaged or broken. Ross & Company supplied them with lignum vitae truncheons. Samples were sent off to be tested by the Royal Army Clothing Department, at a cost of 16 shillings per day. The lignum vitae truncheons were found unsuitable and so in October 1886 the Metropolitan Police purchased £900 worth of lancewood and cocuswood for new truncheons. Important criminal investigations of the period included the Whitechapel murders (1888) and the Cleveland Street scandal (1889).

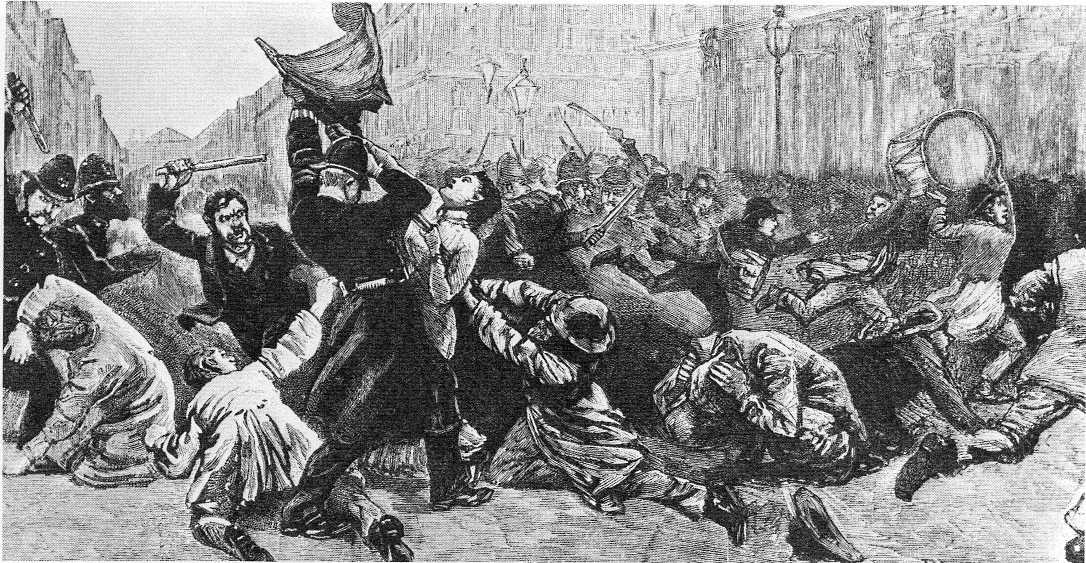
A contemporary engraving from The Illustrated London News of Bloody Sunday in 1887

1886 also saw the creation of a new J (Bethnal Green (Note: Later known as Hackney.)) and F (Paddington) Divisions. On the night of 18 February 1887, PC 52206 Henry Owen became the first Metropolitan Police officer to fire a revolver while on duty, doing so after he was unable to alert the owners of premises on fire. The Metropolitan Police also continued policing demonstrations such as that by the unemployed in Trafalgar Square in 1887, which came to be known as Bloody Sunday. Officers on duty during the jubilee celebrations the same year were eligible for the Queen Victoria Police Jubilee Medal, with similar police-specific medals following for the jubilee of 1897 and the coronations in 1902 and 1911.

== 20th century ==
=== 1900–1918 ===
By 1900, the service had grown to nearly 16,000 officers, organised into 21 divisions, responsible for law enforcement within an area of nearly 1,800 km^{2}. Detection of crimes was much improved when Sir Edward Henry, Commissioner from 1903 to 1918, set up a Fingerprint Bureau at Scotland Yard in 1901, building on Azizul Haque and Hem Chandra Bose's work with him in India. A landmark case for the Met in forensic investigation was the Stratton Brothers case of 1905, concerning a double murder in Deptford, committed by Alfred and Albert Stratton, the first murder conviction in the UK secured by fingerprint evidence. Another important investigation of this period was that into the murderer Hawley Harvey Crippen in 1910.

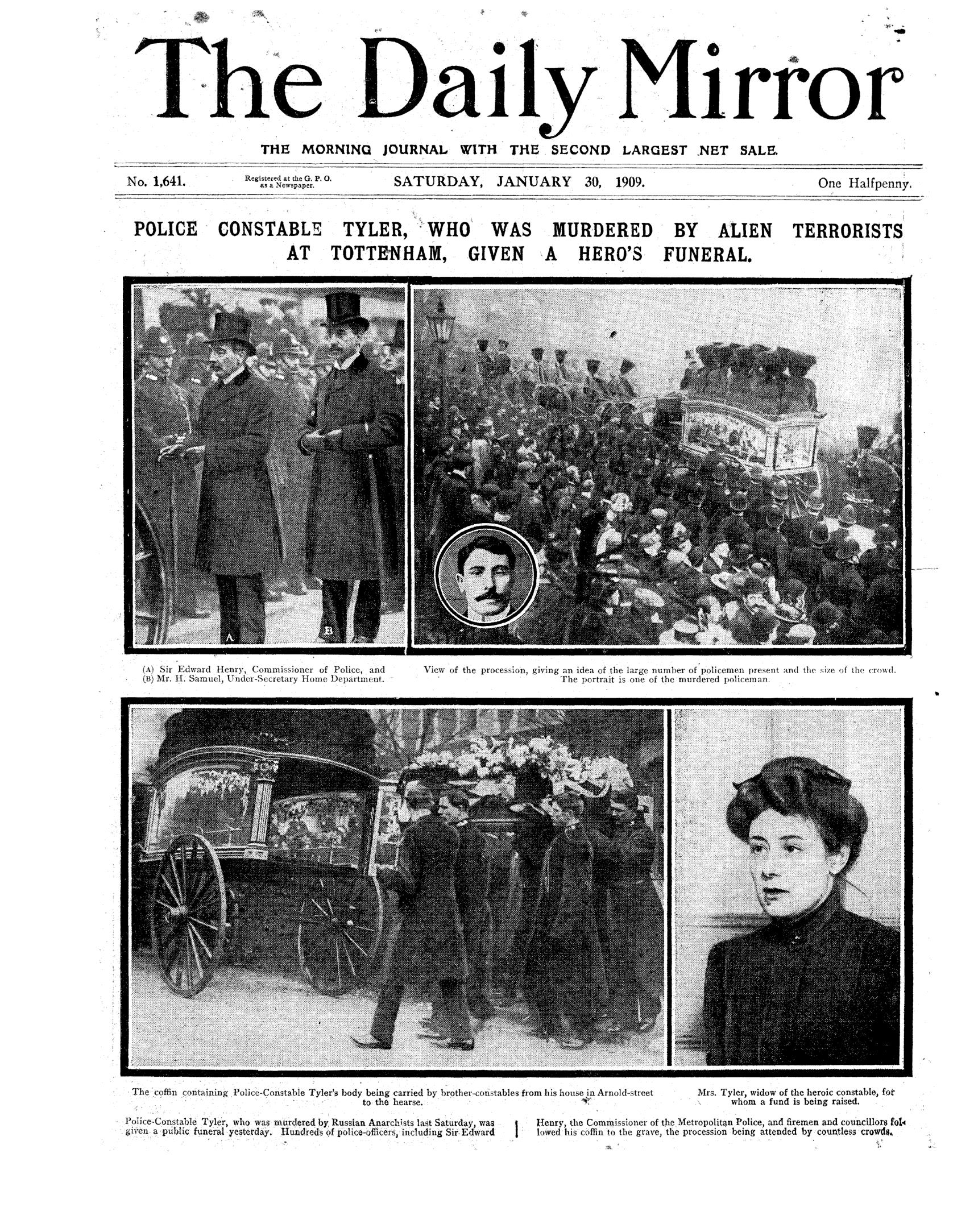
The Daily Mirror front page reporting the funeral of PC William Tyler, the Metropolitan Police officer killed during the Tottenham Outrage, 1909

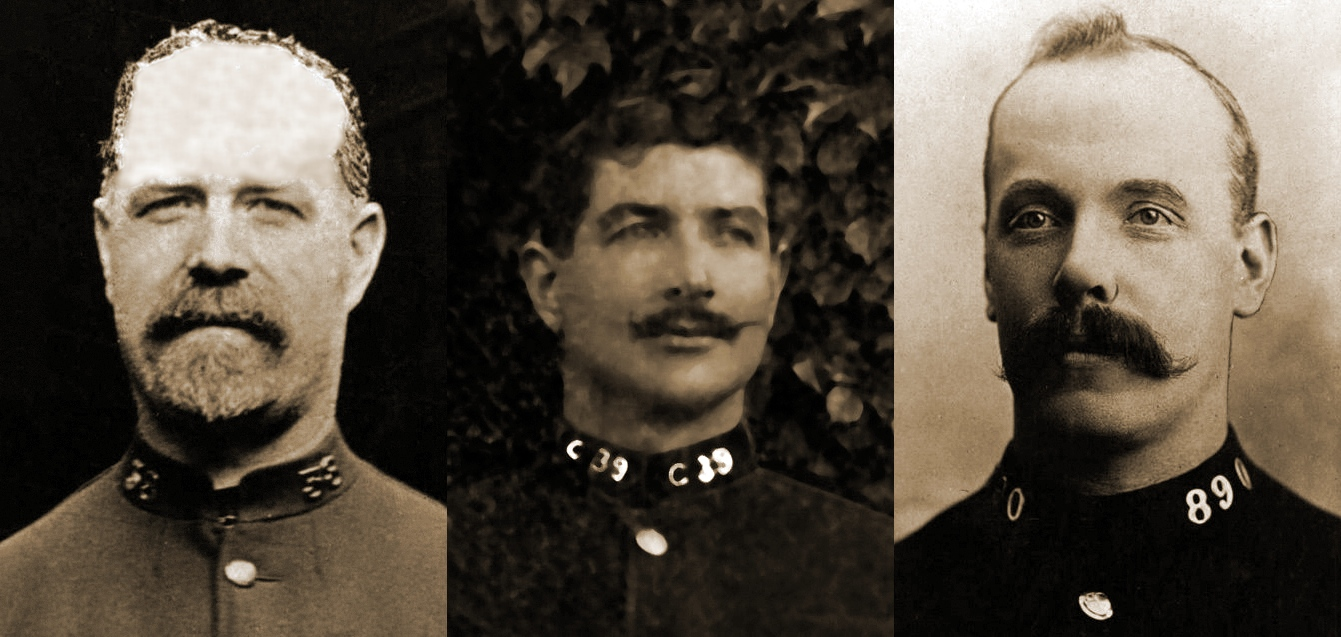
Sergeants Tucker and Bentley and Constable Choate, murdered while on duty on 16 December 1910

Two robberies by Latvian anarchists reopened the debate over arming the Metropolitan and City police forces. The first in 1909 led to the pursuit known as the Tottenham Outrage, in which officers borrowed bystanders' guns and one officer was fatally shot by the robbers. The second in Houndsditch on 16 December 1910 led to the murder of three City of London Police constables and the Siege of Sidney Street by the Metropolitan and City police forces. In this siege the two forces were supplemented by a detachment of Scots Guards from the Tower of London, authorised by Home Secretary Winston Churchill who had come to see the siege in person. The gang members were killed on 2 January 1911 and in the wake of the incident one thousand self-loading Webley & Scott pistols were purchased by the Metropolitan Police. In 1914 the Bulldogs were withdrawn from service after thirty-one years' service and returned to stores. The Specials were also reorganised in 1912, scrapping the old system of anyone being liable to be appointed, instead they had to volunteer.

During World War One the Women's Police Service (WPS) and National Union of Women Workers (NUWW) ran voluntary patrols to assist county and city police forces such as the Metropolitan Police, though they were not formally parts of these forces and had no power of arrest. Policing of Rosyth Dockyard was added to the Metropolitan Police's remit in 1916, a role they held until 1926. Concerns over worsening pay and conditions led almost all Met officers to join a strike in 1918 and 1156 officers to join another in August the following year.

=== 1919–1929 ===
Female full police officers first joined the Metropolitan Police in February 1919, although the then Commissioner, Sir Nevil Macready, insisted he did not want any “vinegary spinsters” or “blighted middle-aged fanatics” in its ranks. The female police officers were distinguished from their male counterparts, who had wider authority, by the prefix 'woman' before their rank, such as "Woman Police Constable" and "Woman Police Sergeant". They were headed by Sofia Stanley, who also designed the first women's police uniform, known as the Stanley uniform. Initial duties of female police officers included patrolling areas frequented by prostitutes, alongside care and observation of female and juvenile detainees, deterring prostitution, helping prevent the deceitful practice of fortune telling, and looking after women attempting to commit suicide. Female officers were allowed to go into brothels, nightclubs, and betting houses to observe and gather evidence of untoward behaviour, but at the first sign of crime being committed, they had to call in male colleagues. They were also not allowed to carry handcuffs unless instructed to by a senior officer.

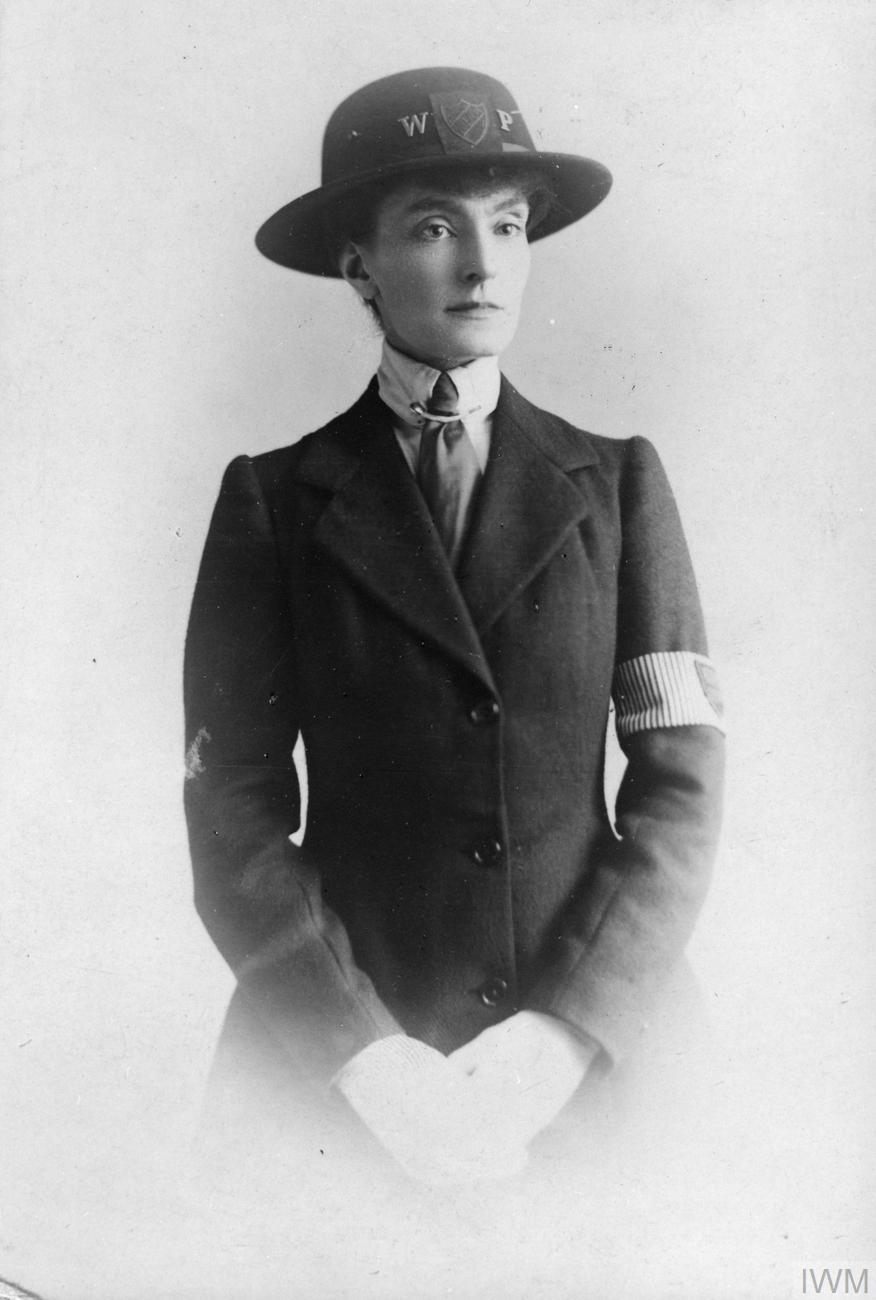
Sofia Stanley in NUWW patrol officer uniform – from 1919 to 1923, she led the Met's first official female patrols

1921 saw the addition of a new Z (Croydon) Division, carved out of parts of W Division, but the following year the post-war budget cutbacks known as the Geddes Axe led the Met to begin phasing out its dockyard divisions in 1923 (a process finally completed in 1934) and attempt to abolish its female officers after only four years. Though it lost her her job, Sofia Stanley successfully fought this attempt and instead a cadre of twenty female officers was allowed to continue as a seed-bed for future growth. In the wake of the Sex Disqualification (Removal) Act 1919 they were granted the power of arrest for the first time and posted to various areas of the Met, with Louise Pelling attached to Special Branch and Lilian Wyles joining the Criminal Investigation Department as a statement-taker for sexual-offence cases, the CID's first attested female officer. They worked early and late shifts, each of 7.5 hours, but until 1973 only one week of night shifts in contrast to three consecutive weeks of night shifts for men. A policy was introduced in 1927 requiring women to leave the Metropolitan Police if they got married.

=== 1930s ===
In 1931, Marshal of the Royal Air Force The 1st Baron Trenchard was appointed as Police Commissioner. Lord Trenchard served as head of the Metropolitan Police until 1935 and during his tenure he instigated several changes. These included limiting membership of the Police Federation, introducing limited terms of employment and the short-lived creation of separate career paths for the lower and higher ranks akin to the military system of officer and non-commissioned career streams. Perhaps Trenchard's most well known achievement during his time as Commissioner was the establishment of the Hendon Police College, which originally was the institution from which Trenchard's junior station inspectors graduated before following a career in the higher ranks.

Trenchard gave the special constables their current name of the Metropolitan Special Constabulary (MSC) in 1934. For a short period of time after the MSC was formed, Specials did not receive uniforms like that of a full-time policeman. Instead, they were issued with armbands, which identified them as Special Constables, alongside being issued a truncheon and a whistle. Trenchard also standardised the issue of pistols among divisions with the division size determining the number of firearms (with thirty-two rounds per pistol) issued: ten pistols with 320 rounds of ammunition were issued to each divisional station; six pistols with 192 rounds to each sub-divisional station; three pistols with 96 rounds to each section station. In 1936, just after his term as Commissioner, the authorisation to carry revolvers on outer districts was revoked, and at the same time Canadian Ross rifles were purchased in the prelude to the Second World War. In 1937 female Met officers were for the first time authorised to take fingerprints.

=== 1939–1945 ===
When the United Kingdom entered the Second World War on 3 September 1939, the strength of the Metropolitan Police stood at 18,428, which was 900 officers short of full strength. Owing to the increased responsibilities of the police during war-time, three reserve groups were mobilised. The first consisted of 2,737 ex-police pensioners who were re-engaged, a second of 5,380 Special Constables serving on a full-time basis for the duration of the war, and the third being 18,868 War Reserve Constables employed on the same basis as the Special Constables. After having remained stable for decades, crime rates in London soared during the war, posing a new challenge to police. The chaotic conditions of the City under aerial attack were followed by crime, such as looting, and theft of goods and foodstuffs for illicit sales as black market rationed goods. This also fuelled the activities of criminal gangs who continued and expanded their activities after the war.

16 Met detectives were transferred to the Army to form its new Special Investigation Branch. As the Battle of Dunkirk raged, Scotland Yard issued a memorandum detailing the police use of firearms in wartime. The memorandum detailed the planned training for all officers in the use of pistols and revolvers, as despite the police being a non-combatant force, while the war was in progress they would be responsible for providing armed protection at premises deemed at risk from enemy sabotage and would assist the British Armed Forces in the event of an invasion. Owing to these added roles, on 1 June 1940, 3,500 Canadian Ross Rifles and 72,384 rounds of .303 ammunition were received from the military and distributed among divisions. Thames Division were allocated the smallest number of 61 rifles, and "S" Division the largest with 190. Fifty rifles were also issued to the London Fire Brigade and the Port of London Authority Police.

=== 1945–1959 ===
The rise in criminality continued in the post-war period – by 1948 the number of recorded crimes in London had risen tenfold from the 1920s, to more than 126,000. By 1959 they had reached 160,000. Having been waived during the war, the marriage bar on female officers was permanently abolished in 1946 and two years later the Police Federation, the rank-and-file staff association, opened its membership to women.

One of the most prominent cases of the time was that of the shooting of Constable Sidney Miles by Derek Bentley on the night of 2 November 1952. Bentley was sentenced to death and hanged on 28 January 1953, whilst Craig was remanded at Her Majesty's Pleasure and released from prison in 1963. DS Fairfax, PC Norman Harrison and PC James McDonald were all awarded the George Cross for their roles in the incident, whilst Constable Robert Jaggs was awarded the British Empire Medal and Sidney Miles a posthumous Queen's Police Medal for Gallantry. Bentley was later given a posthumous pardon and quashing of his conviction in 1998.

In the aftermath of the shooting, 15 per cent of firearms in service with the Metropolitan Police were found to be defective, leading to Special Branch and Royalty Protection Officers being armed with an early version of the Beretta automatic pistol.

The 1950s also saw the Metropolitan Police's first women officers to receive George Medals for courage, Sergeant Ethel Bush and Kathleen Parrott, who had been separately attacked by a sex offender whilst on a decoy duty in 1955.

Since 1951, in common with all members of UK police forces, officers can receive the Police Long Service and Good Conduct Medal after 20 (formerly 22) years of duty.

=== 1960–1978 ===
Before the 1970s, police forces often called for assistance from the Metropolitan Police because of their detective experience. The last case of this kind was when the now defunct Buckinghamshire Constabulary called upon the MPS to help in the investigation of the Great Train Robbery. In 1965 the last of the Met's territorial divisions was formed and named Q (Wembley (Note: Also known as Brent, Harrow or Bushey.)) in 1965, formed out of part of X Division. In 1966 three male Metropolitan Police officers were murdered on Braybrook Street by Harry Roberts and two other occupants of a vehicle who had been stopped for questioning. The force enlisted Norwell Roberts (its first Windrush generation black officer) in 1967, followed by its first black female officer Sislin Fay Allen the following year. 1968 saw the abolition of the groupings of divisions known as Districts, ninety-nine years after their formation. The end of the 1960s also saw the Met's old alphabetical Divisions renamed Districts and Sub-Divisions renamed Divisions.

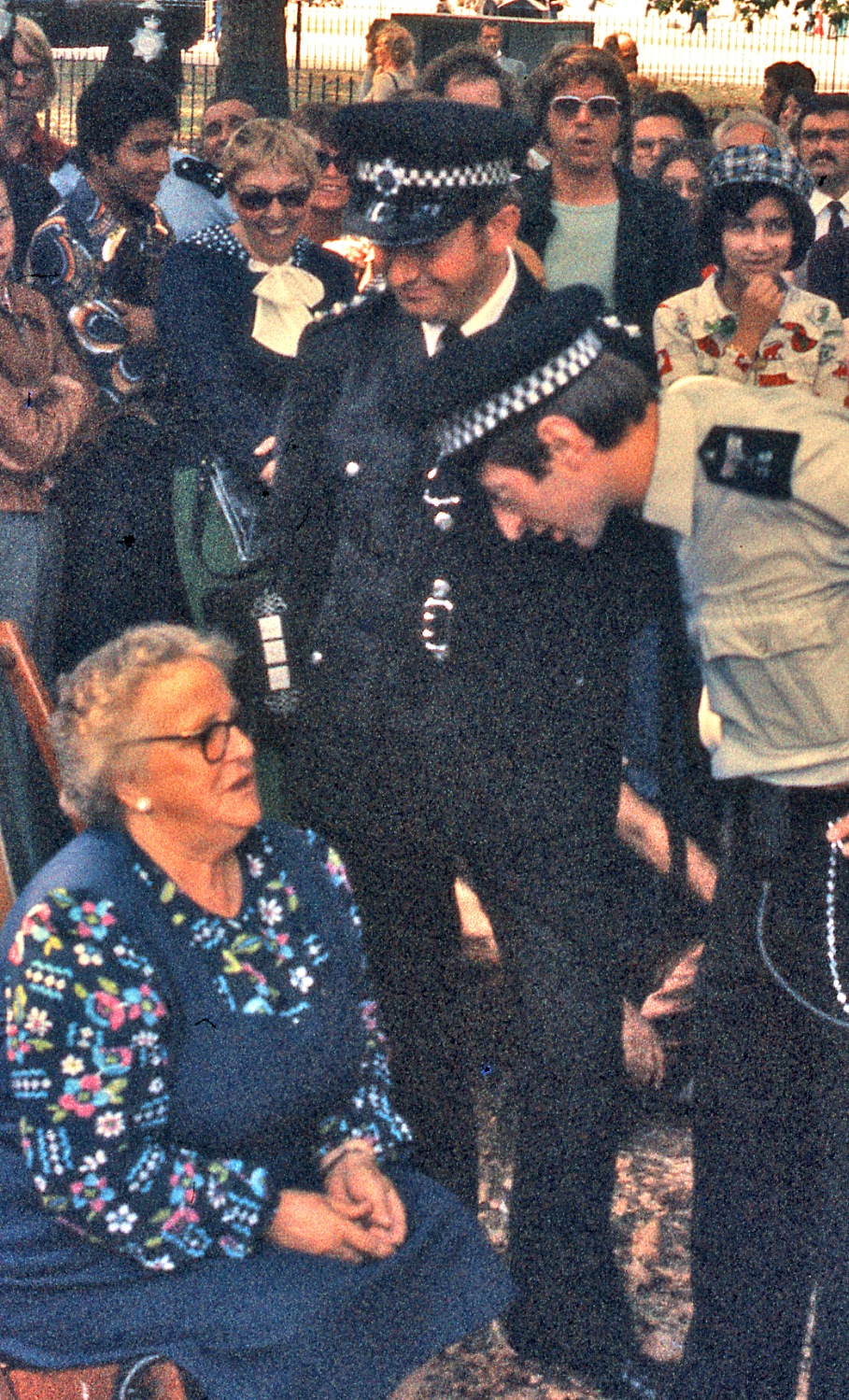
Metropolitan Police Officers in Hyde Park, 1976

London saw many protests during the 1950s and 1960s, turning violent on more than one occasion, with police clashing with violent protesters and making newspaper headlines. The Metropolitan Police realised it needed a unit specifically trained for public order duties and in 1961 formed the Special Patrol Group (SPG), whose officers received higher training in public order policing than ordinary officers on the beat. From 1973 until the 1990s the Metropolitan Police also faced the London facet of the Provisional IRA bombing campaign, involving a large number of bombings. This also included the Balcombe Street Siege from 6 to 12 December 1975, in which Provisional IRA members took a couple hostage in their home, while on the run from police.

On 1 February 1971, Karpal Kaur Sandhu, born in Zanzibar but of Indian heritage, joined the Metropolitan Police and thus became the Metropolitan Police's (and Britain's) first female Asian police officer. This was before India itself had female police officers (the first female police officer in India was Kiran Bedi in 1972). In 1973, the separate Women's Department was fully integrated into the Metropolitan Police. Female police officers did not get equal pay with male police officers until 1974.

Twelve officers in the Obscene Publications Branch were imprisoned for corruption in connection with bribes paid by James Humphreys.

In the Spaghetti House siege on 18 September 1975, alleged members of the Black Liberation Army attempted to commit an armed robbery at the Spaghetti House restaurant to gain publicity for their cause. However, the robbery was discovered by the Metropolitan Police, and the would-be robbers initiated a siege by taking hostages. In 1976 the first Woman Chief Superintendent was appointed to take charge of a subdivision. In 1977 Dee O’Donoghue became the first female traffic officer.

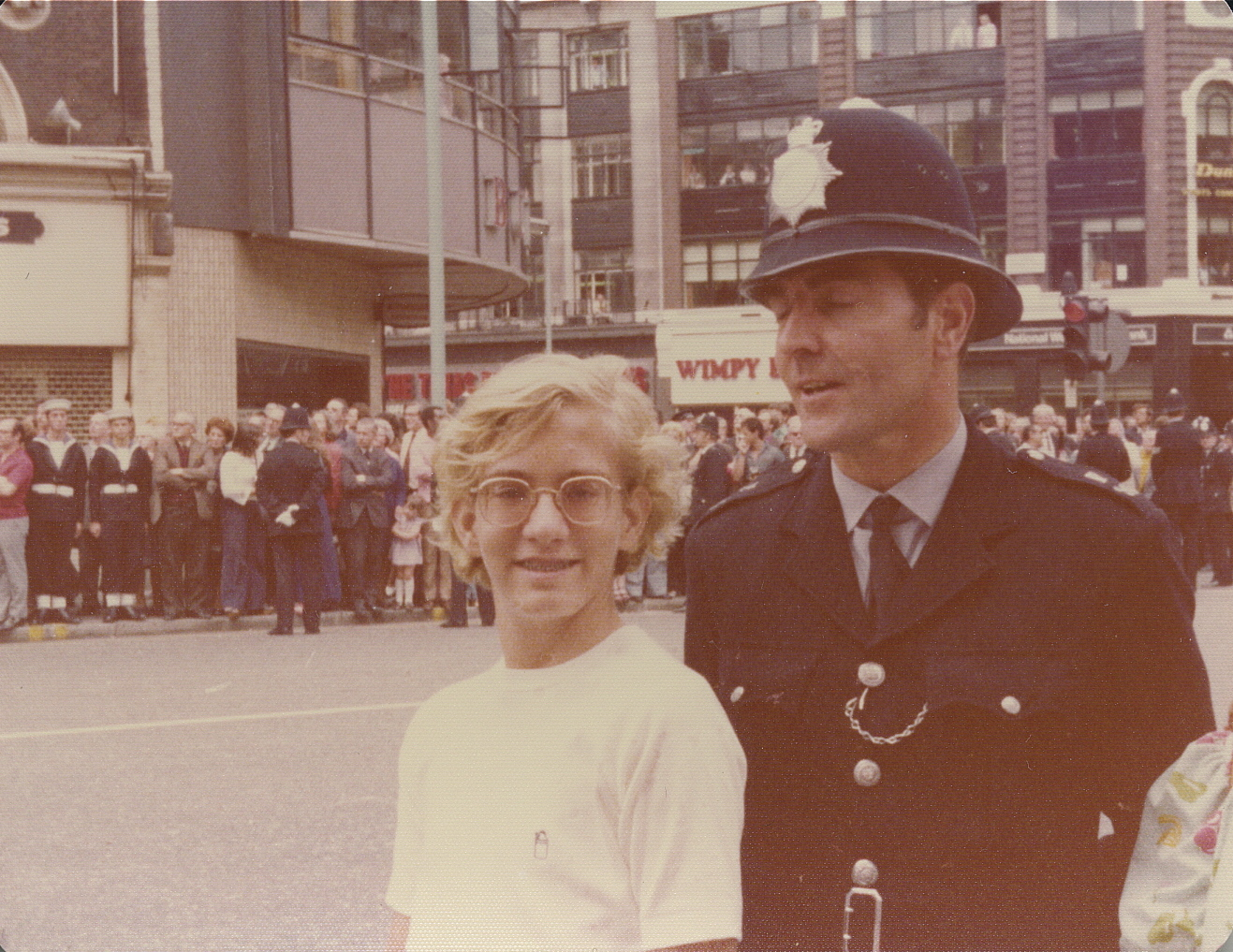
Met Police officer in 1974 wearing a blue shirt, which was phased out in the 1980s

The 1970s also saw frequent allegations of racism against the Metropolitan Police, such as the case of the Mangrove Nine in 1970 and the Notting Hill Carnival disturbances on 30 August 1976, leading to more than 100 officers being admitted to hospital. The late 1970s also saw Operation Countryman investigate allegations of corruption in the 1960s and 1970s. It concluded that there had been corruption at many levels. Only eight prosecutions were brought, but several hundred officers retired or resigned as a result.

1971 saw the appointment of the Met's first female dog handlers, WPCs Lyn Nicholson and Sandra Kerzten.

=== 1979–1985 ===
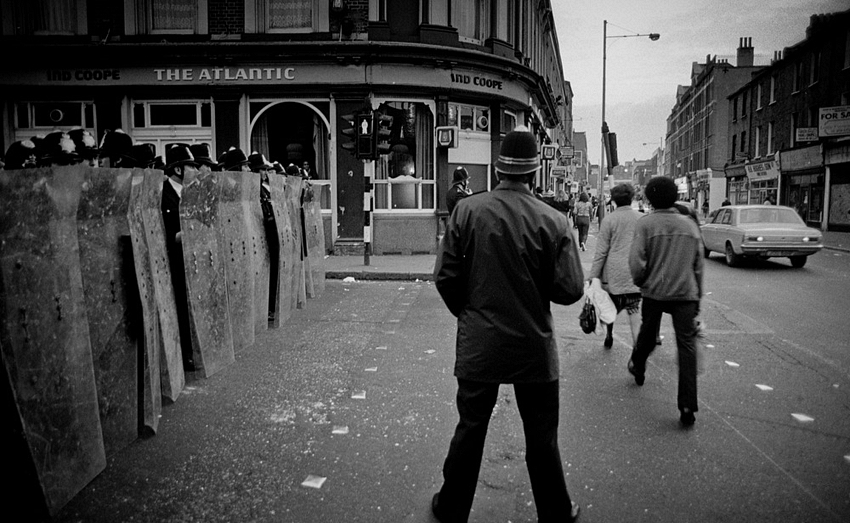
Brixton Riot 1981

The death of Blair Peach in April 1979 during a demonstration in Southall contributed to the disbandonment of the Special Patrol Group and its replacement by the Territorial Support Group in 1986.

The Met was heavily involved in negotiations during the 1980 Iranian Embassy siege, though these were terminated after six days and the British Army's Special Air Service (SAS) stormed the building.

During the early 1980s, the Met began Operation Swamp to cut street crime by the use of the sus law, which legally allowed officers to stop people on the suspicion of wrongdoing. The operation was associated with allegations of misconduct, leading to severe rioting on 11 April 1981. Following a public inquiry, the subsequent Scarman Report found that the Metropolitan Police were having problems regarding racial discrimination. Subsequent incidents of rioting later occurred in Brixton in 1985 and the Broadwater Farm estate in protests about police actions. During this riot, PC Keith Blakelock was murdered. Blakelock's murder remains unsolved.

A 1985 reorganisation established eight Areas made up of a total of 67 Divisions and Sub-Divisions, reduced to 62 spread over five Areas in 1995.

=== 1986–1992 ===
Metropolitan Police officers worked with the British Transport Police and neighbouring forces to arrest and convict John Duffy and David Mulcahy, for 18 rapes of women and young girls at or near railway stations in London and South East England and murdering three of their victims between 1982 and 1986. In 1986 Met officers also secured the conviction of Kenneth Erskine for a series of attacks in Stockwell on elderly men and women, breaking into their homes and strangling them to death. In March 1987 private investigator Daniel Morgan was murdered in Sydenham (south east London), in March 1987. He was said to have been close to exposing police corruption, or involved with Maltese drug dealers. Morgan's death has been the subject of several failed police inquiries, and in 2011 it was at the centre of allegations concerning the suspect conduct of journalists with the British tabloid News of the World. This unsolved murder has been described as a reminder of the culture of corruption and unaccountability within the Metropolitan Police Service. An independent enquiry in 2021 concluded that the Metropolitan Police were "institutionally corrupt" in its handling of the investigation into the murder of Daniel Morgan and that the force had placed protecting its reputation above the investigation.

Metropolitan Police officers assisted the British Transport Police during the 1987 King's Cross fire and the 1988 Clapham Junction rail crash.

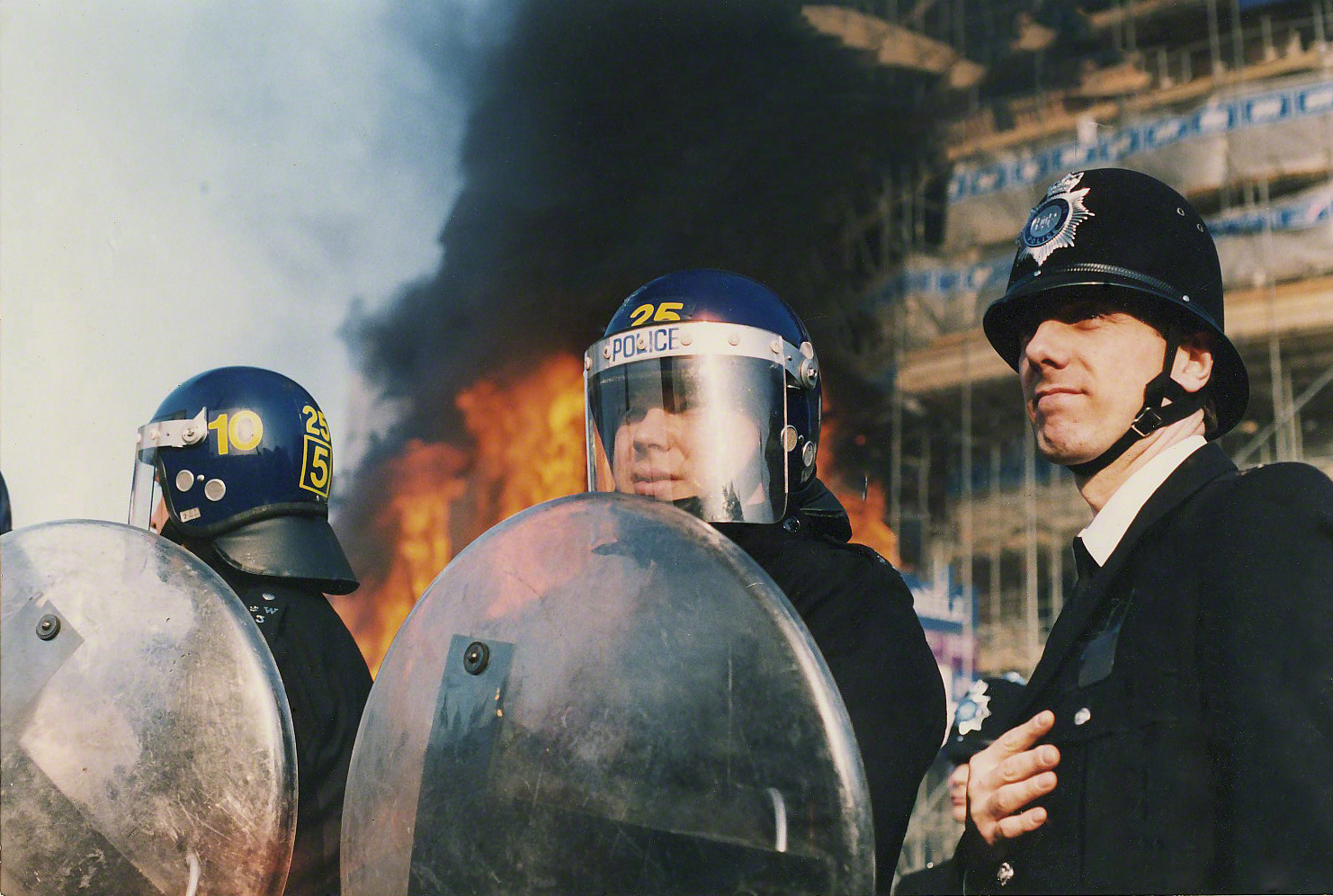
Poll Tax Riot, 1990

The official title was changed from "Metropolitan Police" to "Metropolitan Police Service" as part of the "PLUS Programme" in 1989, under the then Commissioner Sir Peter Imbert, following the presentation of a report entitled "A Service for Change: Report on the Corporate Identity of the Metropolitan Police" to the service's Policy Committee by Wolff Olins corporate identity consultants in August 1988. The Metropolitan Police Marine Policing Unit assisted in the aftermath of the 1989 Marchioness disaster, whilst in 1990 the Service was faced with the Poll tax riots. There was a great deal of media coverage of the 1992 killing of Rachel Nickell, after which a police sting operation against innocent prime suspect Colin Stagg was criticised as entrapment. Robert Napper, who committed a double murder in 1993, was convicted of the manslaughter of Nickell in 2008.

=== 1993–1999 ===
From 1993, a series of operations failed to convict the murderers of Stephen Lawrence, despite substantial evidence. The resulting MacPherson inquiry found that the Met was "institutionally racist". Tensions with the Black community also led to a third Brixton riot in 1995, arising from a large protest outside Brixton police station over the death of a local man in police custody – three police officers were injured and a two-mile exclusion zone was set up around Brixton. Later reports showed that the male in custody died of heart failure, said to be brought on because of difficulties restraining him.

1999 was a full year for the service, including the murder of Jill Dando, the 1999 London nail bombings, the fatal shooting of Harry Stanley 100 yards from his home by Metropolitan police officers in contentious circumstances, the dropping of the prefix "Woman" from female officers' ranks and the Macpherson Report, which stated that institutional racism existed in the service. In the two decades before 2010, more than 50 serving MPS officers died in service, with eight being murdered or fatally injured by an assailant.

1999 was also the year in which the Metropolitan Police District was finally made coterminous with Greater London and the old system of areas and divisions gave way to a system of one Borough Operational Command Unit (BOCU) for each of the thirty-two post-1965 London boroughs, each commanded by a Chief Superintendent (or a Commander for the City of Westminster), an arrangement that lasted until 2018.

== 21st century ==
=== 2000–2009 ===
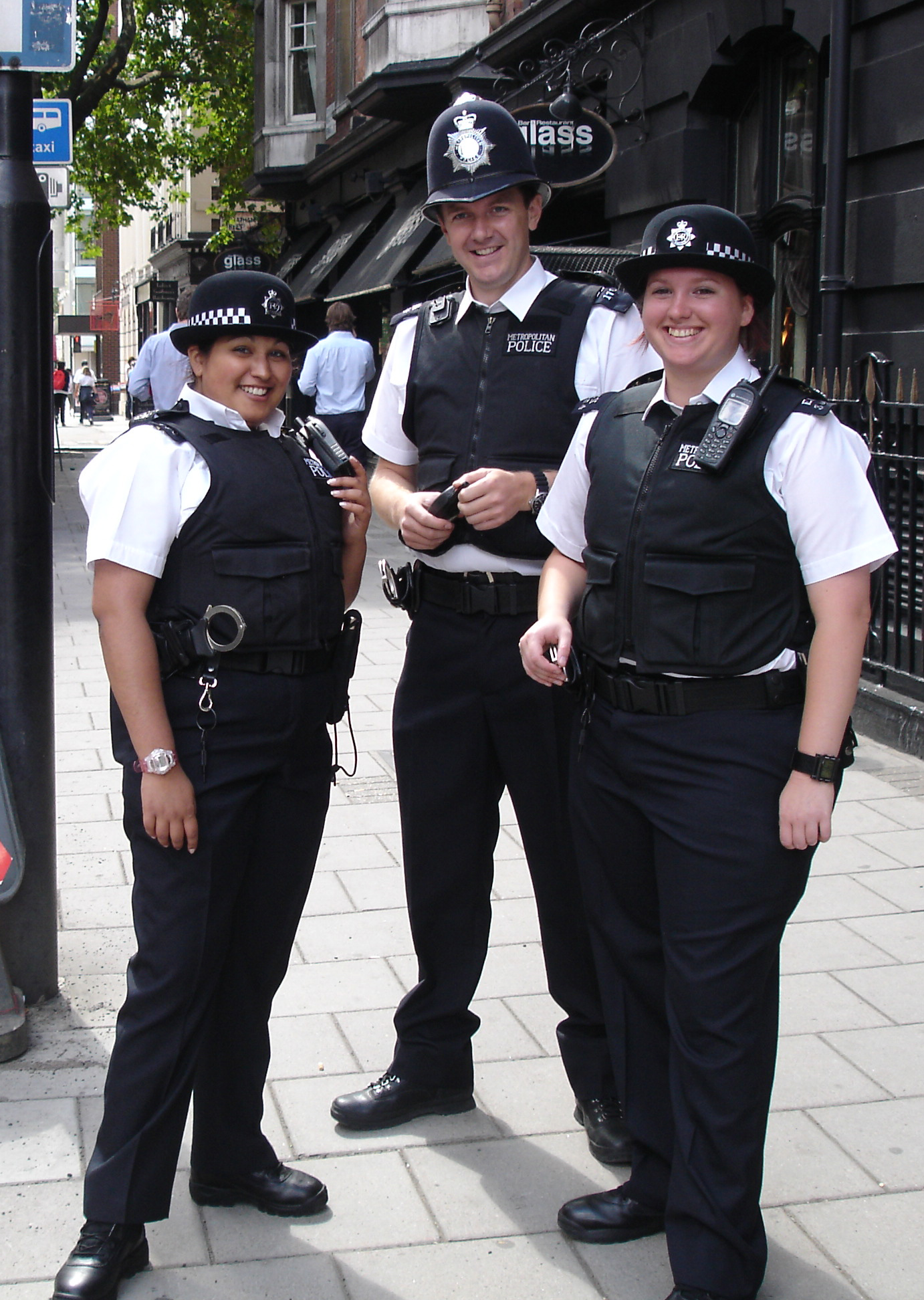
Metropolitan Police Service officers in Soho, London, 2007

The service continued to be overseen directly by the Home Secretary until 2000, when the newly created Greater London Authority was given responsibility to oversee the force, through the Metropolitan Police Authority. The MPA is made up of members appointed by the Mayor of London and the London Assembly, and several independent members. Parts of the Met district outside Greater London, such as Ewell, Loughton and Waltham Cross. were removed and added to the forces of surrounding counties. The Metropolitan Police Commissioner is still appointed by the Home Secretary. Thames Division was renamed the Marine Support Unit in 2001 and then the Marine Policing Unit in 2008.

In an attempt to control crowds during the 2001 May Day protest, the service employed the tactic of "kettling", and were criticised for detaining bystanders for long periods of time. That year, the dismembered body of a young boy believed to have been between the ages of four and seven was found floating in the River Thames, and named by police as Adam in the absence of a confirmed identity. During the investigation, a police commander and a detective chief inspector met with Nelson Mandela. The case was never solved. An internal report in 2002 arising from Operation Tiberius found that "Organised criminals were able to infiltrate Scotland Yard at will by bribing corrupt officers". Demonstrators protesting against the Hunting Act 2004 outside the Palace of Westminster in 2004 were involved in violent confrontations with Metropolitan Police officers.

The Metropolitan Police worked to a major incident plan to provide co-ordination, control and forensic and investigative resources after the 7 July 2005 bombings in 2005, though in the aftermath of multiple attempted attacks two weeks later officers mistook Jean Charles de Menezes for a suspected terrorist as he boarded a train and shot him dead in a deployment of Operation Kratos. In 2006, officers from the Met and other forces foiled a Transatlantic aircraft bomb plot, whilst Operation Trident officers also made the Met's largest ever seizure of firearms after a series of raids in Dartford, Kent named Operation Mokpo. Met bomb disposal officers defused a two car bombs in central London in 2007, with the perpetrators subsequently investigated and convicted. A 2007 cold case review of Stephen Lawrence's murder found a tiny speck of Lawrence's blood on a jacket belonging to Dobson and one of Lawrence's hairs on trousers belonging to Norris, leading to the conviction of Gary Dobson and David Norris on 3 January 2012. The pair were sentenced to life imprisonment, with a minimum term of 15 years 2 months for Dobson and 14 years 3 months for Norris.

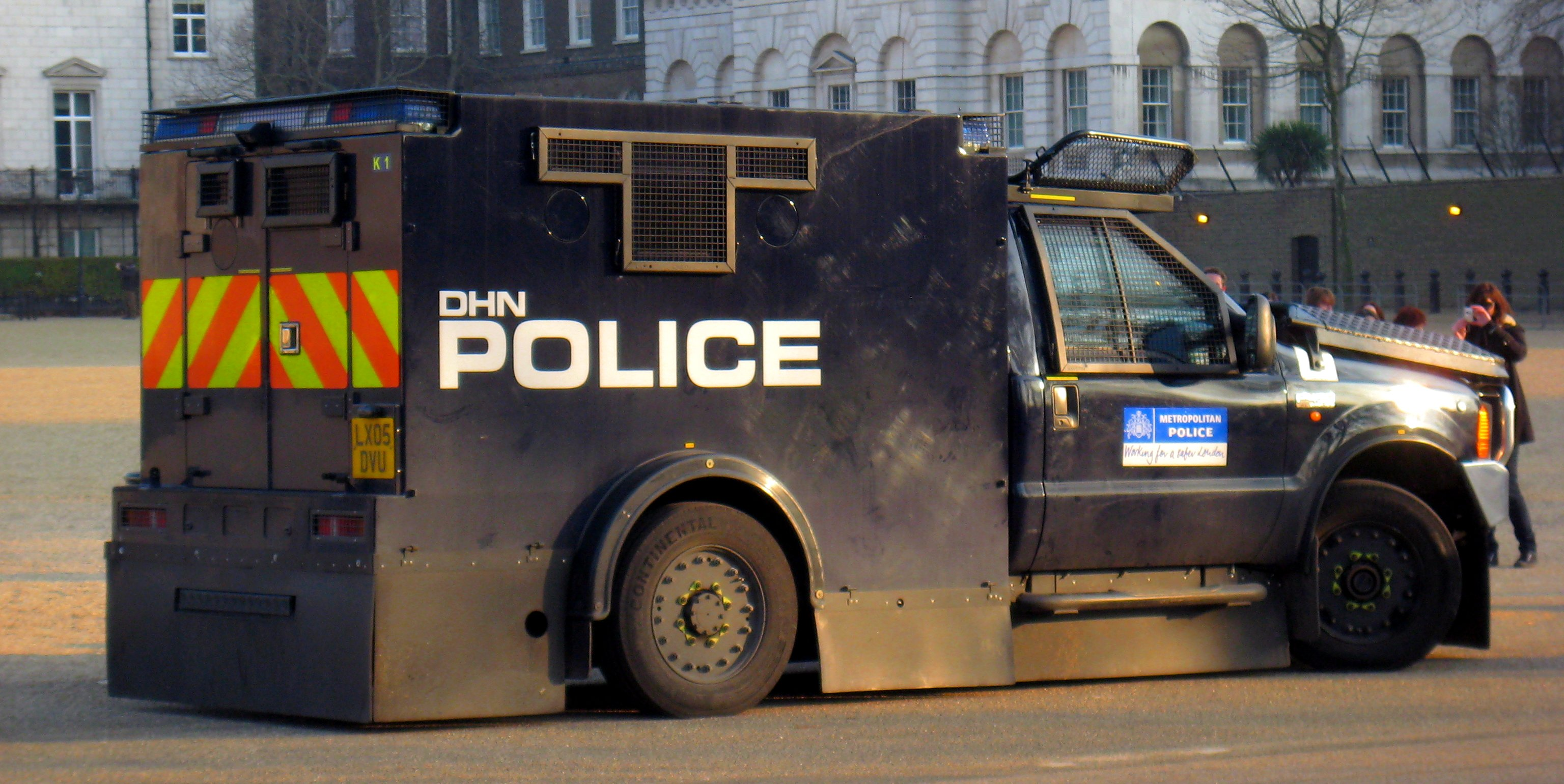
The Met deployed some of their specialist riot vehicles, similar to the one pictured, to the 2009 G20 London summit protests.

Following high-profile controversies involving high-ranking black officers, including allegations of racism made by Tarique Ghaffur – the highest ranking Asian officer in the Met – against commissioner Ian Blair, the National Black Police Association boycotted the Met in 2008 for racial discrimination. The Met once again used the "kettling" technique to contain large numbers of demonstrators during the 2009 G20 London summit protests. A bystander named Ian Tomlinson died from internal bleeding after he was hit with a baton and pushed to the ground by an officer of the Territorial Support Group. The jury at the inquest into Tomlinson's death returned a verdict of unlawful killing and the officer who pushed Tomlinson was later acquitted of manslaughter. Following a separate incident, a sergeant in the Territorial Support Group was suspended after being filmed striking a woman's face with his hand and her leg with a baton, but he was later cleared of any wrongdoing.

=== 2010–2014 ===
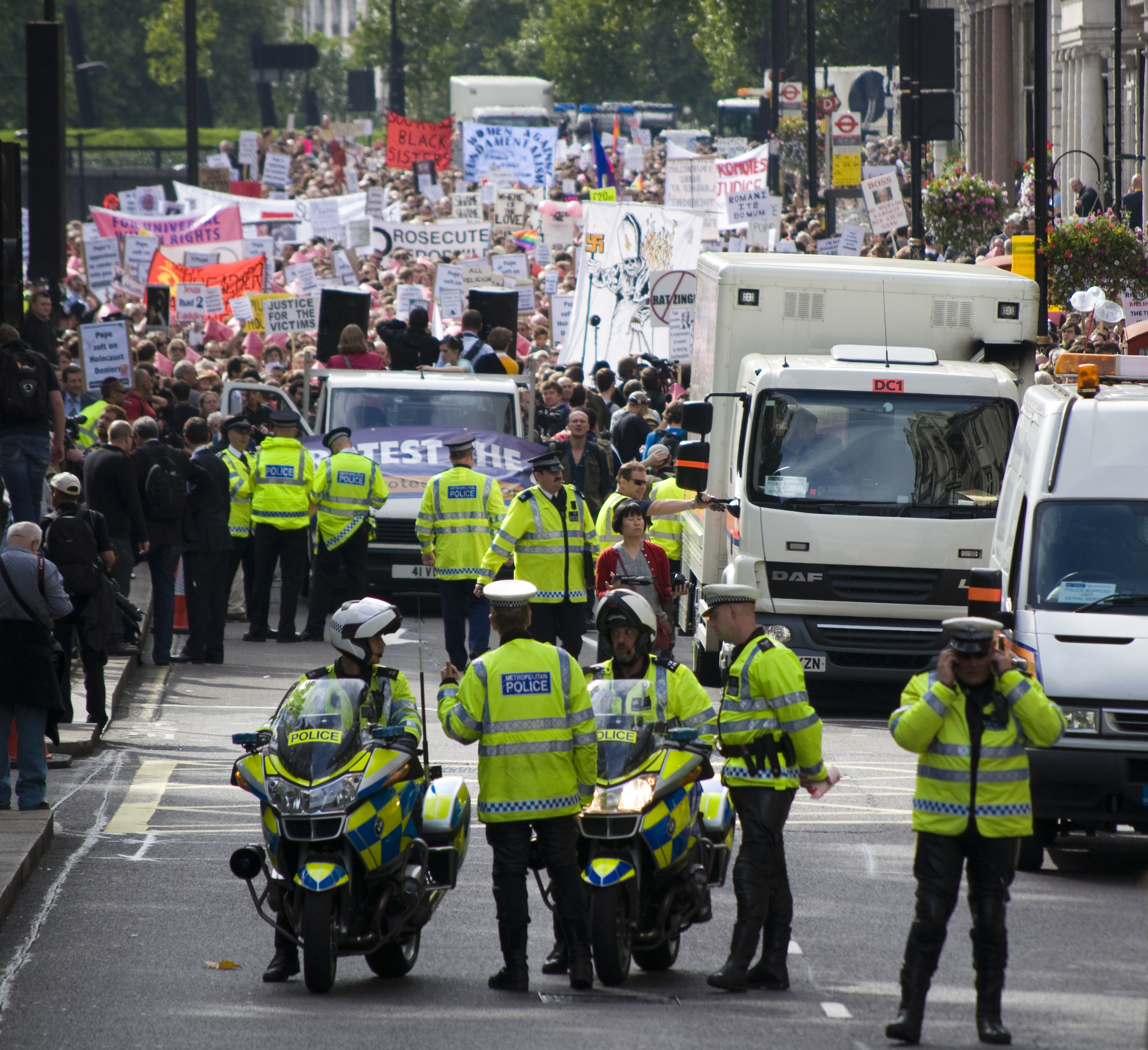
Metropolitan Police officers overseeing the "Protest the Pope" rally on 18 September 2010

The Met oversaw preparations for Pope Benedict XVI's 2010 visit, the first state visit to the UK by a pope. 201 people were arrested during the 2011 London anti-cuts protest, and 66 were injured, including 31 police officers, as up to 500,000 people demonstrated in central London against planned public spending cuts. It was described as the largest protest in the United Kingdom since the 15 February 2003 anti-war protests and the largest union-organised rally in London since the Second World War. The Met's Operation Minstead concluded after 12 years on 24 March 2011 with the conviction of the Night Stalker. Delroy Grant raped and assaulted elderly victims over a period of 17 years from 1992 to 2009 across south London, Kent and Surrey. He was found guilty of 29 charges, including burglaries, rapes and sexual assaults, but officers linked him to more than 200 different offences during the 1990s and 2000s. Grant was given four life sentences and ordered to serve a minimum of 27 years in prison. The 2006–2011 News International phone hacking scandal partly revolved around allegations that some Met officers accepted payment from journalists in exchange for information.

Around 5,000 Metropolitan Police officers were deployed to police the wedding of Prince William and Kate Middleton at Westminster Abbey on 29 April 2011. In advance of the event, assistant commissioner Lynne Owens said: "People who want to come to London to peacefully protest can do that but they must remember that it is a day of national celebration". Approximately one hundred people were pre-emptively arrested in advance of the wedding and were detained without charge for the duration of the wedding, with the apparent aim of suppressing protest. Other protestors were arrested on the day of the wedding; some were detained at railway stations on arrival. The Metropolitan Police said that one million people were present in London to watch the wedding procession. On 4 August the same year, Mark Duggan was shot by Metropolitan Police Service officers, triggering a series of public disturbances, initially in the Tottenham but spreading into many other areas of London and including instances of arson and looting. Dozens of officers were injured and the Met launched Operation Withern to investigate the disturbances. Also in 2011, the Home Office asked the Met to support the Portuguese Police with a review and subsequent investigation into the disappearance of Madeleine McCann in Portugal four years earlier, which became Operation Grange. The Home Office provided special funding for the operation, which up until September 2017 cost £11.1 million.

The 2012 Summer Olympics were the largest ever police deployment in the UK, including up to 10,500 Met officers deployed during the busiest days. The Met also established Operation Yewtree that year to investigate allegations against Jimmy Savile; in 2013 their findings on Savile were published in a joint report with National Society for the Prevention of Cruelty to Children called Giving Victims a Voice. Yewtree expanded to investigate allegations of sexual abuse unrelated to Savile and led to the convictions of Max Clifford and Rolf Harris, amongst others. Other celebrities were arrested and repeatedly bailed for months before being told they would not be charged. As a result, then-Home Secretary Theresa May proposed that bail time be limited to 28 days. The 28-day limit came into effect in April 2017.

In June 2013, the Met were exposed for sending an undercover officer to smear the friends and family of Stephen Lawrence. The following year it was revealed more than 4,600 children had been strip searched by the Metropolitan Police in the preceding five years, with the youngest being ten years old. This was out of a total of 134,000 strip-searched. A charity described the number of younger children searched in this way as being "disturbing". In October 2013 the Met, English Transport Police, City of London Police, and Transport for London jointly launched Project Guardian to reduce sexual harassment on public transport and increase reporting of sexual offences. The following month officers from the Met's human trafficking unit arrested two suspects in Lambeth who were alleged to have enslaved three women in a house for more than 30 years.

In September 2014 it launched the largest investigation since the 2005 bombings and attempted bombings after the disappearance of Alice Gross. That year it also launched Operation Midland after Carl Beech, then known publicly under the pseudonym "Nick", alleged that he had been the victim of a VIP paedophile ring and that he had witnessed them murder three boys decades earlier. Detective Superintendent Kenny McDonald issued a statement, in which he said that they believed Beech's allegations were "credible and true" but the probe was closed after 16 months when no evidence was found to corroborate the claims. A report by Richard Henriques detailed numerous failings by the Met and found that those accused were victims of false allegations, prompting then-Commissioner Bernard Hogan-Howe to apologise to them. Hogan-Howe called for the Met to change their approach to such allegations and no longer automatically believe complainants. Beech was convicted of charges related to lying to the police in July 2019 and was sentenced to 18 years in jail.

=== 2015–2019 ===
In 2015, former Metropolitan Police Special Branch officer Peter Francis revealed that the MPS has spied on several former and serving Labour MPs including Harriet Harman, Peter Hain, Jack Straw, Diane Abbott, Jeremy Corbyn, Bernie Grant, Ken Livingstone, Tony Benn, Joan Ruddock and Dennis Skinner. In response, Peter Hain stated: "That the special branch had a file on me dating back 40 years ago to anti-apartheid and anti-Nazi League activist days is hardly revelatory. That these files were still active for at least 10 years while I was an MP certainly is and raises fundamental questions about parliamentary sovereignty."

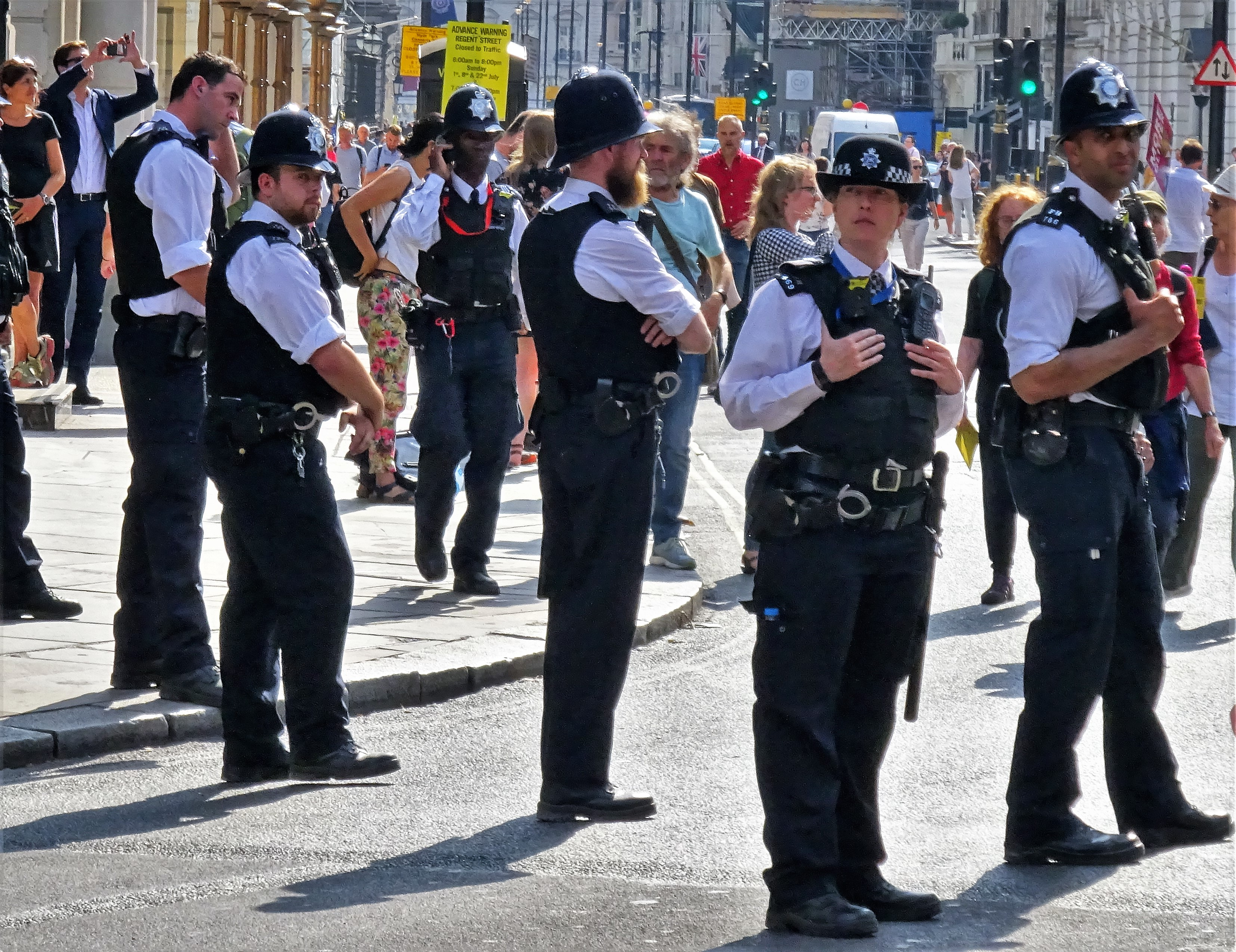
Met Police at a protest, 2018

In 2017, the Metropolitan Police stated that they would not investigate low level crimes and crimes where finding a suspect was unlikely, though serious crimes like violent offences would still be investigated. The Metropolitan Police justified this owing to recent budget cuts under the United Kingdom government austerity programme, but it was criticised in the press as giving the "green light" to thieves. 2017 also saw Cressida Dick became the first female Commissioner of the Metropolitan Police Service, a position often described in the media as the most senior police officer in the country, and New Scotland Yard reopen in its new site at the Curtis Green Building.

2017 also found the Met involved in countering and investigating terror attacks in Westminster (in which PC Keith Palmer was killed) and on London Bridge and Borough Market, as well as its officers using riot shields to protect firefighters from falling debris during the Grenfell Tower fire. The devastating fire led to an extensive forensic and criminal investigation involving around 250 Met officers. Commander Stuart Cundy said "I would like to reassure everybody that we will be looking at all criminal offences that might have been committed by any individual or any organisation." In 2018, its Counter Terrorism Command led the investigation into a chemical agent incident in Salisbury, Wiltshire, in which two couples were hospitalised over the course of three months.

=== 2020–present ===
On 3 March 2021, Sarah Everard disappeared in South London. On 10 March, she was found dead in Kent. On 12 March, Met PC Wayne Couzens was charged with kidnapping and murdering her. On 13 March, he was remanded in custody and – pleading guilty – was sentenced on 30 September the same year. The Met was criticised for its reaction to a vigil-turned-protest for Everard, which was held on 13 and 14 March. The vigils – in which hundreds of people gathered in close proximity – were illegal owing to laws implemented to reduce the spread of COVID-19. The actions of the police were supported by Her Majesty's Inspectorate of Constabulary and Fire & Rescue Services (HMICFRS), who had been asked to investigate the actions of the police. Their review, published on 30 March, found that the police had "reacted appropriately and were not heavy handed" and were "justified" in their stance with respect to the Covid regulations, saying that the risks of transmission were "too great to ignore".

The HMICFRS report also said "Condemnation of the Met’s actions within mere hours of the vigil – including from people in positions of responsibility – was unwarranted, showed a lack of respect for public servants facing a complex situation, and undermined public confidence in policing based on very limited evidence." They also said that the police response was a "public relations disaster" with a "materially adverse effect on public confidence in policing"; the review added, "We acknowledge that a more conciliatory response might have served the force's interests better." HMICFRS also concluded that the Met had incorrectly interpreted coronavirus-related restrictions owing to legal confusion, and that not all demonstrations during a Tier 4 lockdown are unlawful. A whistleblower alleged that the reviewers had demonstrated a pro-police and anti-protestor bias while compiling the report, with the reviewing panel composed almost entirely of police officers. Four members of Reclaim These Streets took legal action against the Metropolitan Police, claiming that their human rights to freedom of speech and assembly had been breached in connection with their attempt to organise the vigil. The case was heard in January 2022, and a judgment delivered on 11 March 2022 said that the Met's decisions in the run-up to the event were "not in accordance with the law". The Met has said it will appeal against the judgment.

In March 2021, PC Ben Hannam was found guilty of belonging to neo-Nazi group National Action. In June 2021, an independent panel inquiring into the 1987 murder of Daniel Morgan released their report. The report branded the Metropolitan Police "institutionally corrupt" and personally censured its current Commissioner, Cressida Dick, for obstruction of the investigation, leading to calls for her resignation.

In March 2022, Her Majesty’s Inspectorate of Constabulary and Fire & Rescue Services issued a report that was critical of the Met in respect of the measures it takes to tackle corruption. The report included the comment: "Its [the Met’s] apparent tolerance of the shortcomings we describe in this report suggests a degree of indifference to the risk of corruption."

In July 2023, the Met reached a financial settlement with the Morgan family. The settlement and the earlier reports reinforced concerns that misconduct investigations and internal accountability mechanisms within the Met remained insufficiently robust. Following the report, the Met committed to make structural reforms.

On 23 January 2025, HMICFRS announced that the Met would be removed from the "Engage" enhanced‑monitoring status and return to routine monitoring. The decision was based on demonstrated improvements in areas including faster emergency response times, better performance on cases involving exploited children, and improved professional standards.

According to a 2025 press release, improvements included more than 86% of 999 calls answered within 10 seconds (77.6% more than the previous year), increased staffing of child protection and domestic‑assault teams, and 500 additional officers deployed to neighbourhood policing.

== See also ==
- Bow Street Museum of Crime and Justice
- Crime Museum
- Metropolitan Police Museum
- History of criminal justice § Modern police
- History of law enforcement in the United Kingdom
- List of medals awarded to Metropolitan Police officers
