= Bow Street Runners =

London police force founded in 1749

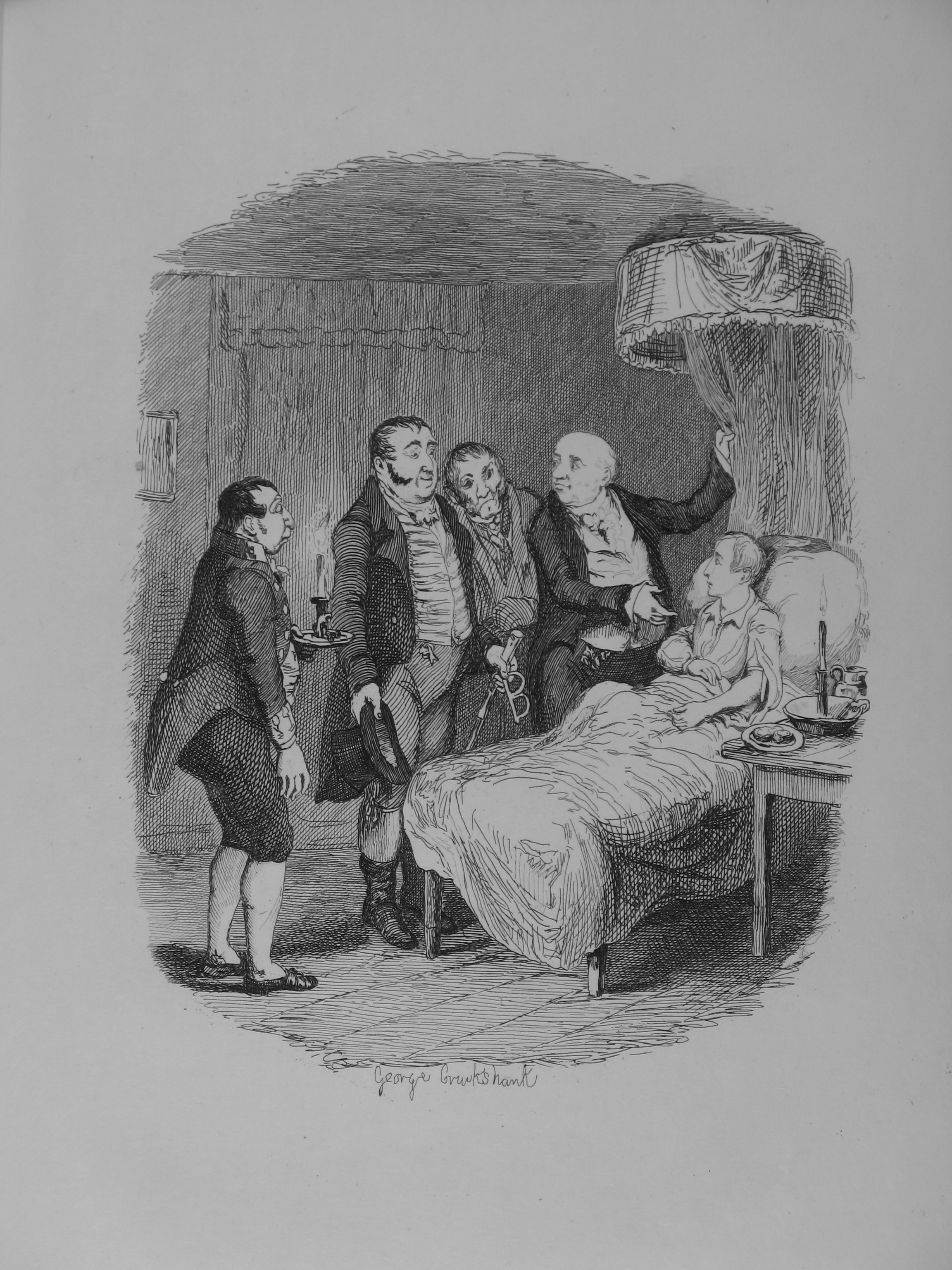
- "Oliver waited on by Bow Street Runners", an engraving in The Writings of Charles Dickens, volume 4, Oliver Twist
- Named after: Bow Street Magistrates' Court
- Predecessor: Thief-takers
- Successor: Metropolitan Police
- Formation: 1749; 277 years ago
- Founder: Henry Fielding, John Fielding
- Founded at: Bow Street Magistrates' Court, London
- Dissolved: 1839; 187 years ago
- Headquarters: Bow Street Magistrates' Court, London
- Methods: Arrest, apprehension, conviction
- Magistrate: Henry Fielding
- Magistrate: Sir John Fielding
- Parent organization: British Crown Court

The Bow Street Runners were the law enforcement officers of the Bow Street Magistrates' Court in the City of Westminster. They have been called London's first professional police force. The force originally numbered six men and was founded in 1749 by magistrate Henry Fielding, who was also well known as an author. His assistant, brother, and successor as magistrate, John Fielding, moulded the constables into a professional and effective force. Bow Street Runners was the public's nickname for the officers although the officers did not use the term themselves and considered it derogatory. The group was disbanded in 1839 and its personnel merged with the Metropolitan Police, which had been formed ten years earlier but the London metropolitan detective bureau trace their origins back from there. The brothers set up horse patrols in 1753 which made their group much more advanced.

== Policing before 1749 ==
The Bow Street Runners are considered the first British police force. Before the force was founded, the law enforcement system was in the hands of private citizens and single individuals with very little intervention from the state. A police force like the Maréchaussée already present in France would have been ill-suited to Britain, which saw examples such as the French one as a threat to their liberty and balanced constitution in favour of an arbitrary and tyrannical government. The enforcement of the law then was mostly up to the private citizens, who had the right and duty to prosecute crimes in which they were involved or in which they were not. At the cry of "murder!" or "stop thief!", everyone was entitled and obliged to join the pursuit. Once the criminal had been apprehended, the parish constables and night watchmen, who were the only public figures provided by the state and who were typically part-time and local, would make the arrest.

As a result, the state set a reward to encourage citizens to arrest and prosecute offenders. The first of such rewards was established in 1692 in the amount of £40 for the conviction of a highwayman and in the following years it was extended to burglars, coiners and other forms of offence. The reward was to be increased in 1720 when, after the end of the War of the Spanish Succession and the consequent rise of criminal offences, the government offered £100 for the conviction of a highwayman. Although the offer of such a reward was conceived as an incentive for the victims of an offence to proceed to the prosecution and to bring criminals to justice, the efforts of the government also increased the number of private and unofficial thief-takers, who would solve petty crime for a fee.

Thief-takers became infamously known not so much for what they were supposed to do, catching real criminals and prosecuting them, as for "setting themselves up as intermediaries between victims and their attackers, extracting payments for the return of stolen goods and using the threat of prosecution to keep offenders in thrall". Some of them, such as Jonathan Wild, became infamous at the time for staging robberies in order to receive the reward.

== History ==
=== Origins ===
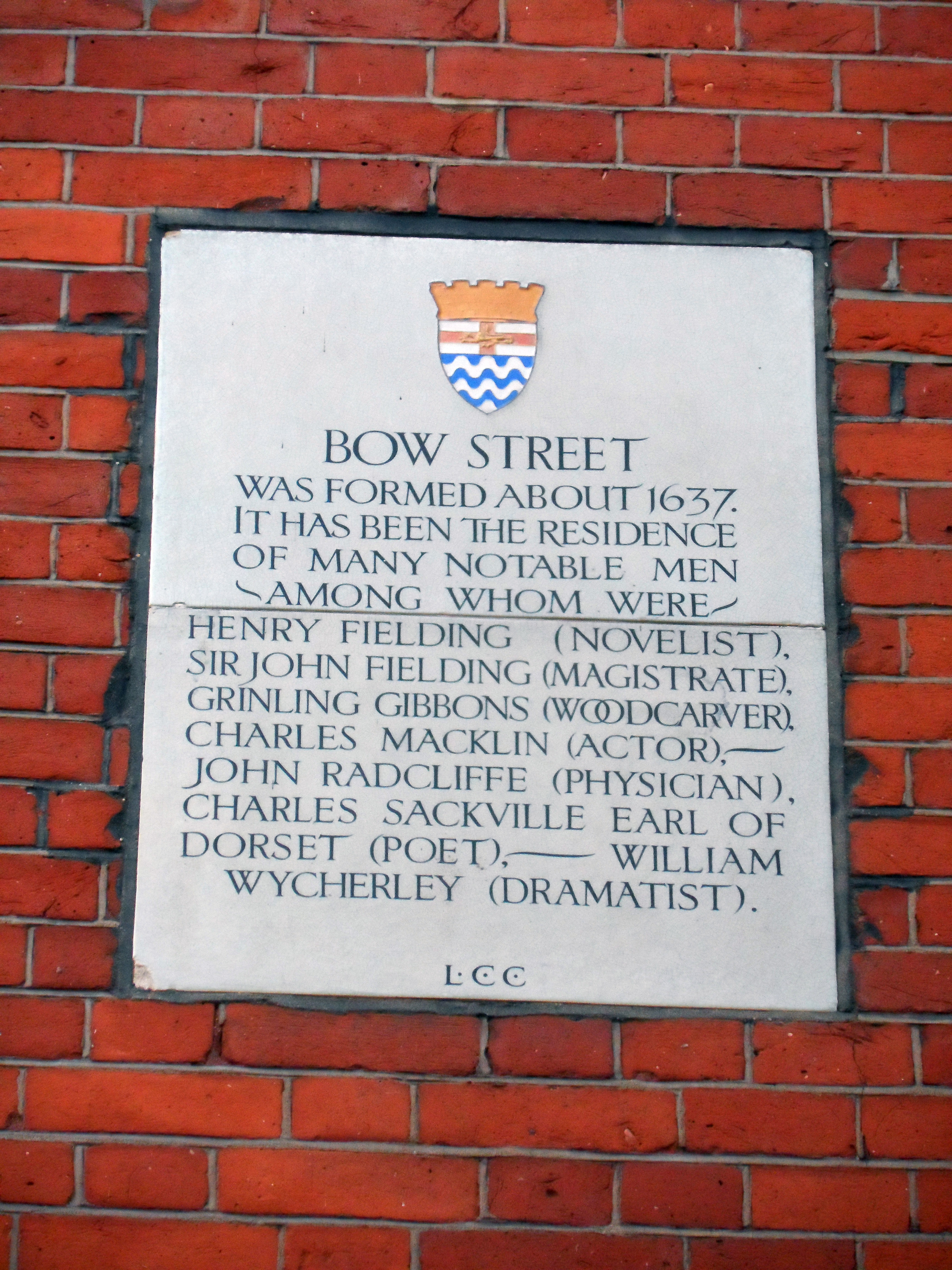
Plaque at 19–20 Bow Street

Magistrate Henry Fielding decided to regulate, regularise, formalise and legalise the thief-takers' activity due to high rates of corruption and mistaken or malicious arrests, therefore creating the Bow Street Runners. His Runners were not dissimilar to the thief-takers, but differed from them in their formal attachment to the Bow Street magistrates' office and in being paid by the magistrate with funds from central government. They worked out of Fielding's office and court at No. 4 Bow Street, and did not patrol but served writs and arrested offenders on the authority of the magistrates, travelling nationwide to apprehend criminals.

Henry Fielding's work was carried on by his brother Justice John Fielding, who succeeded him as magistrate in the Bow Street office. Under John Fielding, the institution of the Bow Street Runners gained more and more recognition from the government, although the force was only funded intermittently in the years that followed. It served as the guiding principle for the way that policing developed over the next 80 years. Bow Street was a manifestation of the move towards increasing professionalism, beginning in London.

=== Henry Fielding (1750–1754) ===
Thomas Pelham-Holles, 1st Duke of Newcastle turned to Henry Fielding for help. Fielding had become a Westminster magistrate in 1748 and in his house in Bow Street, Covent Garden, he had started a kind of magisterial work that was different from anything that had been done before. Taking up the legacy of his predecessor, Sir Thomas de Veil, Fielding turned Bow Street into a court-like setting in which to conduct examinations.

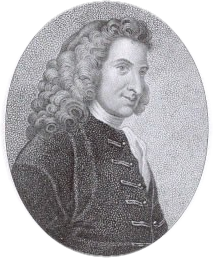
Henry Fielding

However, his reformed method was not limited to his magisterial activity in Bow Street; it was also extended outside of the magistrate's office. In fact, since 1749–50 Henry Fielding had begun organising a group of men with the task of apprehending offenders and taking them to Bow Street for examination and commitment to trial. Such an organised intervention was needed, according to Fielding, because of the difficulties and reluctance of private citizens to apprehend criminals, especially if those were part of a gang — reluctance largely caused by the fear of retaliation and by the extremely high costs of the prosecution that would have to be paid by the victim of the crime. This activity, however, was very similar to the thief-takers' enterprise and, as such, it could have been considered as corrupt as the latter. Therefore, Fielding wrote a number of pamphlets to justify the activity of thief-taking; he argued that the legitimacy of this activity had been undermined by the actions of a few (see for example Jonathan Wild) and that, in fact, thief-takers performed a public service where the civil authorities were weaker. Another step towards the legitimation of the activity of the Bow Street Runners concerned the lawfulness of an arrest made by an ordinary citizen. Fielding made clear that constables were not the only ones to have the right to make an arrest, but under special circumstances – such as with a warrant issued by a magistrate – also private citizens could act against a suspected criminal and arrest them.

Another problem that Fielding had to face was that of the economic support of the Runners; without any direct funding from the government, the men at Fielding's service were left relying on the rewards issued by the state after an offender's conviction and by private citizens in order to retrieve their stolen goods. It is also true that many of the original Runners were also serving constables, so they were financially supported by the state. Nevertheless, the problem persisted and, in 1753, Fielding's initiative came close to failing when his men had stopped their thief-taking activity for some time. A way out of this situation came in the same year, when the government lamented spending too much money on rewards with no apparent decrease in the crime rates. At this point, the Duke of Newcastle, the secretary of state at the time, asked Fielding for advice, which he presently gave. The document that Fielding presented to the government revolved around the activity of the Bow Street officers; Fielding's suggestion included that he be given more money in addition to his own magistrate's stipend for two main purposes. The first was, of course, to offer economic support to the officers working in Bow Street, which would have allowed these men to extend their policing activities well beyond the simple thief-taking. The other purpose was to advertise the activity of the Bow Street office and to encourage private citizens to report crimes and provide information about offenders; the advertisements would be published in the Public Advertiser, a paper in which, as some critics have pointed out, the Fielding brothers had a financial interest.

In late 1753, the government approved Fielding's proposal and established an annual subvention of £200, that allowed Fielding not only to support the advertisement and the Bow Street officers but also to maintain a stable group of clerks who kept detailed records of their activities. A new kind of magistrate's office and policing activity was therefore established; after the death of Henry Fielding in 1754, it was carried on by his brother John, who had overseen the whole project and was to further expand and develop it over the following years.

=== Sir John's Runners (1754–1780) ===
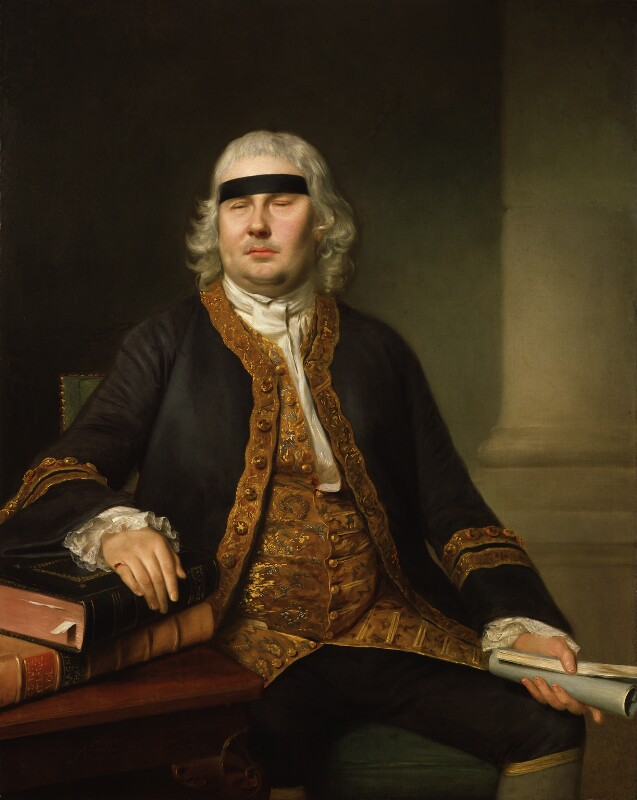
Sir John Fielding

When Henry Fielding died in 1754, he was succeeded as Magistrate by his brother Sir John Fielding, who had previously been his assistant for four years. Known as the "Blind Beak of Bow Street", John Fielding refined the patrol into the first truly effective police force for the capital, later adding officers mounted on horseback, and remained chief magistrate of Westminster until his death in 1780.

As soon as he was appointed, John Fielding examined the activity of the Bow Street office and the issues that needed to be addressed; the financial contribution from the state was still in place, so his pamphlet focused mainly on the need to tackle violence and highway robbery in particular. At the beginning, Fielding shared his office with Saunders Welch, an energetic former grocer elected High Constable of Holborn. Eventually, the government agreed to establish a separate magistrate office from which Welch could operate, leaving Fielding as the dominant presence in Bow Street. Over the years, the government subvention raised from the initial £200 to £400 in 1757 and to £600 by 1765, as Fielding managed to persuade the Duke of Newcastle, now First Lord of the Treasury, of the increasing costs of an active policing and advertising, as well as of the need of recruiting a permanent clerical staff for the office. The administration of the funds was left largely in Fielding's hands. He provided payments to six officers, for investigating and attempting to apprehend offenders, and occasionally to a few assistants.

During John Fielding's time as a magistrate, the Bow Street office seems to have been open for most of the day and for most days of the week, even when Fielding was not himself in the office, and there was always a so-called 'ordinary' to whom one could report offences also during the night-time. One of the main activities carried out by clerks and assistants in the office was to collect and record information about offences and offenders, therefore creating a sort of criminal database that could turn useful to officers in their investigating activities. Fielding believed that a national system of criminal information circulating throughout not only the metropolis of London but also the entire country would ensure that offenders would be arrested and brought to justice; moreover, anyone contemplating an offence would be deterred from doing so.

In addition, he introduced innovations at the Bow Street office that would have a great effect on the first procedures of criminal prosecution. Fielding created a court-like setting that could attract and accommodate a large audience for his examinations of suspected offenders, opened and available for the public for long and regular hours. In doing so, he turned the office from being the mere house of a magistrate to being the Bow Street Magistrates' Court in which several justices were employed in rotation in order to keep the office open for long hours every day. This process of transformation was further amplified by Fielding's success in encouraging the London press to attend and provide their readers with a weekly report on his activity.

=== John Fielding's legacy (1780–1815) ===
Just after John Fielding's death in 1780, the crisis of the administration of criminal law renewed itself, primarily for three different factors. The first was the rise in crime rates because the end of a period of war (in this case the American Revolution) and the consequent return in the country of many soldiers and sailors, who were now out of a job. The second factor was directly linked to the first and concerned the issue of transportation to the American colonies, which had been established in 1718 and begun the principal sanction imposed on convicted felons. The loss of the American territories resulted in convicts piling up in inadequate jails, as they continued to be sentenced to transportation, without an actual destination. The government was forced to find either an alternative destination for convicts sentenced to transportation or an alternative sanction. The third factor concerned the events that took place in London in June 1780, known as the Gordon Riots during which the authorities lost control of the streets of the city. Those events highlighted the weakness of London policing and magisterial system.

The government responded by establishing the Home Department in 1782, therefore allowing the administration of criminal law to receive more focused attention than before. In time, this office would provide a centre to deal with all the aspects of criminal administration. In 1782 it also supported the new Bow Street Foot Patrols. Eventually, in 1785, the Home Department attempted to introduce and pass 'A Bill for the further Prevention of Crimes, and for the more speedy Detection and Punishment of Offenders against the Peace, in the Cities of London and Westminster, the Borough of Southwark, and certain Parts adjacent to them', which was meant to provide a measure of central control over the many police forces across the metropolis but failed to do so. Some elements were derived from the existing institutions, particularly Bow Street, but the concept of the metropolis as a unified district and a central command overseeing many policing divisions was completely new.

Middlesex Justices Act 1792
- Act of Parliament
- Parliament of Great Britain
- Long title: An Act for the more effectual Administration of the Office of a Justice of the Peace, in such Parts of the Counties of Middlesex and Surrey, as lie in and near the Metropolis, and for the more effectual Prevention of Felonies.
- Citation: 32 Geo. 3. c. 53
- Territorial extent: Great Britain

Dates
- Royal assent: 15 June 1792
- Commencement: 31 January 1792 (Note: Start of session.)
- Repealed: 22 June 1802
Other legislation
Repealed by	Metropolitan Police Magistrates Act 1802

Status: Repealed

Text of statute as originally enacted

In addition to the reform of the structure of the London policing forces, the bill included clauses aimed at the prevention of crime, such as giving police preventive powers to search and arrested on suspicion. An example is when they arrested Colonel Edward Despard, for provoking the Despard Plot. In 1792, Parliament did pass legislation that introduced some reform to the system, the Middlesex Justices Act 1792 (32 Geo. 3. c. 53) which contained two elements of the 1785 bill: one was the establishment of public offices where magistrates monopolized the administration of criminal law throughout the metropolis, and the other was the increase in the powers of the police. The act was mainly based on the model presented by the Bow Street office and on Fielding's conception of the magistrate and of how to deal with crime, therefore leading to the replication of the Bow Street structure throughout London.

Under the new legislation, the Bow Street office maintained a privileged position among the other offices of the metropolis, due to the closer relationship of its magistrates with the Home Office and to the financial resources at their disposal, regulated by an informal agreement with the Treasury rather than by legislation, therefore increasing the policing resources available. This made it possible for the government to use the Runners and the patrolmen as they thought necessary, increasing their range of investigation, that now included more engagement with threats to national security and social disorder, as can be seen by the fewer and fewer accounts of Runners giving evidence in trials at the Old Bailey.

=== The Runners' last years (1815–1839) ===
In the new century, crime rates diminished in the metropolis, therefore the contribution of the Runners to the policing of property offences decreased considerably; they continued to investigate offences in London, but not as actively as they had before. Their incomes from London crime diminished as the position that Bow Street had once held in the commitment of felons to trial continued to erode with the expansion of the patrol and the creation of new police offices from 1792. By the early 1820s, Bow Street was responsible for just over 10% of the accused felons being committed to trial at the Old Bailey. After 1815, the Runners' most regular employment was to respond to help requests from prosecutors outside London. These were likely cases in which their skill and experience was thought to be useful in investigating offences in the provinces.

After the Metropolitan Police Act 1829, which established the Metropolitan Police, the policing responsibilities of the Bow Street magistrates were very considerably diminished. The Bow Street patrol was gradually absorbed into the new police force and Bow Street was left with only the Runners. Even then, the Home Office held much of the authority over the activity of the Runners and was mainly concerned to bring Bow Street's finances under control. The Bow Street magistrates' effective loss of authority over the activity of the Runners and the government's concern to control costs meant that the funds for the office were much diminished in the 1830s.

In 1834, a parliamentary committee recommended that the Bow Street men and constables should be incorporated with the Metropolitan Police as soon as possible and, although this report was not enforced, their conclusions were taken up and expanded by another committee in 1837. The reports of these committees were enacted into law as a renewal of the Police Act in 1839 and, in doing so, made the Runners at Bow Street redundant.

== Policing activity ==
Bow Street's involvement in a case began quite simply with the arrival of a victim or a messenger who wanted to report a crime. This was encouraged by the promise of a reward to the messenger (usually a shilling) and of a paid advertisement in one or more papers of the stolen goods. Fielding believed strongly in the importance of a rapid spread of information and therefore advertising was very important to his policing strategy. Of course, this included also the advertising of the activity carried out in Bow Street, as well as exhortations to victims to report offences and any kind of information on criminals and stolen goods.

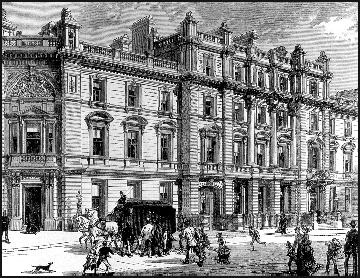
Bow Street office in the late 19th century

In case of robbery or other serious offences, Bow Street officers were immediately involved and dispatched. The success of their detection work and of the apprehension of offenders relied on the rapid collection and communication of information about the crime committed and on the descriptions of the offenders. Officers could go out on their own initiative to investigate an offence, as essentially they were hired by the victims to give them help. Most victims were expected to pay the expenses of the investigation and to offer a small reward for information as well. They would also have to face the expenses of an eventual trial, even though if the offender was convicted they would have had the right to receive financial compensation from the court.

Later, as a response to the numerous reports of attacks by footpads and highwaymen, Fielding decided to send some men to patrol the squares of Westminster and the highways leading into the city, also on horseback from 1756, though by 1766–67 horseback patrolling had been sharply curtailed, due to the excessive costs. Nevertheless, two 'pursuit horses' were maintained to send officers to patrol roads from time to time. The patrol activity of the Bow Street officers is an indicator of a fundamental characteristic of the Bow Street policing system, which is its undefined geographical range. In fact, the officers were not restricted to a particular area of the city but were able to operate across the entire metropolis, and also beyond London itself. To facilitate the reach of the office, Fielding was named in the commissions of the peace of Kent, Essex and Surrey, in addition to those of Middlesex and Westminster. That meant that the Bow Street officers did not have to seek the assistance of local magistrates in the counties surrounding London in order to make an arrest or carry out a search. Otherwise, they would have had to seek such assistance, although in practice there was not any impediment to their working wherever their enquiries took them, as some accounts from 1756 show that they pursued suspects into Hertfordshire, Bedfordshire and even to Bristol.

Fielding's policing system relied very much on the information provided by informants, to whom were directed the many pamphlets and advertisements published by the Bow Street office. Turnpike gatekeepers and publicans were therefore encouraged to report crimes and offences as soon as possible to Bow Street, in order to allow Fielding's men to presently seek out and apprehend the offenders.

== See also ==
- Blackstone novels
- Bow Street Magistrates' Court
- Bow Street Museum of Crime and Justice
- City of Vice
- City of London Police
- Thomas de Veil
- Henry Fielding
- John Fielding
- Law enforcement in the United Kingdom
- Metropolitan Police
- Old Bailey
- Police officer
- Private police
- Richmond
- Thief-taker

== Bibliography ==
- Armitage, Gilbert (1932). The history of the Bow street runners, 1729-1829. London: Wishart.
- Beattie, J. M. (2012). The First English Detectives. The Bow Street Runners and the Policing of London, 1750–1840. Oxford University Press. ISBN 978-0-19-969516-4.
- Cox, David J. (2010). Oxford Dictionary of National Biography. Entry on: Ruthven, George Thomas Joseph (1792/3–1844). Oxford University Press. OCLC 25847300.
- Fielding, Henry (1751). Enquiry into the causes of the late Increase of Robbers.
- Fielding, John (1755). A Plan for Preventing Robberies within Twenty Miles of London, with an Account of the Rise and Establishment of the real Thieftakers. London.
- Hichcock, T.; Shoemaker, R. (2006). Tales From the Hanging Court. London: Bloomsbury. ISBN 978-0-340-91375-8.
- Newman, Gerald (1997). "Bow Street Runners". Britain in the Hanoverian age, 1714–1837: an encyclopedia (Chapter: Bow Street Runners). London: Taylor & Francis. ISBN 0-8153-0396-3.
- Senior, Hereward (1980). Constabulary: the rise of police institutions in Britain, the Commonwealth, and the United States. Toronto: ON: Dundurn Press. ISBN 1-55002-246-6.
