= List of medals awarded to Metropolitan Police officers =

This page is a list of medals awarded to Metropolitan Police officers since the force's formation in 1829.

Since the creation of the MPS in 1829, 2 Albert Medals, 174 King's Police Medals for Gallantry (including 33 for entering waters to save life, 41 for stopping runaway horses, and 26 for saving lives by entering burning buildings) 30 King's Police and Fire Services Medals, 4 Queen's Police Medals for gallantry awarded posthumously, 5 George Crosses, 123 George Medals (including 85 for connection with war activities), 81 British Empire Medals for gallantry, and 49 Queen's Gallantry Medals have been awarded to officers.

== Albert Medal ==
=== In gold ===
- 1885 - PC William Cole, A Division, for actions containing a bomb attack on Westminster Hall

=== In bronze ===
- 1918 - Inspector Frederick Wright, for helping rescue thirteen people during a Zeppelin raid in Camberwell in October 1917

== King's / Queen's Police Medal ==
Created in 1909 to recognise bravery during the Tottenham Outrage, it was renamed the King's Police and Fire Services Medal from 1940 to 1954. Since 1977 acts of gallantry in the police service have normally been awarded the George Cross, George Medal, Queen's Gallantry Medal or the Queen's Commendation for Bravery instead.

=== For gallantry ===
- 1909 - PC Charles Eagles, PC John Cater and DC Charles Dixon, for bravery during the Tottenham Outrage
