= Gilbert Armitage =

British lawyer and journalist (1905–1967)

Gilbert Armitage (c. 1905 – 28 May 1967) was a British lawyer, critic and journalist who was associated with Percy Wyndham Lewis.

Armitage wrote for the Yorkshire Post in the 1930s where he was a contemporary of Hugh Ross Williamson, Brooke Crutchley, Iverach MacDonald, Charles Davy and Colin Brooks. Among the journals that he contributed to were Scrutiny: A Quarterly Review, Julian Symons' Twentieth Century Verse and the English Review. He was a member of the Whitefriars and Coningsby clubs.

Armitage's Banned in England was inspired by the 1932 trial and conviction of Count Geoffrey Potocki de Montalk for obscenity.

Armitage died in Farnham Common on 28 May 1967 at the age of 62.

== Selected publications ==
- Banned in England: An Examination of the Law Relating to Obscene Publications. London: Wishart, 1932. (Here & Now Pamphlets. No. 7.)
- The History of the Bow Street Runners, 1729-1829. London: Wishart, 1932.
