= William Cole (police officer) =

British police officer (1840-1900)

Sergeant William Cole AM (c. 1840 – 21 November 1900) was a London police officer who was awarded the Albert Medal for helping to contain a bomb attack on 24 January 1885.

In Westminster Hall at the Chapel of St Mary Undercroft (the Crypt Chapel), Cole was notified by a visitor about a smoking black bag on the lower steps leading up from the Chapel into Westminster Hall. Upon examination, he realized it contained dynamite and a lighted fuse. He rushed up the steps with it into Westminster Hall, intending to deposit the device in New Palace Yard but before he could reach the door, a hot substance from the bag scalded his hand, causing him to drop it, and as he did so it exploded. He and a colleague, P.C. Cox, were thrown into the large crater torn into the floor of the Hall. Seconds later, another device exploded in the empty chamber of the House of Commons of the United Kingdom, causing extensive damage, and a third at the Tower of London. All the bombings were committed by the terrorist group known as the Fenians, the precursors to the Irish Republican Army, nationalists battling British rule in Ireland.

Unconscious and badly injured, Cole and his colleague were taken to hospital, where they were visited by the Home Secretary, Sir William Harcourt. Cole's actions had saved the lives of bystanders. Harcourt recognised Cole's gallantry in "knowing full well the terrible risk he incurred", and sought the Queen's approval for him to receive the Albert Medal. The award was approved a week later. Cole, who had been promoted to sergeant on 2 February 1885, very soon after the incident, was presented with the medal on 26 March by Harcourt at an impressive gathering in Westminster Hall attended by the Prime Minister, W.E. Gladstone, the Speaker (Arthur Wellesley Peel), and many members of the Lords and Commons.

== Last years ==
Cole's injuries would force him to live most of his remaining years as an invalid, nursed devotedly by his wife. He retired on pension a year later, on 21 April 1886. He died, aged 60, on 21 November 1900 after undergoing further surgery at Westminster Hospital. His widow was granted a Civil List pension of £30 p.a. by King Edward VII.
