= Thomas de Veil =

English magistrate (1684–1746)

Colonel Sir Thomas de Veil
- Born: 21 November 1684; St Paul's Churchyard, Ludgate Hill, City of London, London
- Died: 7 October 1746 (aged 62); Bow Street, Covent Garden, Westminster, London
- Resting place: Denham, Buckinghamshire
- Occupation: Justice of the Peace
- Years active: 1726-1746
- Successor: Henry Fielding

Sir Thomas de Veil (21 November 1684 – 7 October 1746), also known as deVeil, was Bow Street's first magistrate. He was known for having enforced the Gin Act 1736, and, with Sir John Gonson, Henry Fielding, and John Fielding, was responsible for creating the first professional police and justice system in England.

== Early life ==
Thomas de Veil was born in St Paul's Churchyard, London, in 1684. The identity of his parents needs to be clarified: while a contemporary biographer had pinpointed Revd. Dr. Hans de Veil as his father, the parish of St Augustine, London, records the birth of a Thomas de Veil to Lewis de Compiègne de Veil and his wife, Anne, on 21 November 1684. While the name of his father remains unsettled, it is known he was a Frenchman originally from the Lorraine, and that he was a Huguenot.

De Veil is said to have left home when he was 15 years old to learn the trade of mercer in a shop on Queen street, near Cheapside. When his master's business failed after several months, De Weil enlisted as a private in the War of the Spanish Succession. He fought at Cadiz and Vigo in 1702 and at Almanza in 1707, and caught the attention of Colonel Martin Bladen, with whom he remained friends for the rest of his life, and the Earl of Galway, who would then bestow upon him a troop of dragoons.

By the time the war ended in 1713, Thomas de Veil had attained the rank of lieutenant colonel in the Red Regiment of Westminster. Returning to England, he borrowed a great deal of money to restore his fortunes, which in turn led to a considerable debt. He retired to the countryside and lived upon the half pay provided by the army until he had dispensed of his debts, upon which he returned to London in search of a second source of income, and became a political lobbyist with an office in Whitehall: his work at this time consisted of "soliciting at the war-office, the treasury, and other public boards, drawing petitions, cases, and representations, memorials, and such kind of papers, for which he kept an office in Scotland-yard". Thanks to his diligence, and the interest of many former acquaintances like Martin Bladen, he was made a justice of the peace and was appointed to the commissions of the peace of Middlesex and Westminster in 1729.

== Career ==
Soon after being appointed to the commissions of the peace he opened his first office in Leicester Fields, conducting criminal hearings there. He would move to Thrift Street, Soho, sometime in either 1737 or 1738, and finally to Bow Street in 1740. He would be the first magistrate to set up court there, effectively creating the Bow Street Magistrates' Court.

From 1729, when he was first appointed Court Justice, until his death, he was the most active magistrate in London, and would provide the public access to his services on a regular basis. He broke up many criminal gangs, the most famous (and the one from which he gained the most recognition) being that led by William Wreathock, a Hatton Garden attorney, in 1735. He was “more willing than most” to implement the ill-fated 1736 Gin Act, and in this period had to implement the Riot Act several times. He personally investigated serious crimes, solving some of the most notorious cases of his era, though his work was primarily magisterial. He was noted to be rigorous in interviewing suspects and in arranging follow-up enquiries, prosecuting frauds, and suppressing attacks on informers. In September 1744, after the City's deputy marshal, Mr Jones, requested assistance from Middlesex peace officers, he attempted to promote co-operation between the fragmented police forces in the capital.

As a reward for his magisterial work, and to allow him to focus on it, in 1738 he was granted a sinecure as Inspector of Imports and Exports, a job with minimal duties and a salary of £600 per year, and received an additional grant of £100 in 1740. In further recognition of his work he was knighted in 1744, and was given the rank of colonel of militia to facilitate his responsibilities with internal security in wartime.

His success and professionalism in his work, however, made him the subject of several assassination plots. In one attempt in 1731, de Veil was stabbed in the stomach by Mr John Webster, an Irish "trading justice" who had been angered by de Veil's correction of one of his cases. Another failed attempt in 1735 led Julian Brown, a member of the Wreathock gang who was tasked with killing de Veil, to become a key witness against his former master instead.

== Personal life ==
Sir Thomas de Veil (left) in masonic clothing, as depicted by William Hogarth in Night, part of his series of engraving Four Times of the Day

Little is known of Sir Thomas de Veil's personal life. He was a freemason, and he was a member of the Lodge meeting at Vine Tavern, together with William Hogarth. The two did not see eye to eye on many issues, the best known – and the one that led Hogarth to parody him in Night, part of the set of prints titled Four Times of the Day – being the Gin Act 1736.

De Veil married four times and had twenty-five children, very few of whom survived him.

He married his first wife, Mrs Anne Hancock (1685–1720) from the Thomond family, on 27 January 1704 at St-Martin-in-the-Fields, Westminster, and they had a son and a daughter, both dead by 1746. Little is known about his daughter, other than that she married a Mr Thomas and died in 1746, while slightly more is known about his son. Known as Reverend Hans de Veil, he was born in 1704 and died in 1741. He studied in Cambridge, and would go on to become a school master in Flastead, in Essex. He also wrote several pieces of poetry, translated some texts from French, and wrote an essay entitled "An Essay Towards a Solution of the Horizontal Moon".

De Veil met his second wife, Elizabeth, at the New Exchange in the Strand, and soon thereafter married her "purely from the motive of affection". He would have at least three children by her, a son Robert Thomas de Veil who, at the time of Sir Thomas' death, was abroad, and two daughters: Catherine née de Veil the wife of Elias Phillip Delaporte (1716–1757), an attorney of Staple Inn; and Mary Margaret née de Veil (born 1722), married firstly Francis Wright (1717–1744), a "linnen [sic] draper" from Cheapside, and secondly Basil Bacon (1725–1775) of Shrubland Hall, Barham, Suffolk and Moor Park, Farnham.

His third wife, Alice née Kingsman (died c1735) whom he married in the Whitehall Chapel on 29 May 1730, was the sister of an attorney in Gray's Inn; while the fourth, Anne Bedell, whom he married in 1737, was a lady with a vast fortune.

At the time of his death, de Veil was a widower, and his only surviving children were from his second wife.

=== Lewis de Veil ===
While not certain, it seems probable that his father was Lewis de Compiègne de Veil (1637–1710). Lewis was born Daniel Levy, the son of David Levy, a rabbi, and Magdalain Jathon in Metz. His father died in 1650 and he, his two brothers and a sister were left with his mother. In 1652 Jacques-Bénigne Bossuet came to Metz as Archdeacon and started preaching to try to convert the Jewish community. His elder brother converted on 8 September 1654, taking the name Charles-Marie de Veil - the de Veil probably taken from an ancestral home in a village named Weil. The following year Daniel converted at Compiègne with King Louis XIV and his mother Anne of Austria as his godparents. He took the baptismal name of Louis de Compiègne de Veil. The third brother was baptised in 1669 at Cleve, taking the name Frederick Ragstatt de Weille; his sister also took the name de Weille.

Louis was a linguist and translated tracts by Maimonides from Hebrew into Latin; in 1671 he was appointed Professor of Oriental Languages at Heidelberg University. By 1673 he had returned to Paris as Interpreter of Oriental Languages in the King's library. Within a few years Louis converted to Protestantism and, fled France for London, following his brother Charles-Marie. By 1680 he was in the household of John Tillotson then Dean of Canterbury.

His son Thomas was born in 1684; in 1685 he was licensed to teach letters in the City of London, and was denizenated on 9 April 1687. He died in London in about 1710.

== Controversies ==
Some considered de Veil a "trading justice"; however, the meaning of the term is somewhat ambiguous. In some cases a "trading justice" was a magistrate who would rely solely upon the fines for their income, while in others it referred to someone who took bribes, and/or who would encourage litigation to earn more money. In the former case, the title could certainly be applied to him; in the latter case, however, there appears to be no real evidence to corroborate the suggestion.

A stronger case could be made for the charge that he accepted sexual favours from prostitutes in exchange for leniency in their trials. His biographer would admit that "his greatest foible, was a most irregular passion for the fairer sex". Some, however, have suggested that his relationship with brothel keepers may have allowed him to control the trade – although, if true, this association would also have given the madams some hold over him. Again, no documented evidence is known to support these claims.
