= Bow Street Horse Patrols =

London police force founded in 1763

The Bow Street Horse Patrols were mounted police organised in London, England, to combat highwaymen. They were the first uniformed police force in the country. First established in October 1763 by Sir John Fielding, the magistrate at Bow Street Magistrates' Court, London's police headquarters. Their creation was made possible with a government grant of £600 for a civilian "night horse patrol" to protect travellers from highwaymen. The horse patrol was initially made up of eight men, later increased to ten, armed with a cutlass, pistol and truncheon. They patrolled the main turnpike roads surrounding London reaching as far as Kent. However, never regarded as a permanent force the government grant was withdrawn the following year and the patrol disbanded, only two mounted 'pursers' were retained at Bow Street Magistrates Court.

In 1805 the mounted horse patrol was reintroduced by Bow Street's chief magistrate (1800 - 1806) and home secretary Sir Richard Ford. The new horse-patrol was 52 men and two inspectors, some sources say 54 men including six inspectors. In uniform for the first time, they patrolled principal roads surrounding London, starting around 5pm within six miles of Charing Cross, proceeding to ten miles distance from the city and then retired at midnight. The horse patrols extended as far as Kent, Sussex, and Essex and were mostly concerned with preventing or capturing highwaymen and footpads.

The patrol was recruited from men who had served in the cavalry regiments, they had to be at least 5 feet 5 inches tall. They were armed with truncheons and pistols and told to greet every traveller with the words "Bow Street Patrol". The patrol had a reputation for being a "roisterous body of men".

The Bow Street Horse Patrols were sworn in by the chief magistrate of Bow Street and empowered to act as constables throughout Middlesex, Surrey, Essex, and Kent. They were under the direct command of the Home Office.

In 1806 Sir Richard announced that the horse patrol had succeed and London's roads were free from highwaymen.

From 1805, the horse patrols introduced a uniform of a distinctive scarlet waistcoat under their blue greatcoats, they were nicknamed "Robin Redbreasts". The uniform was later adopted by the "Police Dismounted Horse-Patrol" formed in 1821. Like the Bow Street Foot Patrols, they were merged into the Metropolitan Police by the Metropolitan Police Act 1839.

== See also ==
Bow Street Runners
