= Bow Street Foot Patrols =

The Bow Street Foot Patrols were an armed and salaried foot patrol set up in London, England, in the winter of 1782–83 by Sampson Wright (Note: John Fielding's successor as chief magistrate at Bow Street, he resided in Bow Street from 1782 to 1792.) and supported by the new Home Department of the British government. The government provided funds to support 46 men who worked in eight groups of six; each of the groups was assigned to one of the major routes around the metropolis and went out every night of the week.

Like the Bow Street Horse Patrols, the Foot Patrols were intended to deter highway robbery and became an established element of London policing in the 1780s. The Foot Patrols and the Horse Patrols both ran in tandem with the new Metropolitan Police from 1829 to 1839, before being absorbed into it.

== Bibliography ==
- Beattie, J. M. (2012). The First English Detectives. The Bow Street Runners and the Policing of London, 1750–1840. Oxford University Press. ISBN 978-0-19-969516-4.
- Hetherington, Fitzgerald Percy (1888). "The Patroles". Chronicles of Bow Street Police-Office: With an Account of the Magistrates. London: Chapman and Hall. OCLC 25847300.
