= Coronation Medal =

Coronation Medal may refer to:

- King Edward VII Coronation Medal (1902)
- King Edward VII Police Coronation Medal (1902)
- King George V Coronation Medal (1911)
- King George V Police Coronation Medal (1911)
- King George VI Coronation Medal (1937)
- Queen Elizabeth II Coronation Medal (1953)
- King Charles III Coronation Medal (2023)
