= Frederick Wensley =

British police officer and Chief Constable (1865–1949)

Frederick Porter Wensley
- Wensley in 1930
- Born: 28 March 1865; Taunton, Somerset
- Died: 4 December 1949 (aged 84); Palmers Green, Middlesex
- Military career
- Branch: Criminal Investigation Department, (CID), Metropolitan Police
- Service years: 1888-1929
- Commands: Chief Constable of the Criminal Investigation Department (1922–1929)
- Awards: Officer of the Order of the British Empire; King's Police Medal; Queen's Police Diamond Jubilee Medal; Edward VII Police Coronation Medal

Frederick Porter Wensley OBE KPM (28 March 1865 – 4 December 1949) served as a British police officer from 1888 until 1929, reaching the rank of chief constable of the Scotland Yard Criminal Investigation Department (CID). Serving in Whitechapel for part of his career, he was involved in street patrols during the investigation of the Jack the Ripper murders, details of which he would later publish in his memoirs in 1931. He was one of the 'Big Four', a nickname given to the four Superintendents in charge of the Metropolitan Police CID, with his murder investigations regularly published in the press. The leading prosecuting barrister Sir Richard Muir referred to him as "the greatest detective of all time".

== Life and career ==
Frederick Porter Wensley was born on 28 March 1865 in Taunton, Somerset. His father, George Wensley, was a bootmaker. The family later moved to London, where Frederick became a telegraph messenger before joining the Metropolitan Police in January 1888 at the age of 22. In 1893, he married Laura Elizabeth Martin, they had two sons and a daughter. Both sons were later killed in France during the First World War.

In 1895, Wensley entered the CID as a probationary detective constable and was promoted to detective sergeant three years later. He first gained public attention in 1896 when he was responsible for capturing a burglar and murderer named William Seaman in a fight in Whitechapel in front of a crowd. Seaman had just murdered a pawnbroker named John Goodman Levy and his housekeeper, Mrs Sarah Gale (Seaman would later insist Levy was a fence of stolen goods). Unable to get out of the house on the ground floor, Seaman worked his way to the roof and was followed by Wensley. A fierce fight between the men occurred while a crowd collected. In the end Wensley managed to subdue Seaman. Seaman would later hang for the murder of Levy and Mrs Gale, placed between Milsom and Fowler the "Muswell Hill" murderers, to make sure that Fowler did not try to kill his partner as he had tried to do at their trial.

In November 1909 Wensley, now a detective inspector, was awarded the newly instituted King's Police Medal. Between December 1910 and January 1911 he was closely involved in the siege of Sidney Street in the East End of London. This included leading the hunt for the armed fugitive anarchist group. Once the group was located in Sidney Street, he came under direct fire from the sieged house.

On 1 June 1920, Chief Inspector Wensley was made a member of the Order of the British Empire (MBE), and in December 1921, now a Superintendent, he became head of the CID at Scotland Yard. In March 1922, Wensley was appointed to the new post of Chief Constable of the CID, having overall command of some 800 detectives in the London area, including 150 working directly from Scotland Yard. In June 1928 he was promoted to officer of the Order of the British Empire (OBE).

On 31 July 1929, Wensley retired from the Metropolitan Police after 41 years’ service. He died on 4 December 1949.

== Controversial cases ==
Wensley's actions in two of his cases have been questioned over the years. In the "Clapham Common" Mystery of 1911, linked by the press to the Sidney Street siege, the chief suspect, Steinie Morrison may have been observed unfairly by witnesses shepherded by Wensley. Wensley always continued to believe that Morrison killed the victim Leon Beron for his money (Beron carried a large sum on him at all times).

The other controversial case was that of Edith Thompson and Frederick Bywaters, both executed in 1923 for the stabbing murder of Edith's husband Percy the previous year. This case was notable because Mrs Thompson appears never to have been linked to the murder committed by her lover, except for letters she wrote to Bywaters suggesting she was trying to poison Percy. Sir Bernard Spilsbury tested for poison, but found nothing. It is likely that Thompson was actually convicted (like Florence Maybrick over thirty years earlier) for committing adultery. Initially she claimed she did not know who attacked Percy. However, Bywaters had been caught already, and Wensley wanted to test his theory of a joint murder plot. While Thompson was crossing the floor after being questioned, she saw Bywaters being led across in a different direction. She apparently collapsed and said, "Oh, why did he do it?!"

Wensley also worked on the murder of Frenchwoman Emilienne Gerard, whose body was discovered on 2 November 1917. He interviewed Gerard's lover, Louis Voisin, and arrested him after discovering that he misspelt "bloody" in the same way as the murderer, who had left "blodie Belgium" at the crime scene.

== Published works ==
While Wensley's memoirs appear under the more common title of Forty Years of Scotland Yard, they were originally published in London under the title Detective Days and were only renamed upon subsequent publishing in New York City. In them, Wensley downplayed his own role in the investigation of the Ripper murders:

Not that I had much to do with it. In common with hundreds of others I was drafted there, and we patrolled the streets usually in pairs-without any tangible result. We did, however, rather anticipate a great commercial invention. To our clumsy regulation boots, we nailed strips of rubber, usually bits of old bicycle tires, and so ensured some measure of silence when walking.

Wensley also agreed with commonly held theories that the police were never sure of their suspects, he commenting "Officially, only five (with a possible sixth) murders were attributed to Jack the Ripper."

Police appointments
Preceded by Norman Kendal; 1918–1919	Chief Constable (CID), Metropolitan Police; 1924–1929	Succeeded by John Ashley
