= Visit to Ireland Medal 1900 =

British medal

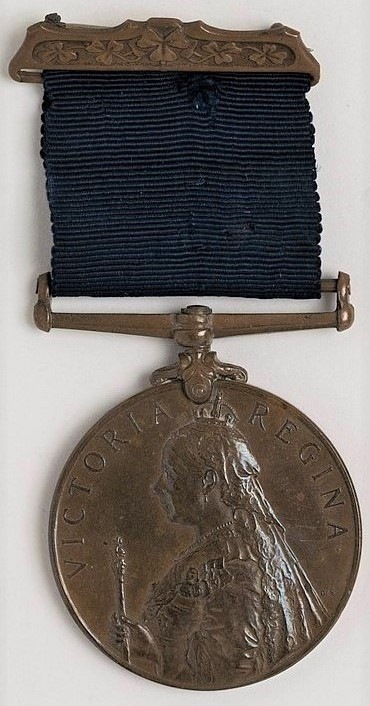
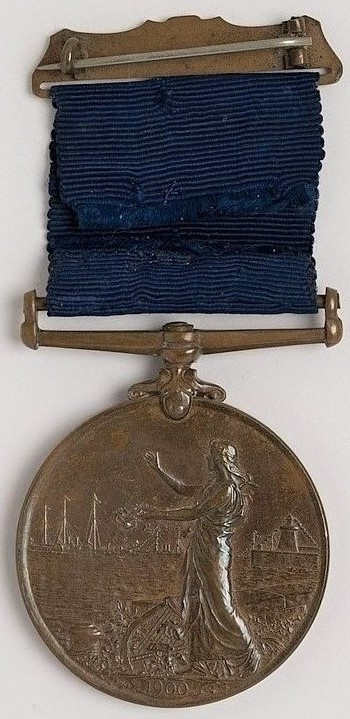
- Obverse and reverse of the medal
- Awarded for: Police duty during the Royal visit
- Presented by: the United Kingdom

Highlights
- Total: 2,285 medals
- Ribbon bar
- Related: Visit to Ireland Medals: Visit to Ireland Medal 1903; Visit to Ireland Medal 1911; Jubilee Medal: Queen Victoria Police Jubilee Medal

Queen Victoria's Commemoration Medal 1900 (Ireland), more commonly referred to as the Visit to Ireland Medal 1900, was awarded to those members of the Irish Police Forces on duty at Queen Victoria’s various engagements during her visit to Ireland in 1900.

Film of the Queen's Dublin visit

Queen Victoria made a formal visit to Dublin between 3 and 27 April 1900. During this time she drove in state through the decorated streets of the city and carried out a number of official engagements. These included a celebration in Phoenix Park attended by 30,000 school children from across Ireland, and a review of troops from the Curragh garrison.

== Criteria ==
Following the example of the Queen Victoria Police Jubilee Medal, awarded for the Golden (1887) and Diamond (1897) Jubilees, a medal was sanctioned for award to those members of the Royal Irish Constabulary and the Dublin Metropolitan Police who were on duty at engagements during Queen's visit. Additionally, members of the Civil Service Staffs of both Police Forces who were on duty at Dublin Castle during the visit received the medal.
A total of 2,285 medals were awarded.

== Description ==
The medal is bronze for all ranks, 1.4 inches (36 mm) in diameter and has a plain straight ribbon bar.

- Obverse: The crowned and veiled half-length effigy of the Queen, facing left, with the inscription ‘VICTORIA REGINA’. The designer was Sir Joseph Boehm.
- Reverse: The figure of Hibernia against the backdrop of Kingstown Harbour. She is opening her arms in welcome to the Royal Yacht entering the harbour. Below is the date ‘1900’. The designer was G. W. de Saulles.
- Ribbon: Plain dark blue, 1.25 inches (32 mm) wide, the same as for the Police Jubilee Medals.
- The ribbon was suspended from an ornamental brooch bar bearing five shamrocks.
- The recipient's name and police rank were engraved on the edge of the medal.
- The medal was worn in date order with Coronation and Jubilee medals.

It was struck at the Royal Mint. Although described as 'bronze', it is in fact made of the zinc-copper alloy tombac.
