= York Crown Court =

Court building in York, England

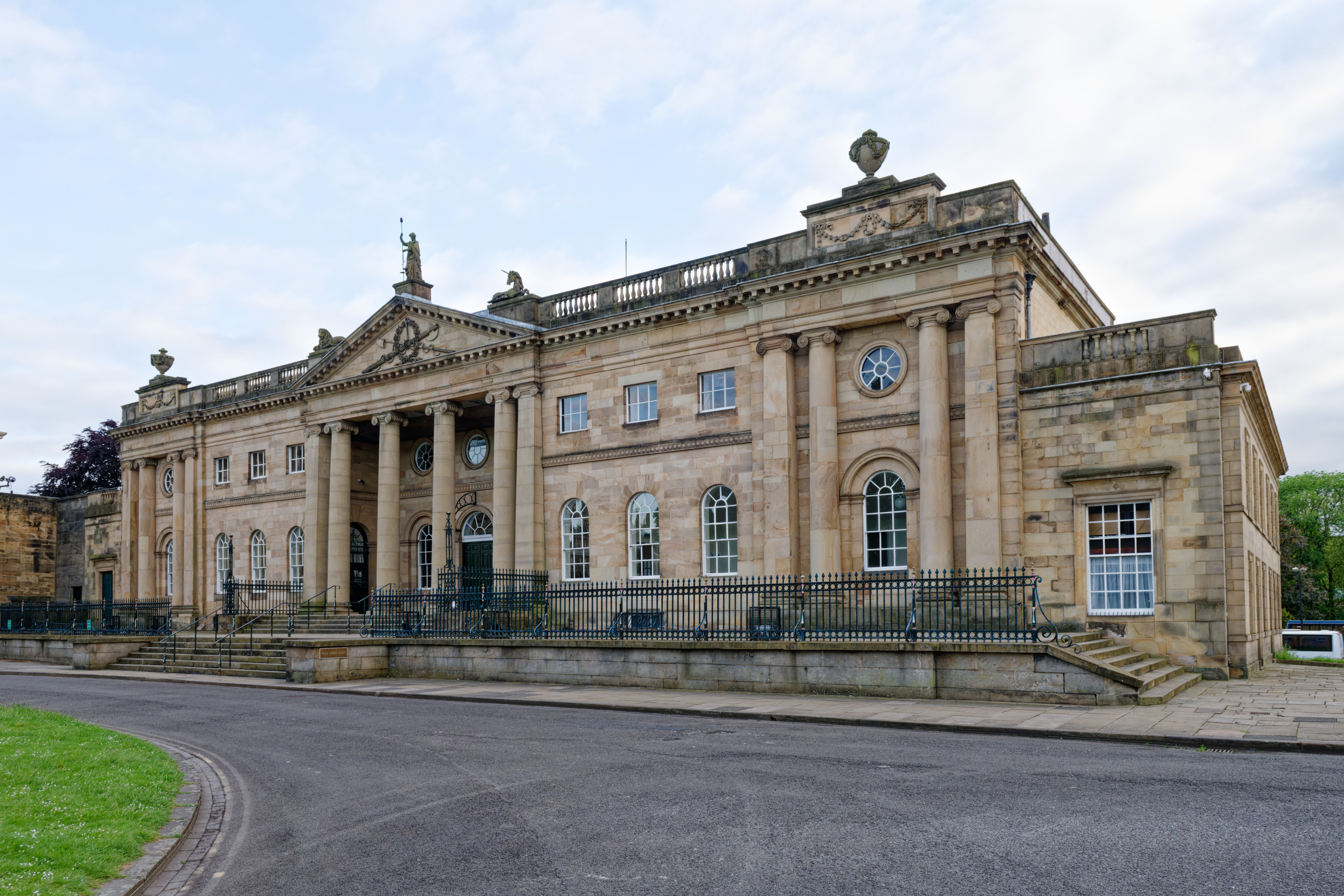
- The court in 2024

- Location within York City Centre

General information
- Status: Crown Court
- Type: Court of assize (former)
- Architectural style: Neoclassical
- Location: York Castle, York, England
- Coordinates: 53.9550°N 1.0795°W
- Year built: 1773–1777
- Renovated: 1818–1821 (altered and added) c. 1835 (added and remodelled); 1870 and 1937 (extended); 1991 (restored)

Design and construction
- Architect: John Carr
- Designations

Listed Building – Grade I
- Official name: Crown Court and railings attached to front
- Designated: 14 June 1954
- Reference no.: 1259328

York Crown Court is a Crown Court venue which deals with criminal cases at York Castle in York, England. It is a Grade I listed building.

== History ==
Originally the assizes for the City of York were held in York Guildhall in St Martins Courtyard, Coney Street. However, judicial matters moved to York Castle when a Grand Jury House was built there in 1668 and supplemented by a Sessions House of 1675. However, by the mid-18th century, the Grand Jury House had become dilapidated and it was decided to demolish it and to erect a new building on the same site.

The new building was commissioned to serve as the assizes courts for the City of York. It was designed by John Carr in the neoclassical style, built in ashlar stone and was completed in 1777. The design involved a symmetrical main frontage of 13 bays, with single-storey end bays which were slightly recessed: it faced onto the castle courtyard, which was grassed over at that time to form a circle, which became known as the "Eye of the Ridings". The central section featured a tetrastyle portico in antis formed by full-height Ionic columns supporting an entablature and a modillioned pediment. The wings of four bays each were fenestrated by round headed sash windows on the ground floor and by small square windows on the first floor. The outer bays of the wings also featured full-height Ionic columns in antis supporting an entablature. Internally, the building was laid out to accommodate two large courtrooms, one to the left and one to the right.

Notable cases in the 19th century included the trial and conviction, in November 1882, of Mary Fitzpatrick for the murder of a glass blower, James Richardson. Following the implementation of the Courts Act 1971, the former assizes courthouse was re-designated York Crown Court, and an extensive programme of refurbishment was completed in 1991.

In 2010, the court was the venue for the trial and conviction of the footballers Craig Nelthorpe and Michael Rankine for affray following a disturbance in the city centre. A climactic scene for the television series Death Comes to Pemberley was filmed on a purpose-built scaffold outside the building in 2013.

== See also ==
- Grade I listed buildings in the City of York
- Listed buildings in York (within the city walls, southern part)
