= Milsom and Fowler =

English murderers

Albert Milsome and Henry Fowler murdered Henry Smith, a 79-year–old, wealthy, retired engineer, on 14 February 1896, at his house in Muswell Hill, London.

The story of the murder of Mr. Smith has entered English criminal history as one of the classic "cut-throat" cases involving a pair of killers. A "cut-throat" case is one where the killers each put forth a defence that the other one was guilty, and in doing this they only convince the jury that both parties are equally guilty of the killing. Another example of such a case is that of Frederick Guy Browne and William Kennedy for the murder of Police Constable George Gutteridge in 1928.

Muswell Hill was a wealthy neighbourhood in North London. In 1896 the elderly Smith lived there in a large house called Muswell Lodge. Smith was somewhat reclusive, and rumour had it he was a wealthy miser keeping large sums of money in the house. He lived alone (though he had a gardener in the daytime), and apparently pegged his safety on some trap-guns set up on the grounds; unfortunately, he did not have any secondary level of protection.

Smith's body was discovered on the morning of 14 February, a few hours after his murder, by his gardener, Charles Webber, who alerted Smith's neighbours, called in a local doctor (Ridley Webster, M.D.), and notified the police. They entered the house and found that Smith had been bound with shreds of blankets and had sustained several head wounds. Two pocket knives and a toy lantern were found next to the body. Smith's safe had been cracked and his bedroom torn apart. The day before the murder two men had been seen near the house. For weeks the police tried to find the killers, using the toy lantern as the best clue they had. Unfortunately hundreds were in existence, so it was a clue that might never be traced. Instead, a Detective named William Burrell was aware of a burglar named Albert Milsome who had disappeared from his neighbourhood. Milsome had recently been seen in the company of one Henry Fowler. Burrell was aware of the younger brother-in-law of Milsome reportedly having a toy lantern, but understood he could not question him or other members of the family about it without tipping them off about its significance. A trap was set at a nearby candy store, where the lantern was set up. The trap succeeded when Milsome's brother-in-law, Henry Miller, identified the lantern as his own.

Now that they were aware that it was Milsome whom they wanted, and that Fowler was missing as well, the police started a manhunt. It eventually turned out that the men were together in a small travelling waxworks that journeyed to fairs around the country, with Fowler acting as the strong man in the circus. A police raid captured both men at Bath. Milsom gave up meekly, but Fowler fought like a tiger and had to be clubbed into submission.

Fowler denied knowing anything about the murder, but Milsome soon cracked under the strain and confessed to robbing Smith, though he said his partner had done the killing. Their trial was held in the Old Bailey in front of Mr. Justice Sir Henry Hawkins. The evidence was basically streamlined because of Milsom's confession, although Fowler kept denying its truth. Fowler was aware of the great damage Milson had done. During a break in the trial, Fowler suddenly jumped up in the dock, and started throttling him. A number of policemen interfered and pulled Fowler off the cowering Milsom.

As it turned out the jury believed Milsome in part - the evidence had shown two knives near the dead Smith, and that suggested the two burglars had jointly committed the tying up and killing of the man. Milsom collapsed when he heard the guilty verdict against him. Fowler just laughed at the failure of Milsom's scheme, and mimicked his partner's protesting of the verdict. When asked if they had anything further to say, Fowler told the court that there were two miscarriages of justice for which he was responsible, naming two recent convictions of two burglars for whose crimes Fowler claimed responsibility. He asked the court to keep these in mind for reviewing those two sentences. As it turned out, Fowler was lying - the evidence against the two burglars was stronger than Fowler thought, and they (the two burglars) were friends of his for whom he was trying to do a favour.

The authorities were afraid that when Milsome and Fowler were going to be hanged Fowler might attack Milsome again. It was decided to hang the two men with a third one between them. A recent double murder had been committed in the Whitechapel section of London of a pawnbroker named John Goodman Levy and his housekeeper, Mrs. Sarah Gale by a burglar named William Seaman. Seaman was cornered while still in Levy's home on the roof. He was subdued in a violent fight by future Chief Constable of Scotland Yard, Frederick Porter Wensley. Seaman too was sentenced to death, and he was put between Milsome and Fowler on the gallows built at Newgate Prison on 9 June 1896. Actually, despite fears by the executioner John Billington Fowler did not make a scene. He came out onto the scaffold after Milsome and Seaman were set up, asked if Milsome was there, and was satisfied to see he was. Seaman, until then unaware of why he was being placed as he was between the Muswell Hill murderers, said, "Well this is the first time in my life I've ever been a bloody peacemaker." Shortly afterwards all three men were hanged.

Usually this is the end of the anecdote about the triple execution of 9 June 1896. There is a little more involved in it. At one point there was a chance that there would have been a quadruple hanging because Amelia Dyer the notorious baby farmer, was supposed to be hanged with them, but it was decided that Mrs. Dyer should be hanged the following day. She was taken out of the prison and taken for a police wagon ride until after the three men were executed. Also at least one source adds to the anecdote about Seaman's final words on the scaffold. Edward Abinger the barrister best recalled for his defence of Steinie Morrison in 1910, wrote an autobiography. In it he reveals that a moment after Seaman made his comment, Fowler signaled he wanted to say something. It is possible that Seaman's comment struck Fowler as funny, and he said (according to Abinger), "Well this is the first time in my life I've ever been a bloody penitent." But Abinger is the only person who ever seems to have noted that comment.

== General references ==
- Dilnot, George (1925). "VII: The Murder at Muswell Lodge". Celebrated Crimes. pp. 104–122.
- Dilnot, George (1929). "XIII: The Toy Lantern". Triumphs of Detection. Pall Mall, London: Geoffrey Bles. pp. 163–175.
- Speer, W.H. (1929). The Secret History of Crimes.
- Laurence, John (1930). A History of Capital Punishment. p. 128. (Description of the execution.)
- Wensley, Frederick Porter (1930–31). "III: William Seaman—Murderer". Forty Years of Scotland Yard. Garden City, N.Y., Doubleday, Doran & Co. pp. 21–31. (Regarding the third man hanged between Milsom and Fowler - the execution is described on p. 30-31.)
- Lambton, Arthur (1931). Echoes of Causes Célèbres.
- Twyman, H.W. (1931). The Best Laid Schemes...
- Hicks, Seymour (1939). Not Guilty, M'Lord.
- Wallace & others, Edgar (1947). The Strangest Clue on Record" by Max Pemberton. pp. 168–183.
- Piper, Leonard (1991). Murder By Gaslight. Smithmark Publishers, Incorporated. pp. 53–71: "The Broken Lantern". ISBN 9780831761547.
- Gaute, J.H.H.; Odell, Robin (1996). The New Murderer's Who's Who. Harrap Books.
