= Queen Victoria Diamond Jubilee Medal =

British royal jubilee medal

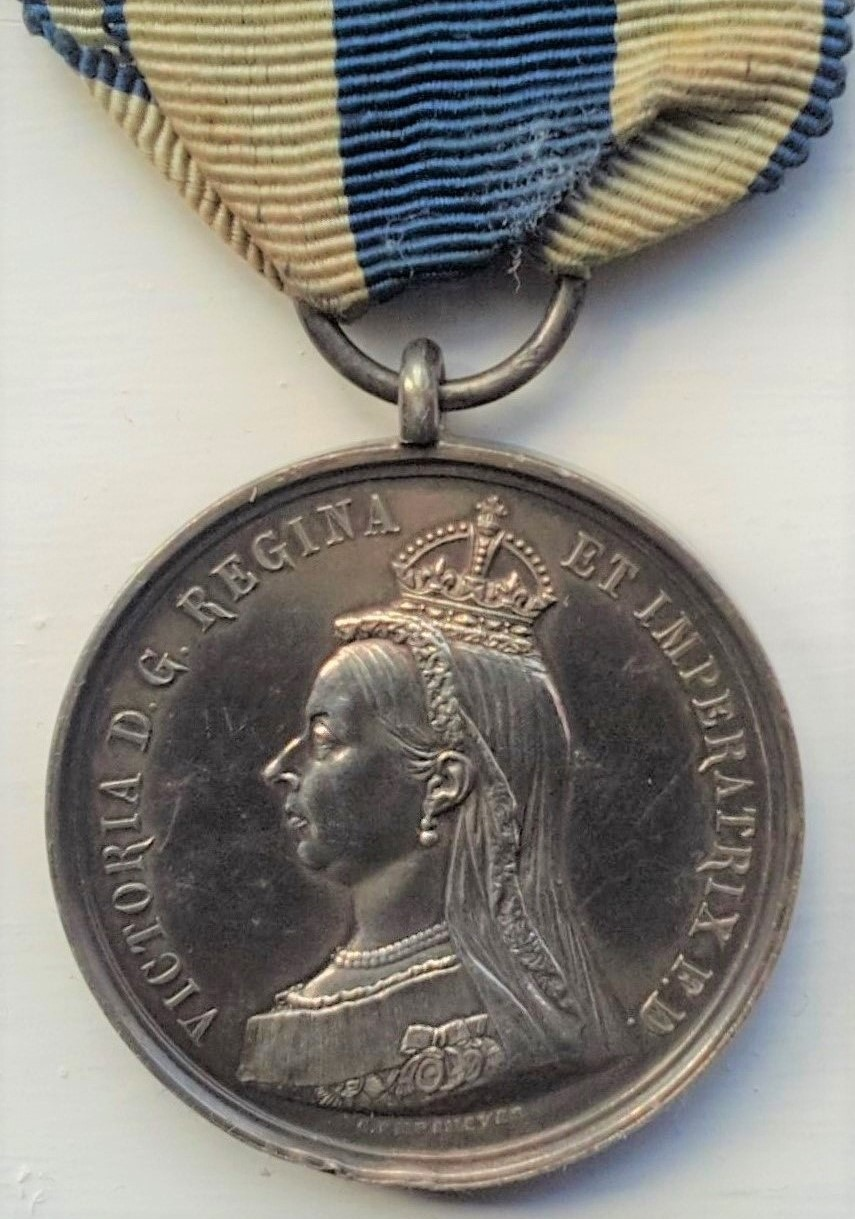
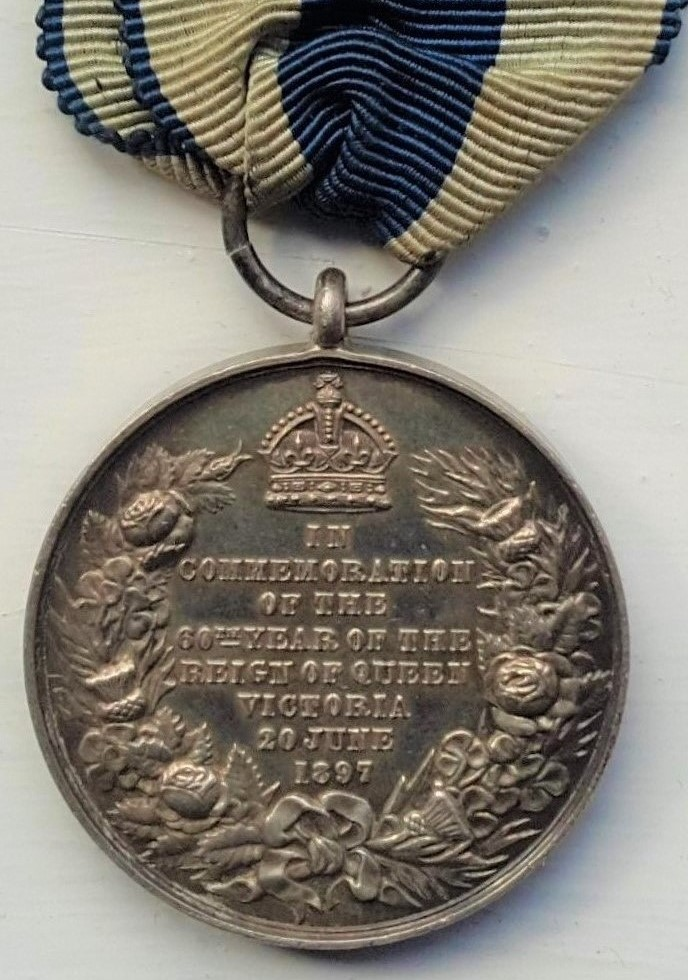
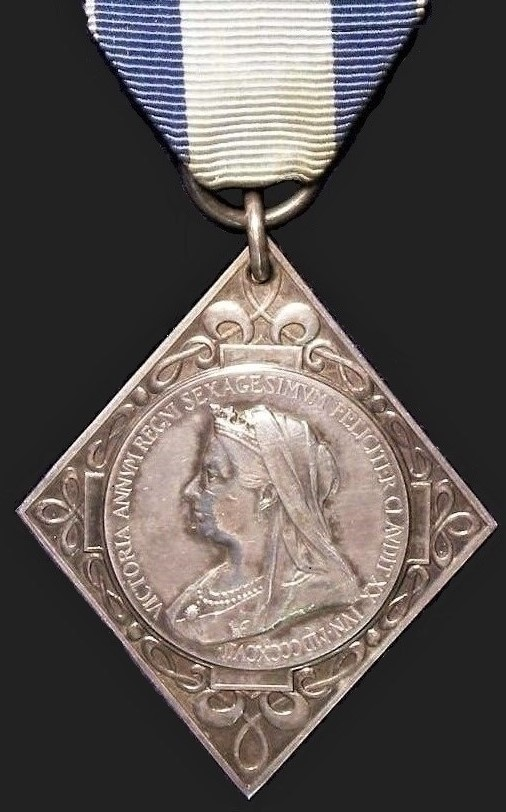
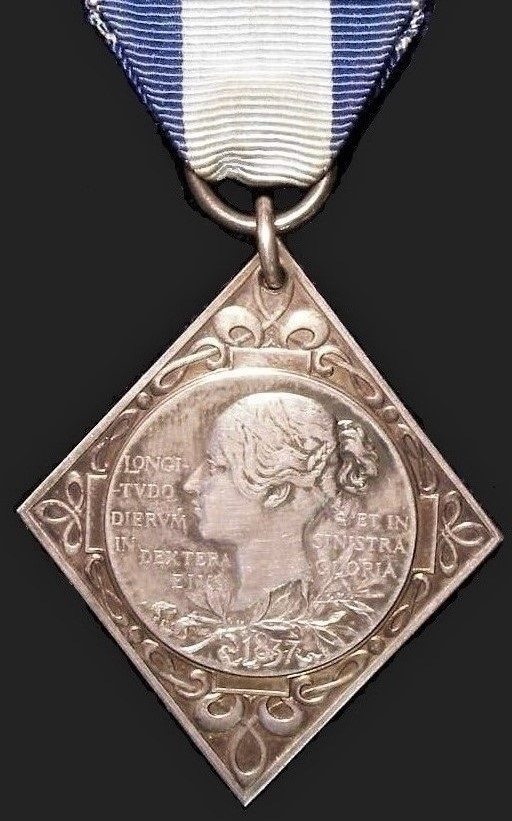
- Diamond Jubilee Medal in silver Medal awarded to Mayors and Provosts in silver
- Awarded for: Participation in Queen Victoria's diamond jubilee
- Description: Awarded in gold, silver and bronze
- Presented by: United Kingdom
- Eligibility: Members of the Royal Family, Royal Household, officials, colonial and foreign representatives. Members of the naval, military and colonial contingents attending the Jubilee.
- Established: 1897
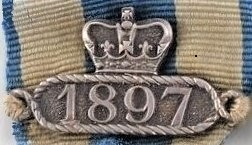
- 1897 clasp for the Golden Jubilee Medal in silver Diamond Jubilee Medal ribbon Ribbon of medal to Mayors and Provosts
- Related: Queen Victoria Golden Jubilee Medal; Queen Victoria Police Jubilee Medal

The Diamond Jubilee Medal was instituted in 1897 by royal warrant as a British decoration. The medal was awarded to members of the royal family and the court, guests and dignitaries present at the celebrations of the Diamond Jubilee of Queen Victoria and to selected soldiers and sailors who formed the jubilee parade in London.

The medal followed the Golden Jubilee Medal, issued ten years previously, both in terms of design and award criteria, with those qualifying for both medals receiving a ribbon clasp in lieu of a second medal.

== Issue ==
The medal was awarded to those involved in the official celebrations of Queen Victoria's diamond jubilee, including members of the Royal Family, Royal Household and government officials, as well as Envoys, Foreign Ambassadors and Colonial Prime Ministers. Military recipients included selected officers, sailors and soldiers of the Royal Navy and Army, and the Indian and colonial contingents, that participated in jubilee activities, including the London procession in which the Queen took part.

The medal was worn on the left breast with other coronation and jubilee medals. These were worn before campaign medals until November 1918, after which the order of wear was changed, with such commemorative medals now worn after campaign medals and before long service awards. Ladies could wear the medal near their left shoulder with the ribbon tied in the form of a bow.

== Different versions ==
Three types of medal were awarded:

- Queen Victoria's Diamond Jubilee Medal. Awarded in gold to members of the Royal Family (73 awarded), silver to officers and those of similar status (3,040 awarded), and bronze to selected other ranks who took part in the jubilee parade (890 awarded).
- A special diamond shaped medal for mayors and provosts, presented in gold to lord mayors and lord provosts (14 awarded) and silver to mayors and provosts (512 awarded) from across the United Kingdom.
- A Police Diamond Jubilee Medal of a different design was awarded to those on duty during the jubilee celebrations,(10,086 awarded). See separate article.

Other members of the Commonwealth struck their own versions of the medal, albeit not officially sanctioned for wear. The Government of Ceylon struck medals in 14-carat gold and silver, awarded to senior members of government and local officials.

== Description ==
The Diamond Jubilee Medal followed the design of Golden Jubilee Medal. It measures 30 millimetres (1.2 in) in diameter. On the obverse Queen Victoria is depicted crowned and wearing a veil which falls over the back of the head and neck, with the text VICTORIA D.G. REGINA ET IMPERATRIX F.D.. The reverse bears the words IN COMMEMORATION OF THE 60TH YEAR OF THE REIGN OF QUEEN VICTORIA · 20 JUNE 1897 within a garland of roses, shamrock and thistles. The obverse bust of Queen Victoria was designed by Sir Joseph Edgar Boehm, and the reverse wreath by Clemens Emptmayer. The ribbon is garter blue with wide white stripes towards each edge.

Holders of the 1887 medal who again qualified were awarded a bar inscribed '1897' surmounted by a crown, to be attached to the ribbon of the existing medal.

The medal for mayors and provosts is a lozenge, 40 by 48 millimetres (1.6 in × 1.9 in), bearing a trefoil pattern, with a circular centre that depicts the portrait of the older Queen on the obverse, with the young Queen on the reverse. The ribbon follows that of the standard medal, with the colours reversed.

Both the standard jubilee medal and the mayors and provosts version were awarded unnamed.
