= Henry Hawkins, 1st Baron Brampton =

British judge (1817–1907)

The Right Honourable The Lord Brampton PC
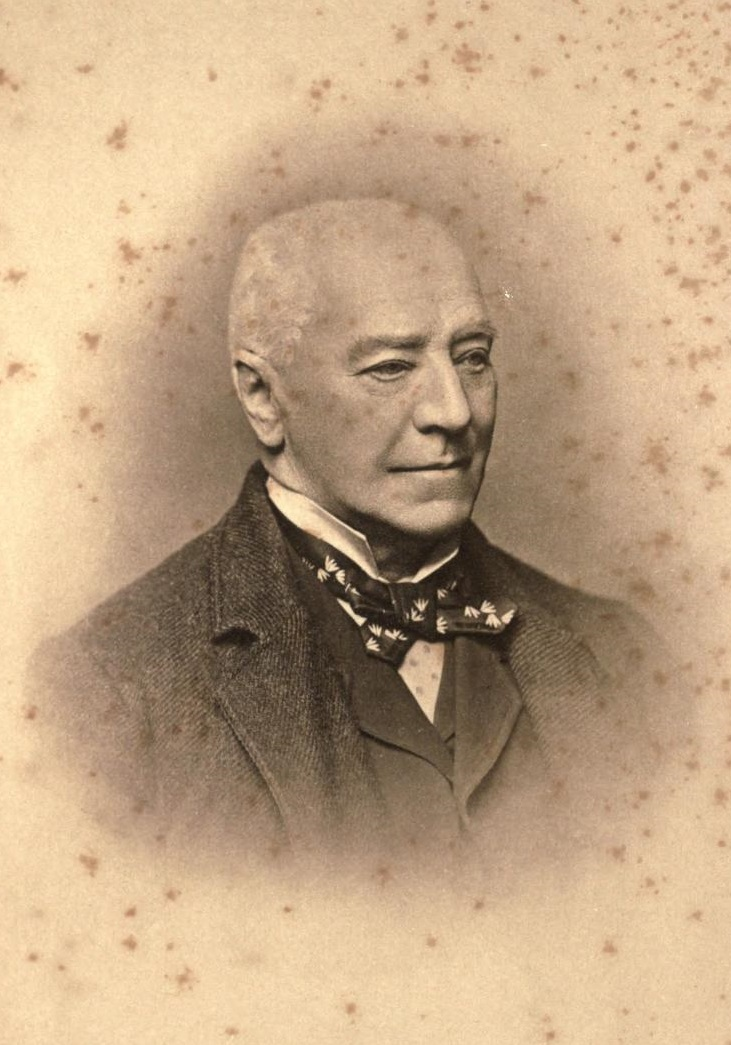
- Lord Brampton.

Personal details
- Born: 14 September 1817 Hitchin, Hertfordshire
- Died: 6 October 1907 (aged 90) Tilney Street, Park Lane, London
- Spouse(s): (1) Hanna Casey (d. 1886) (2) Jane Louisa Reynolds (d. 1907)

Henry Hawkins, 1st Baron Brampton, PC (14 September 1817 – 6 October 1907), known as Sir Henry Hawkins between 1876 and 1899, was an English judge. He served as a Judge of the High Court of Justice between 1876 and 1898. R. F. V. Heuston described him as "probably the worst judge on the English Bench in the nineteenth century."

== Background and education ==
Born at Hitchin, Hertfordshire, Hawkins was the son of John Hawkins, a solicitor, and Susanna, daughter of Theed Pearse. Through his father he was early familiarised with legal principles. He was educated at Bedford School, and was called to the Bar, Middle Temple, in 1843.

== Legal career 1843–1876 ==
Hawkins at once joined the old home circuit, and after enjoying a lucrative practice as a junior, was made Queen's Counsel in 1859. His name is identified with many of the famous trials of the reign of Queen Victoria. He was engaged in the Simon Bernard case, in that of Roupell v. Waite, and in the Overend-Gurney prosecutions. The two causes célèbres, however, in which Hawkins attained his highest legal distinction were the Tichborne trials and the great will case of Sugden v. Lord St. Leonards, relating to the lost will of Edward Sugden, 1st Baron St Leonards. In both of these he won. He had a lucrative business in references and arbitrations, and acted for the royal commissioners in the purchase of the site for the new law courts. Election petitions also formed another branch of his extensive practice.

== Judicial career 1876–1898 ==
Hawkins was raised to the bench in 1876, and was assigned to the then exchequer division of the High Court of Justice, not as Baron of the Exchequer (an appellation which was being abolished by the Judicature Act), but with the title of Sir Henry Hawkins. His knowledge of the criminal law was extensive and intimate and he got a reputation as a hanging judge. Hawkins would be the judge at a large number of the most famous English criminal trials of his day. His first major case was the 1877 trial of Louis Staunton, his brother Patrick, and two others for the murder of Louis' wife Harriet and her baby by starvation. A question regarding whether he was too favourable to the prosecution's case (coupled with evidence of meningitis rather than starvation being the cause of death) led to a public campaign orchestrated by the novelist Charles Reade. The decision reduced the sentences of the three convicted defendants (for the Staunton brothers prison sentences rather than death sentences). Patrick Staunton's barrister, Edward Clarke, never forgave Hawkins, whom he considered a wicked judge.

Other trials that Hawkins presided over included Charles Peace for maliciously wounding a police constable in October 1878 (the trial was the following month), Dr George Henry Lamson for the poisoning of his brother-in-law Percy Johns at Wimbledon in December 1881 (the trial was in April 1882); the trial of Mary Fitzpatrick for murder in November 1882; the Earl of Euston's 1889 libel case against newspaper editor Ernest Parke – a notorious miscarriage of justice that was part of the Cleveland Street scandal; the trial of Dr Thomas Neill Cream for the Lambeth/Stepney poisonings of prostitutes from December 1891 to April 1892 (the trial was in November 1892); and the trial of Albert Milsom and Henry Fowler for the Muswell Hill murder in February 1896 (the trial was in May 1896). In 1898 he retired from the bench. The following year he was raised to the peerage as Baron Brampton, of Brampton in the County of Huntingdon, and sworn of the Privy Council. He frequently took part in determining House of Lords appeals.

A controversial judge, Hawkins was not given a valedictory on his retirement, for fear that he would be abused in open court, Sir Edward Clarke having threatened to appear in order to condemn him.

== Personal life ==
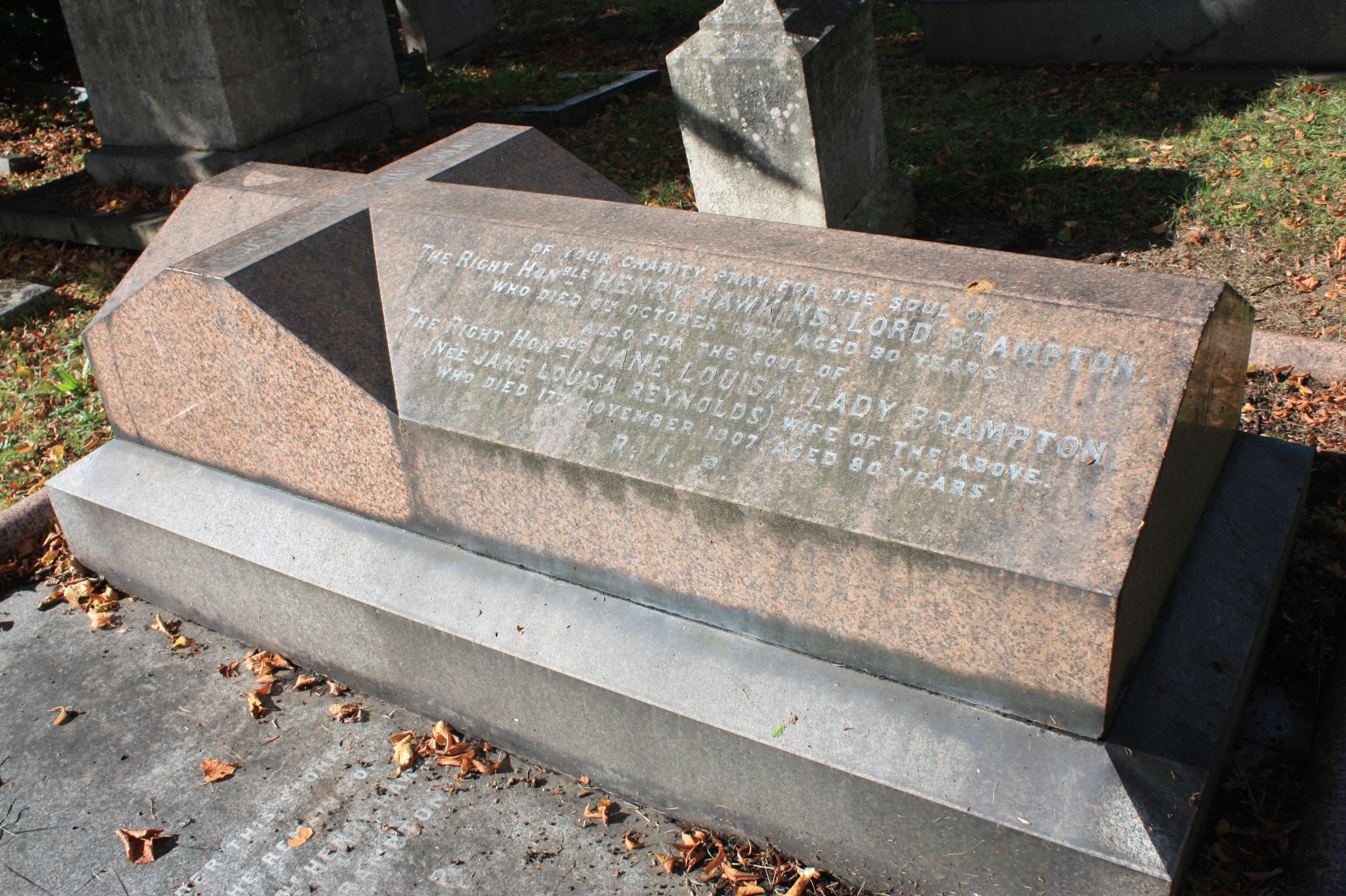
The grave of Henry Hawkins, Lord Brampton, Kensal Green Cemetery.

Lord Brampton was twice married. He married firstly Hannah Theresa Casey (born Hannah Helwig in St Ives, Huntingdonshire in 1815. She first married Thomas Lawrence in 1836) After her death on 10 September 1886 he married secondly Jane Louisa, daughter of Henry Francis Reynolds, in 1887. He held for many years the office of counsel to the Jockey Club, and as an active member of that body found relaxation from his legal and judicial duties at the leading race meetings, and was considered a capable judge of horses. In 1898 he converted to Catholicism, and in 1903 he presented, in conjunction with Lady Brampton (his second wife), the chapel of Sts. Augustine and Gregory to the Roman Catholic Westminster Cathedral, which was consecrated in that year. In 1904 he published his Reminiscences edited by Richard Harris, K.C., published by Edward Arnold, London.

Lord Brampton died at Tilney Street, Park Lane, London, on 6 October 1907, aged 90; the barony then became extinct. He left a fortune of £141,000. Lady Brampton (Jane Louisa Reynolds) died in 17 November the same year. They are buried together in Kensal Green Cemetery in London.

Peerage of the United Kingdom
New creation	Baron Brampton; 1899–1907	Extinct
