= King Edward VII Police Coronation Medal =

King Edward VII’s Police Coronation Medal
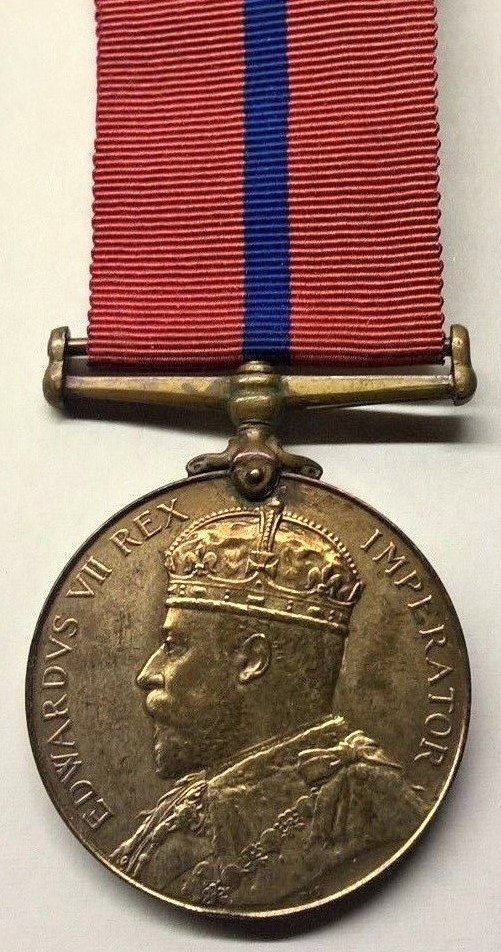
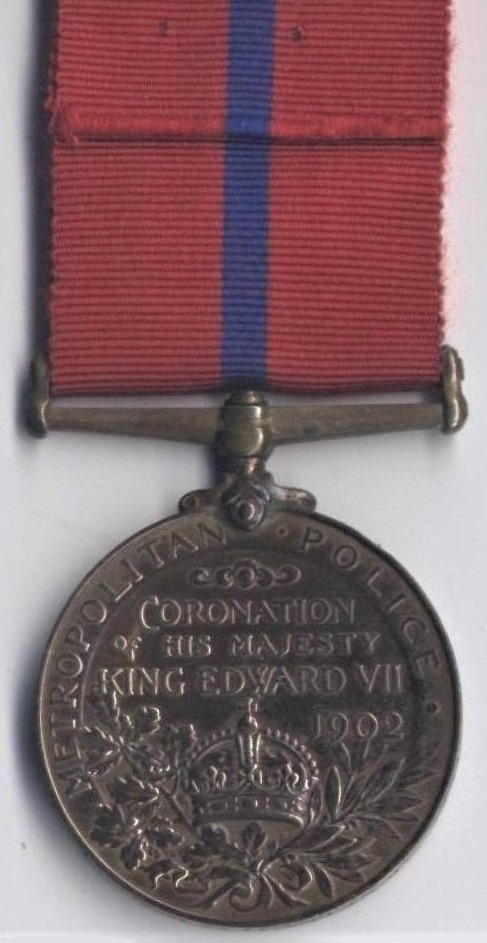
- Obverse and reverse: Metropolitan Police version.
- Awarded for: Police and members of ancillary services on duty in London on Coronation day.
- Presented by: United Kingdom
- Established: 1902

Highlights
- Total: 57 silver & 19,885 bronze medals
- Ribbon: King Edward VII Police Coronation Medal Ribbon: King Edward VII Police Medal (Scotland)
- Related: King Edward VII Coronation Medal; Visit to Ireland Medal 1903

The Police Coronation Medal was sanctioned in 1902 as an award to policeman, firemen and members of ambulance units on duty during the official celebrations of the Coronation of King Edward VII and Queen Alexandra on 9 August 1902.

== Award ==
The medal continued the practice of awarding a special medal to police and support services on duty during major royal celebrations established with Queen Victoria's Golden and Diamond Jubilee Police Medals. It was presented in silver or bronze, according to rank, with the silver medal awarded to superintendents and above in the police and fire brigade. A total of 67 silver and 19,885 bronze medals were awarded.
The reverse indicates the service in which the recipient served, there being five types:
Metropolitan Police: 51 silver, 16,709 bronze medals.
City of London Police: 5 silver, 1,060 bronze medals.
London County Council Metropolitan Fire Brigade: 10 silver and 1,000 bronze medals.
St John Ambulance Brigade: 912 bronze medals.
Police Ambulance Service: 1 silver, 204 bronze medals.

== Description ==
The medal, 1.4 inches (36 mm) in diameter, was designed by George William de Saulles.

- Obverse: A crowned and robed left-facing bust of King Edward VII with the inscription EDWARDVS VII REX IMPERATOR:.
- Reverse: The Imperial Crown resting on sprigs of oak and laurel below the inscription CORONATION OF HIS MAJESTY KING EDWARD VII 1902 with the name of the service in which the recipient served above.
- Ribbon: 1.25 inches (32 mm) wide. Red with a narrow central blue stripe.
- The recipient's rank, name and division were engraved on the edge of the medal.
- The medal was worn in date order with other Royal commemorative medals. These were worn before campaign medals until November 1918, after which the order of wear was changed, with such medals now worn after campaign medals and before long service awards.

== Notable recipients ==
Recipients of the medal in silver include:

- Colonel Sir Edward Bradford, Commissioner of the Metropolitan Police.
- Alexander Bruce, Assistant Commissioner of the Metropolitan Police.
- Edward Henry, Assistant Commissioner of the Metropolitan Police (Crime)
- Sir Charles Howard, Assistant Commissioner of the Metropolitan Police.
- William Nott-Bower, Commissioner of the City of London Police.
- Frederick Wodehouse, Assistant Commissioner of the City of London Police.

Recipients of the medal in bronze include:

- Dr Belgrave Ninnis, Deputy Commissioner in charge of the London (Prince of Wales) District, St John Ambulance Brigade.
- Frederick Wensley, Metropolitan Police detective sergeant, later chief constable of the Scotland Yard Criminal Investigation Department.

== King Edward VII Police Medal (Scotland), 1903 ==
Also called the Visit to Scotland Medal, it was awarded to members of the Scottish Police and ancillary services on duty for the celebrations related to the King's post coronation visit to Scotland in May 1903. The medal is identical to the Police Coronation Medal, except the reverse inscription reads FROM HIS MAJESTY KING EDWARD VII 1903, with SCOTTISH POLICE above. The ribbon is plain red, omitting the central blue stripe of the 1902 medal, and has an ornamental suspension bar decorated with a spray of thistle. A total of 2,957 medals were awarded, all in bronze.
