= Queen Victoria Golden Jubilee Medal =

British royal jubilee medal

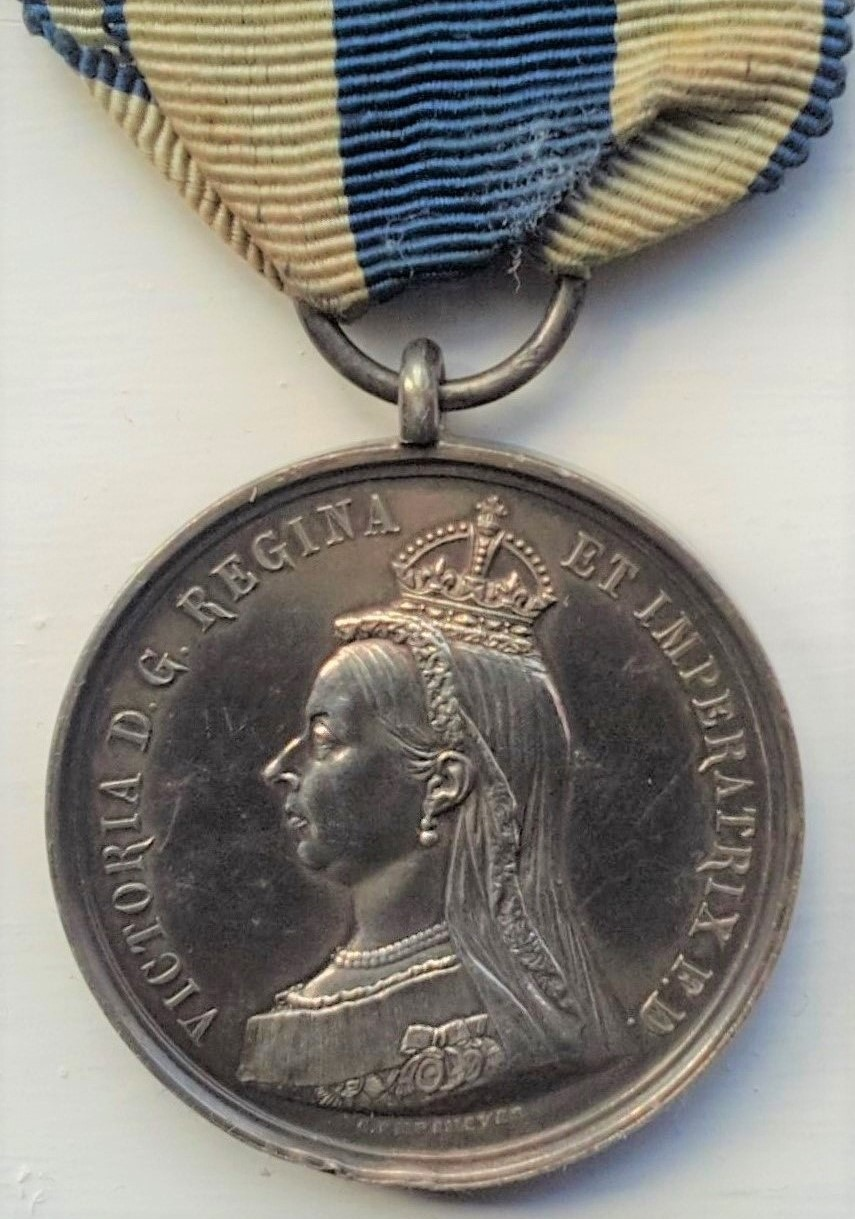
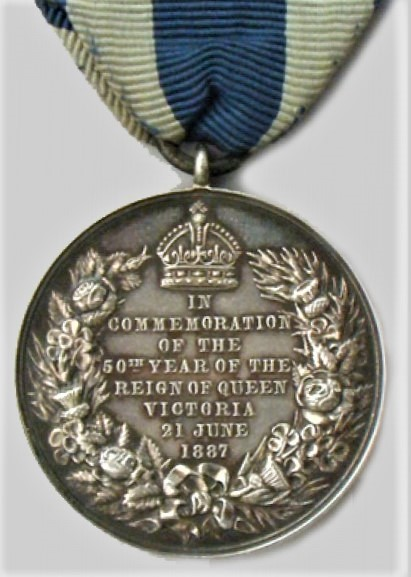
- Golden Jubilee Medal in silver
- Awarded for: Participation in Queen Victoria's golden jubilee
- Description: Awarded in gold, silver and bronze
- Presented by: Queen Victoria
- Eligibility: Members of the Royal Family, Royal Household, officials, colonial and foreign representatives. Members of the naval, military and colonial contingents attending the Jubilee
- Established: 1887
- Golden Jubilee Medal Ribbon
- Related: Queen Victoria Police Jubilee Medal; Queen Victoria Diamond Jubilee Medal

The Queen Victoria Golden Jubilee Medal was instituted in 1887 by Royal Warrant as a British decoration to be awarded to participants of Queen Victoria's golden jubilee celebrations.

== Issue ==
The medal was struck to celebrate Queen Victoria's golden jubilee, the 50th anniversary of her reign. It was awarded to those involved in the official celebrations, including members of the Royal Family, Royal Household and government officials, as well as Envoys, Foreign Ambassadors and Colonial Prime Ministers. Military recipients included selected officers, sailors and soldiers of the Royal Navy and Army, and the Indian and colonial contingents, that participated in jubilee activities, including the London parade and the Royal Naval Review at Spithead, where the commander of each ship received the medal in silver.

The medal was worn on the left breast, originally after the insignia of orders and before campaign medals. In November 1918 the order of wear changed, with all coronation and jubilee medals now worn after campaign medals and before long service awards. Ladies could wear the medal near their left shoulder with the ribbon tied in the form of a bow.

A Police Golden Jubilee Medal of a different design was awarded to members of the Metropolitan and City of London Police Forces on duty during the jubilee celebrations.

== Description ==
The medal measures 30 millimetres (1.2 in) in diameter and was awarded in gold (to members of the Royal Family), silver (to officers and those of similar status) and in bronze (to selected other ranks and those of similar status). On the obverse, Queen Victoria is depicted crowned and wearing a veil which falls over the back of the head and neck, with the text VICTORIA D.G. REGINA ET IMPERATRIX F.D.. The reverse bears the words IN COMMEMORATION OF THE 50TH YEAR OF THE REIGN OF QUEEN VICTORIA · 21 JUNE 1887 within a garland of roses, shamrock and thistles. The bust of Queen Victoria on obverse was designed by Sir Joseph Edgar Boehm and the reverse wreath designed by Clemens Emptmayer, who was recommended by Boehm. The ribbon is garter blue with wide white stripes towards each edge. The medal was awarded unnamed.

When Queen Victoria's Diamond Jubilee was celebrated 10 years later, holders of the 1887 medal who qualified for the Diamond Jubilee Medal were awarded a bar inscribed '1897' to attach to the ribbon of their existing medal.
