= Visit to Ireland Medal 1903 =

Visit to Ireland Medal, 1903
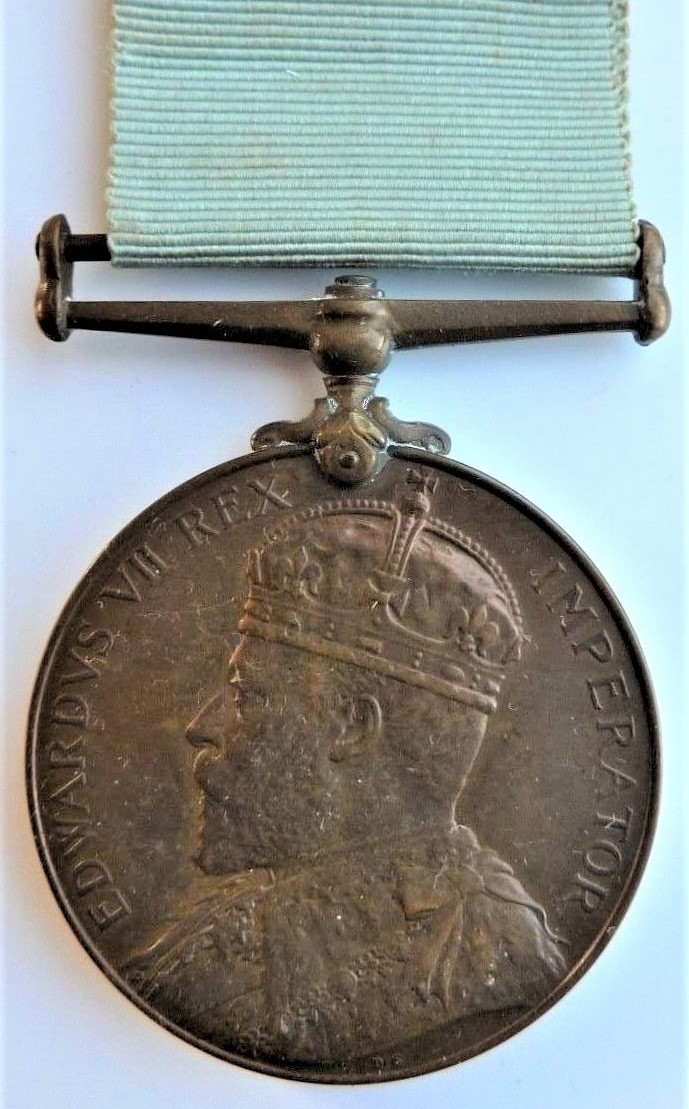
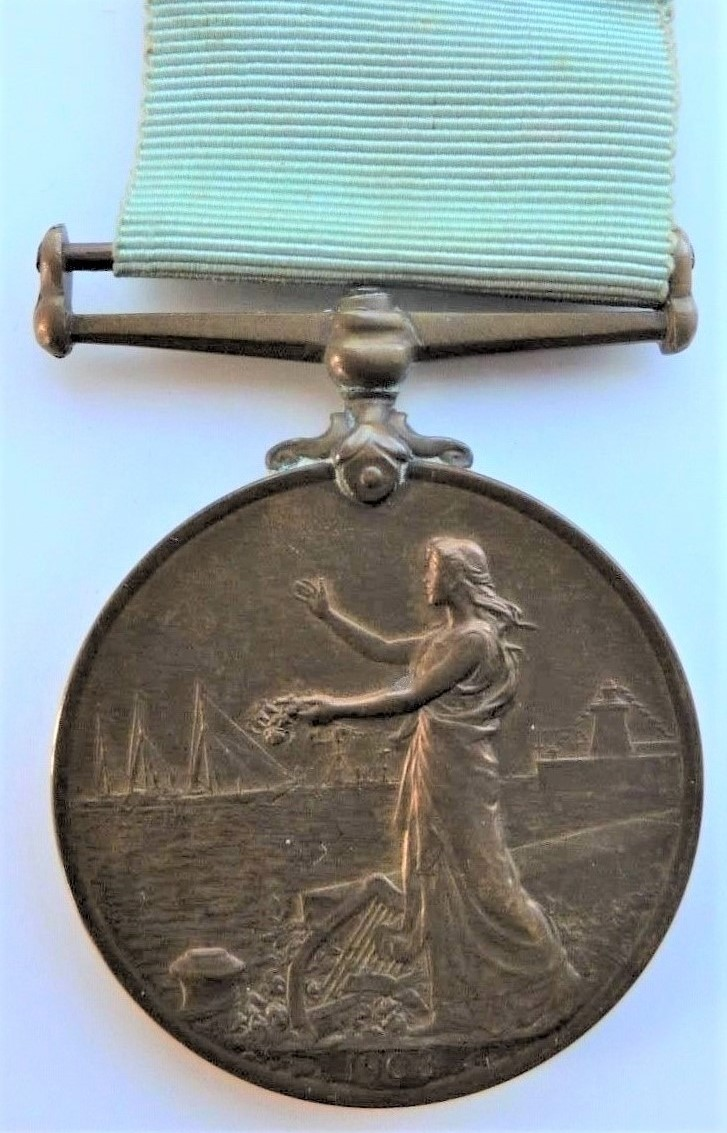
- Obverse and reverse of the medal
- Awarded for: Police duty during the Royal visit
- Presented by: the United Kingdom

Highlights
- Total: 7,756 medals
- Ribbon bar
- Related: Royal Visit Medals: Visit to Ireland Medal 1900; Visit to Scotland Medal 1903; Visit to Ireland Medal 1911; Coronation Medal: Edward VII Police Coronation Medal

King Edward VII’s Visit Commemoration Medal 1903 (Ireland), more commonly referred to as the Visit to Ireland Medal 1903, was awarded to those members of the Irish Police Forces on duty during the various engagements of King Edward VII’s visit to Ireland in 1903. A total of 7,756 medals were awarded.

Edward VII was created Earl of Dublin on 17 January 1850. The King made his first official visit to Ireland in July and August 1903. Arriving at Kingstown, he stayed a week in Dublin, where he drove in state through the decorated streets of the city in an open carriage, received civic and church dignitaries at Dublin Castle, and reviewed the Dublin Garrison in Phoenix Park. He then undertook a Royal Progress of other parts of Ireland, visiting Belfast and Derry, before sailing around the coast in the Royal Yacht, landing in Connemara and Cork. He also toured inland, travelling by motor car.

Following the precedent created by Queen Victoria’s Visit to Ireland Medal 1900, a medal was awarded to those members of the Royal Irish Constabulary and the Dublin Metropolitan Police on duty at the places visited by the King during his visit. Additionally, members of the Civil Service Staffs of both Police Forces who were on duty at Dublin Castle during the visit received the medal. A small number of awards were also made to members of the Belfast Harbour Police, His Majesty's Coastguard and to seven members of the Belfast Fire Brigade on duty at Mount Stewart in County Down during the King's stay between 25–27 July 1903.

Members of the Dublin Metropolitan Police received their medals on 20 January 1904 at a parade in the Upper Yard of Dublin Castle. Due to the dispersed nature of the Royal Irish Constabulary, no similar single presentation took place.

== Description ==
The medal is bronze for all ranks, 1.4 inches (36 mm) in diameter and has a plain straight ribbon bar.

Ornamental brooch bar

- Obverse: A crowned and robed left-facing bust of King Edward VII with the inscription ’EDWARDVS VII REX IMPERATOR’, the same as for the 1902 Police Coronation Medal.
- Reverse: The figure of Hibernia against the backdrop of Kingstown Harbour. She is opening her arms in welcome to the Royal Yacht entering the harbour. Below is the date ‘1903’. The designer was G. W. de Saulles. Apart from the date, the design is identical to the Visit to Ireland Medal 1900.
- Ribbon: Plain pale blue, 1.25 inches (32 mm) wide, the colour of the sash and mantle of the Order of St Patrick.
- The ribbon was suspended from an ornamental brooch bar bearing five shamrocks.
- The recipient's name and police rank were engraved on the edge of the medal.
- The medal was worn in date order with Coronation and Jubilee medals.

Miniature medals also exist with the same design, made by Gurney of London. Diameter 19 mm.
