= King Edward VII Coronation Medal =

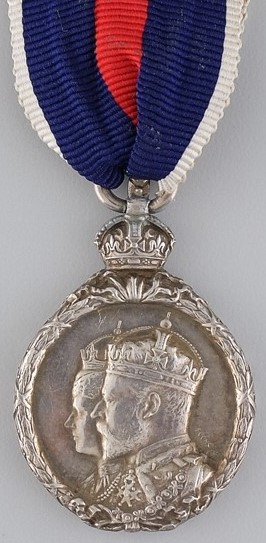
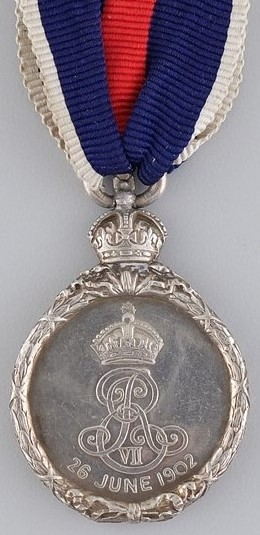
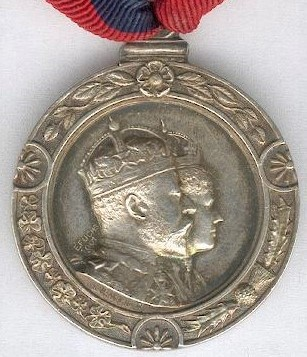
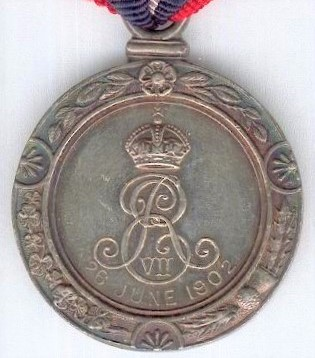
- King Edward VII Coronation Medal in silver Medal awarded to Mayors and Provosts
- Type: Commemorative medal
- Awarded for: Participation in coronation
- Presented by: United Kingdom
- Established: 1902
- Final award: 1903
- King Edward VII Coronation Medal Mayors and Provosts Coronation Medal
- Related: Edward VII Police Coronation Medal

The King Edward VII Coronation Medal was a commemorative medal issued in 1902 to celebrate the coronation of King Edward VII and Queen Alexandra.

== Issue ==
The medal was awarded in silver and bronze. It was issued in silver to members of the royal family, dignitaries, senior government officials and officers of the armed services who were present at the coronation ceremony, performed work in its preparation, or who were involved in the coronation parade. Selected NCOs and other ranks at the coronation parade received the medal in bronze. The bronze medal was also given to one seaman or marine of 'very good' character on each ship at the Spithead Naval review held on 16 August 1902. The two members of the Queen Alexandra's Imperial Military Nursing Service who nursed the King during his pre-coronation illness received bronze medals.

The medal was worn on the left chest from a ribbon with other coronation and jubilee medals. These were worn before campaign medals until November 1918, after which the order of wear was changed, with such commemorative medals now worn after campaign medals and before long service awards. Ladies could wear the medal near their left shoulder with the ribbon tied in the form of a bow.

== Description ==
- Designed by Emil Fuchs.
- It is oval, 30 by 38 millimetres (1.2 in × 1.5 in) and surmounted by a crown.
- The obverse has a profile of King Edward VII and Queen Alexandra, crowned and facing left and surrounded by a wreath that forms the rim of the medal.
- The reverse shows the king's cypher above the date 26 June 1902, surrounded by a wreath in the same form as on the obverse.
- It was awarded unnamed.

Due to the king falling ill with appendicitis, the coronation, planned for 26 June 1902, had to be postponed while the monarch recovered from surgery, and the coronation was actually held on 9 August 1902. This change happened too late to be reflected on the medals, which bear the earlier date.

== Different versions ==
- The medal awarded to royalty, officials, dignitaries and the armed forces, described above, has a ribbon of dark blue with one central red stripe and white edges on either side.
- The special medal, in silver only, awarded to mayors and provosts is circular, but otherwise of a broadly similar design. It has a ribbon of dark blue with red edges and a narrow white central stripe.
- The Police Coronation Medal was a larger circular medal of a different design, awarded in both silver and bronze, suspended from a ribbon of red with a narrow blue central stripe.
