= Visit to Ireland Medal 1911 =

Visit to Ireland Medal, 1911
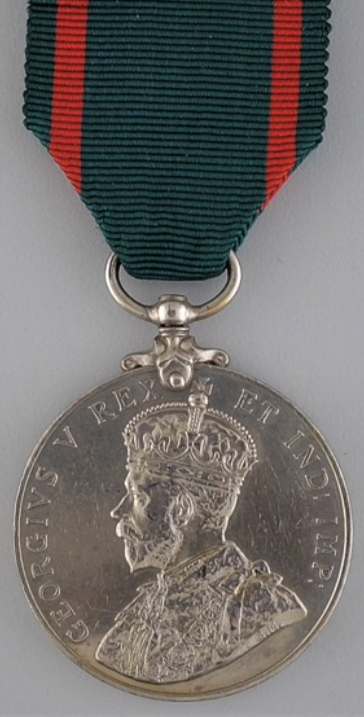
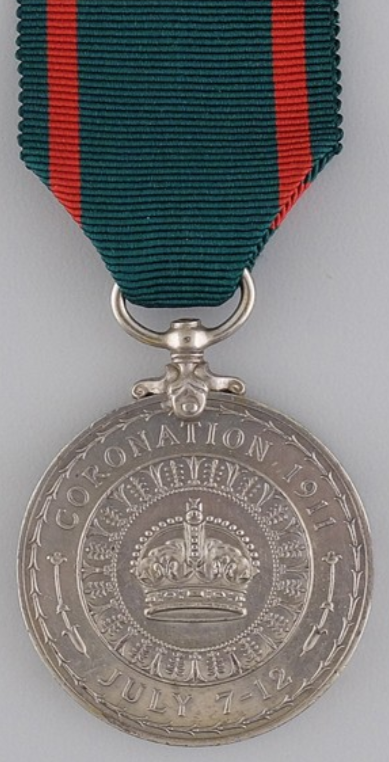
- Obverse and reverse of the medal
- Awarded for: Police duty during the Royal visit
- Presented by: the United Kingdom

Highlights
- Total: 2,477 medals
- Ribbon bar
- Related: Visit to Ireland Medals: Visit to Ireland Medal 1900; Visit to Ireland Medal 1903; Coronation Medal: George V Police Coronation Medal

King George V's Visit Police Commemoration Medal 1911 (Ireland), more commonly referred to as the Visit to Ireland Medal 1911, was awarded to those members of the Irish Police Forces on duty during the various engagements of King George V's visit to Ireland in 1911.

King George V made his coronation year visit to Ireland in July 1911. Staying in Dublin, he drove in state through the city in an open carriage as well as attending a number of official ceremonies to celebrate his recent coronation.

Following the precedent created by Queen Victoria's and Edward VII's Visit to Ireland Medals, a medal was awarded to those members of the Royal Irish Constabulary and the Dublin Metropolitan Police who were on duty at engagements during King George's visit. Additionally, members of the Civil Service Staffs of both Police Forces who were on duty at Dublin Castle during the visit received the medal, as did some members of the Dublin St Johns Ambulance Brigade, the Kingstown Harbour Police and the local Parks Constabularies.

A total of 2,477 medals were awarded.

Prior to the Irish visit, a delegation of 585 members of the Royal Irish Constabulary had travelled to London and were on duty at King George V's coronation in June 1911 and received the Police Coronation Medal with the "Royal Irish Constabulary" reverse.

== Description ==
The medal is silver for all ranks, 1.4 inches (36 mm) in diameter with a ring suspension for the ribbon. It follows the design of the King George V Police Coronation Medal, save for the inscription on the reverse and the ribbon.

- Obverse: A crowned left-facing bust of King George V with the inscription GEORGIVS V REX ET IND: IMP.
- Reverse: The Imperial Crown with an ornate surround, with the inscription ‘CORONATION 1911’ above and the dates of the visit ‘JULY 7–12’ below.
- Ribbon: Dark green with a narrow red stripe towards each edge, reflecting the colours of the Royal Irish Constabulary.
- The medal was issued unnamed.
- It was worn in date order with Coronation and Jubilee medals.
