= Queen Victoria Police Jubilee Medal =

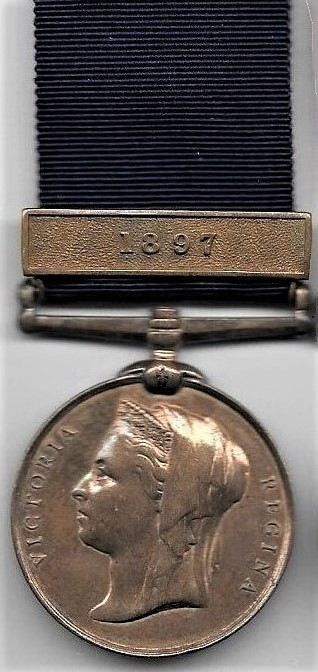
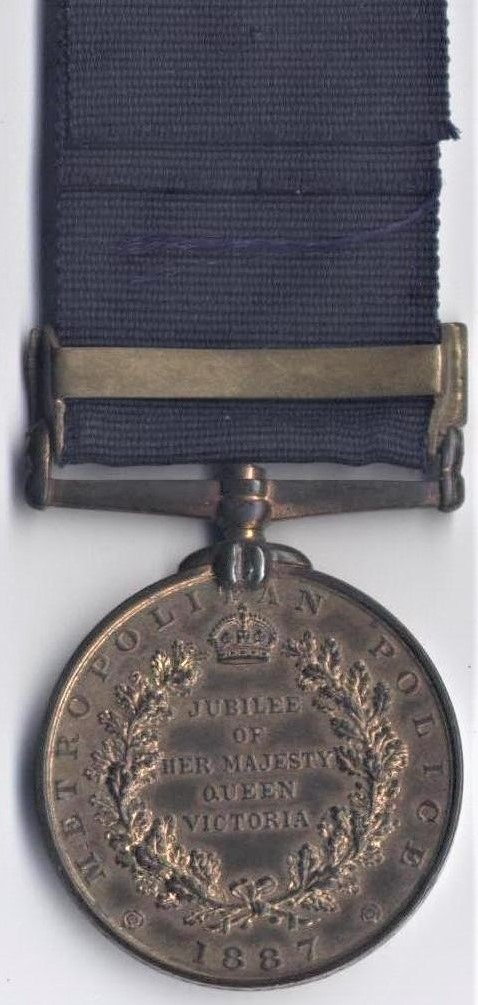
- Obverse and reverse: Metropolitan Police version for 1887, with 1897 clasp.
- Awarded for: Duty at the Jubilee celebrations in London
- Presented by: United Kingdom
- Established: 1887 for Golden Jubilee; 1897 for Diamond Jubilee

Highlights
- Total: 1887: 14,900 medals 1897: 10,086 medals, 9,193 clasps
- Ribbon: Queen Victoria Police Jubilee Medal
- Related: Victoria's Golden Jubilee Medal; Victoria's Diamond Jubilee Medal

A Police Jubilee Medal was awarded to those on duty at Queen Victoria's Golden and Diamond Jubilee celebrations.

== Eligibility ==
The Police Golden Jubilee Medal was sanctioned by Queen Victoria in 1887 as an award to all members of the Metropolitan and City of London Police on duty in London during the official Golden Jubilee celebrations, including the Jubilee procession on 21 June 1887.

Ten years later, the Police Diamond Jubilee Medal was awarded for duty at the principal Diamond Jubilee events on the same basis as the 1887 medal, eligibility having been widened to include firemen and members of ambulance units. Those in possession of the earlier Golden Jubilee Police Medal who again qualified, received a dated clasp to be fixed to their existing medal.

== Award ==
Below are the number of medals awarded, the wording of the service being that inscribed on the medal:

Service inscribed on medal	1887: medals	1897: medals	1897: clasps
Metropolitan Police	14,000	7,481	8,708
City of London Police	900	535	485
London County Council Metropolitan Fire Brigade	–	950	–
St John Ambulance Brigade	–	910	–
Police Ambulance	–	210	–
Total	14,900	10,086	9,193

== Description ==
The medal and ribbon were identical for the 1887 and 1897 medal, with the exception of the year inscribed on the reverse.
The medal is of bronze, 1.4 inches (36 mm) in diameter and has a plain straight ribbon bar.

- Obverse: A left-facing bust of the Queen, designed by L. C. Wyon, with the inscription VICTORIA REGINA.
- Reverse: An oak wreath surmounted by a crown. Within the wreath is the inscription JUBILEE OF HER MAJESTY QUEEN VICTORIA with, outside, the name of the service in which the recipient served and, below, the date of the jubilee – either 1887 or 1897.
- Clasp: A bronze clasp inscribed 1897, attached to the suspension bar of the 1887 medal.
- Ribbon: Plain dark blue, 1.25 inches (32 mm) wide.
- The recipient's rank, name and division were engraved on the edge of the medal.
- The medal was worn in date order with other Royal commemorative medals. These were worn before campaign medals until November 1918, after which the order of wear was changed, with such medals now worn after campaign medals and before long service awards.
