= Langham Estate =

Property company in the West End of London, England

Coordinates: 51.5170782°N 0.139501°W

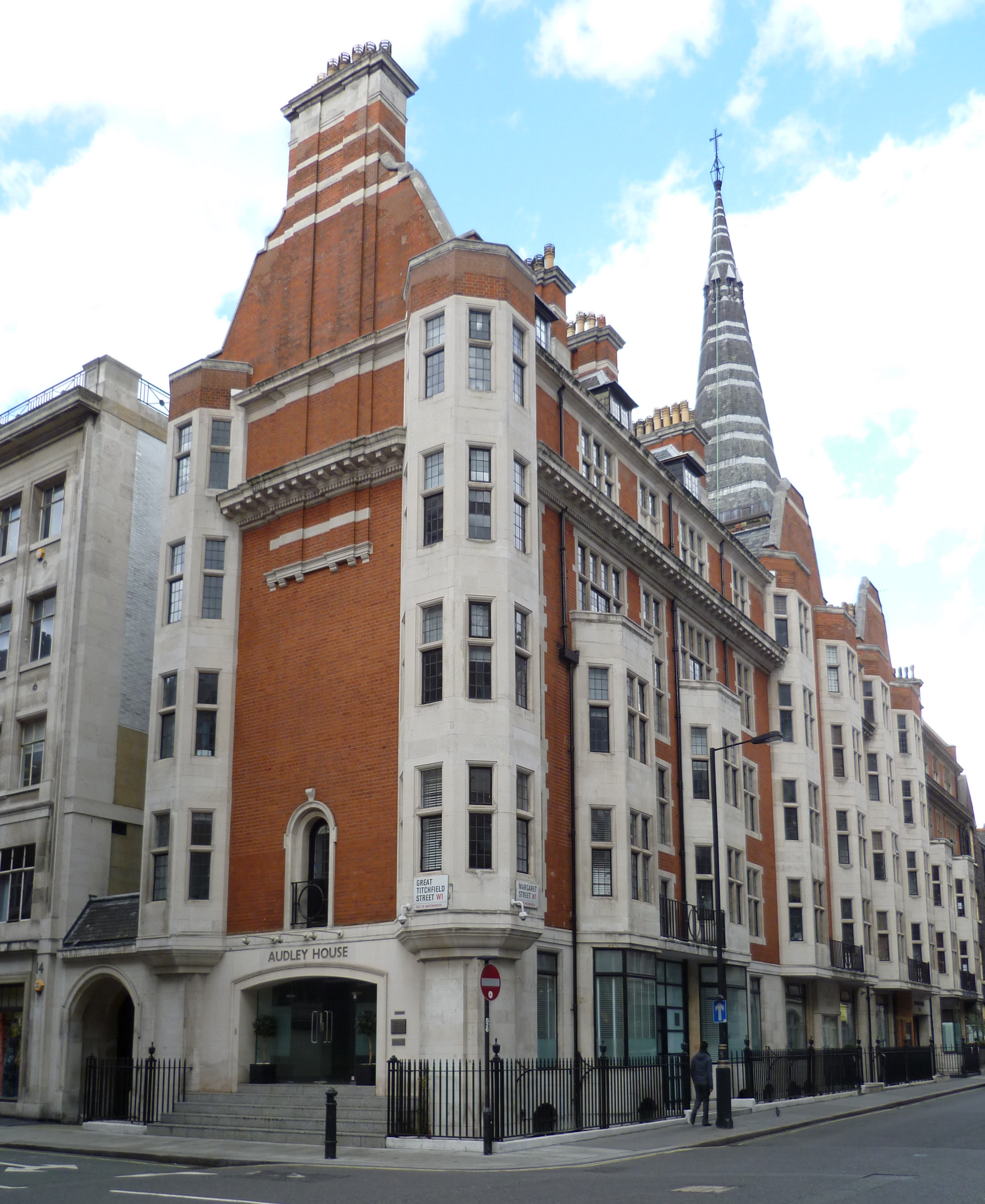
- The Langham Estate's offices are located on Margaret Street, London W1
- Company type: Private limited company by shares
- Industry: Real estate management
- Founded: 9 December 1993
- Headquarters: London, UK
- Area served: 13.8 acres (prior to 2024 partial sale)
- Key people: Malcolm Pugh
- Owner: Samuel Tak Lee
- Parent: Mount Eden Land Limited (Guernsey)

The Langham Estate is a property estate in Fitzrovia, London, and is owned by the Mount Eden Land Limited (Guernsey). The company controls 14 acres of real estate in central London. A third of its property portfolio was sold in 2024.

== Background ==
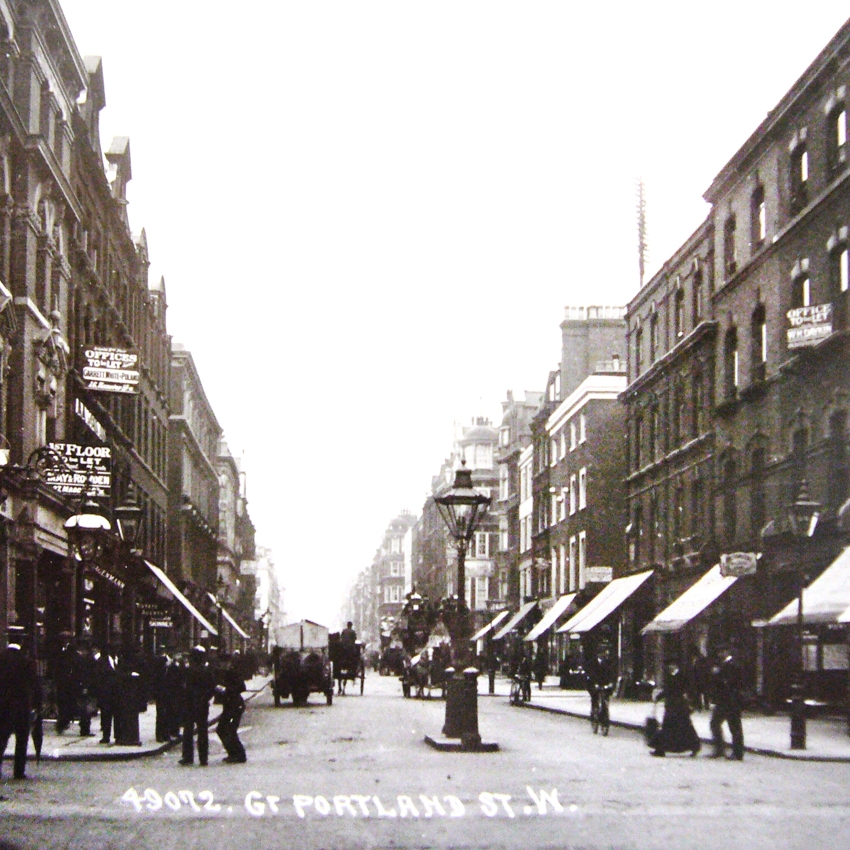
Great Portland Street as seen in the early 1900s

The Langham Estate originates from an entity first established in 1925 to manage a holding of 40 acres of land purchased from the Howard de Walden Estate in central London. The properties, acquired for £3m and located in eastern Marylebone, then passed through various owners, including Sir John Ellerman's Audley Trust, before being acquired in 1994 by Guernsey-based Mount Eden Land Ltd for £51m. Under Sir John Ellerman, the holdings covered almost all Great Portland Street, and much of streets alongside it (including Hallam, Bolsover, Margaret and Great Titchfield Streets). Numerous holdings on Great Portland Street were divested over the years.

The Langham Estate operates in an area noted for its media connections, restaurants, design showrooms and art galleries. The Langham Estate was described in 2017 as being one of London's 16 Great Estates with its footprint of 13.8 acres of central London property. Many of the entity's original properties are still held—but now in the form of freehold as their long leases have been sold off.

Samuel Tak Lee of Hong Kong is said to be its owner. Mr Lee reportedly sought control of Shaftesbury PLC's neighbouring 15-acre estate until his interests in it were sold in June 2020.

== Recent developments ==
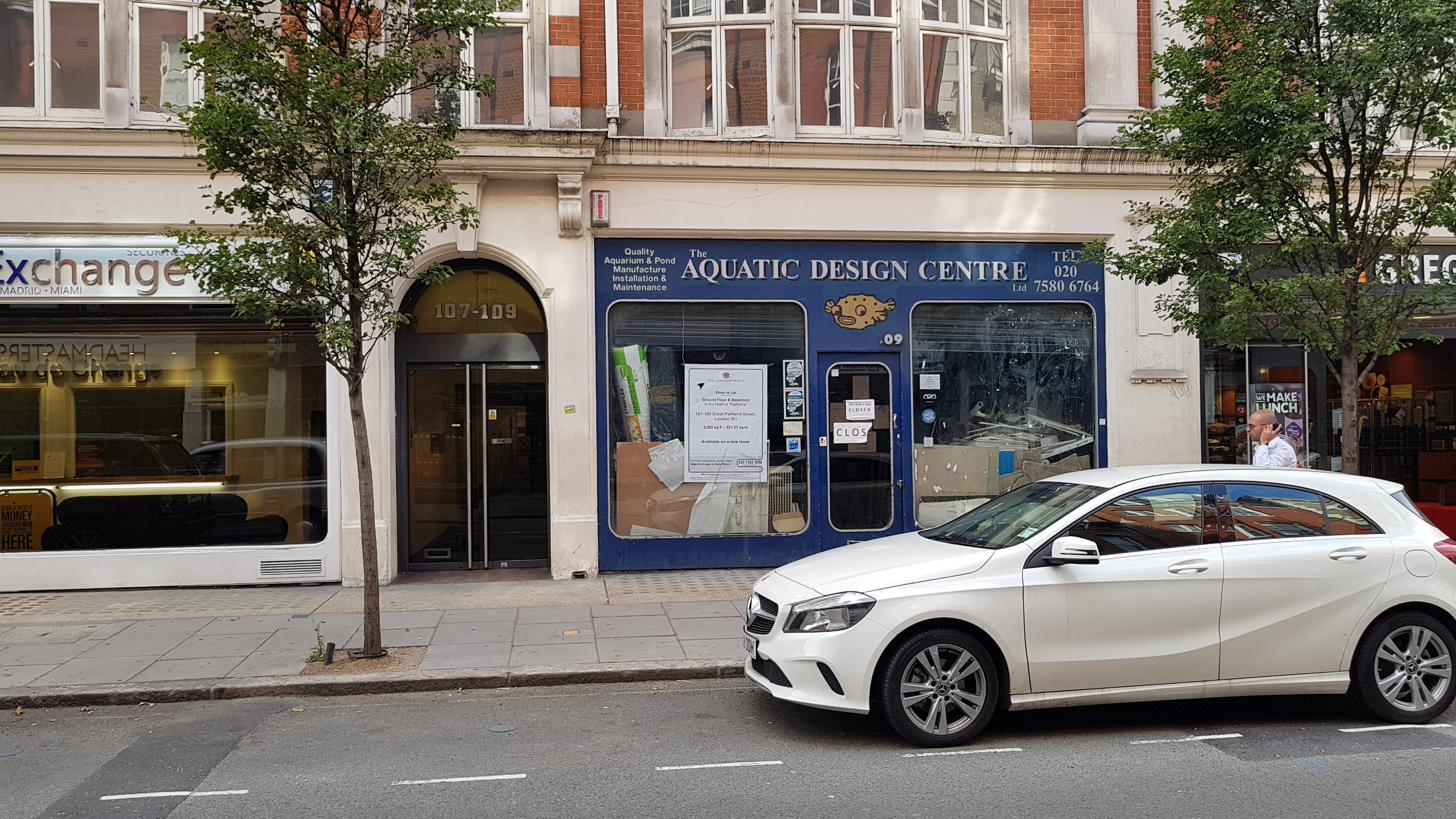
Great Portland Street is long known for its shops and restaurants

The Fitzrovia real estate market has been undergoing a renewal. The area has witnessed significant increase in rents and rates along with markedly higher occupant turnovers. Property values have increased in part due to changes in planning constraints, along with the impact of the Cross Rail and Oxford Street projects, which were projected to increase commercial activity in the area.

The company markets some of its properties under the banners of Noho and/or FitzNovia to describe an area just north of Oxford Street and just west of Regent Street. The company website states the company holds a "1.3 million sq feet (29 acre) mixed portfolio of office, showroom, retail, restaurant, bar, residential and storage" properties.

A neighbourhood plan is being developed for Langham Estate's Fitzrovia area. This is being done in consultation with stakeholders, the Langham Estate and other local landlords, businesses and residents. The plan focused on improving the local amenity, affordable housing provision, poor broadband data services and air pollution conditions.

In August 2023, Langham Estate decided to divest itself of a third of its property holdings. These included 27 freehold assets of offices, retail, leisure, educational, medical and residential properties in northern Fitzrovia. These properties were reportedly sold for over £300m Elliott Management and Oval Real Estate in January 2024.

In December 2024, The Langham Estate introduced Fitzrovia Quarter - described as a dynamic space in the western part of Fitzrovia, located within London’s West End, and home to a thriving community of innovators, creatives, and businesses.

== Gallery ==
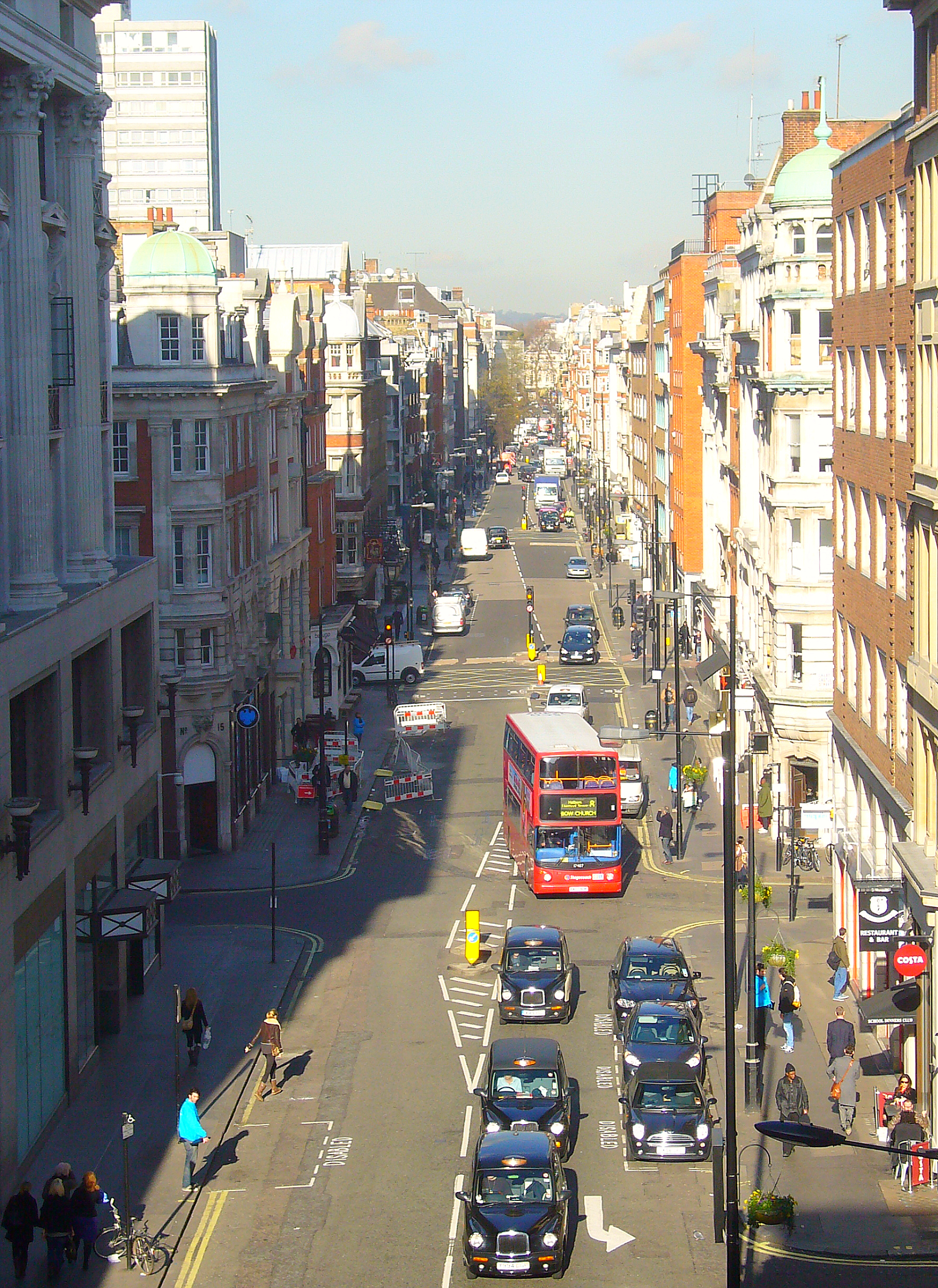
Many Langham Estate holdings are found at the southern end of Great Portland Street

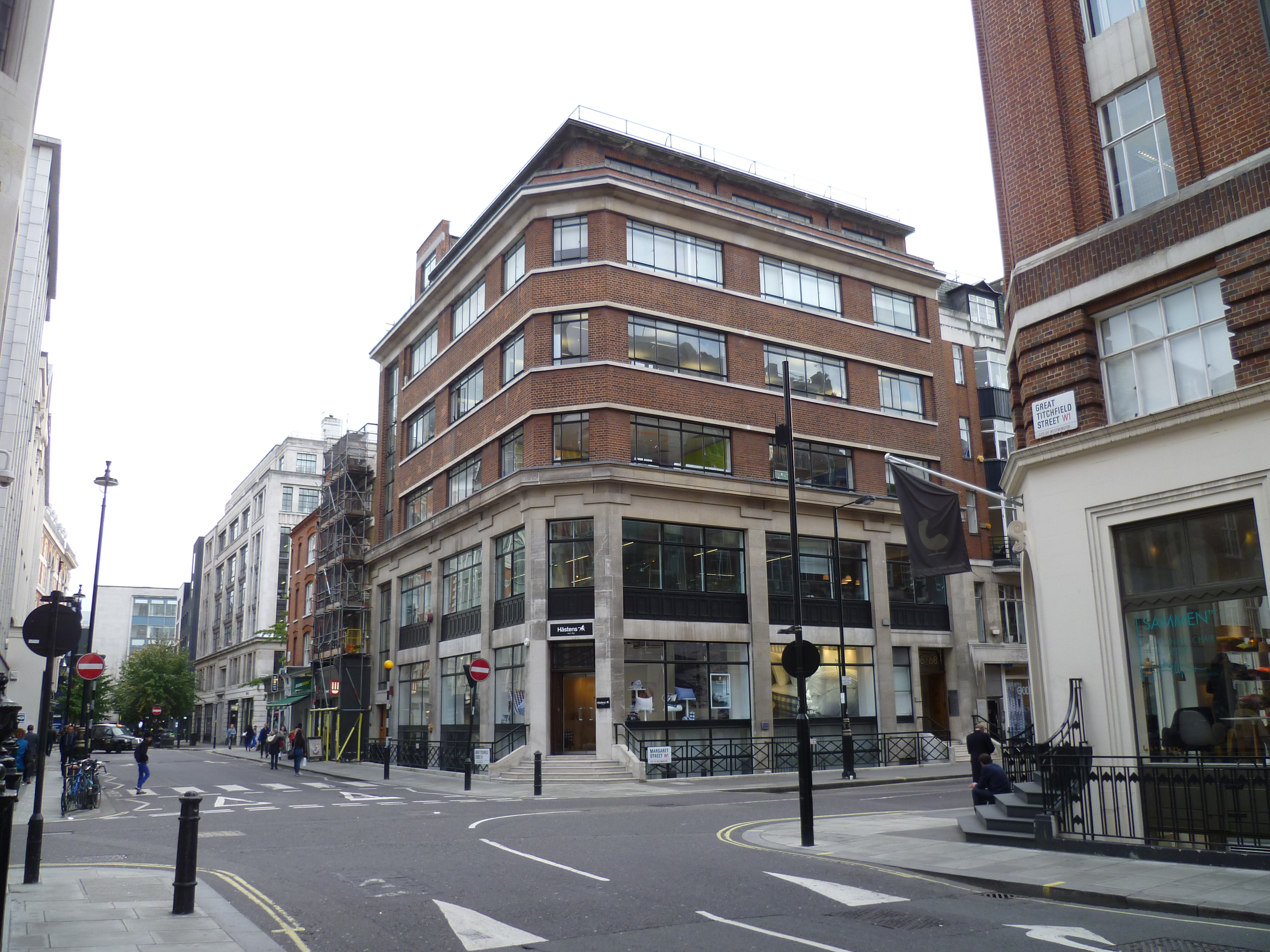
Numerous buildings on Great Titchfield Street and Margaret Street are part of the Langham Estate

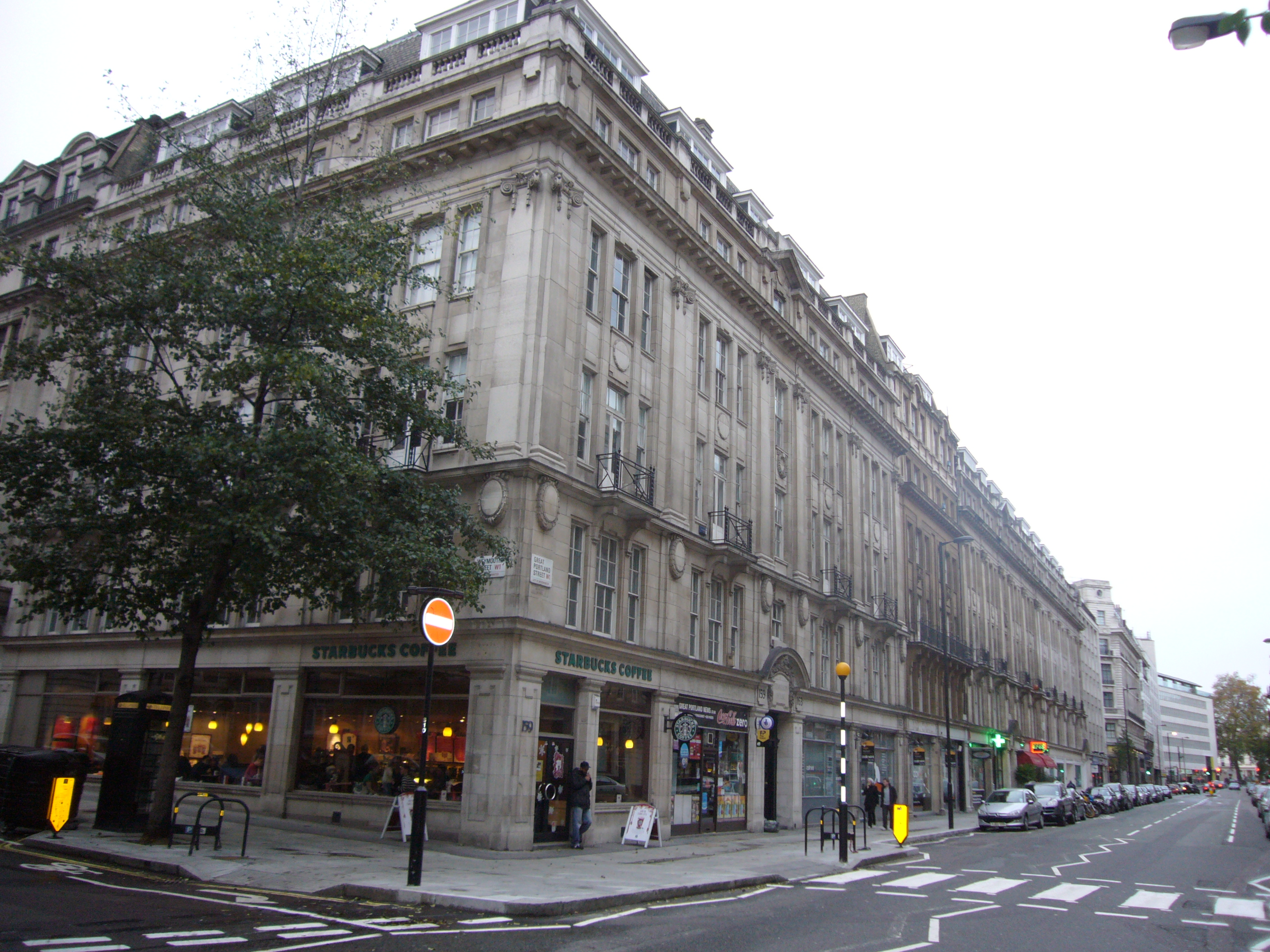
Langham Estate historic holding on Great Portland Street

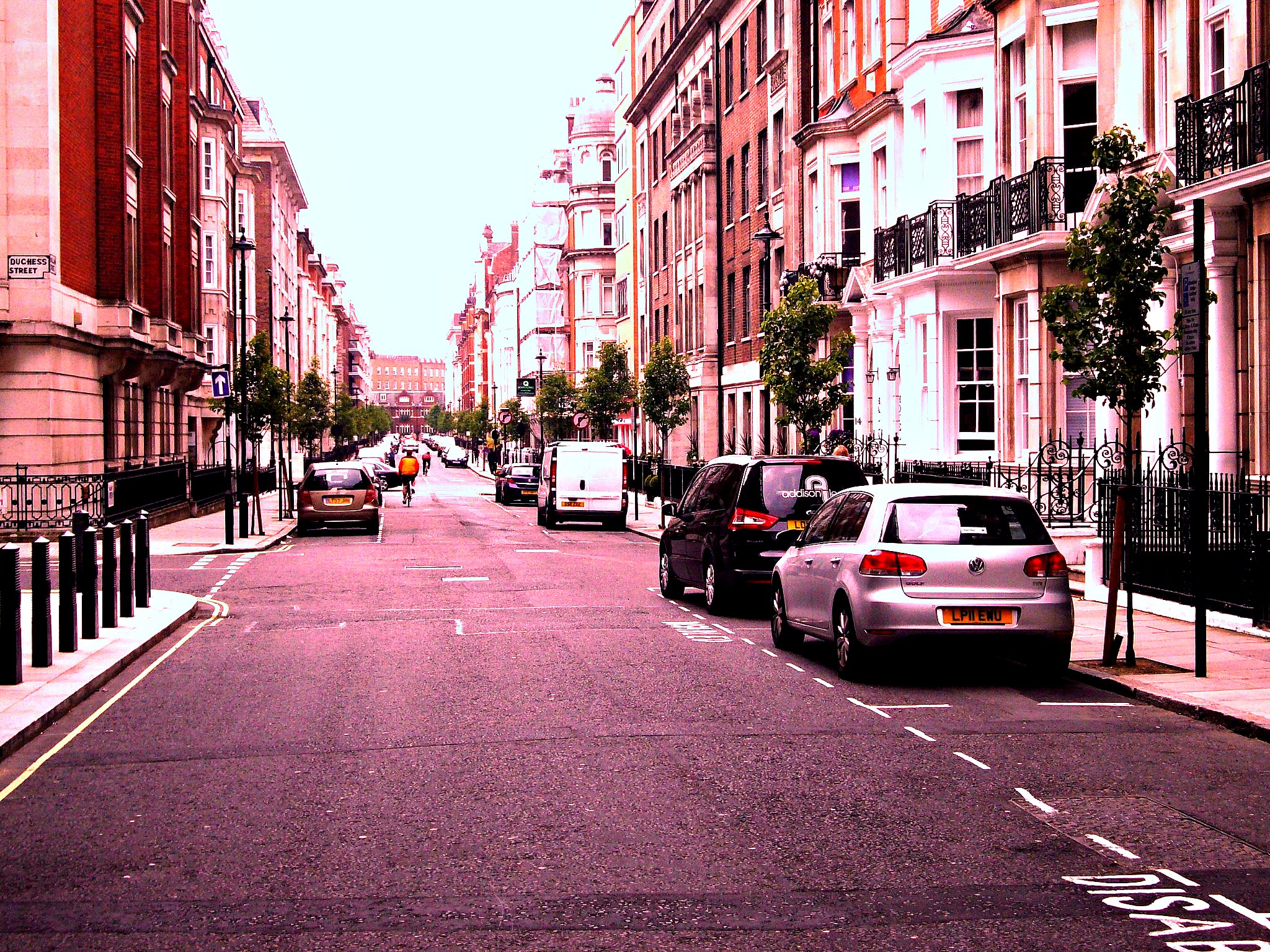
Langham Estate properties on Hallam Street

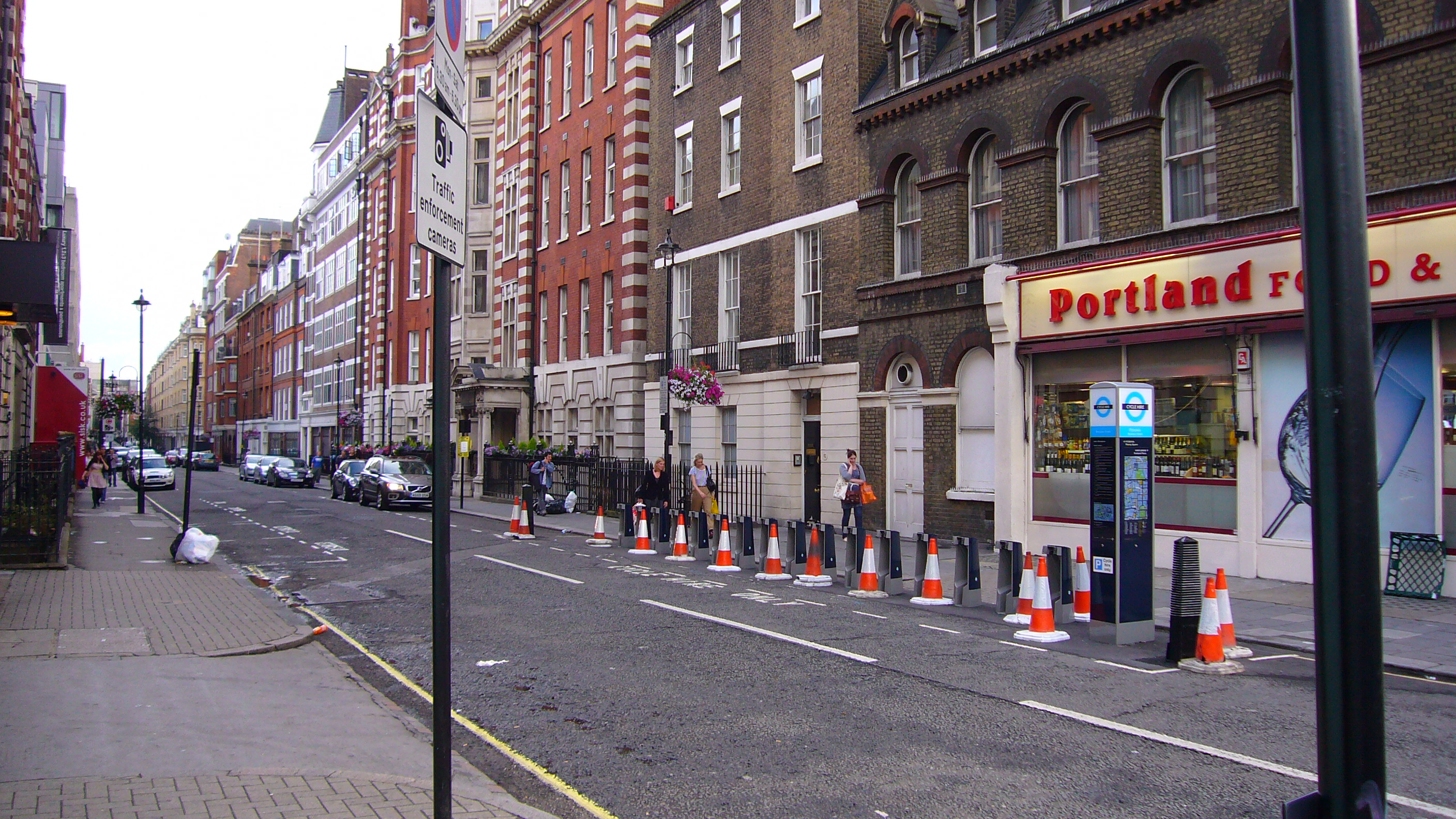
Bolsover Street is the location of a number of Langham Estate properties
