= Capital and Counties =

Capital and Counties may refer to two separate real estate investment companies, both of which were formerly part of Liberty International plc:

- Capital & Counties Properties, a London-focused firm listed on the London Stock Exchange
- Capital and Counties USA, a California-based firm owned by Capital Shopping Centres Group plc
