= Pelorus (yacht) =

Motor yacht built by Lürssen

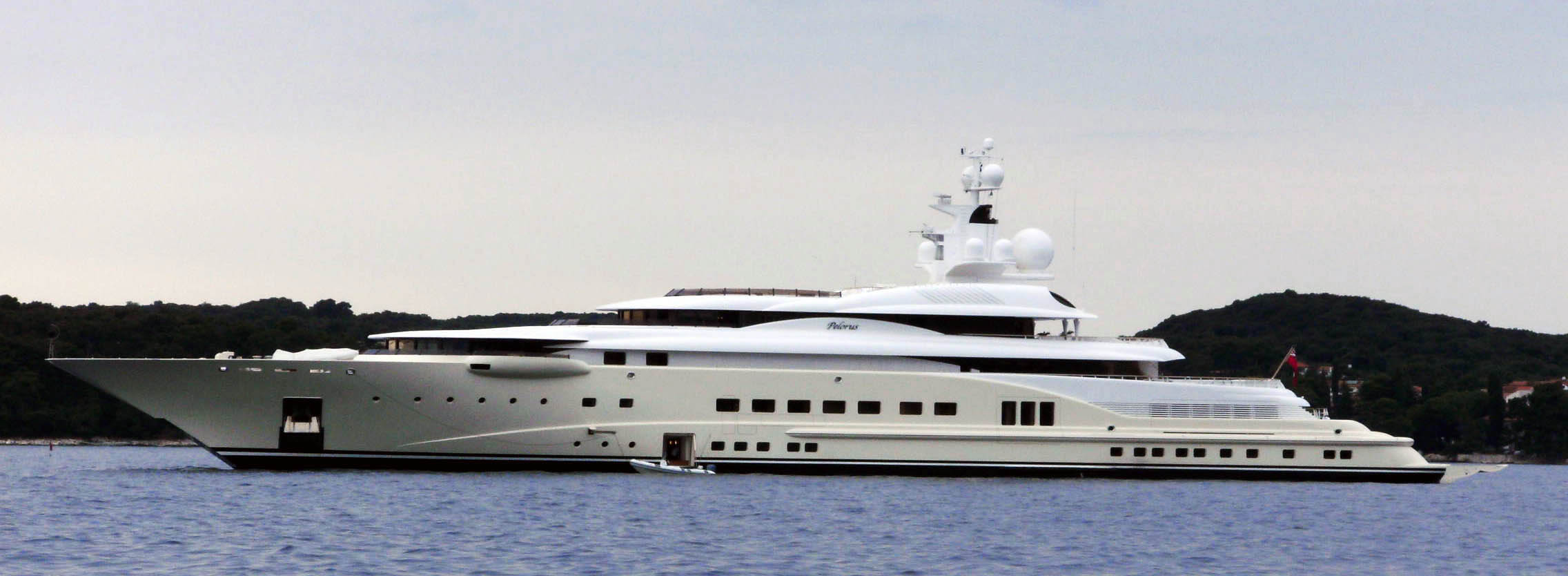
- Pelorus in Croatia

History

Bermuda
- Name: Pelorus
- Owner: Samathur Li
- Port of registry: Hamilton, Bermuda
- Ordered: 1999
- Builder: Lürssen
- Yard number: 13600
- Laid down: 27 July 2000
- Launched: 24 May 2001
- Completed: 2003
- Identification: IMO number: 8977273; MMSI number: 319029200; Callsign: ZGBO3

General characteristics
- Class & type: GL+100 A5 Motor Yacht +MC AUT
- Tonnage: 5,317 GT; 2,973 DWT
- Length: 115 metres (377 ft)
- Beam: 17.2 metres (56 ft)
- Draft: 4.66 metres (15.3 ft)
- Depth: 5.10 metres (16.7 ft)
- Decks: 5 plus tank top
- Installed power: 7,800 kilowatts (10,500 hp)
- Propulsion: 2 x 3,900kW Wärtsilä 12v 26
- Speed: 19 knots
- Boats & landing craft carried: Landing boats; Jet skis
- Crew: 46
- Aviation facilities: Two helicopter pads

Pelorus is a luxury yacht and is 115 metres (377 ft) in length.

== History ==
Commissioned by Saudi Arabian businessman Sheikh Abdul Mohsen Abdulmalik Al-Sheikh, Pelorus was built at the Lürssen subsidiary repair shipyard in Schacht-Audorf Rendsburg, Germany. The conceptual design was completed in 1999 by Tim Heywood, work began in 2000, and the yacht entered service in 2003. It was sold to Roman Abramovich during its maiden voyage, who had it altered by Blohm & Voss, adding a second helicopter pad (on top of the wheelhouse), two B&V active fin stabilizers replaced by four zero-speed stabilizers, and modifications to the underwater exhaust, mast, and stern.

Pelorus is powered by two Wärtsilä (formerly Stork Werkspoor) 12v 26 engines designed to give continuous 3900 kW at 1000 r.p.m. On the builder's sea trial Pelorus reached the contract speed of 20 knots, but often cruises between 12 and 14 knots. While owned by Abramovich, the yacht had a full-time crew of up to 46, in addition to a large security contingent that travelled with his family. Pelorus would cruise the western Mediterranean Sea during the summers, and commonly ventured down through the Suez Canal for the winters.

In 2005, Abramovich lent Pelorus to Frank Lampard and John Terry for two weeks as a bonus for being the two best players at his English football club Chelsea F.C. the previous season, and allowed Terry to honeymoon with his new wife, Toni Poole, on the yacht in 2007.

Abramovich sold it via broker Merle Wood to David Geffen in 2011 for around US$300 million. In 2011, Geffen sold Pelorus to Sheikh Abdullah bin Zayed bin Sultan Al Nahyan for 214 million euros. In 2016, Pelorus was sold to Hong Kong billionaire Samuel Tak Lee.
