= Samathur Li =

Hong Kong businessman

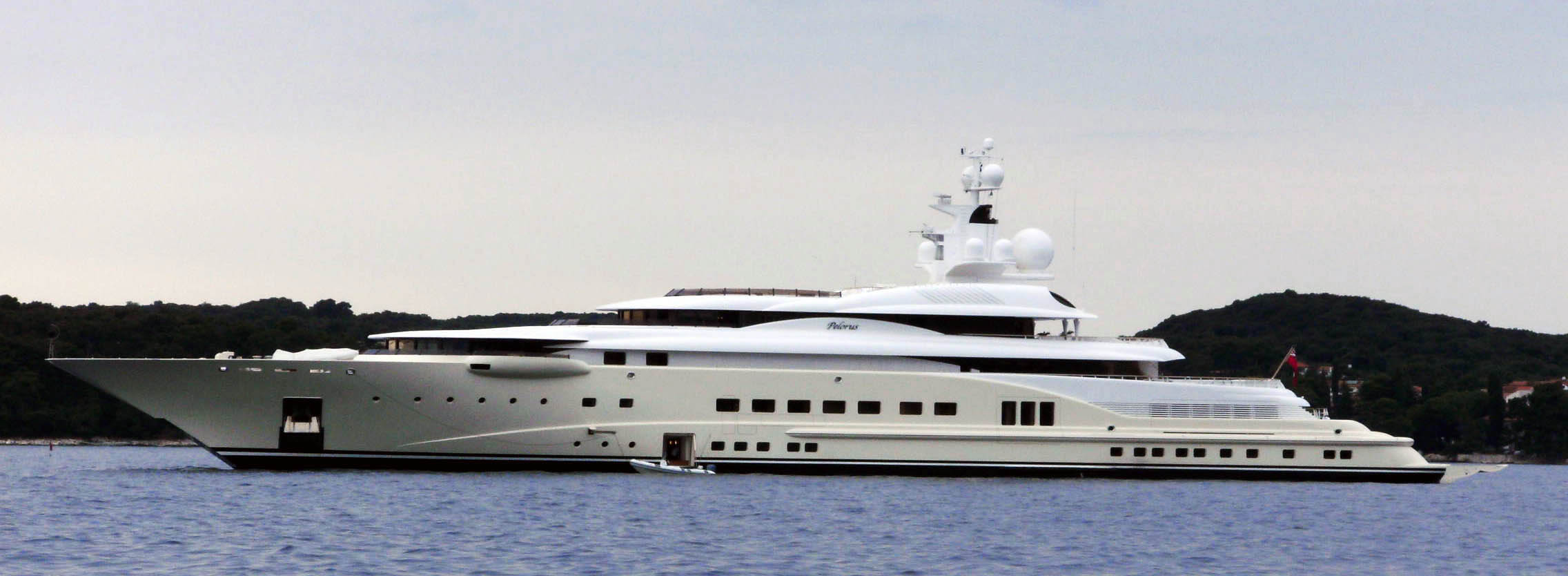
Li's yacht Pelorus in Croatia

Samathur Li Kin-kan (born 1973) is a Hong Kong businessman, and the eldest son of Hong Kong billionaire Samuel Tak Lee.

== Early life ==
Samathur Li Kin-kan is the eldest son of Hong Kong billionaire property developer Samuel Tak Lee (1939–2026).

== Business career ==
Li has been a director of various family businesses. In or after 2013, he pursued a lawsuit for a claimed loss of US$20 million against a firm using a "robot hedge fund".

In 2021, Li was working on a not-for-profit biomass generation scheme using brownfield land to produce "raw materials for environmentally-friendly fuels as well as generating carbon credits".

== Motorsports career ==
Li is the founder and owner of the British-based car racing Team Veloqx, which won the British GT Championship in its first season in 2002. In 2004, with two Audi R8 LMP1 prototypes, they won the Sebring 12 Hours and came second at the Le Mans 24 Hours. Team Veloqx took a break from 2004 for Li to focus on the family real estate business, but was relaunched in 2021, with plans to compete in the 2025 FIA World Endurance Championship with a Veloqx Fangio Hypercar. As of 2026, the project has yet to come to fruition.

== Personal life ==
In December 2011, the Hong Kong High Court ordered Li to pay his wife of eight years, Florence Tsang, a 38-year-old solicitor, a divorce settlement of HK$1.2 billion ($154 million or £98 million). The divorce occurred because she refused to have an abortion. The package included real estate and club membership fees in Hong Kong and London, and fees to buy three luxury cars and a yacht. Tsang had sought HK$6.4 billion, more than half of their joint assets. In January 2014, the Hong Kong Court of Appeal reduced the divorce settlement to HK$411 million, following an appeal by Li and his father.

Li owns the Cayman Islands-registered superyacht Pelorus, previously owned by Roman Abramovich, and later David Geffen.

Li is a car collector, and owns the Rolls-Royce Sweptail, which, at the time of launch, was the most expensive new car ever, priced at over £10 million.
