= Hallam Street =

Street in the City of Westminster, London

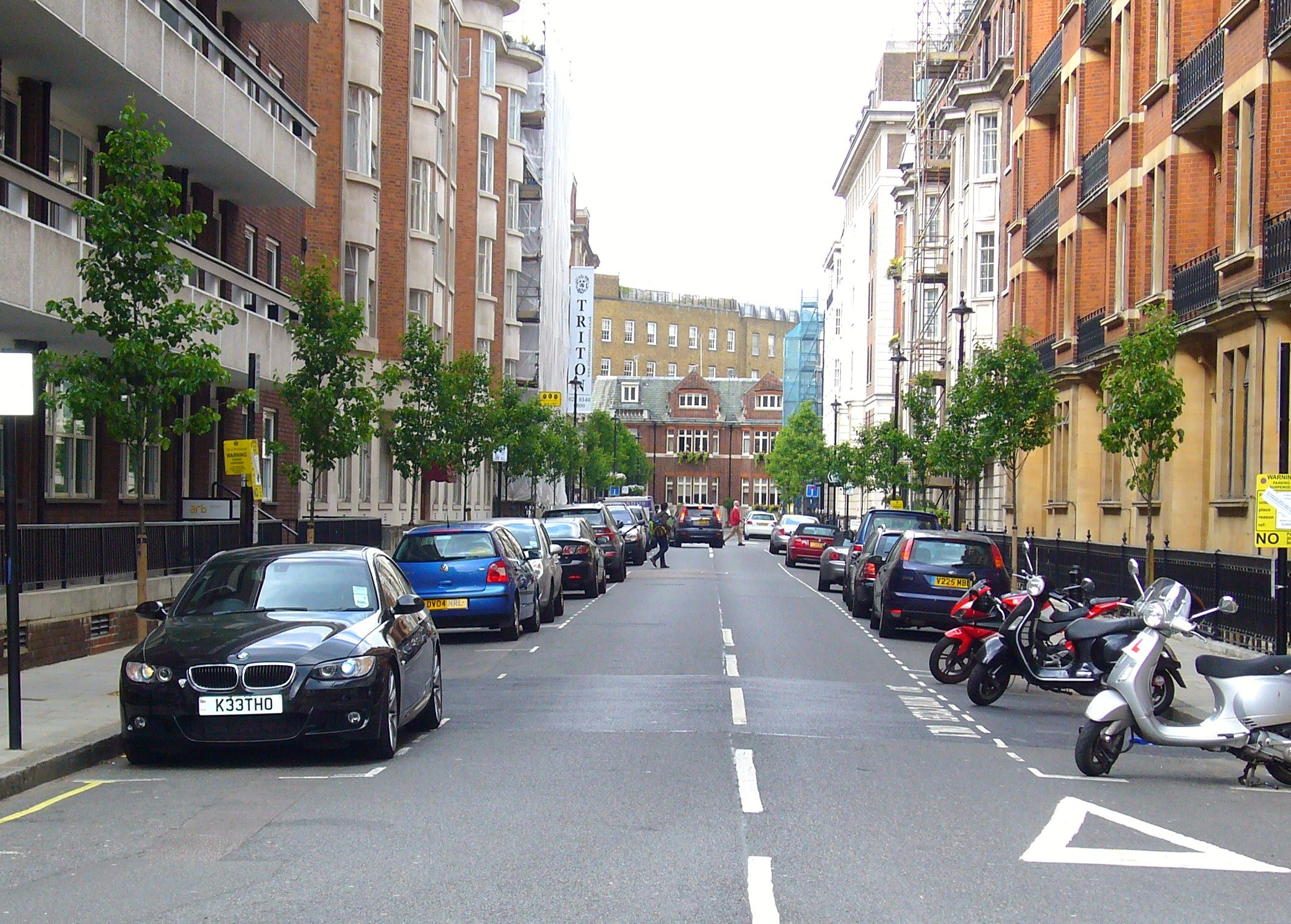
- Tree lined Hallam Street
- Former name(s): Charlotte Street; Duke Street
- Namesake: Henry Hallam
- Length: 0.3 mi (0.48 km)
- Postal code: W1
- Coordinates: 51.5213°N 0.1439°W
- south end: Broadcasting House; Langham Street
- north end: no junction

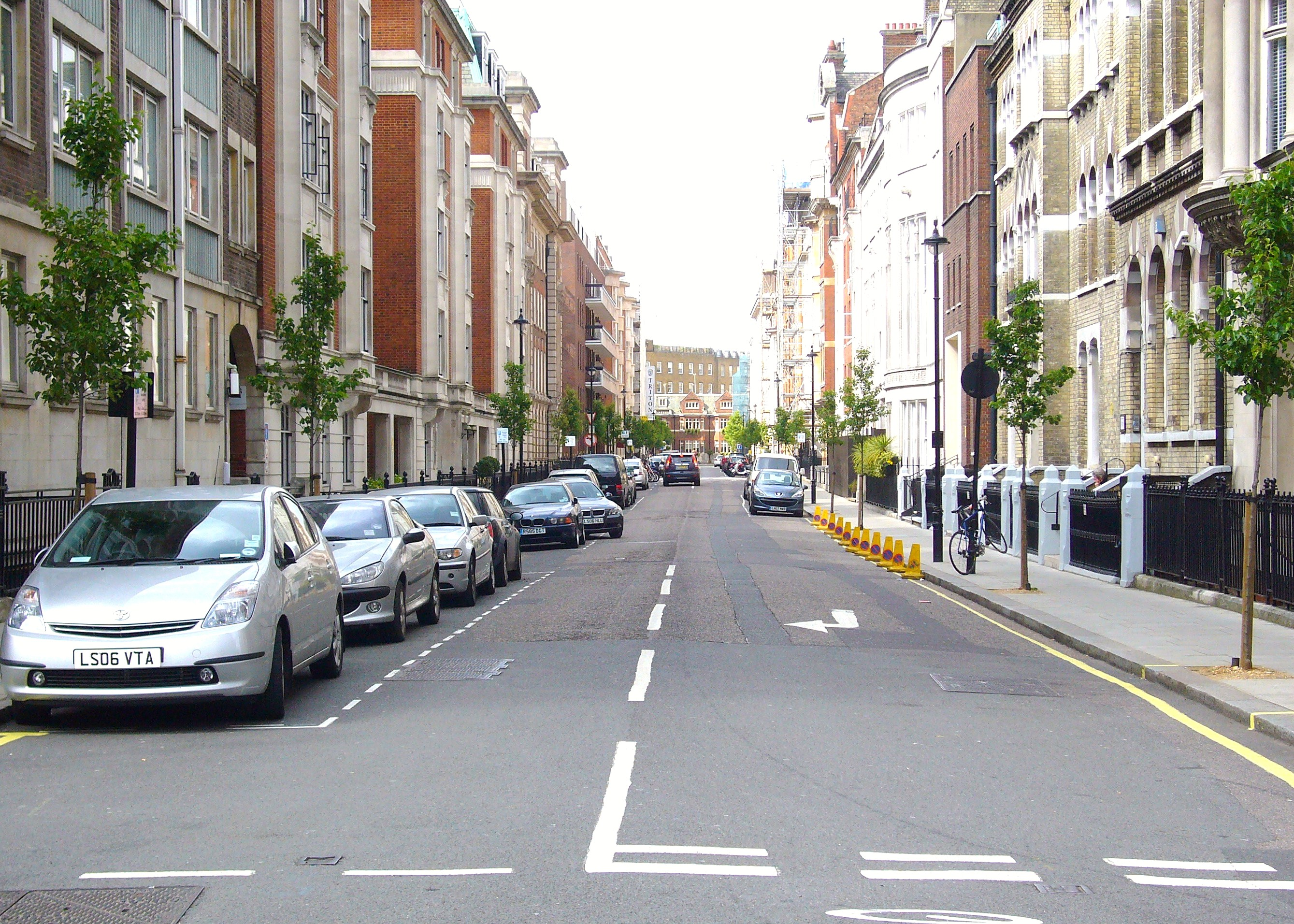
View of Hallam Street in Marylebone, London

Hallam Street is a road situated in the Parish of St Marylebone and London's West End. In administrative terms, it lies within the City of Westminster's West End Ward as well as the Harley Street Conservation Area. Formerly named both Charlotte Street and Duke Street, it was renamed in the early 1900s after Henry Hallam (1777–1859), a noted historian who had been a local resident, and his son Arthur Henry Hallam (1811–1833), poet and the subject of Tennyson's elegy In Memoriam.

== History ==
Hallam Street is situated within the boundaries of the ancient Manor of St Marylebone. The history of the Manor can be traced back to the Domesday Book in the 11th century, when the area was divided into two manors: Lilestone and Tyburn. Much of the area was covered with forest and marshland and formed part of the great forest of Middlesex.

Like the better known Portland Place and Great Portland Street, Hallam Street was originally developed by the Dukes of Portland, who owned most of the eastern half of Marylebone in the 18th and 19th centuries. Richard Horwood’s 1790s map of London shows that Charlotte Street had by then been laid out exactly as Hallam Street is today. Maps from that period show houses lining the entire length of the street by that time. In the late 19th/early 20th century, following the expiration of individual buildings’ 99-year leases, Hallam Street was redeveloped and many of its original Georgian houses were replaced by larger mansion and office blocks.

== Buildings and notable residents ==
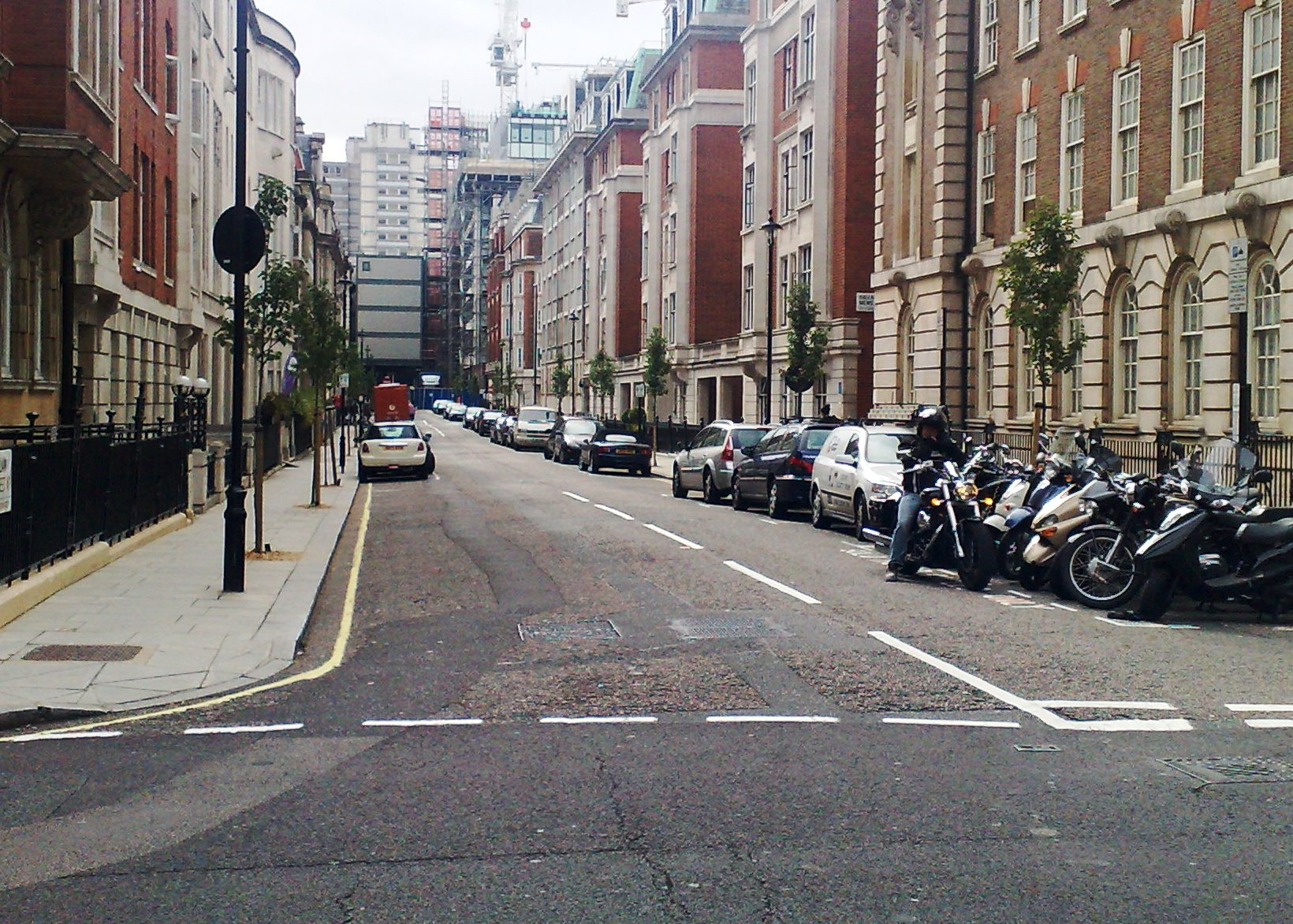
Hallam Street, view south from Weymouth Street

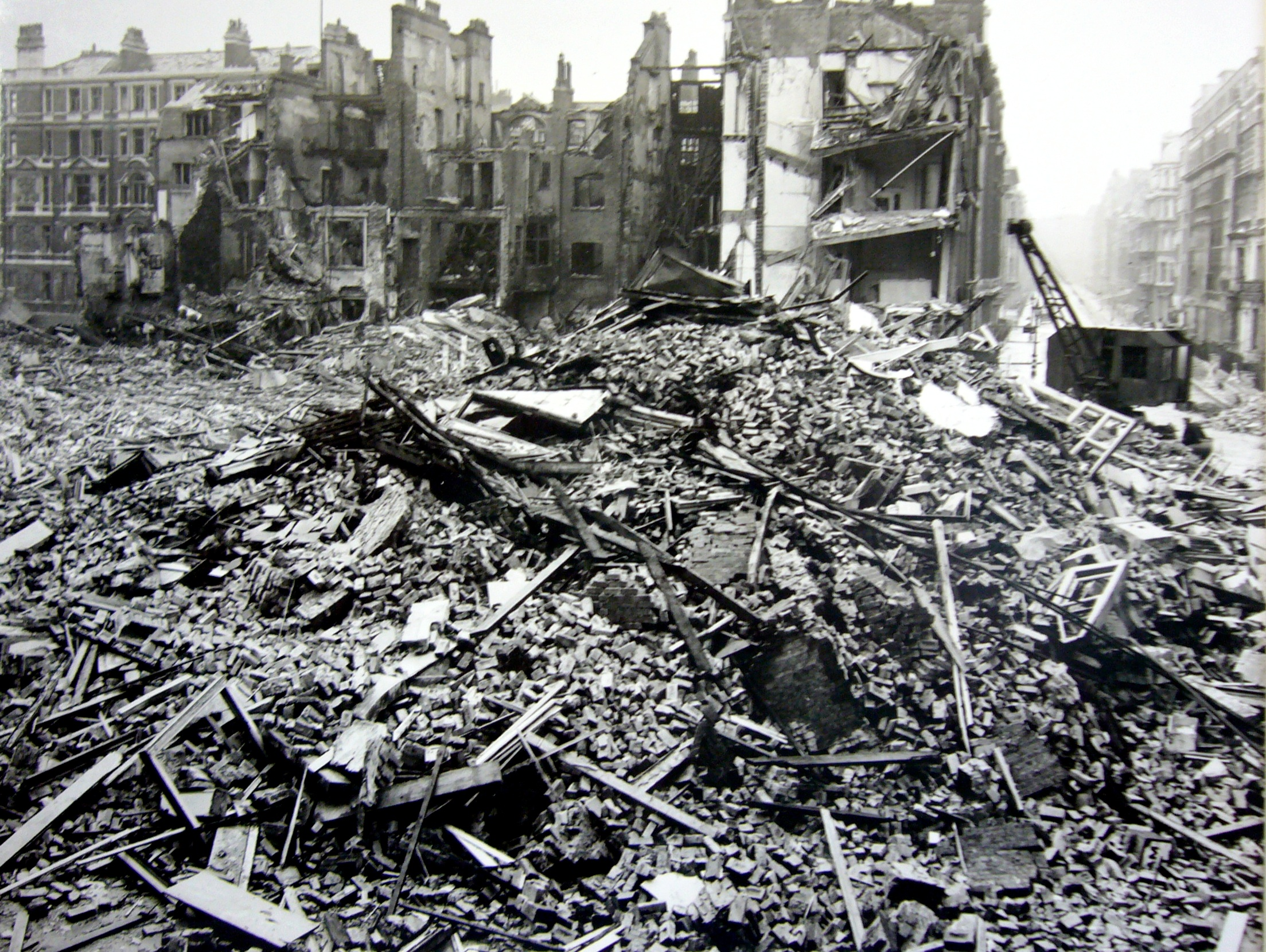
Blitz damage to Hallam Street

The street has buildings of mainly five to eight storeys with a strong residential presence. Notable residents who lived for a time in the street include the Pre-Raphaelite artist and poet Dante Gabriel Rossetti (1828–1882), the painters John Sell Cotman (1782-1842), Cornelius Varley (1781-1873), Sir Peter Francis Bourgeois(1753–1811), dominatrix Theresa Berkley (d.1836), the writer William Gerhardi (1895–1977), the conductor and founder of The Proms Sir Henry Joseph Wood (1869–1944), American journalist and broadcaster Edward R Murrow (1908–1965), World War Two hero Wing Commander Forest Frederick Edward Yeo-Thomas (1901–1964), the radio and television writer Ernest Dudley (1908–2006), and the Austrian writer Stefan Zweig (1881–1942).

Number 50 Charlotte Street (later renamed 93 Hallam Street) was both the home and official residence from 1875 to 1910 of Jesse Claxton who was the Registrar of Births and Deaths for St Marylebone for 35 years.

Numbers 44 and 50 Hallam Street, originally the offices of the General Medical Council, received Grade II designation in 1954. A large number of the street's buildings have been characterised as "unlisted buildings of merit" in the Harley Street Conservation Area Audit and are either part of the Howard de Walden Estate (originally the Portland Estate) or the Langham Estate (also once part of the Howard de Walden Estate).

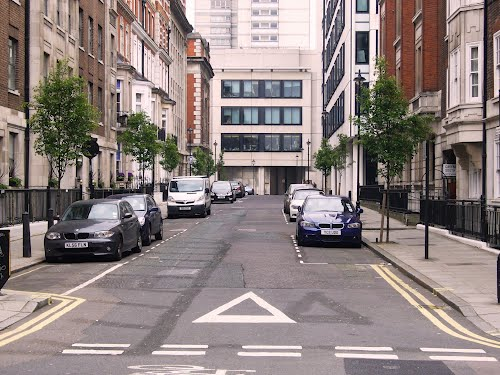
Broadcasting House at the South end of Hallam Street

Hallam Street contains a number of institutional buildings (including the BBC’s Broadcasting House) from the Edwardian and inter-war periods. Blitz bomb damage was extensive at the south end of the street, its synagogue was also destroyed while other buildings experienced blast damage.

== Recent developments ==
The redevelopment of Broadcasting House, whose modern rear elevation lies on Hallam Street, was completed in 2010. Its redevelopment is the BBC's single largest capital project ever, and has created a new centre for radio, news and world service in the heart of London. The BBC's facilities, a majority of the street's office buildings and its two hotels lie at the southern end of the street.

Trees were planted along the length of the street in 2009 and residential fibre-optic broadband infrastructure was also added to it in 2019.

== Notable buildings ==
There are a number of notable buildings on this Marylebone Street:

- Broadcasting House (BBC)
- 44 and 50 Hallam Street (Formerly the offices of the General Medical Council) - Conference venue and residential
- 47 Hallam Street (The Central London Synagogue) - Place of worship
- 49 Hallam Street - Residential mansion block
- 77 Hallam Street - Residential mansion block
- 84-94 Hallam Street (Weymouth House) - Residential mansion block
- 105 Hallam Street (Formerly Cunard White Star Line Lodge) - Residential mansion block
- 110 Hallam Street (Rossetti House) - Residential mansion block

=== Other buildings with elevations on Hallam Street ===
- 85 New Cavendish Street – De Walden Court - Residential mansion block & offices
- 1 Weymouth Street (Weymouth Court)- Residential mansion block
- 2 Weymouth Street (formerly YMCA Hostel) - Residential mansion block
- 9 Weymouth Street (Stone House) - Residential mansion block
- 10 Weymouth Street (Warpole House) - Residential mansion block - www.10weymouth.com
- 2 Devonshire Street (formerly YWCA Hostel) - Residential mansion block
- 54-57 Devonshire Street (Goodwood Court) - Residential mansion block

== Gallery ==
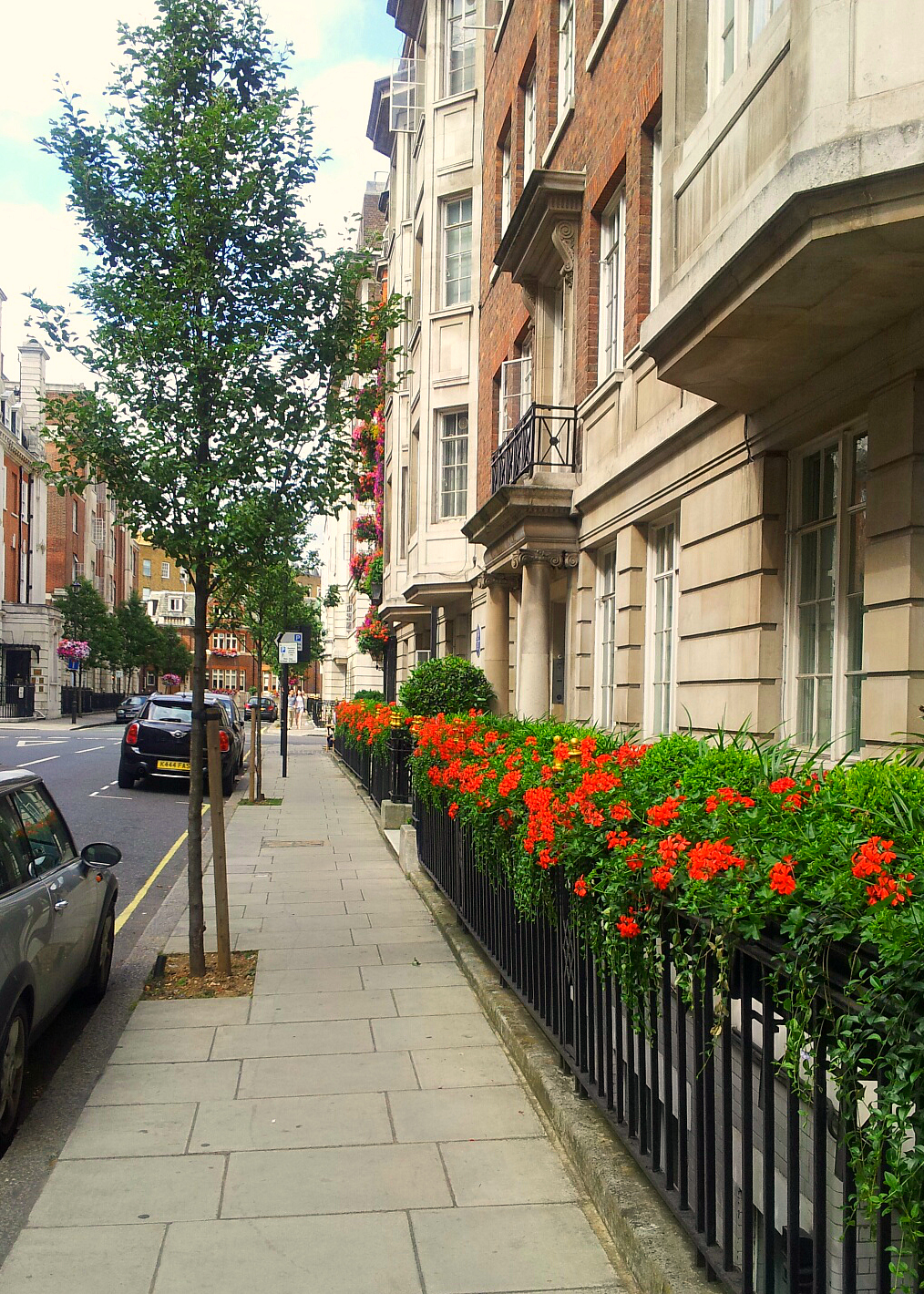
View of Hallam Street outside Weymouth House in Marylebone London W1

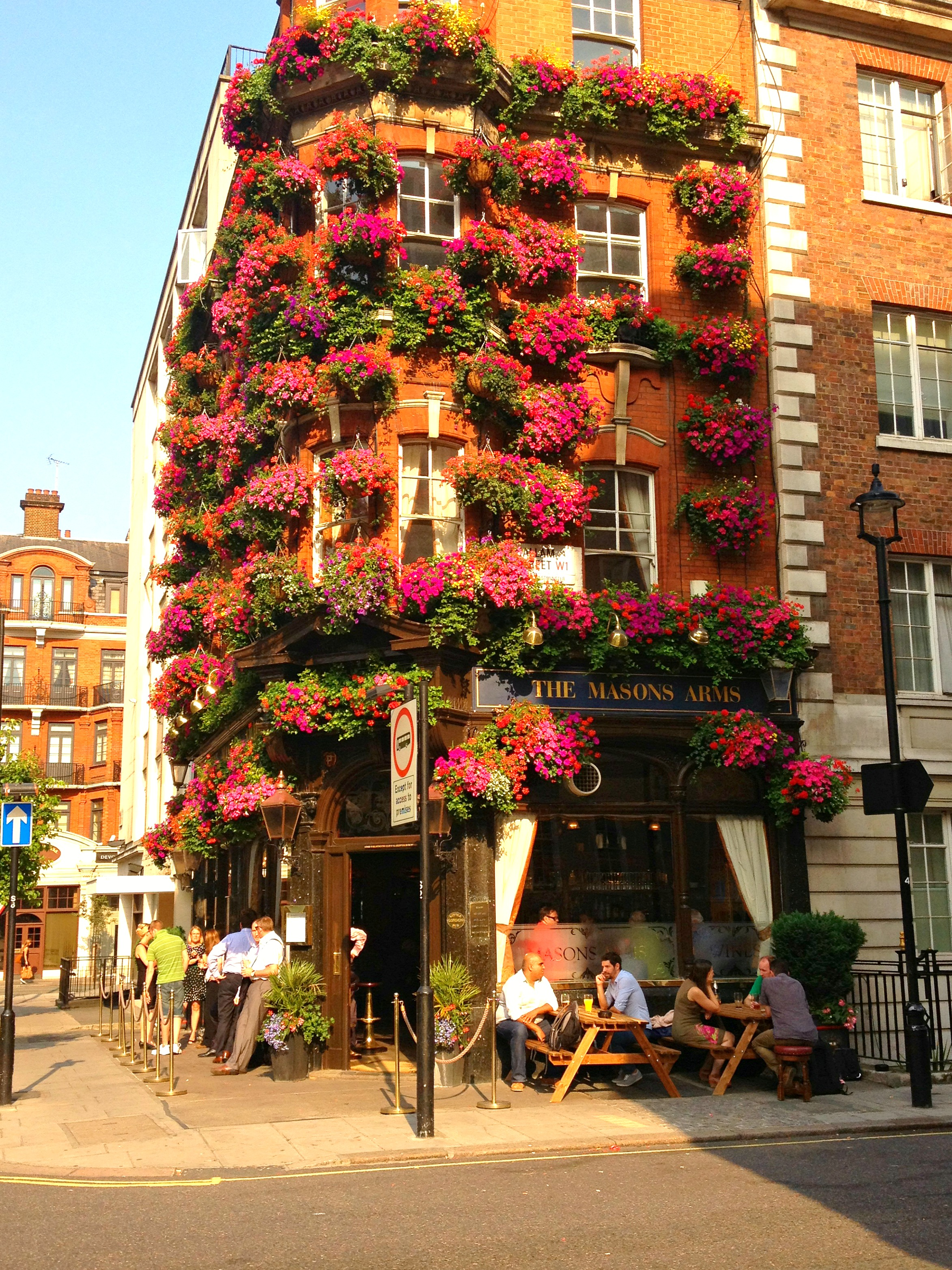
View of the Mason's Arms on Hallam Street in Marylebone London W1

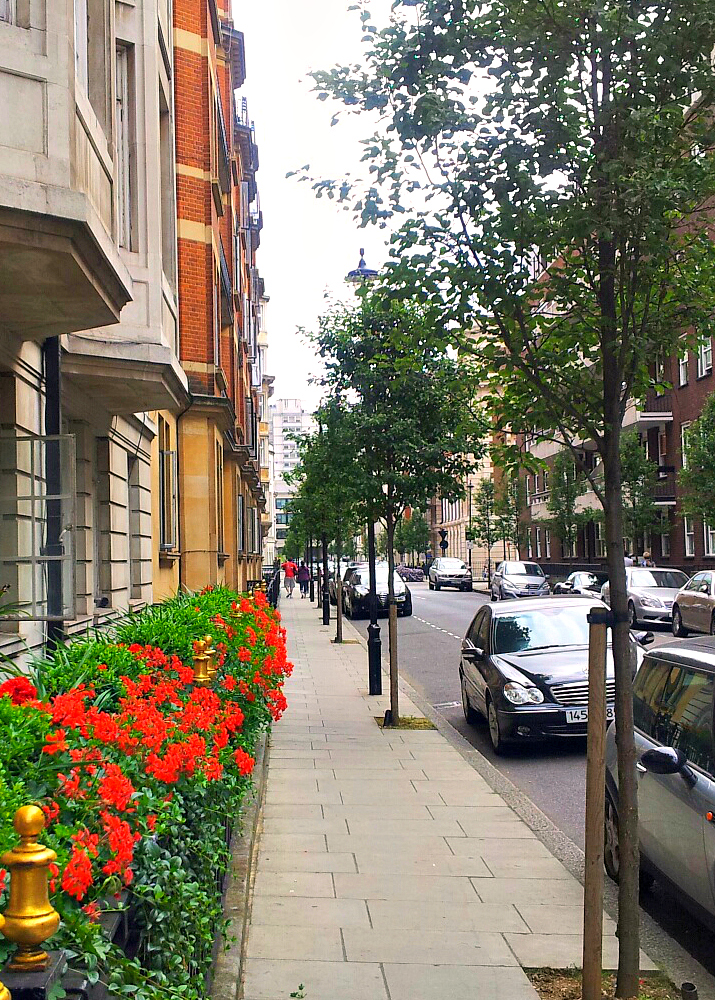
View South on Hallam St, Marylebone London W1

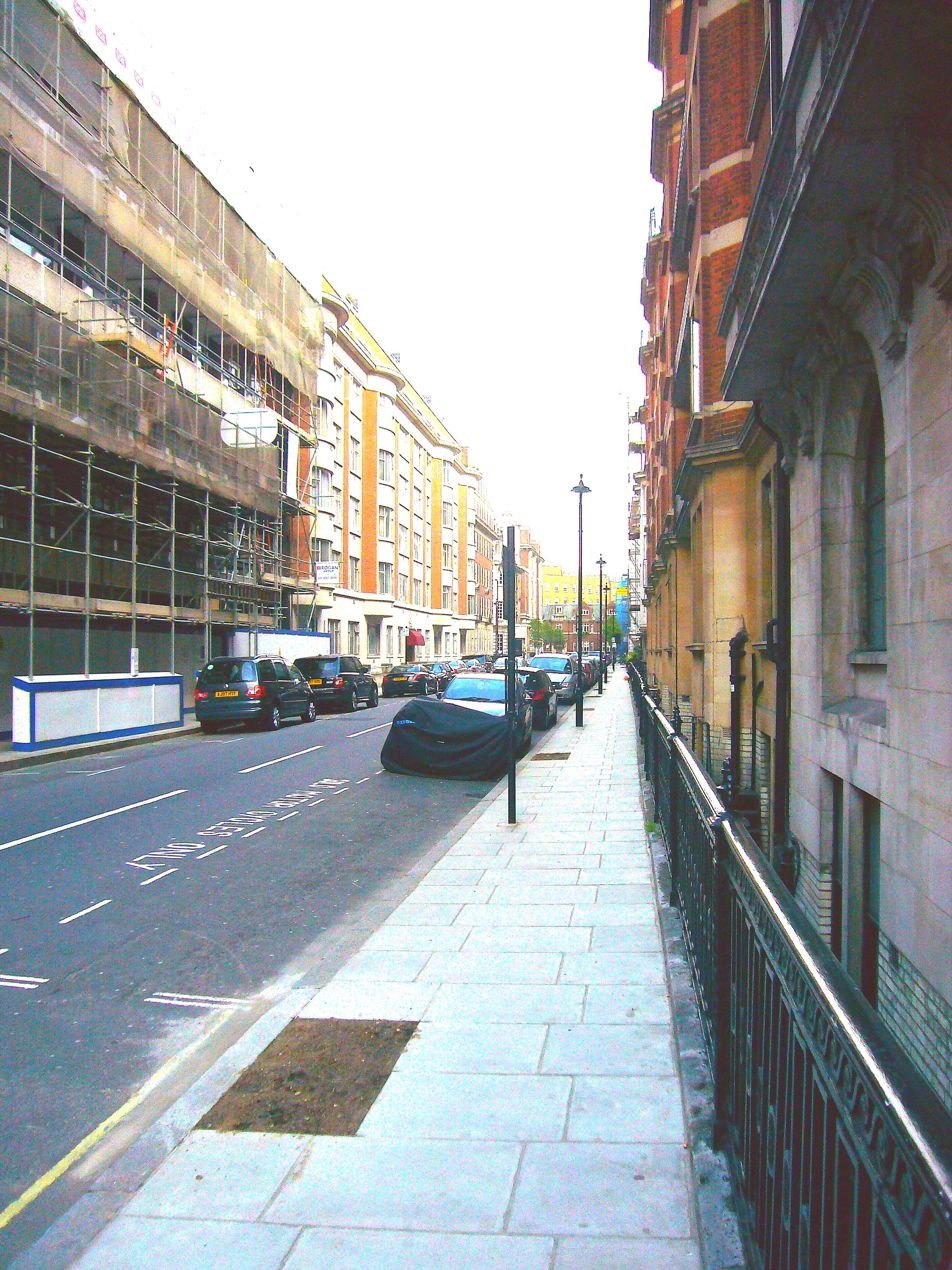
Hallam Street before trees were planted

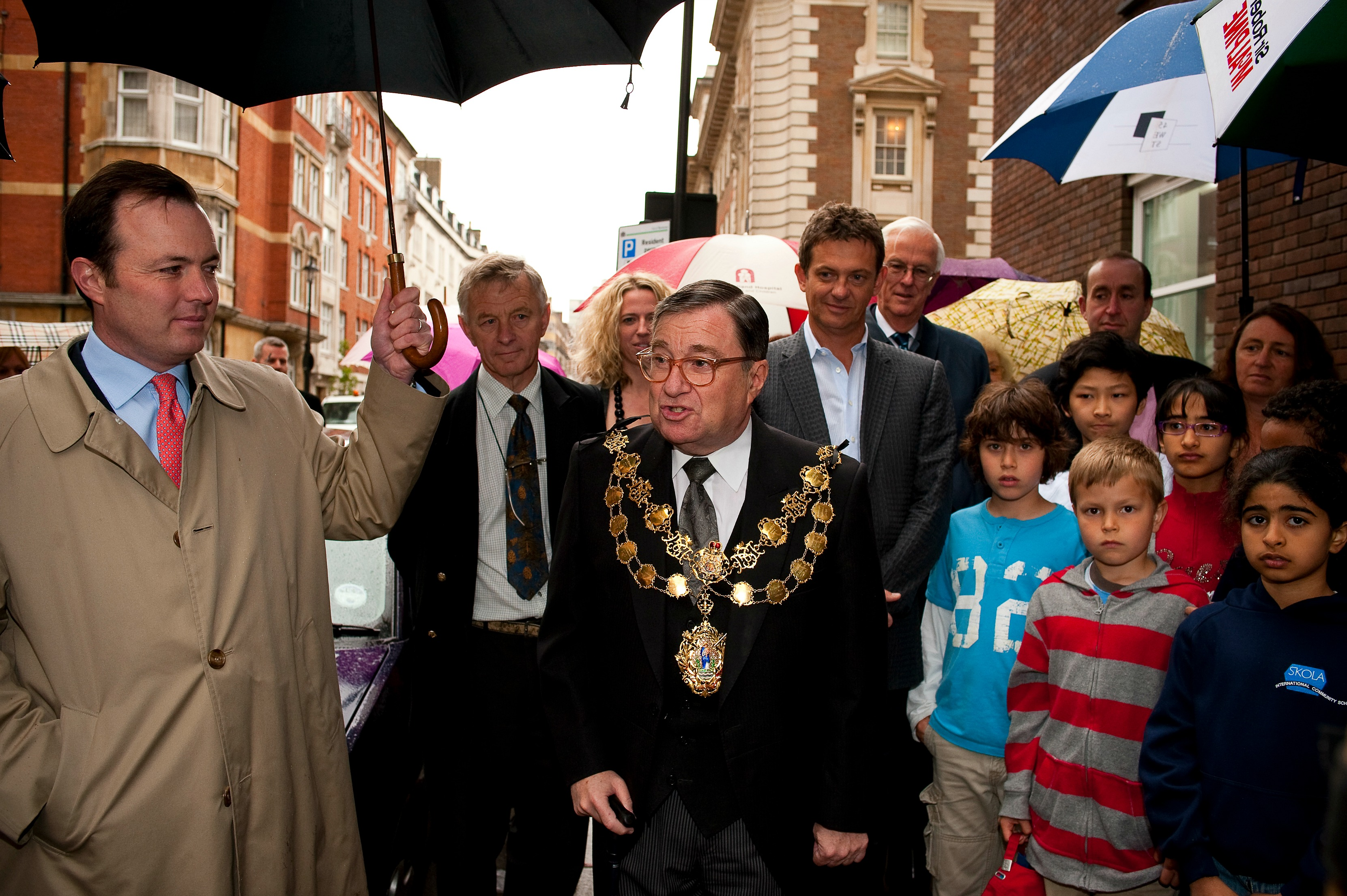
Lord Mayor Cllr Alan Bradley launches W1W Street Tree Planting campaign on Hallam Street W1

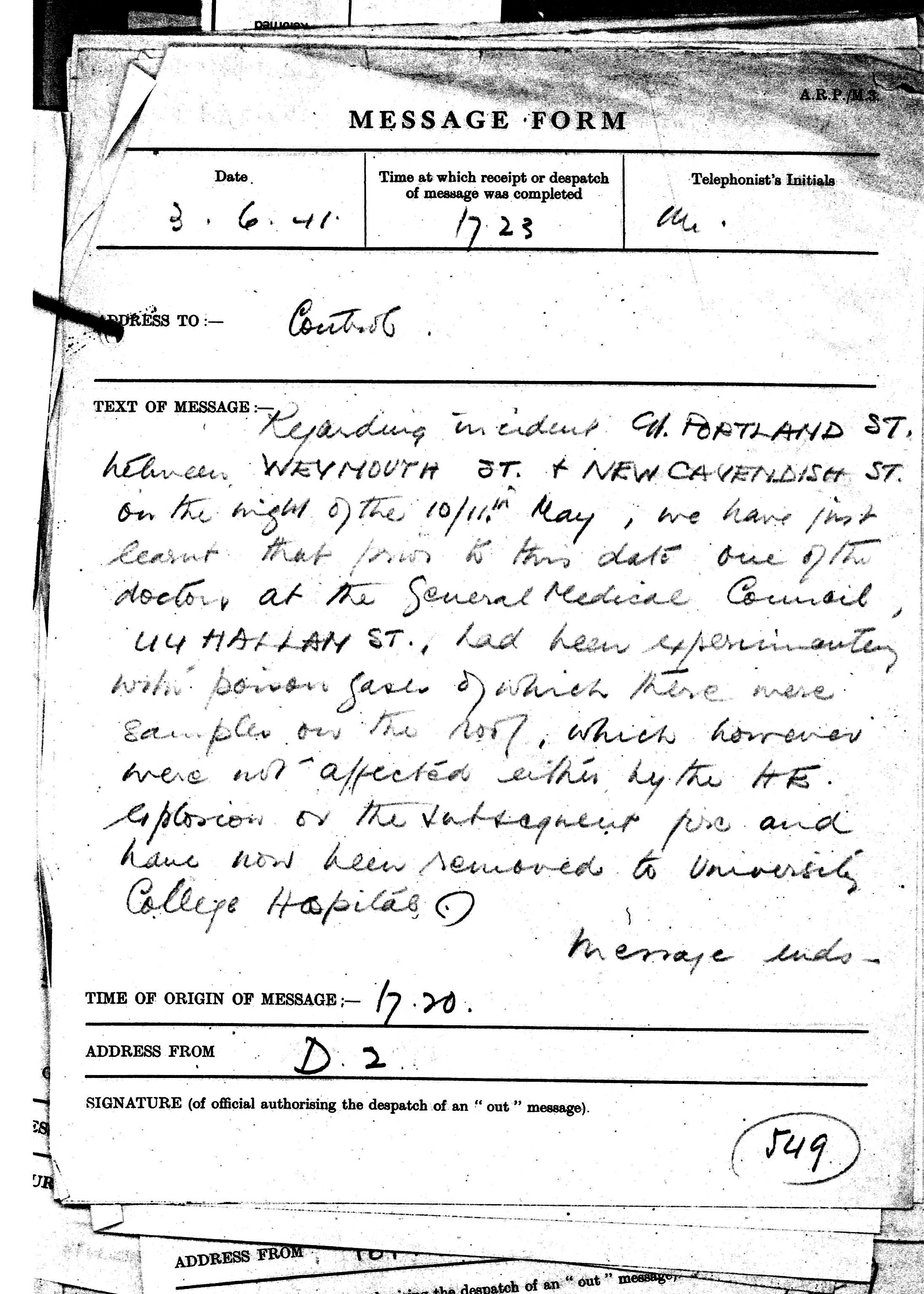
Air Raid Precautions Message regarding bombing incident at 44 Hallam Street on 3 June 1941

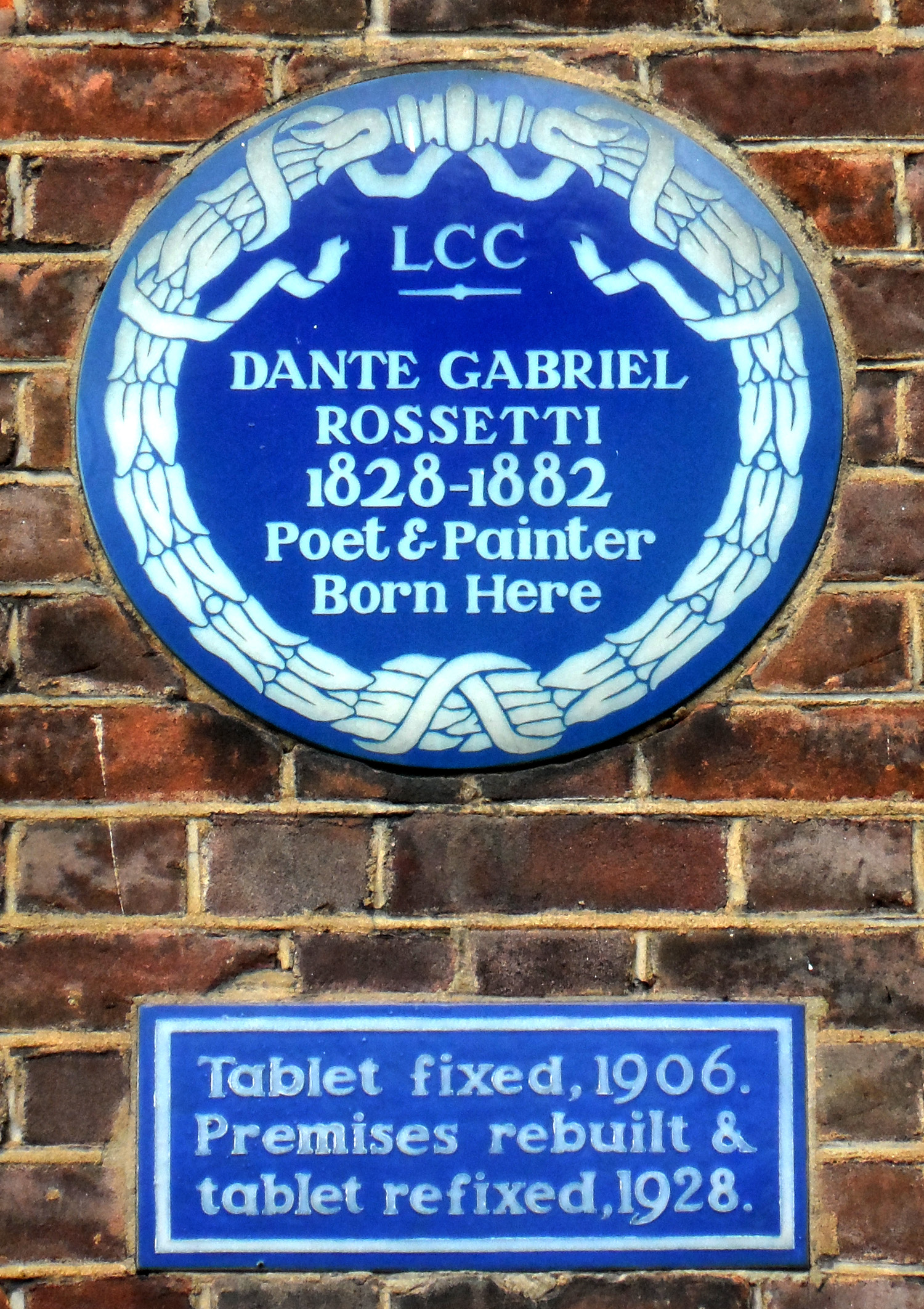
DANTE GABRIEL ROSSETTI 1828-1882 Poet & Painter was born at 110 Hallam Street

== Transport ==
The nearest London Underground stations to Hallam Street are Oxford Circus, Great Portland Street, and Regent's Park tube stations. Buses numbered 88, 18, 27, 30, 205, 189, 3, 12 and 55 stop within a close distance (<5 minutes walk) from Hallam Street.

== See also ==
- List of eponymous roads in London
- UCL Survey of London Volumes on Hallam Street in South East Marylebone
