= Samuel Tak Lee =

Hong Kong property billionaire (1939–2026)

- 李德義
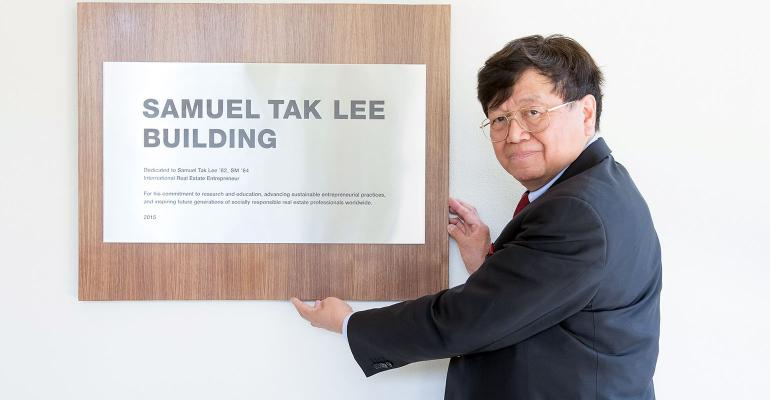
- Lee in 2015
- Born: 1 April 1939; Guangdong, China
- Died: 24 May 2026 (aged 87); London, England
- Education: Diocesan Boys' School, Hong Kong
- Alma mater: Massachusetts Institute of Technology; Harvard Business School
- Occupation: Property developer
- Children: 7, including Samathur Li

Samuel Tak Lee or Lee Tak-Yee (Chinese: 李德義; pinyin: Lǐ Déyì; Jyutping: Lei5 Dak1-ji6; 1 April 1939 – 24 May 2026) was a Hong Kong billionaire property businessman. According to Forbes, he had an estimated net worth of US$4.2 billion at his death.

== Early life ==
Lee was born in Guangdong, China on 1 April 1939. He was educated at Diocesan Boys' School in Mong Kok, before earning bachelor's and master's degrees in civil and environmental engineering from the Massachusetts Institute of Technology in 1964. Lee then earned an MBA from Harvard Business School.

== Career ==
After finishing his studies, Lee returned to Hong Kong to join Prudential Enterprises, the real estate company founded by his father and uncle in 1958. He took control of the entire business from his brother Lee Tak-Yan in 1985. Prudential Enterprises owns the Prudential Hotel in Hong Kong and has significant holdings in Hong Kong, Japan, Switzerland and Singapore. In the UK, he purchased the 14 acre Langham Estate in London's Fitzrovia district in 1994. A real estate portfolio Lee indirectly established in Tokyo in 1999 was eventually sold in 2017 for approximately $1.2 billion.

By 2019, Lee had become the largest shareholder in Shaftesbury PLC, a large London real estate investment trust, with a 26.3% stake. There was persistent media speculation that Lee would eventually bid for control of Shaftesbury. The Times also reported that Lee sued Shaftesbury for £10.4 million in alleged losses over a share placing. His interest in Shaftesbury was subsequently sold at a discount to Capco for $544 million in June 2020.

Lee has been noted for his vigorous defence of his estate's legal rights and business interests. According to Forbes, he had a net worth of $3.6 billion, as of January 2021.

== Philanthropy ==
In 2007, Lee donated US$9 million to Hong Kong's Diocesan Boys' School, of which he was a student between 1951 and 1958. The donation was made to fund residential student growth with a new dormitory block for the school. One of Lee's sons was studying at the school at that time.

Lee donated US$118 million in 2015 to the Massachusetts Institute of Technology, to be used to establish a real estate entrepreneurship lab focused on China. The lab has been researching the impact of poor urban air quality on residents' health, social lives and behaviour.

== Personal life and death ==
Lee was married to Irene Tak Lee, had seven children and lived between Hong Kong and London. He reportedly owned the yachts Pelorus and Kogo. The Lee family reportedly owns a Boeing aircraft and a large car collection.

Lee maintained a low profile and rarely spoke out about his many business dealings. According to media reports and court documents Lee had a colourful personal life.

Samuel's son, Samathur Li Kin-kan, is well-known for his divorce settlement, which the court of Hong Kong awarded his ex-wife HK$1.2 billion.

Lee died at his home in London, on 24 May 2026, at the age of 87.

== Gallery ==
Opening Ceremony of the Samuel Tak Lee Building at Diocesan Boys' School

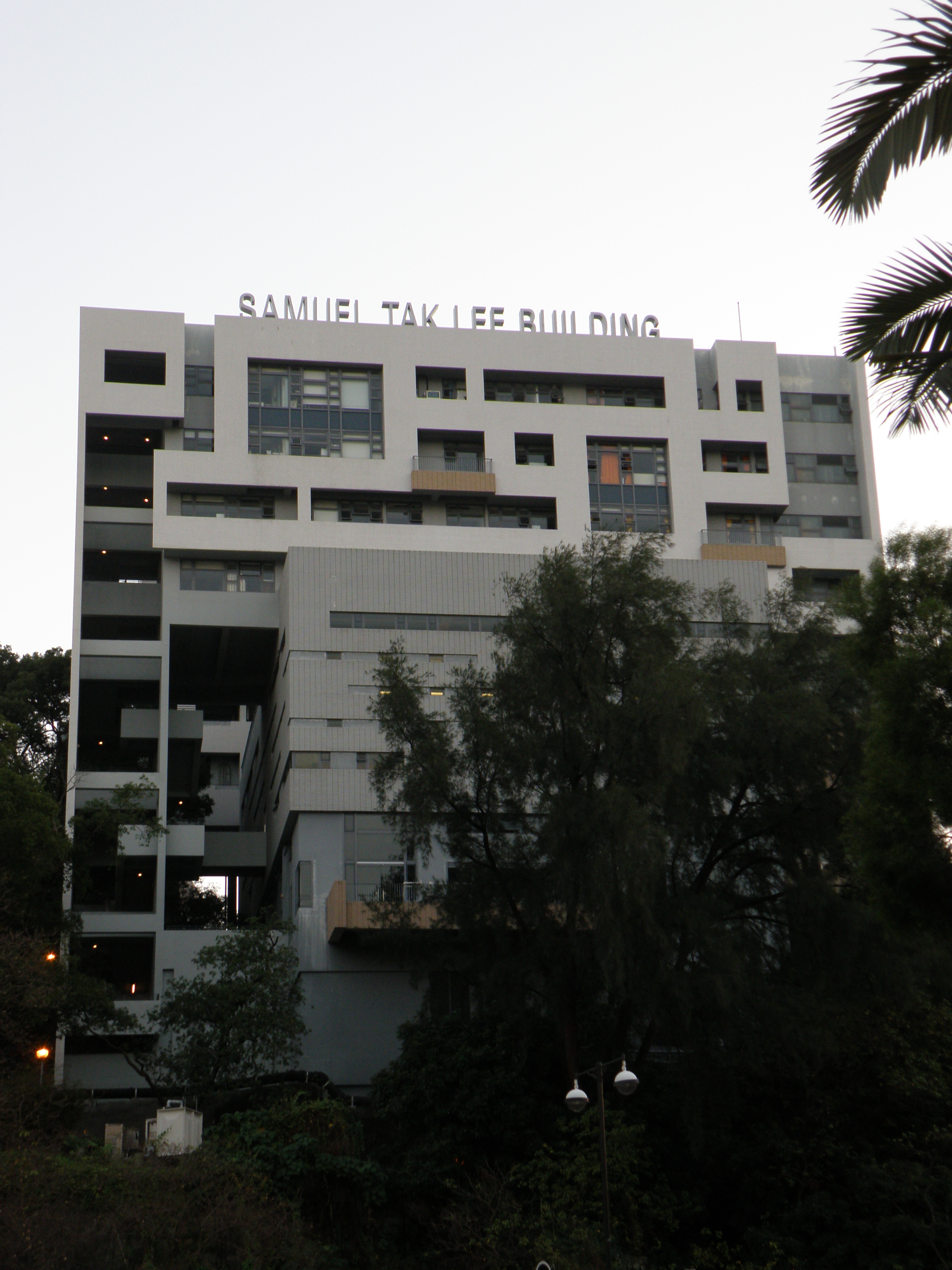
Samuel Tak Lee Building at Diocesan Boys' School

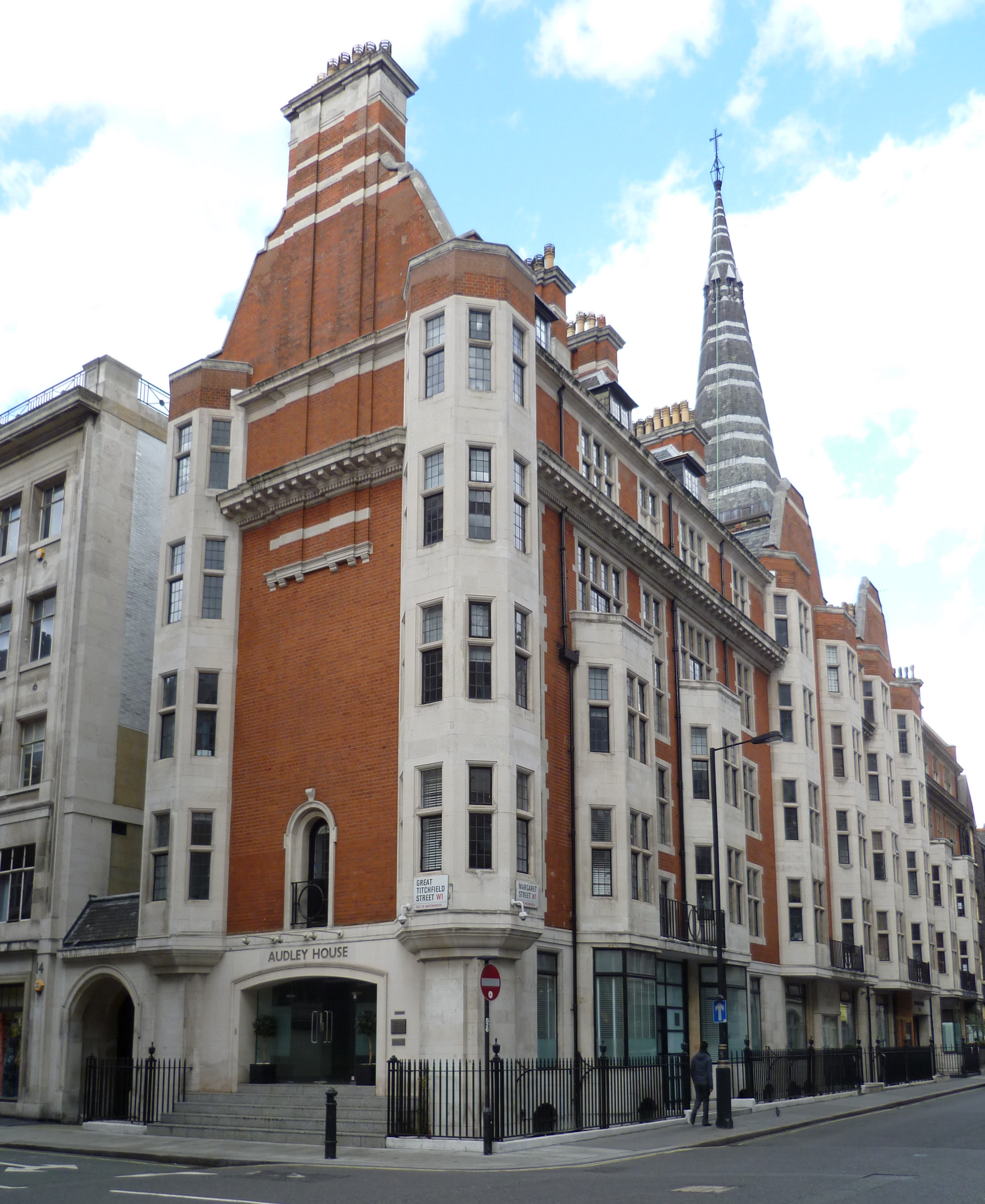
Lee's Langham Estate Offices on Margaret Street, London

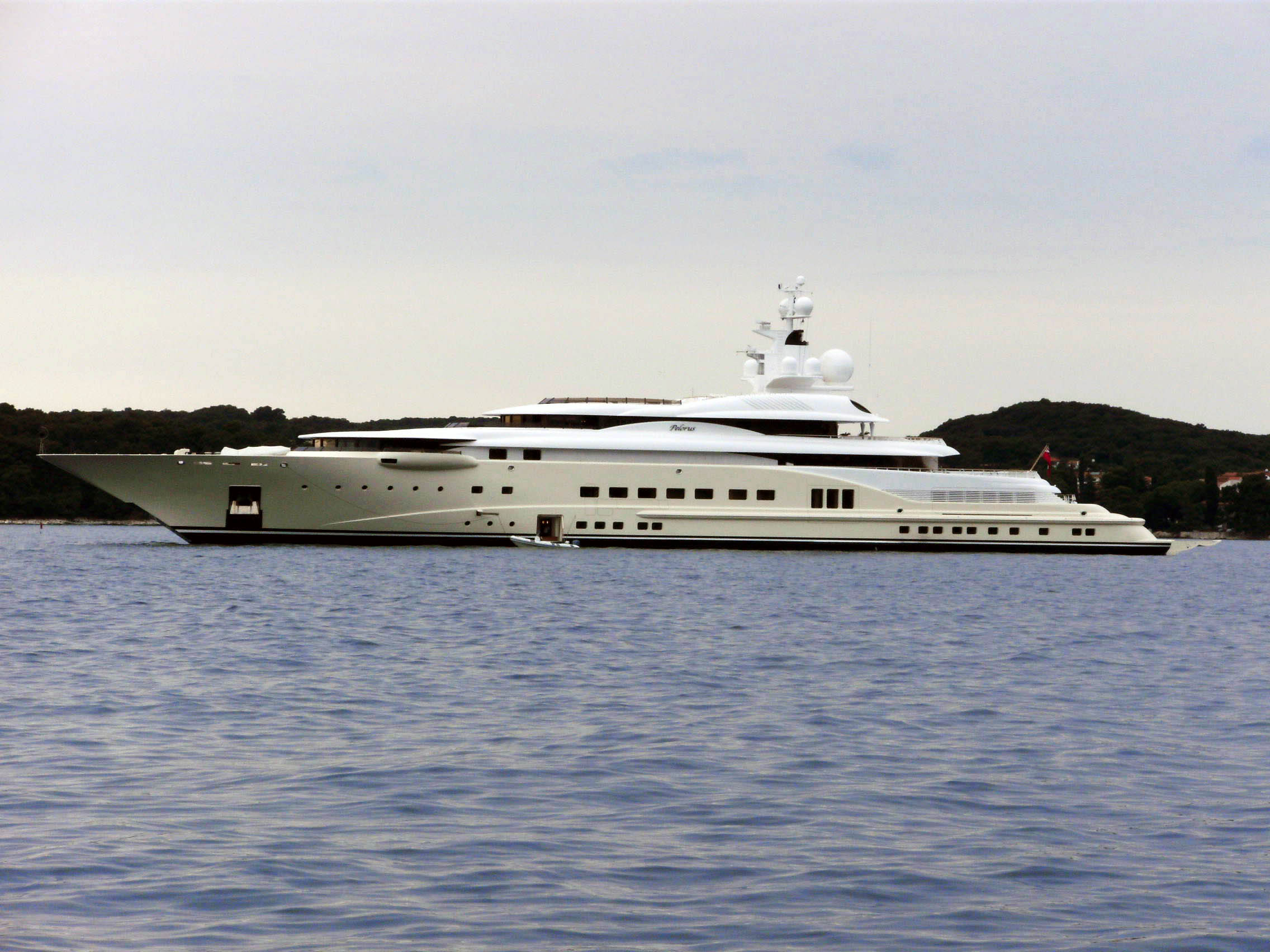
Samuel Tak Lee yacht Pelorus
