= Shaftesbury Capital =

London-based quoted REIT

- Company type: Public limited company
- Traded as: LSE: SHC; FTSE 250 component
- Industry: Property
- Predecessor: Liberty International
- Founded: 1933
- Headquarters: London, United Kingdom
- Area served: London
- Key people: Jonathan Nicholls (Chairman); Ian Hawksworth (CEO)
- Products: Commercial property investment and development
- Revenue: ▲£238.9 million (2025)
- Operating income: ▲£445.8 million (2025)
- Net income: ▲£387.4 million (2025)
- Website: www.shaftesburycapital.com/en/index.html

Shaftesbury Capital, formerly Capital & Counties Properties plc, (Capco) is a United Kingdom-based property investment and development company focused on sites in the West End of London, including Covent Garden, Chinatown London and Carnaby Street, Soho.

It is listed on the London and Johannesburg stock exchanges and is a constituent of the FTSE 250 Index.

== History ==
Capital and Counties was incorporated in 1933 and subsequently established a portfolio of property in London and the Home Counties. It was acquired by Transatlantic Holdings in 1992.

In May 2010, Capital & Counties Properties (Capco) was demerged from Liberty International (formerly Transatlantic Holdings PLC). The company had an interest in Great Capital Partnership (a 50-50 joint venture with Great Portland Estates which invested in commercial property in the Regent Street and Piccadilly areas), but that entity sold its remaining asset in June 2013. The company also had a large interest in the Earl's Court area but sold its interest (co-owned with Transport for London) to Delancey and a Dutch pension fund in November 2019. It acquired REIT status in December 2019.

In June 2020, Capital & Counties Properties agreed to purchase property tycoon Samuel Tak Lee's stake in its rival Shaftesbury. The company acquired a 26.3% stake of Shaftesbury for a reported £436 million.

On 2 March 2023, the company announced the implementation of a proposed merger with British real estate investment trust Shaftesbury PLC. The merger proposals saw Capital & Counties Properties changing its name to Shaftesbury Capital.

== Operations ==
The market value of the company's portfolio, which includes properties in Covent Garden, Seven Dials, Chinatown, Carnaby Street and Soho, was £5.3 billion as of 31 December 2025. The company also has joint ownership of a residential scheme, Lillie Square, along with certain members of the Kwok family, who are major shareholders of Sun Hung Kai Properties.

== See also ==
- List of companies traded on the JSE
- List of companies of South Africa
- Economy of South Africa
