= Bolsover Street =

Street in City of Westminster, United Kingdom

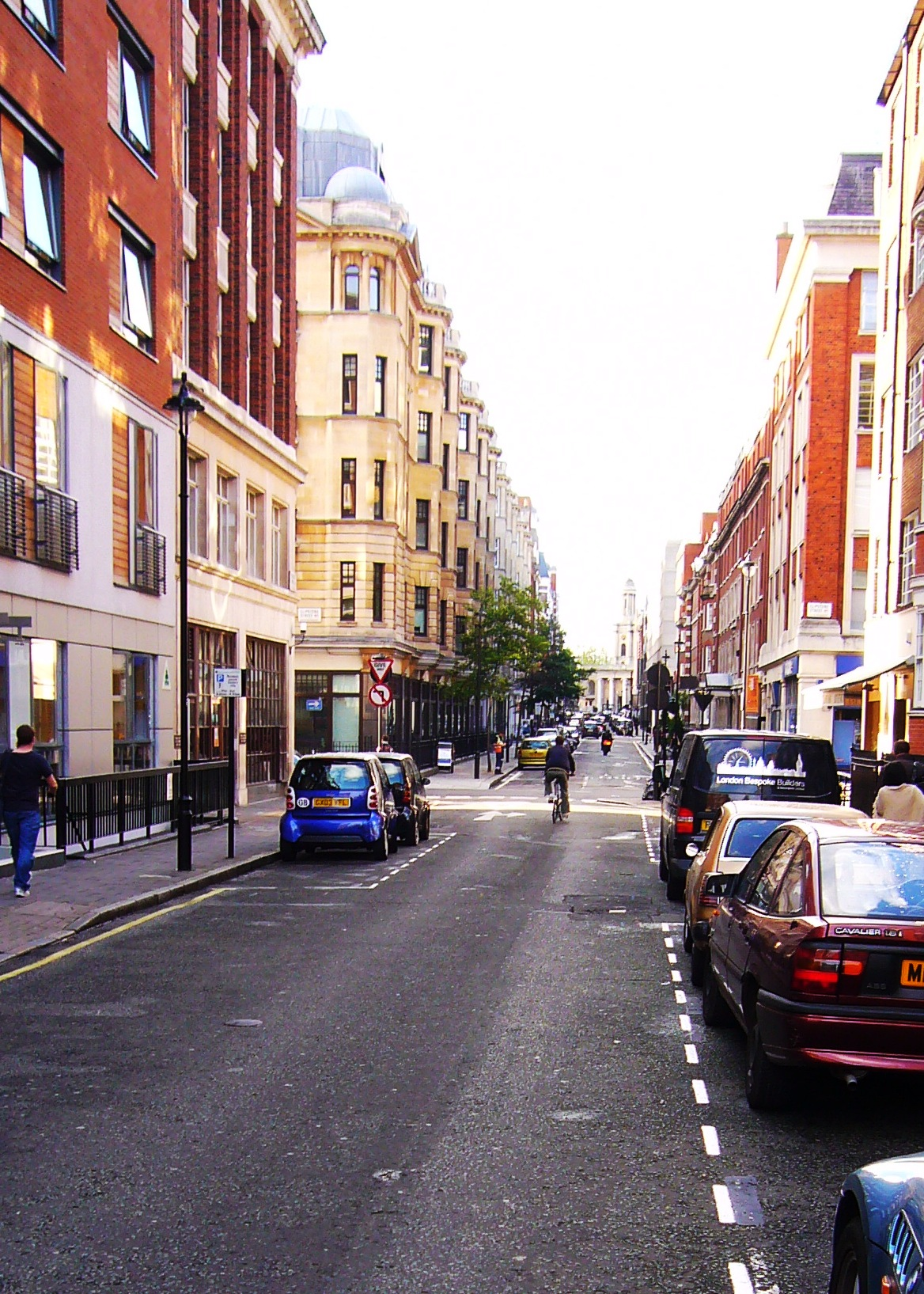
- Bolsover Street looking north towards Holy Trinity Church and Regent's Park
- Former name(s): Norton Street
- Length: 0.2 mi (0.32 km)
- Postal code: W1
- Coordinates: 51°31′19.3″N 0°8′34.6″W
- south end: New Cavendish Street
- north end: Great Portland Street

Bolsover Street is in the Parish of St Marylebone in London's West End. In administrative terms it lies within the City of Westminster's West End Ward and is partly in the Harley Street Conservation Area whilst also sitting on the edges of the Regents Park and East Marylebone Conservation Areas.

The predominant land use on Bolsover Street is office business use, mixed with hotels (and YHA Hostel), medical and professional activity. Numerous communications, new media and broadcast entities are located in offices on the street. Residential presence on the street is strongest at its northern and closest end to Regent's Park and Regent's Place. The Royal National Orthopaedic Hospital has been present on the street since 1907.

== Bolsover Street's history ==
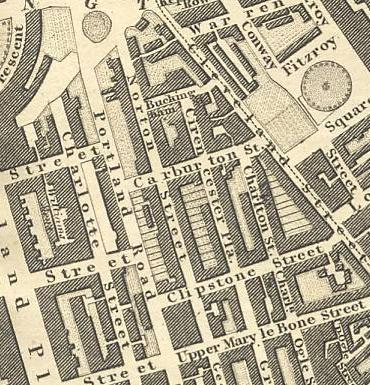
Bolsover Street (then Norton Street) in Greenwood's map of London 1827

Bolsover Street – part of the Portland Estate – was laid out as part of the overall development of this area in the 18th century, originally under the name of Norton Street and Upper Norton Street. Prior to this, Rocque's map of c 1746 shows the site to be mainly open fields with Bilson's farm located to the north and further buildings to the east. Small scale hand-dug quarries (pits) for road construction and ponds were also noted to be in the area at that time.

Later, in the 1870s, it had a change of name – to Bolsover Street – reflecting its links to the Cavendish family and their estate in Derbyshire. Unlike the gradual development of Great Portland Street, this street was almost entirely built up before the end of the 18th century with fairly consistent small terraces. Also around this time, the area was described to be home to many artists' and sculptors' studios. Richard Wilson, the landscape painter, Sir David Wilkie, the Scottish painter and Sir William Chambers, the architect are said to have lived on Bolsover Street.

However, there was significant rebuilding at the beginning of the 20th century. In 1907, the Royal National Orthopaedic Hospital first occupied the northern end of Bolsover Street, when the National Orthopaedic Hospital on Great Portland Street was amalgamated with two other hospitals. In the street as a whole, the rebuilding along the western side was mostly related to the redevelopment along Great Portland Street, where the large Edwardian buildings were constructed to take up the whole width of the block with their backs facing on to Bolsover Street. There was also much rebuilding along the eastern side, with several of the terraced houses from the first development demolished in small groups and built over with larger buildings.

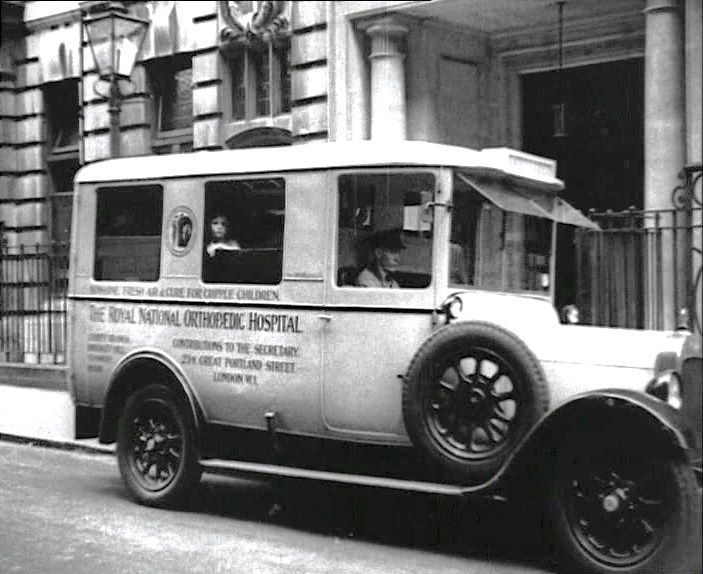
The RNOH on Bolsover Street in circa 1930

As such, much about Bolsover Street was already altered from its original form and character even before The Blitz, in which some buildings were only superficially damaged but others were damaged beyond repair. This destruction necessarily led to a fair amount of reconstruction in the second half of the 20th century. Another factor in Bolsover Street's changing face in the last century has been the continued growth and development of the Royal National Orthopaedic Hospital. The most recent instance of this has been the opening of the new central London Outpatient Assessment Centre and the associated residential development. The centre maintains the hospital's original Outpatients’ Hall with murals by Nan West, a student of the Slade School, The murals cover some 90 square metres and are reminiscent of the pre-Raphaelites. These murals were restored in 1996, and were listed Grade II in 1998 as being of special historic interest This latest initiative has brought some of the activity and visual interest over from the neighbouring streets to enliven Bolsover Street for the 21st century.

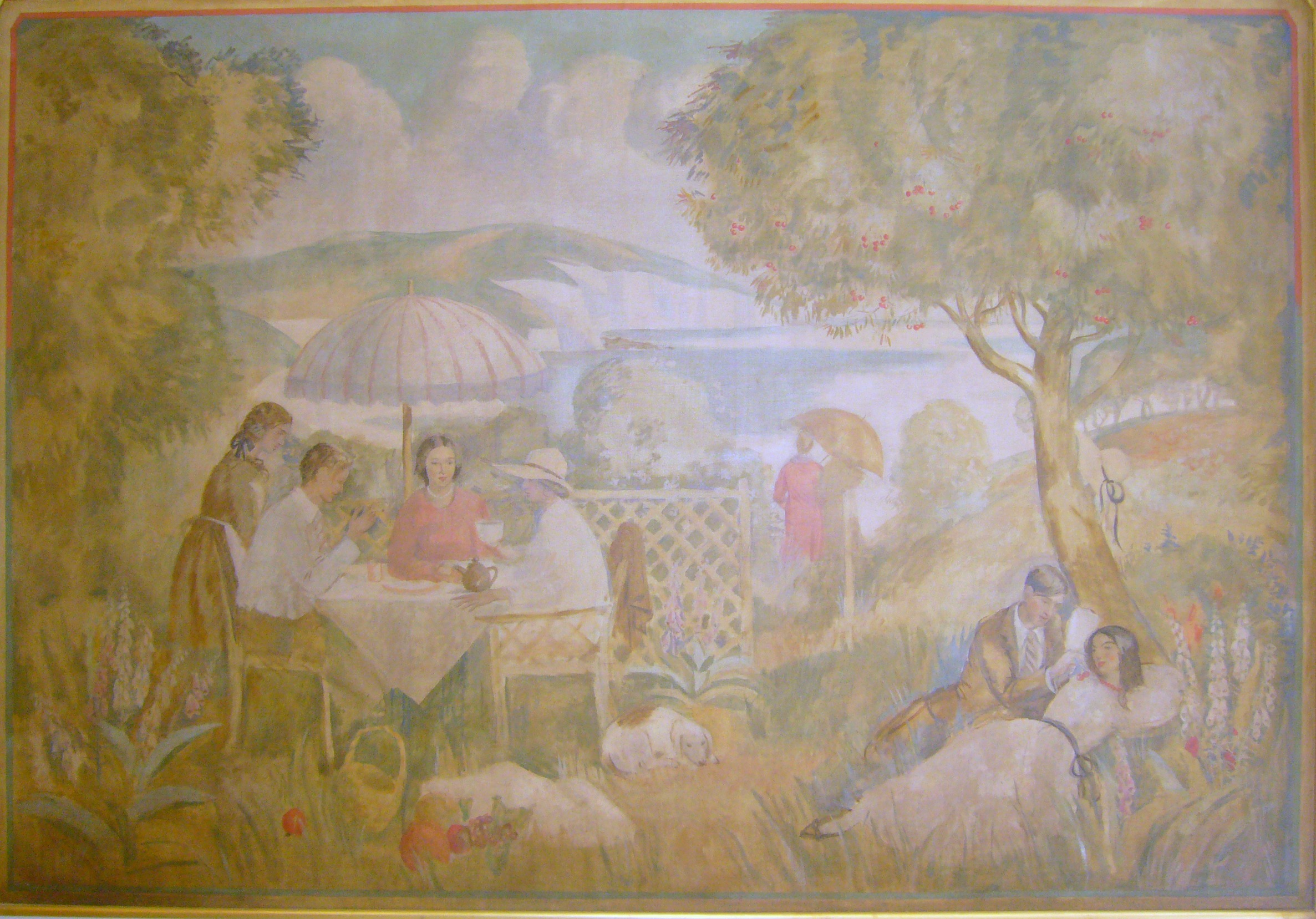
Listed Nan West Mural on Bolsover Street from 1927

Bolsover Street's streetscape is a mix of Edwardian institutional and mansion-block style buildings, modern offices and other commercial buildings and a large post-war hotel building and residential buildings. Its buildings are typically presented in red, red/brown or stock brickwork with stone dressings to the windows, entrances and cornice lines. Its buildings are mostly 6–9 storeys high with mansard roofs and one or two levels of dormer windows. The predominant land use on Bolsover Street is office business use, hotels mixed with medical and professional activity. Numerous communications, new media and broadcast entities are located on the street.

Recent development activity is leading to a growing residential presence especially at the north end of Bolsover Street. Community efforts have successfully led to trees lining the length of Bolsover Street. Alan Titchmarsh, celebrity broadcaster and gardening expert, planted an elm tree to mark the arrival of 48 new trees in Bolsover Street in April 2011.

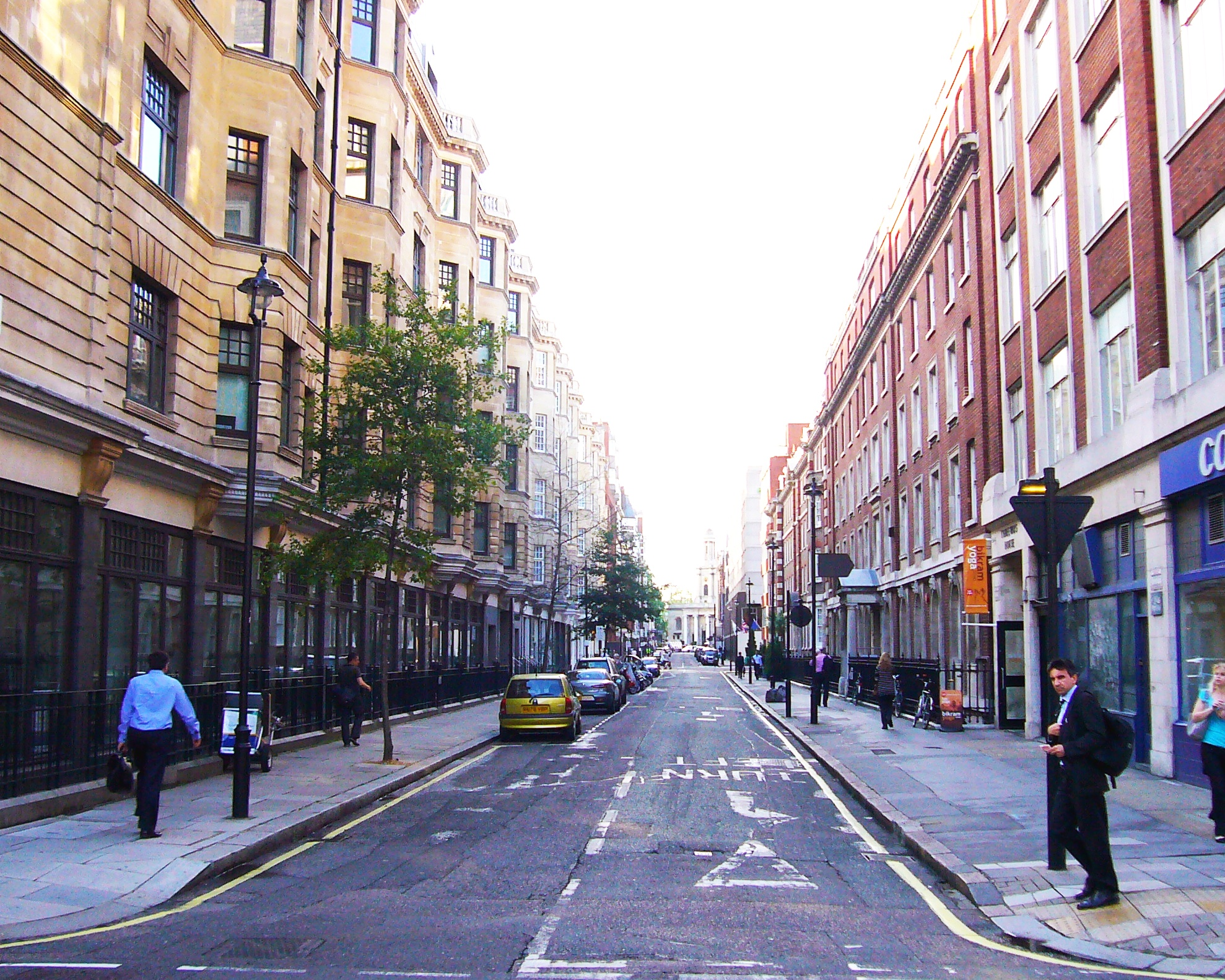
Bolsover Street looking north from Clipstone Street

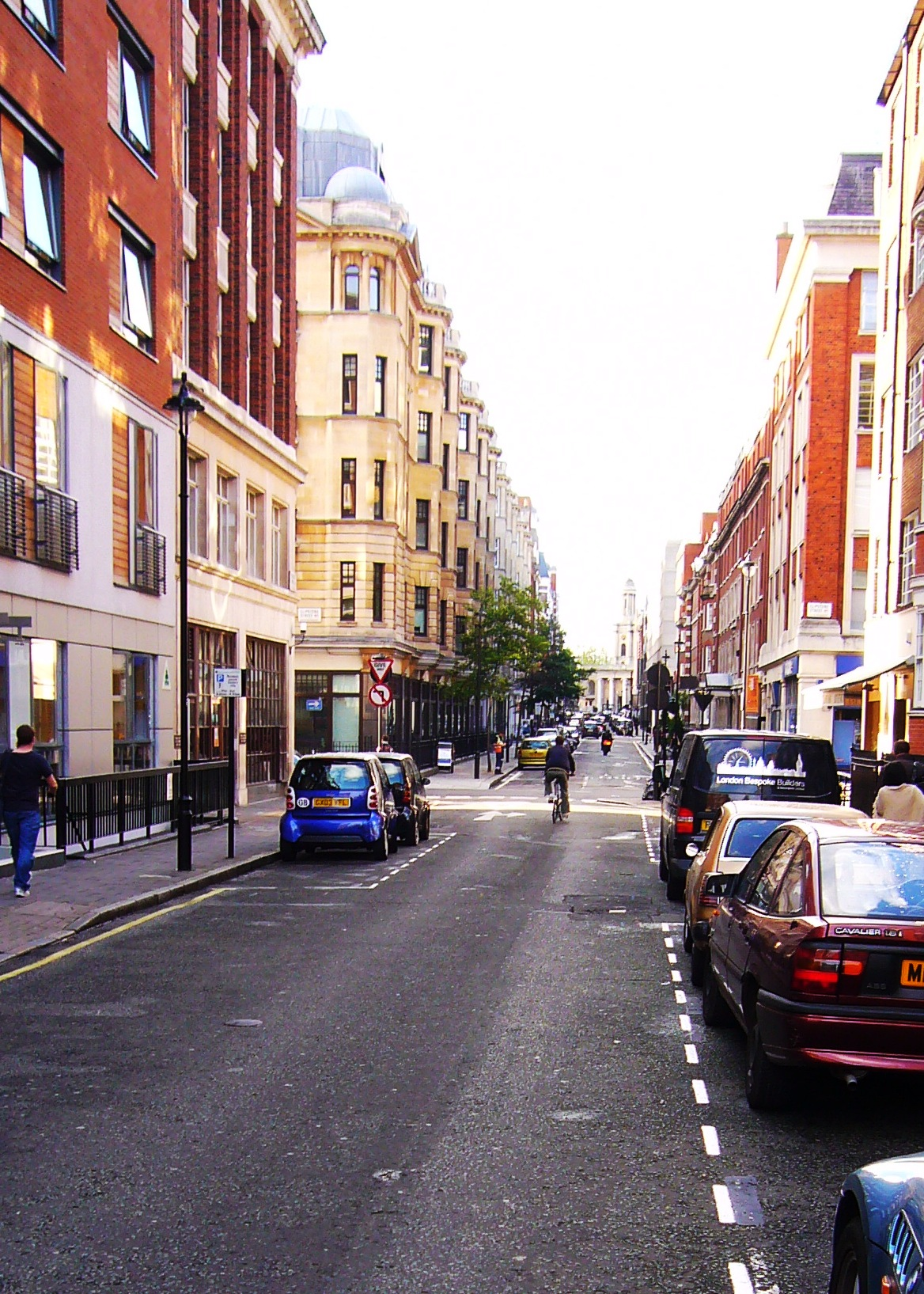
Bolsover Street looking north from New Cavendish Street

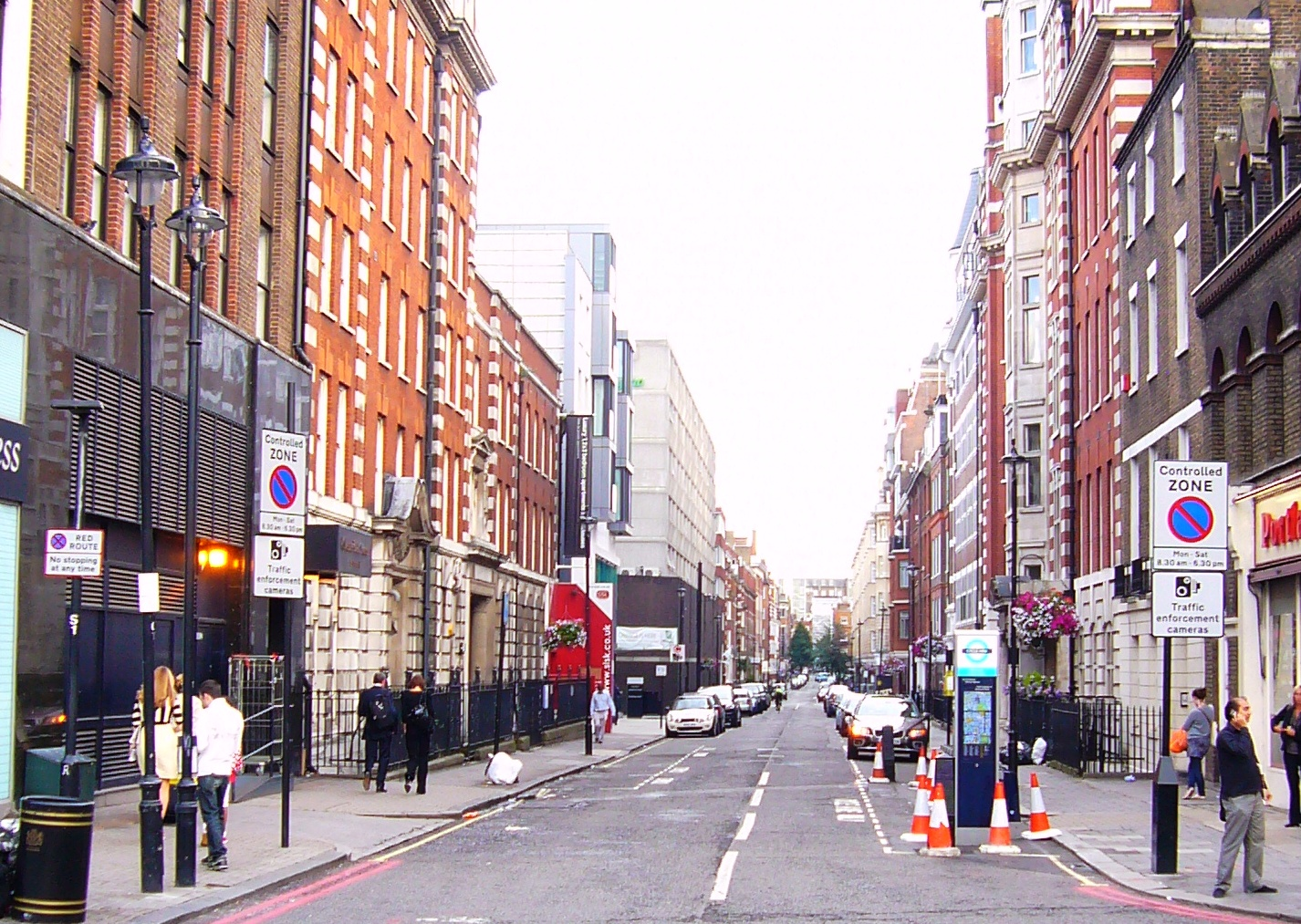
Bolsover Street looking south from GPS Tube Station

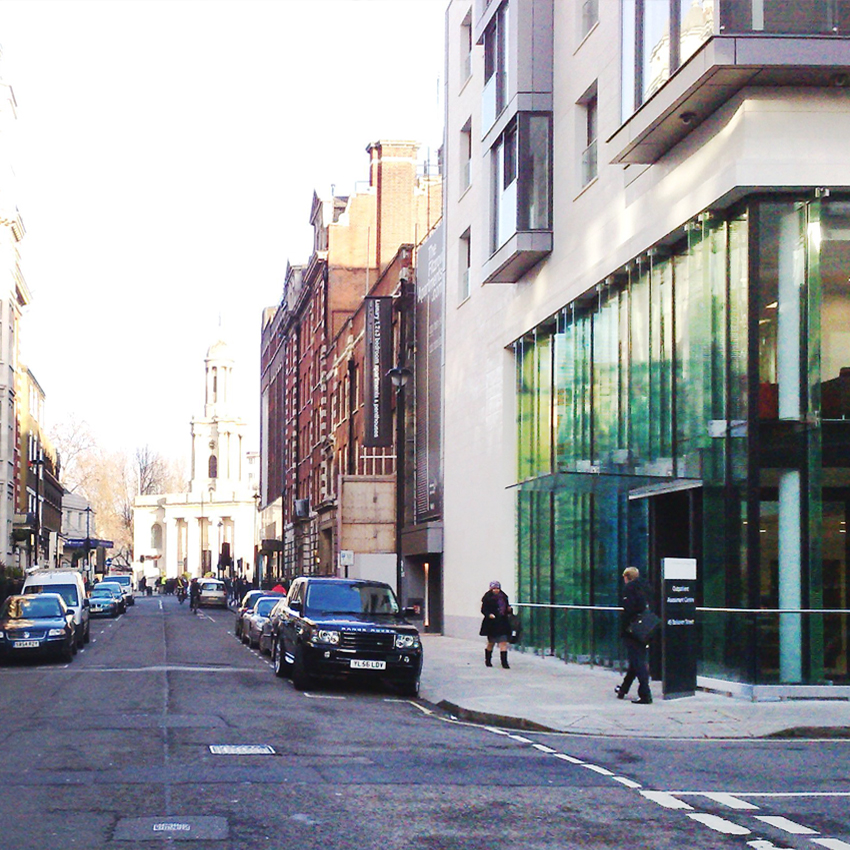
View of the new RNOH on Bolsover Street

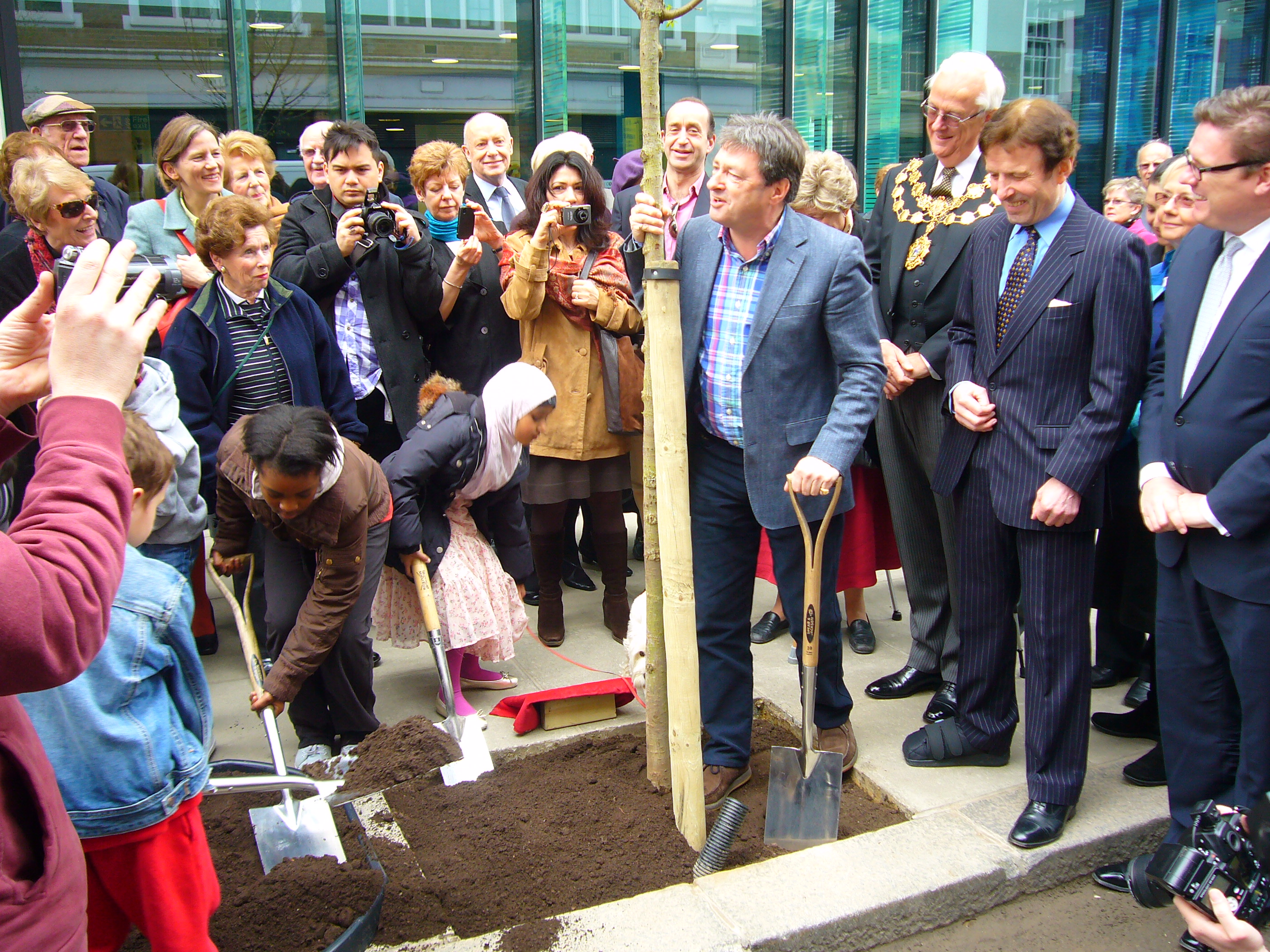
Alan Titchmarsh plants the last of 48 new trees in Bolsover Street in 2011

== Bolsover Street and public transport ==
Local London Underground stations for Bolsover Street are in order of proximity Great Portland Street, Regent's Park, Warren Street, and Oxford Circus. Buses numbered 88, 18, 27, 30, 205, 189, 3, 12 and 55 stop within a close distance (<5 minutes walk) from Bolsover Street. A large underground parking facility is located close by in Clipstone Mews.

== Sources ==
- Alan Baxter & Associates LLP, London
- Westminster City Council Archive Centre, London
- Rocque, J, 1746 ‘A Plan of the Cities of London Westminster and Southwark with contiguous buildings from an actual survey’ by John Rocque, reproduced in Margart, H, 1971 ‘A plan of the Cities of London Westminster and Southwark’ by John Rocque, 1746, Margary in assoc Guildhall Library, Kent
- R. Horwood, 1799, Plan of the cities of London and Westminster, the Borough of Southwark, and parts adjoining, shewing every house
- British Library Crace Collection London Map Archive
- 1834 Topographical survey of the Borough of St. Marylebone
- Westminster City Council Conservation Area Audits
- Westminster City Council Harley Street Conservation Area Audit 2008
- NHS RNOH Bolsover Street Project Web Site
- Portland Village Amenity Web Site
- W1W Street Tree Planting Initiative for Marylebone - Phase IV for Bolsover Street
- 1929 British Pathe newsreel footage regarding the National Othopedic Hospital on Bolsover Street
