= Shaftesbury PLC =

London-based quoted REIT

- Company type: Public
- Traded as: LSE: SHB; FTSE 250 component
- Industry: Real estate
- Founded: 1986
- Headquarters: London, United Kingdom
- Key people: Jonathan Nicholls, Chairman; Brian Bickell, CEO; Simon Quayle, Property Director; Tom Welton, Property Director; Chris Ward, Finance Director
- Products: London West End restaurants, leisure and retail
- Revenue: ▲£123.1 million (2022)
- Operating income: ▲£147.8 million (2022)
- Net income: ▲£119.1 million (2022)
- Website: www.shaftesbury.co.uk

Shaftesbury PLC was a British real estate investment trust which invested exclusively in the heart of London's West End. It was headquartered in London and was listed on the London Stock Exchange until it merged with Capital & Counties Properties to form Shaftesbury Capital in March 2023.

== History ==
Shaftesbury was founded in 1986 as a private company by the Levy family, with an initial injection of £10 million. The family had a long history in UK real estate, having founded the London-based estate agency DE & J Levy, and co-founded the major post-war development company The Stock Conversion and Investment Trust, in the 1940s.

The company's first property acquisition was a group of 26 buildings in London's Chinatown.

The company secured a listing on the main market of the London Stock Exchange in October 1987 when it was valued at £26 million. In its early years, the company had a UK-wide investment strategy but, following the UK real estate recession of 1990 to 1993, it focussed its investment activity solely in London's West End.

On 2 March 2023, the company announced the implementation of a proposed merger with Capital & Counties Properties. The merger proposals saw Capital & Counties Properties changing its name to Shaftesbury Capital.

== Operations ==
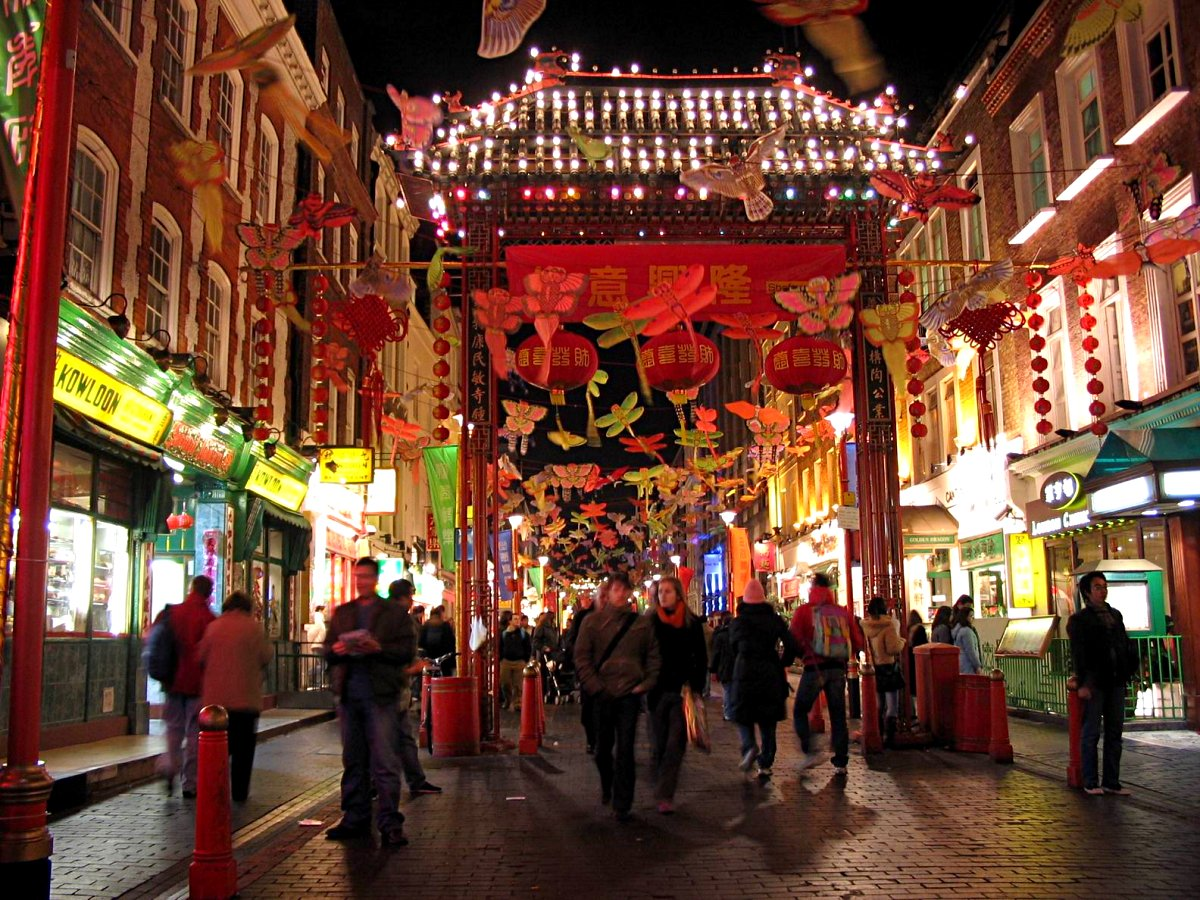
Chinatown in London where the company owns over 100 buildings

Shaftesbury's portfolio extended to nearly 15 acres in London's West End. It comprised nearly 600 buildings, located close to the West End's major visitor attractions, and mainly clustered in Carnaby Street, Seven Dials and Chinatown, together with substantial ownerships in east and west Covent Garden, Soho and Charlotte Street. In addition, the company has a 50% interest in a further 1.9 acres in Covent Garden, held in its Longmartin joint venture. In late 2017, the company increased its investment in the Seven Dials, London area.

The company's property interests were independently-valued at £3.1 billion at 30 September 2022.
