= Maltby Street Market =

Weekly street market Bermondsey, South London

Coordinates: 51.4996°N 0.0762°W

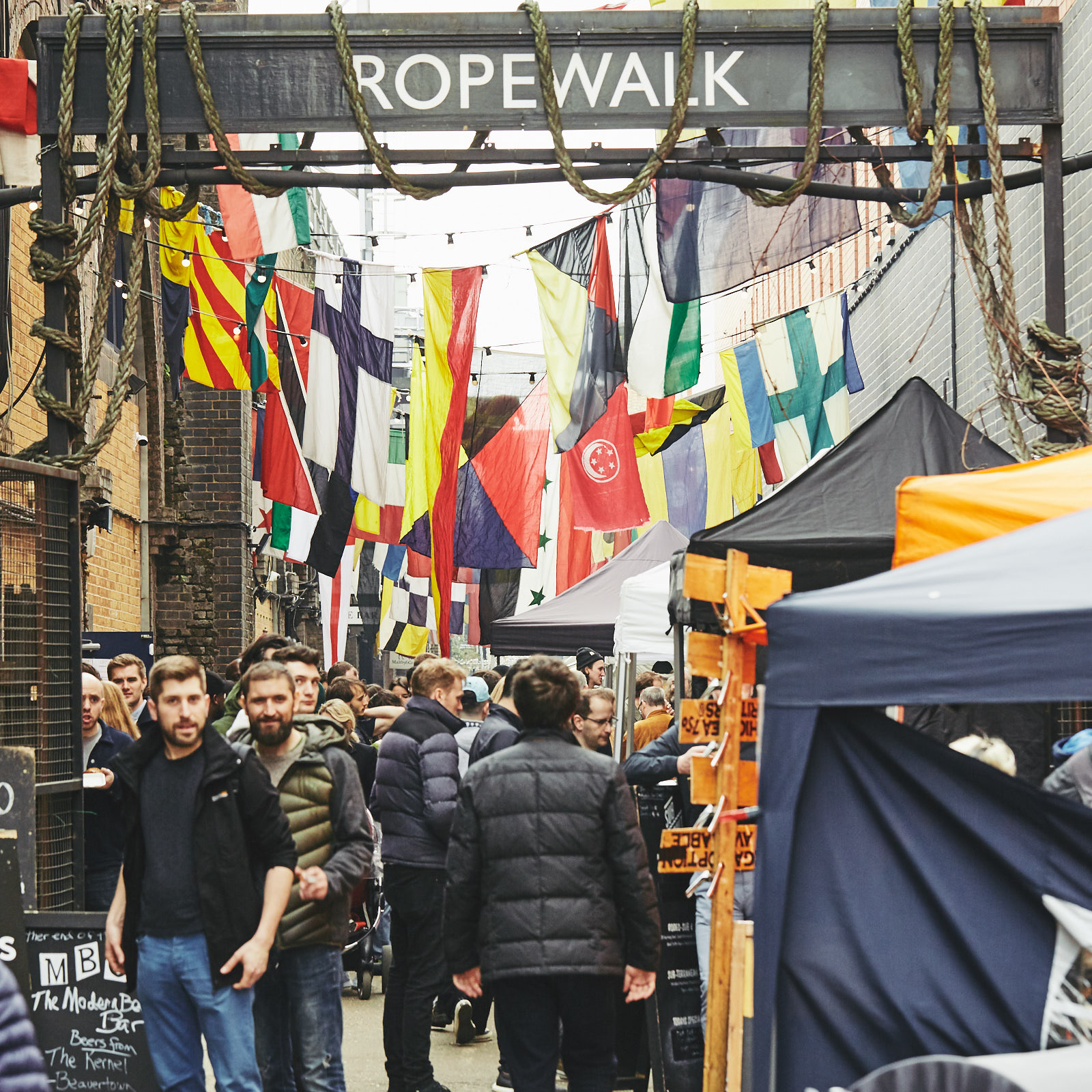
The Ropewalk gate of Maltby Street Market

Maltby Street Market is a weekly street-food and provisions market in Bermondsey, south London, England. The market is located on a street of the same name near Tower Bridge in the old Horselydown parish of Bermondsey.

As a riparian borough adjacent to Shad Thames and the London Docks, Bermondsey has had a long heritage of involvement in the merchant marine and allied trades. The now enclosed River Neckinger passes a few yards from the southern end of the market walk where a diverted conduit of the river is remembered in the name of Millstream road. Maltby Street itself was the approximate site of a ropewalk belonging to Robert Rich and the name has carried over, in the name of the market yard, to the present day.

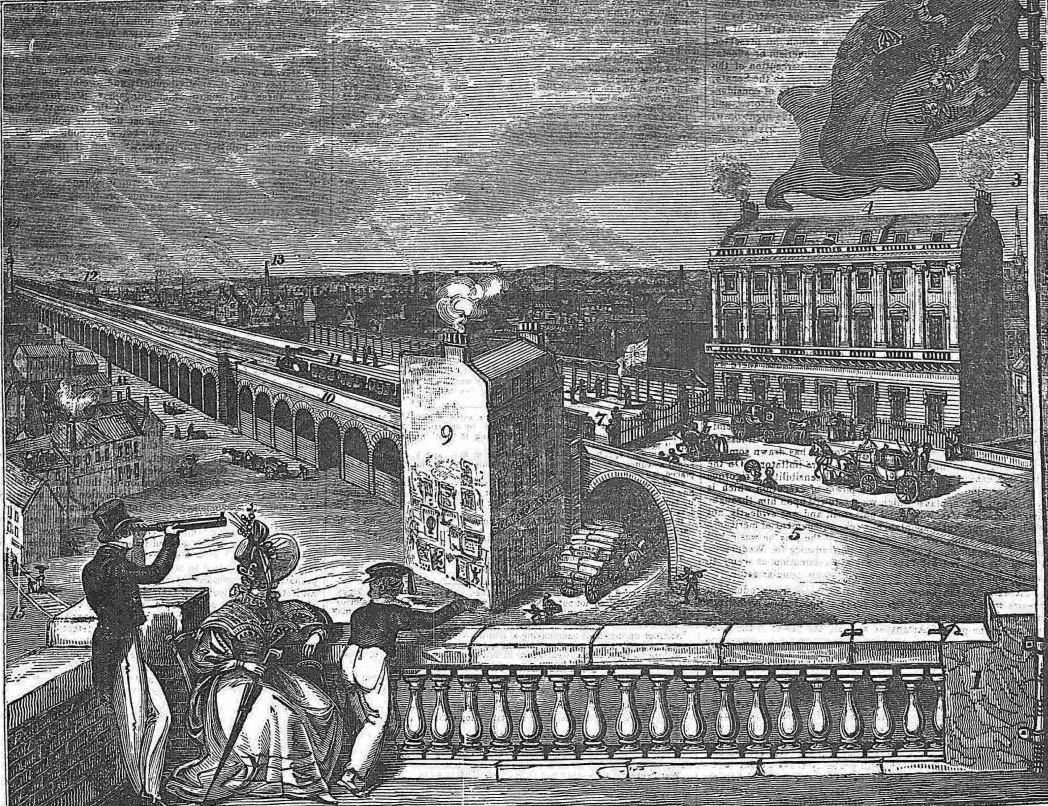
The viaduct at London Bridge railway station in 1836

== Local area ==
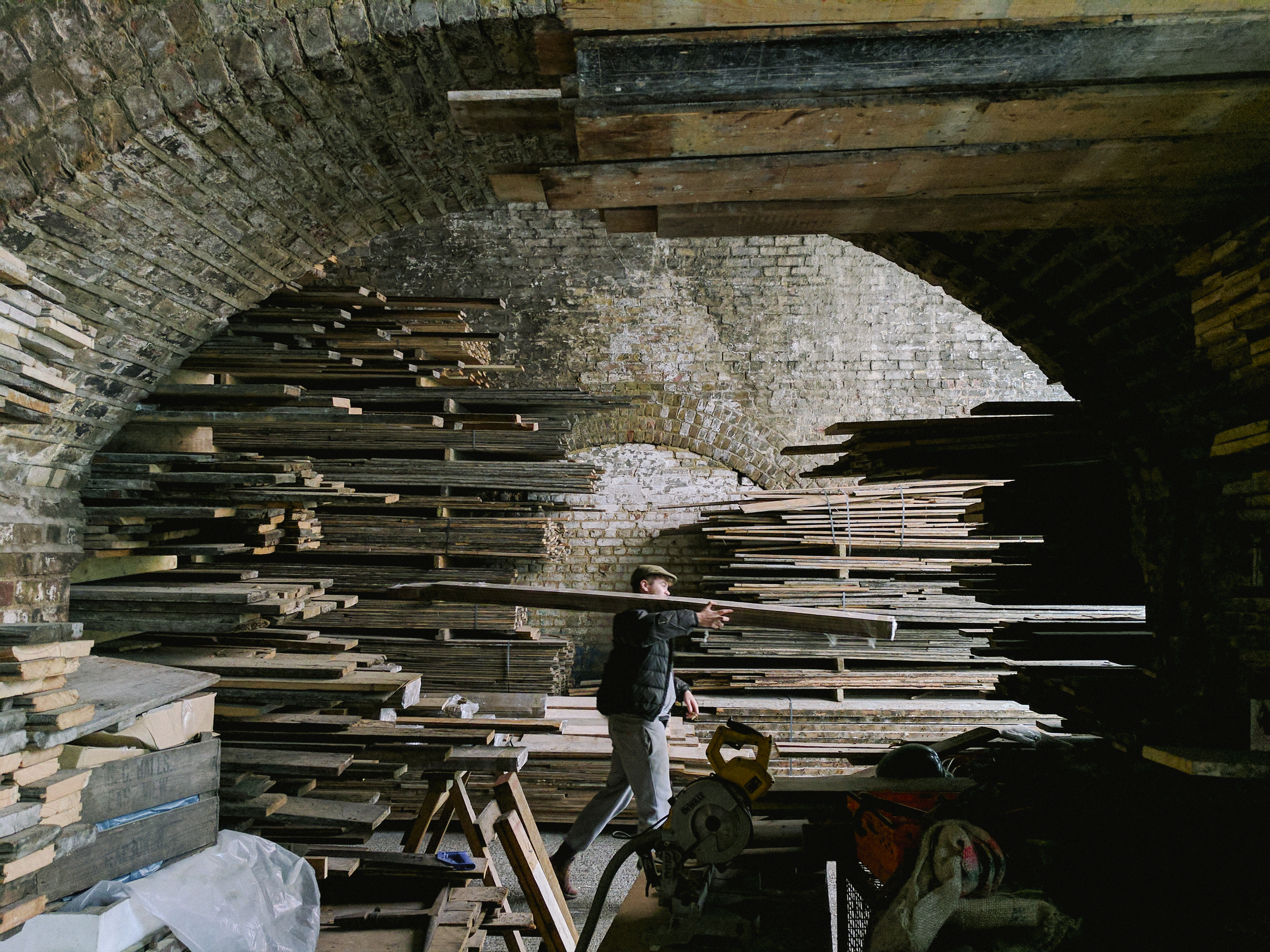
LASSCO Ropewalk Timber Yard on Maltby Street.

The area around Maltby Street has historically been constituted of a mixture of workers’ housing, light industrial units, warehouses and small manufactories and was the traditional location of leather tanneries and rope walks for the making of rigging and cable for shipping in the age of sail. Within half a mile of Maltby Street Market there are a number of built relics of London's industrial heritage. These include Bevington & Sons Neckinger Mills, the Sarsons vinegar factory of 1814, The Leathersellers College of 1909, Hepburn and Gale's tannery complex, the Alaska buildings and the Anchor Brewery at Tower Bridge among many others.

The railway arches which run the length of the market were built between 1836 and 1839 for the London and Greenwich Railway, the capital's first steam railway and the earliest elevated railway in the world. The line still carries Southeastern trains at regular intervals From London Bridge to Greenwich and the wider South East.

After the removal of Islington's Caledonian Market to Bermondsey Square in 1950 many of the small warehouses and railway arches around Maltby Street were taken up by antiques and furniture dealers. Subsequently, the rezoning of the area to permit the construction new dwellings has led to the dispersal and replacement of these small warehouses with housing stock and an alteration of the character of the area giving it a mixed-residential neighbourhood feel.

The market itself occupies a narrow private yard belonging to the London Architectural Salvage and Supply Co (LASSCO), a long established salvage and reclamation company specialising in reclaimed floorboards. The space was first offered as a site for the fledgling food market in 2009 as a way of utilising the salvage yard on quiet weekends. The Market now runs the length of the LASSCO yard every weekend with the firm packing away its reclaimed timber and machinery on Friday to make way for the market stalls.

== History ==
Maltby Street Market developed from a group of Borough Market traders who had opened storage facilities in railway arches around Maltby Street, about a mile from the market. In 2009 Monmouth Coffee Company started to open their arch to sell coffee on Saturdays and other traders followed their example. In 2011 seven traders were evicted from Borough Market for trading at a competing venue. In turn the traders criticised poor facilities at the market and a move to selling takeaway food. Initially, nine traders moved the mile from Borough High Street to Maltby Street. The market has changed and developed since then and now includes up to 30 traders at any one time with a steady cycle of new traders coming and going as decided by the constituted Market authorities. Many of the original 'rogue traders' who first parted ways with Borough Market have subsequently moved yet further down the railway line to Spa Terminus and created a food production and distribution centre on that site.

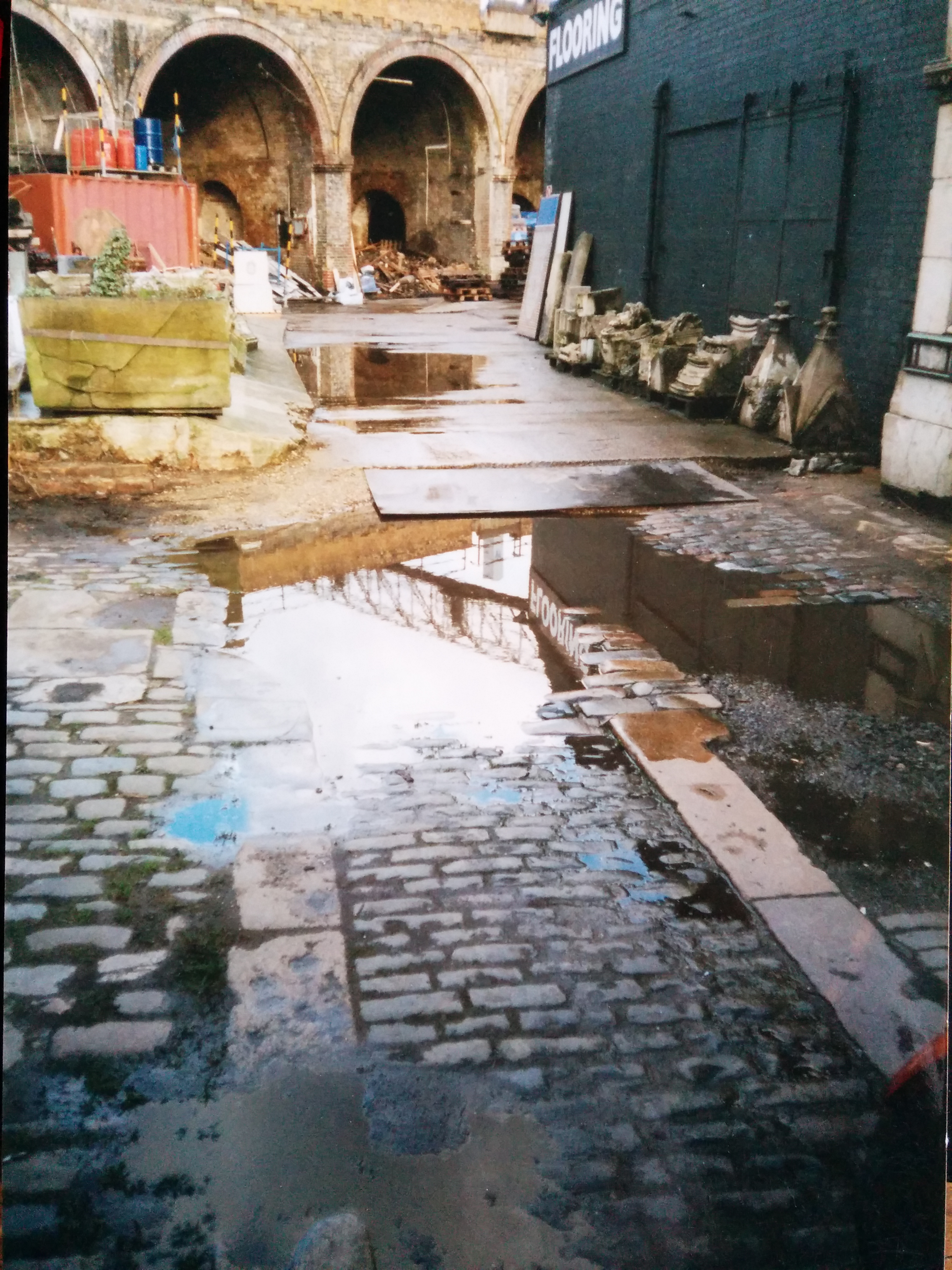
Rope Walk yard on Maltby Street in 1997, the current site of the market.

The market is made up of various street food vendors. It has been described by several publications.

== Information ==
The market is open every Saturday (10am–5pm) and on Sundays (11am–4pm) with certain concessions trading into the evening. It begins at the Tanner Street end of Maltby Street and extends along a narrow former rope-walk to Millstream Road with stalls either side of the walk and inside the adjacent railway arches. As well as movable stalls and barrows there are three permanent concessions offering food and drink from Wednesday to Sunday and a French bakery oven-side shop selling cakes and pastries throughout the week.
