= E for Ecstasy =

1993 non-fiction book by Nicholas Saunders

- Author: Nicholas Saunders
- Subject: MDMA
- Publisher: Octavo
- Publication date: May 1993
- Pages: 320 pp.
- ISBN: 0-9501628-8-4

E for Ecstasy is a book written by Nicholas Saunders and published in May 1993. The book describes in detail the psychoactive substance MDMA (ecstasy), the people that use it and the law concerning it, all enhanced through the lens of the author's personal experience.

Subsequent revised versions were renamed Ecstasy and the Dance Culture (1995) and Ecstasy Reconsidered (1997). The book is available online for free.

The book was banned in Australia in 1994.

== See also ==
- List of psychedelic literature
