= Neal's Yard Dairy =

UK cheese seller

Coordinates: 51.51424°N 0.12619°W

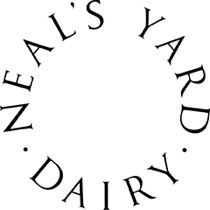

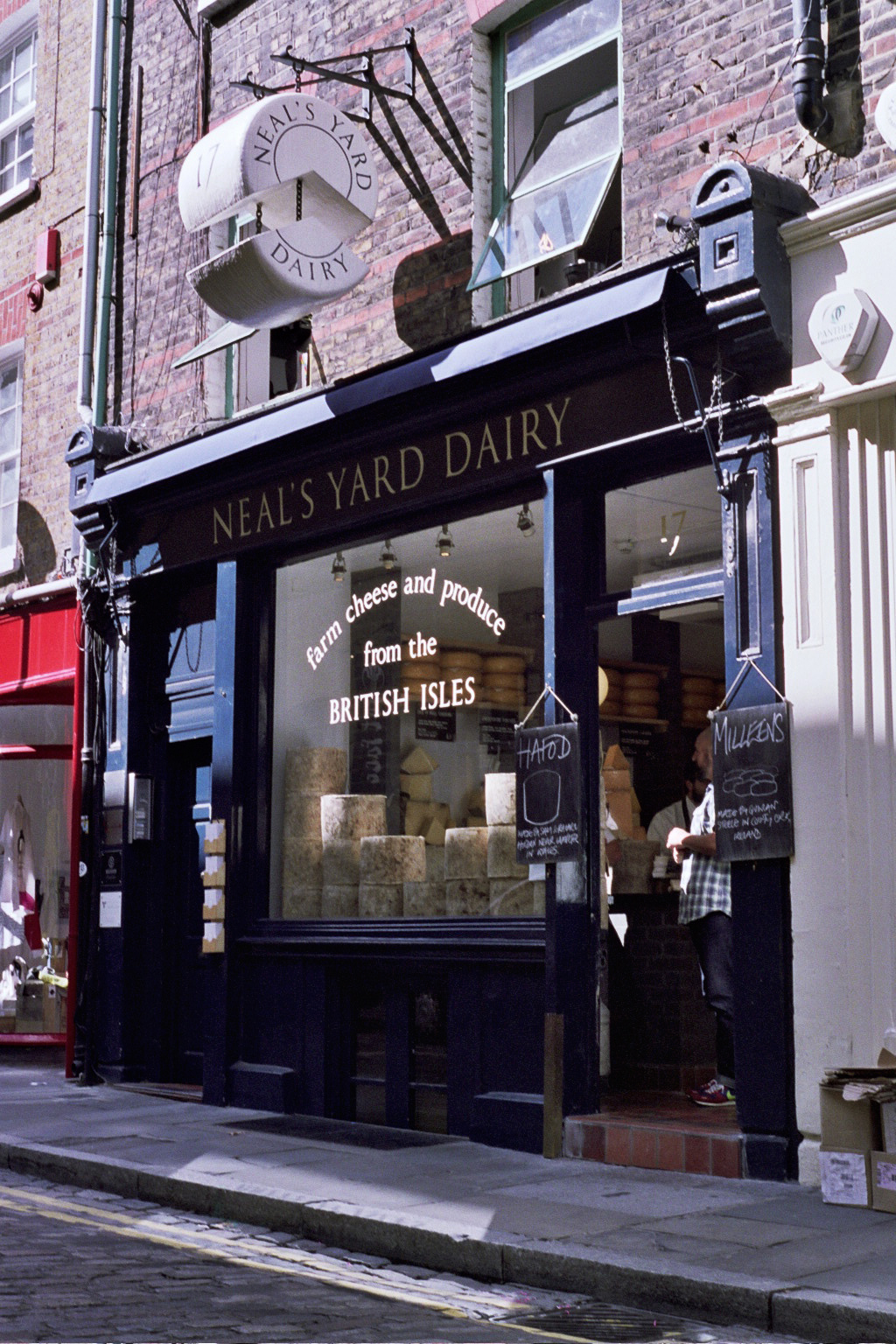
- Storefront in Shorts Gardens, Covent Garden
- Company type: Private
- Industry: Dairy products
- Founded: 1979; 47 years ago in Neal's Yard, Covent Garden, London, England
- Founders: Nicholas Saunders; Randolph Hodgson
- Headquarters: Arch 6, Apollo Business Park; St James's Road, Bermondsey, London
- Number of locations: 4 (2022)
- Website: www.nealsyarddairy.co.uk

Neal's Yard Dairy is a London artisanal cheese retailer, wholesaler and (formerly) cheesemaker in London, which was founded by Nicholas Saunders and Randolph Hodgson in 1979. It has been described as "London's foremost cheese store." As of 2020 the company has three shops and a cheese store in London.

== History ==
Neal's Yard Dairy was founded in 1979 by Nicholas Saunders and Randolph Hodgson after Saunders returned from a 1978 trip to Greece and could not find Greek yoghurt for sale in London. Scouring the city for anyone familiar with it, and finding none, he decided to open his own dairy. While looking for people to run it, he eventually met Hodgson, who had recently graduated with a degree in food science. Saunders was skeptical of Hodgson's degree, considering it useless, but found him willing to experiment. When they opened in July 1979, their yoghurt tasted terrible, which was eventually traced to the varnish on the curing cupboards. They launched the shop with a line of ice creams and homemade soft cheeses, and within a few months had solved the problems with the yoghurt. The original store, located in Neal's Yard, Covent Garden, London, is considered an important part of the revival of the immediate area.

One of the first customers was Monty Python's John Cleese. The new owners were still learning how to make cheese, and "had only managed yoghurt that day, so it all rather descended into a Monty Python sketch". Despite this rocky start, the store grew from a cheesemaker into a retailer of artisanal, mostly British and Irish cheeses (including farmhouse Cheddar cheese and varieties such as Stinking Bishop), spinning off the cheesemaking operation as Neal's Yard Creamery in 1985.

The shop moved around the corner to 17 Shorts Gardens in 1992. A cheese store was opened in Borough Market in 1997, which opened as a second shop in 1998. By 2010 the cheese store was moved to railway arches in Druid Street, Bermondsey. Together with Monmouth Coffee Company and a property company, Neal's Yard Dairy took a lease on a stretch of railway arches around Spa Road railway station in Bermondsey to provide accommodation for food manufacturers and wholesalers. The company headquarters moved into railway arches at Spa Terminus in 2018. In 2020 the company opened a fourth shop in Islington. The company opened a fifth shop in Barons Court in July 2025.

As of 2020, the company sells about 550 tonnes of cheese a year through its shops, exports and online.
