= Neal's Yard =

Alley in London, United Kingdom

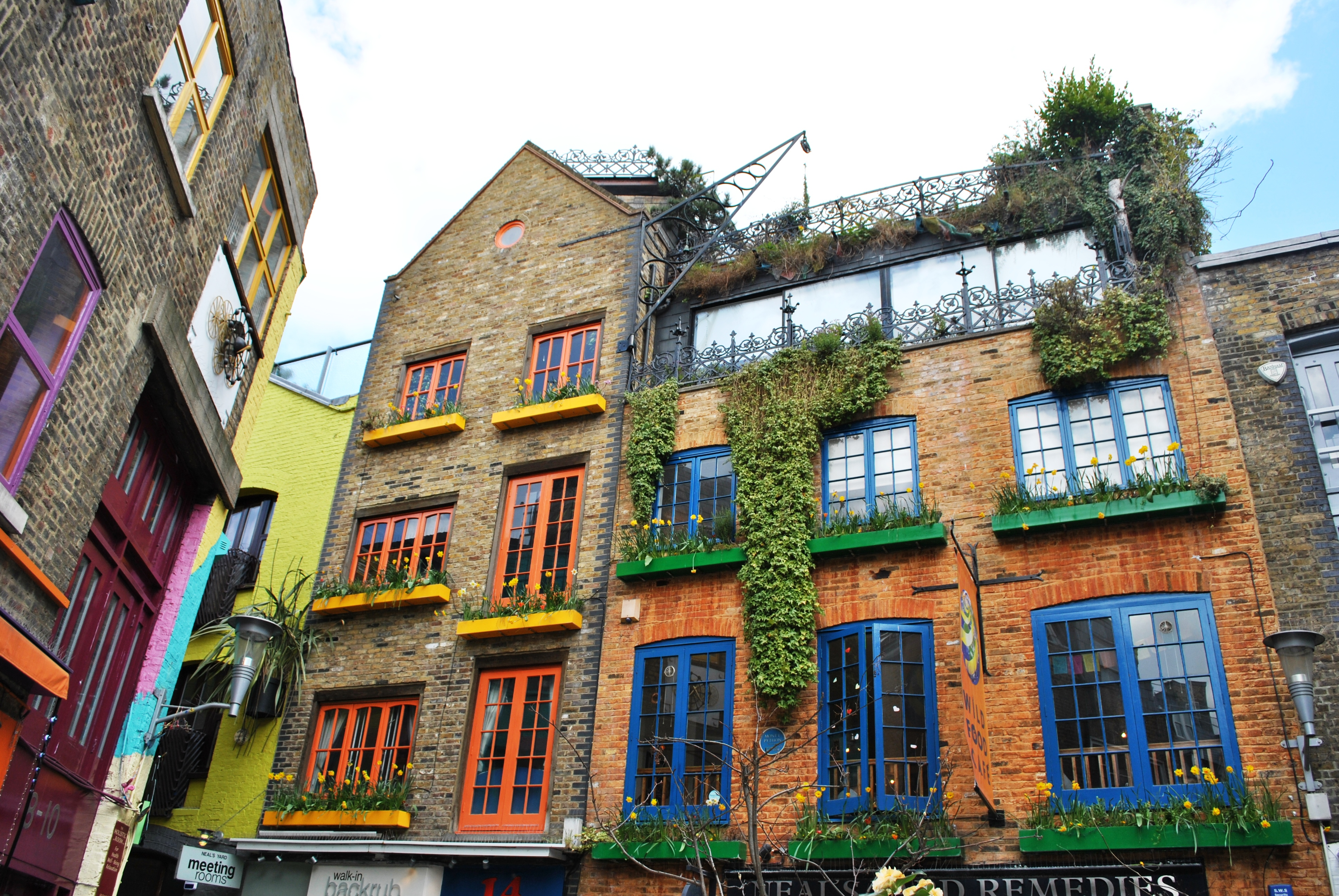

- Location within Central London
- Length: 0.04 mi (0.064 km)
- Location: London Borough of Camden
- Postal code: WC2H 9DP
- Coordinates: 51°30′52″N 0°07′35″W
- Southeast end: Shorts Gardens
- Northwest end: Monmouth Street

Construction
- Inauguration: late 1600s

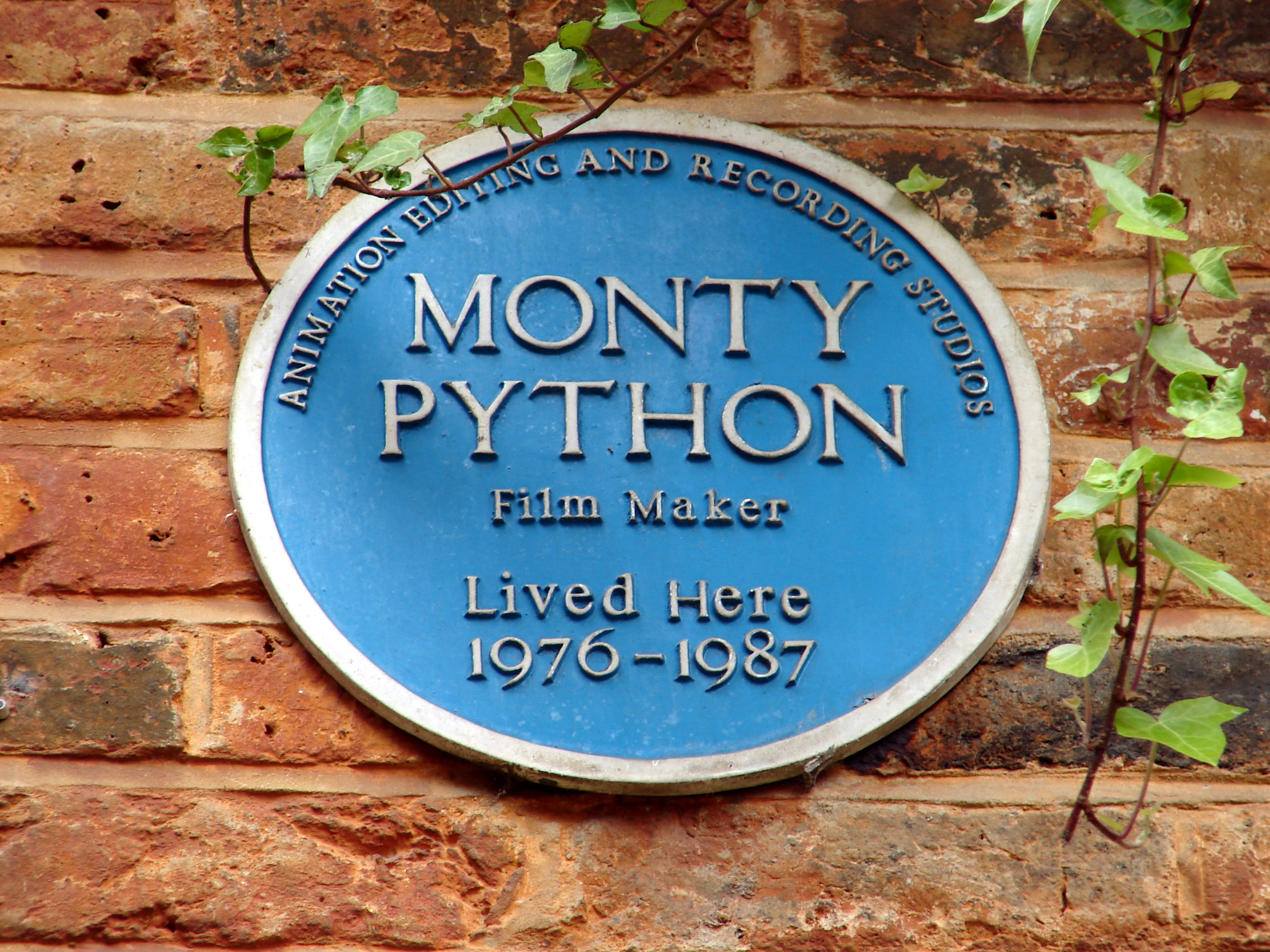
Monty Python blue plaque at Neal's Yard

Neal's Yard is a small alley in London's Covent Garden between Shorts Gardens and Monmouth Street which opens into a courtyard. It is named after the 17th-century developer Thomas Neale.

In 1976, Michael Palin and Terry Gilliam bought offices at 11 Neal's Yard, and alternative activist and entrepreneur Nicholas Saunders established the bulk Whole Food Warehouse; he had bought 2 Neal's Yard, a derelict warehouse previously used by the former Covent Garden fruit and vegetable market, for £7,000 a few years earlier. From this success, grew other enterprises in other buildings such as Neal's Yard Apothecary (now known as Neal's Yard Remedies), Neal's Yard Bakery, Monmouth Coffee Company and Neal's Yard Dairy,

The area now contains several other health-food cafes and retailers.

== Gallery ==
Neal's Yard

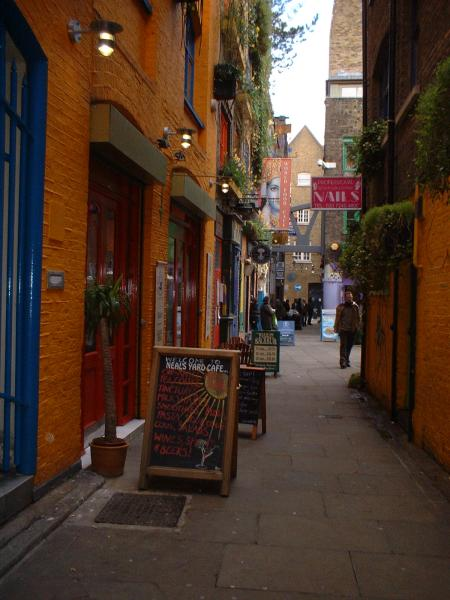

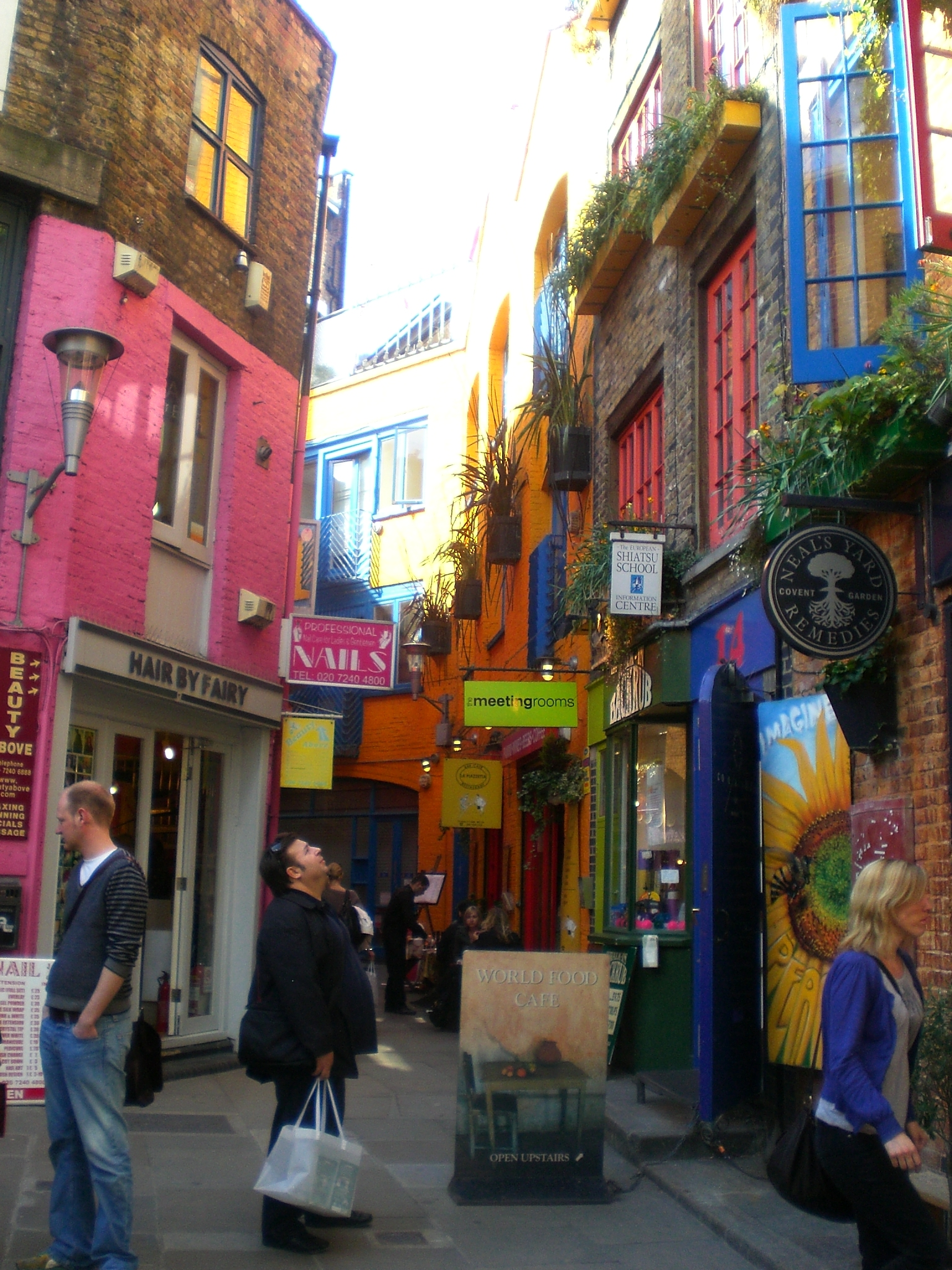

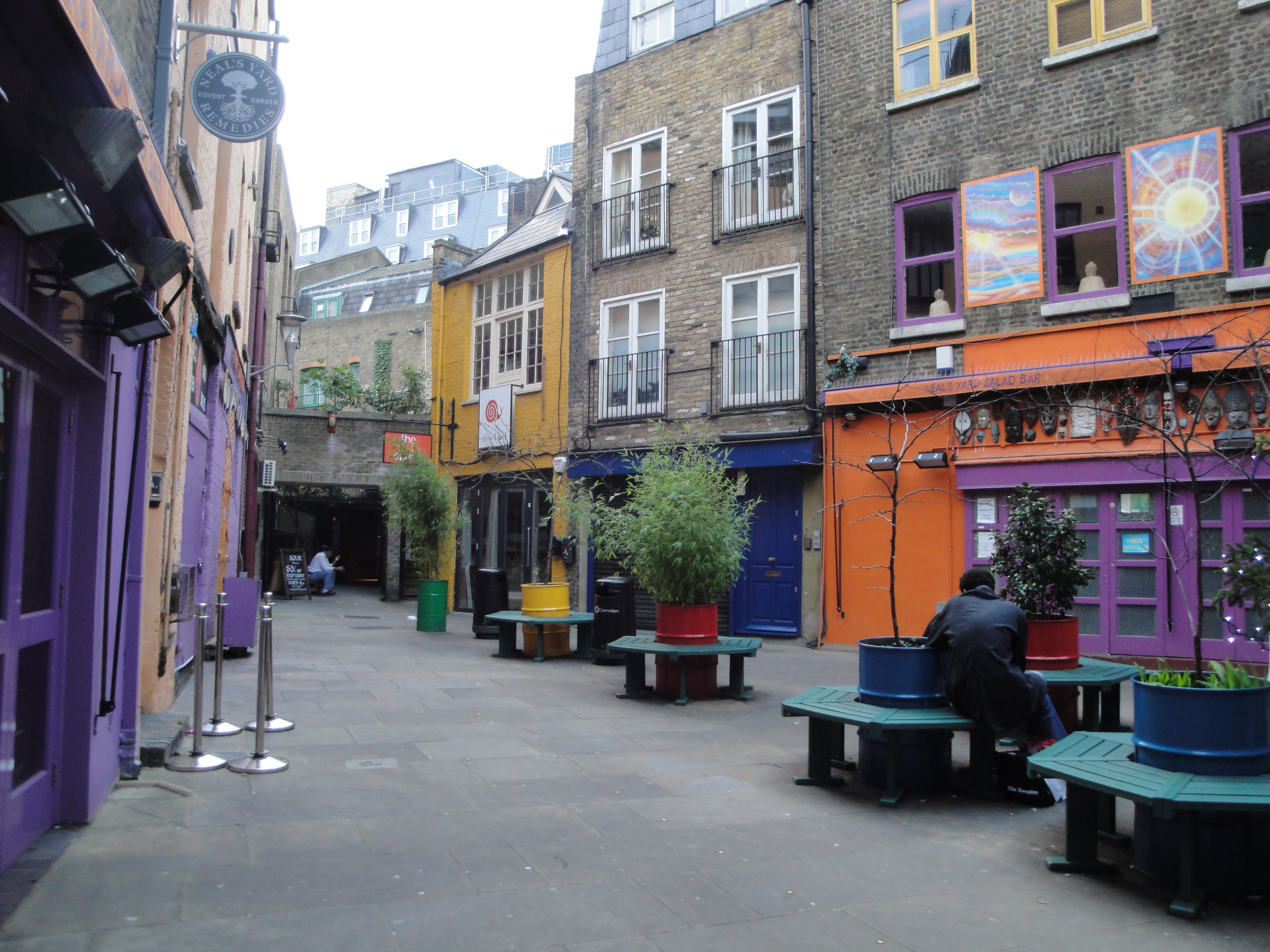
