= Nicholas Saunders (activist) =

British activist (1938–1998)

Nicholas Saunders (25 January 1938 – 3 February 1998), born Nicholas Carr-Saunders, was a British social inventor, activist, greengrocer, property developer and entrepreneur in the English 'alternative' movement from the 1970s until his death in a car crash near Kroonstad, South Africa. In 1976, he founded the Whole Food Warehouse, Monmouth Coffee Company in 1978 Neal's Yard Dairy in 1979, and the 'Apothecary' dispensing alternative and natural remedies, now known as Neal's Yard Remedies.

== Early life and education ==
Saunders was born in 1938. His father was Alexander Carr-Saunders, a biologist and social scientist who at the time directed the London School of Economics. His family was wealthy and lived in Water Eaton, Oxfordshire in a 16th-century mansion.

He attended Ampleforth College and studied engineering at Imperial College for four years.

== Career ==
In 1969, Saunders moved to 65 Edith Grove, London. Saunders was inspired by Nicholas Albery and researched, and in 1970 self-published and distributed a series of editions of Alternative London, an encyclopaedic guide to living in London, particularly for young people squatting, living on low incomes, on the fringes of conventional society, and with alternative values and ambitions such as living communally and pursuing spiritual development.

In 1975, after travelling around the country in his live-in van, Saunders published the larger Alternative England and Wales guide, similar to Alternative London. Topics included improvising plumbing, electricals, telecommunications (including phreaking), and other services, dealing with the legal and social security systems, sex, health, drug information, transport, food and spiritual, religious and mystical systems.

In 1974, he bought a former banana warehouse in Neal's Yard, Covent Garden in London, with a £7,000 inheritance (66365 in today's money).

In 1976, he opened a whole-food shop in it, named Whole Food Warehouse. This enterprise was successful and enabled him to set up "a hub of caring capitalist businesses which became the model for the fair-trade and eco-businesses that followed two decades later." like a bakery, a mill and a coffee roastery around the Yard. His businesses included Monmouth Coffee Company with Anita Le Roy in 1978, and therapy rooms.

Something of the character of Neal's Yard at the time is conveyed by pieces by Tim Hunkin: a water clock on the frontage of the shop and, inside the yard, a coin-operated animated wooden sculpture.

Positive personal experience with MDMA (ecstasy) in the 1990´s led Saunders to investigate and write about this drug. He wrote a series of books beginning with E for Ecstasy, and established the "ecstasy.org" website to provide not only general information but specific guides to various batches of the drug in circulation at any given time.

== Personal life and death ==
In 1981, his son, Kristoffer was born. During the 1980s he lived alone and suffered from depression. In the 1990s "he fell in love with Anja Dashwood, with whom he collaborated and lived, in the flat above Neal’s Yard, for the rest of his life".

Saunders died on 3 February 1998 age 60 in a car crash near Kroonstad, South Africa. At the time of his death, he was researching the use of psychoactive drugs by peoples in various parts of the world as part of traditional social rituals .

== Publications ==
- Alternative London. 1970. 50,000 copies printed.
  - Alternative London. Revised edition, 1971. 52,300 copies printed.
  - Alternative London Survival Guide for Strangers. Abridged edition, 1972. 50,000 copies printed.
  - Alternative London. Revised edition, 1974. 38,000 copies printed.
  - Alternative London. Revised edition, 1977.
  - Alternative London. Revised edition, 1982. Edited by Georganne Downes.
- Alternative England and Wales. 1975.
- E for Ecstasy. 1993.
- Ecstasy and the Dance Culture. Revised and updated version of E for Ecstasy, 1995.
- Ecstasy Reconsidered. Revised and updated version of Ecstasy and the Dance Culture, 1997.
