= Neal's Yard Remedies =

UK-based multi-level marketing company

- Type: Private
- Industry: Cosmetics
- Founded: 1981; 45 years ago
- Founder: Romy Fraser
- Website: www.nealsyardremedies.com

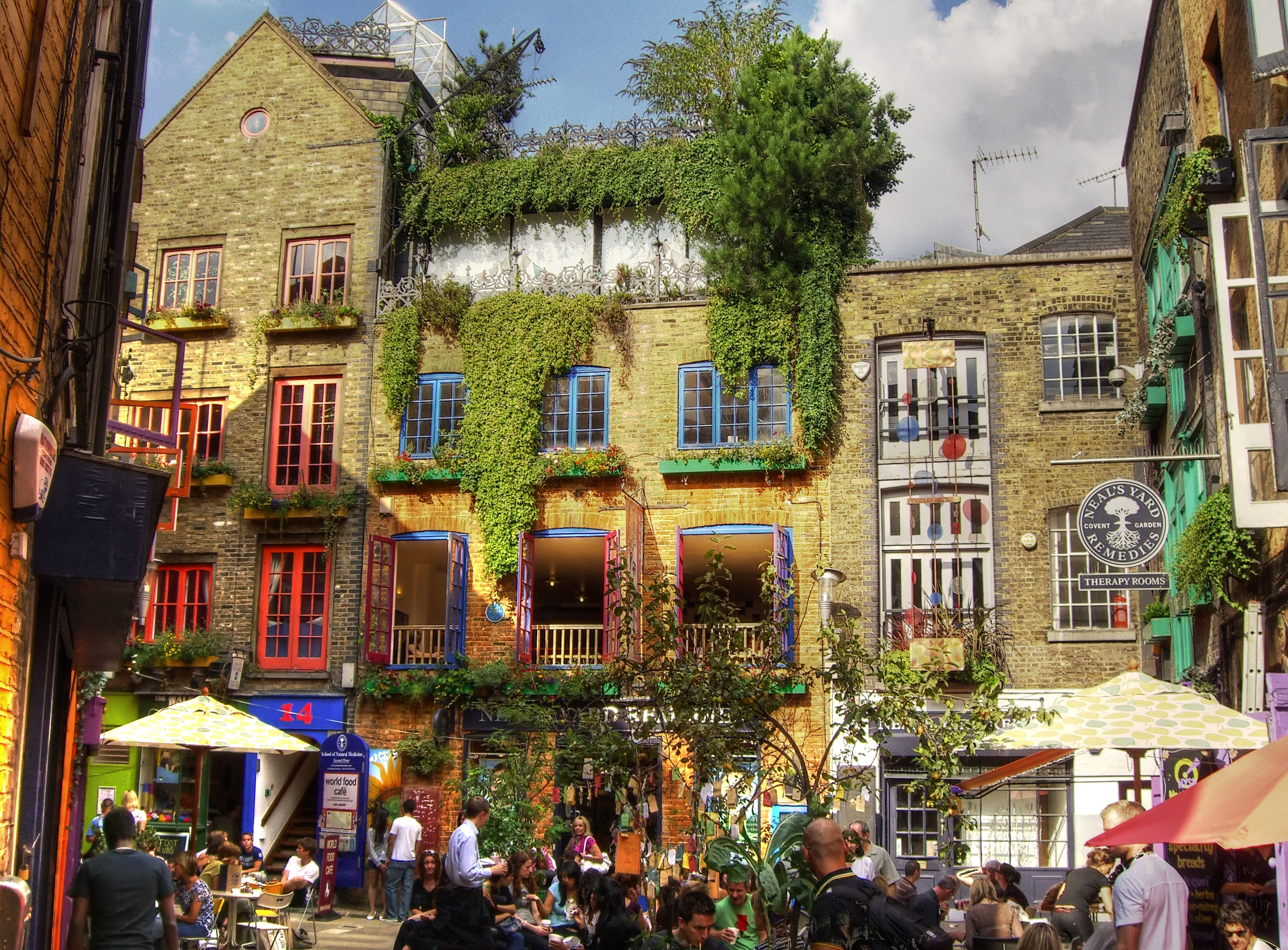
Neal's Yard Remedies, Covent Garden, London

Neal's Yard Remedies is a British retail and multi-level marketing company selling cosmetics, skin care products and essential oils. The direct selling arm is branded NYR Organics. The company was founded in 1981.

== History ==
Founder Romy Fraser, then a teacher and single parent with two daughters, abandoned her career in education in 1981 and opened the first Neal's Yard Remedies shop in Neal's Yard in Covent Garden, London. Originally operating under the name Neal's Yard Apothecary, the outlet was intended as an alternative pharmacy; the company adopted the current name in 1986, to avoid the assumption it was a registered pharmacy, when a franchised off-shoot opened in Oxford. It sells dried herbs, homoeopathic products, essential oils, Bach flower remedies, and a similar range of toiletries.

Fraser founded the business as an extension of Neal's Yard Wholefoods, the first such shop in London, which was run by Nicholas Saunders who offered to split the premises and guarantee Fraser's bank loan. Other retailers were making requests to stock Fraser's products by 1984. Fraser opened a factory in a former builder's yard in Balham, South London around the same time to cope with demand, moving to a larger factory in 1993. She brought in a managing director in 1999 to concentrate on product development. In 2001, the company's best selling products included frankincense nourishing cream, rosemary soap, plus seaweed and arnica foaming bath.

In 2005, Fraser reduced her stake in the private company from 70% to 15%, selling the difference for at least £10 million to Peter Kindersley, according to the Financial Times. Kindersley, a former publisher, was by this time the owner of Sheepdrove Organic Farm and heavily committed to the associated movement. At this point, the company had a turnover of £12 million. (By 2008, Kindersley owned 90% of the stock, but gave 15% of the company to 280 employees that September.) Also in 2005, the company moved its headquarters from Battersea, South London to a new factory facility at Peacemarsh, near Gillingham, Dorset, which employed 222 people in 2018. In April 2009, the company launched their direct selling arm, NYR Organics which constituted 25% of sales by 2011. It had 5,000 sellers in the UK by 2013 and expanded operations to Ireland. As of 2013, the company had 60 retail stores internationally. By its own account, most of its company's sales in 2018 were to buyers in Asia and the United States.

Neal's Yard Remedies is co-owned by Peter, Barnabas, and Anabel Kindersley. Denise Bonner serves as the global head of NYR Organic. From 2000 to 2014, Dragana Vilinac, originally from Sarajevo, was connected with the company, initially as a consultant and then as its head herbalist. By 2015, the company's products were being stocked in 21 countries. As of August 2021, the company was being run by Barnabas Kindersley. The company announced at this time that it was ceasing to trade via "direct selling" in France and Germany owing to an increase in administrative costs.

Romy Fraser received an OBE "for services to the health and beauty industry" in the 2008 New Year's Honours. She no longer had any connection with the company by 2014. Neal's Yard Remedies was the first company to be certified by the Soil Association, the organic charity, and the first to be certified as carbon neutral; they use Fairtrade Foundation ingredients. In 2015, the company received an award for innovation in the supply chain category of The Guardian's Sustainable Business Awards. Neal's Yard Holdings Limited, according to its accounts, made pre-tax profits of £3 million in the year ending March 2019 on sales of £45 million.

In May 2009 The Guardian's Ethical Living blog invited Neal's Yard Remedies to participate in an installment of the "You Ask, They Answer" online discussion series, and received assurance from the company of their willingness to participate. A later posting from a Guardian editor stated that Neal's Yard was "working on replies". Following the posting of questions about the efficacy of their remedies, and comments of a sceptical nature towards Neal's Yard alternative medicines, the company declined to participate in the discussion, and the thread was closed. The refusal of Neal's Yard Remedies to answer any of the questions was criticised by public relations experts.

In October 2013, the United States Food and Drug Administration issued an import alert regarding the barring of shipments of the company's Cocoa Eye Shadow from entry into the U.S. due to microbiological contamination.

In March 2018, Neal's Yard Remedies was notified that their products Covent Garden Superfood Organic Greens Complex and Covent Garden Superfood Organic Cocoa Blend violated the California Health & Safety Code (Proposition 65) because the company had failed to provide required warnings that the products contained lead and cadmium, respectively, and thereby posed a potential health risk to consumers. In July 2018, the company was ordered to pay a civil penalty of $1,500.

== False health claims ==
In April 2008, the BBC reported on the company's claims that the homeopathic preparations they offer can help to prevent and treat serious fatal diseases such as malaria. It was reported that this practice was "highly dangerous and it puts people's lives at risk." Later in the year, the Medicines and Healthcare products Regulatory Agency (MHRA) said that the product "Malaria Officinalis 30c" was "clearly intended to be viewed as a treatment or preventive" and the company's actions were "potentially harmful to public health and misleading", and ordered that the product be withdrawn from sale; Neal's Yard acknowledged there was no proof the product worked and withdrew it from sale on 17 April 2008.
