= Monmouth Coffee Company =

British coffee roaster and seller

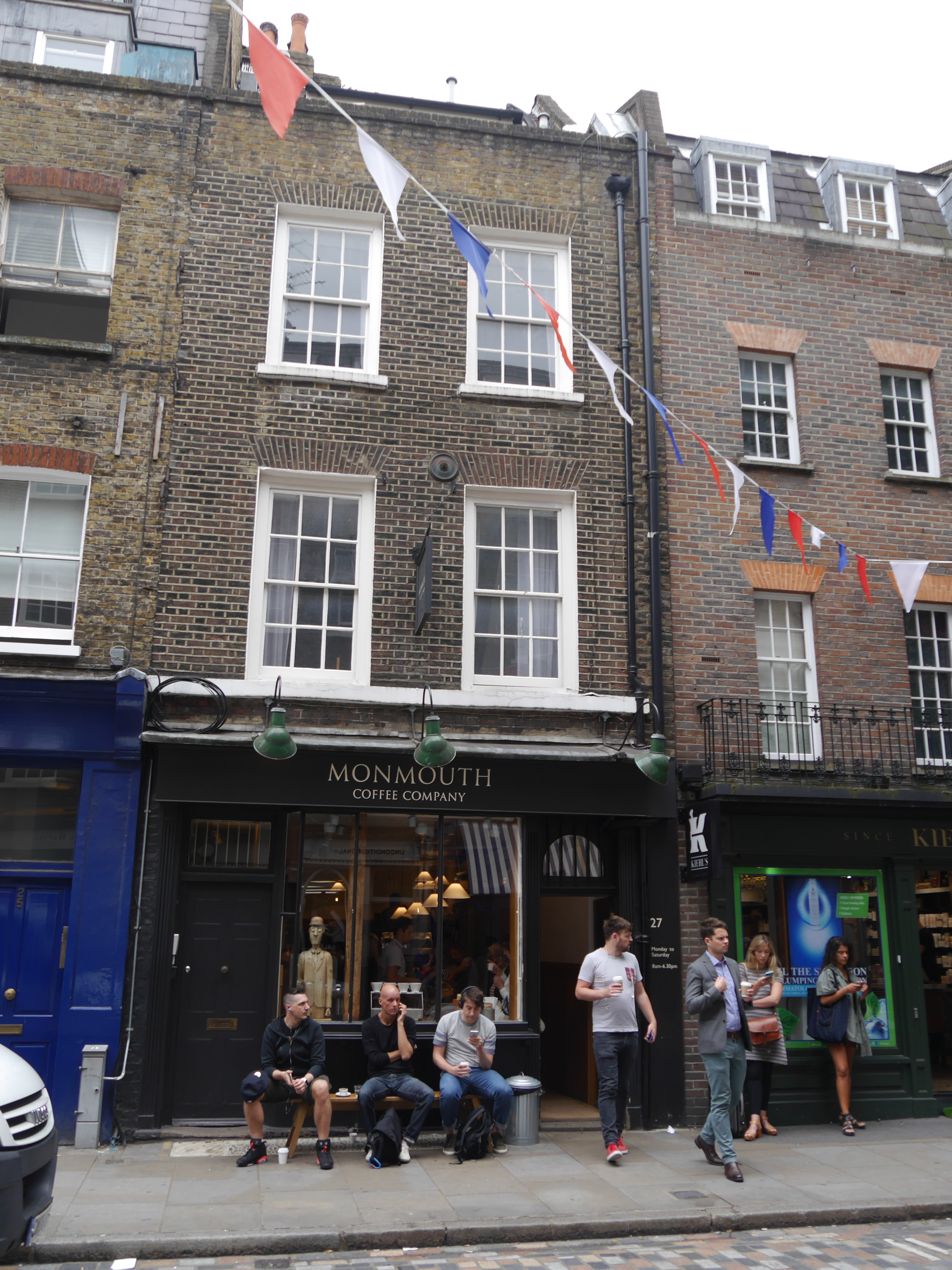
- The original Monmouth Coffee Company shop
- Company type: Private
- Industry: coffee roasting, coffee shops
- Founded: 1978; 48 years ago in 27 Monmouth Street, Covent Garden, London, England
- Founders: Nicholas Saunders; Anita Le Roy
- Headquarters: Arch 3, Discovery Estate; St James's Road, Bermondsey, London
- Number of locations: 3 (2022)
- Website: www.monmouthcoffee.co.uk

Monmouth Coffee Company is a coffee roaster, retailer and wholesaler in London, which was founded in 1978. It played an important role in regenerating Neal's Yard and Borough Market. It has remained focused on roasting and selling coffee beans and was one of the foundations for the third wave of coffee in London after the year 2000.

== History ==
Monmouth Coffee was founded in 1978 by Nick Saunders and Anita Le Roy. Le Roy later took over the business. Together with Neal's Yard Dairy and Saunders' other businesses, Monmouth Coffee transformed the run down area around Neal's Yard in Covent Garden, central London. The original shop is at 27 Monmouth Street (51°30′51.7″N 00°07′36.5″W), a grade II listed 18th-century terraced house. The basement was used to roast coffee and the ground floor as a tasting room. In its early years, the shop sold three or four kinds of green or roast coffee beans in sacks containing one, three, seven or ten pounds. Le Roy wanted to buy coffee from individual farmers, but that was not possible until 1996, when a new coffee importer, Mercanta, opened. Monmouth Coffee was one of their early customers. Monmouth Coffee and Mercanta were a foundation for the third wave of artisan coffee shops in London after 2000 and several Monmouth Coffee baristas went on to found their own coffee businesses.

Monmouth Coffee has expanded gradually, while remaining focused on roasting and selling coffee beans. A coffee stall was opened in Borough Market in 1999, followed by a second shop in a former fruit and vegetable warehouse in the market (51°30′19.8″N 00°05′29.1″W) in 2001. Along with Brindisa and Neal's Yard Dairy, Monmouth Coffee played an important role in the revival of Borough as a retail food market. In 2007 the roastery was moved to three railway arches in Maltby Street, Bermondsey. In 2009 an arch was opened to sell coffee on Saturdays and other local traders followed suit, forming Maltby Street Market. In 2018 the company headquarters moved into five railway arches (51°29′46″N 00°04′05″W) at Spa Terminus in Bermondsey, where Monmouth Coffee, Neal's Yard Dairy and a property company had taken a lease on a stretch of railway arches around the former Spa Road railway station to provide accommodation for food manufacturers and wholesalers.

== Activities ==
Monmouth Coffee sources coffee beans from individual farms and roasts them in its roastery in Bermondsey. Its staff visit producers to find new suppliers, then the company signs long term contracts to secure its supply of high-quality coffee.

It sells coffee beans direct via its website, and via its two retail shops, which also serve coffee to drink. The roastery also opens as a retail shop on Saturdays.
