= The Wheatsheaf, Southwark =

Public house in London, England

Coordinates: 51°30′19″N 0°05′28″W

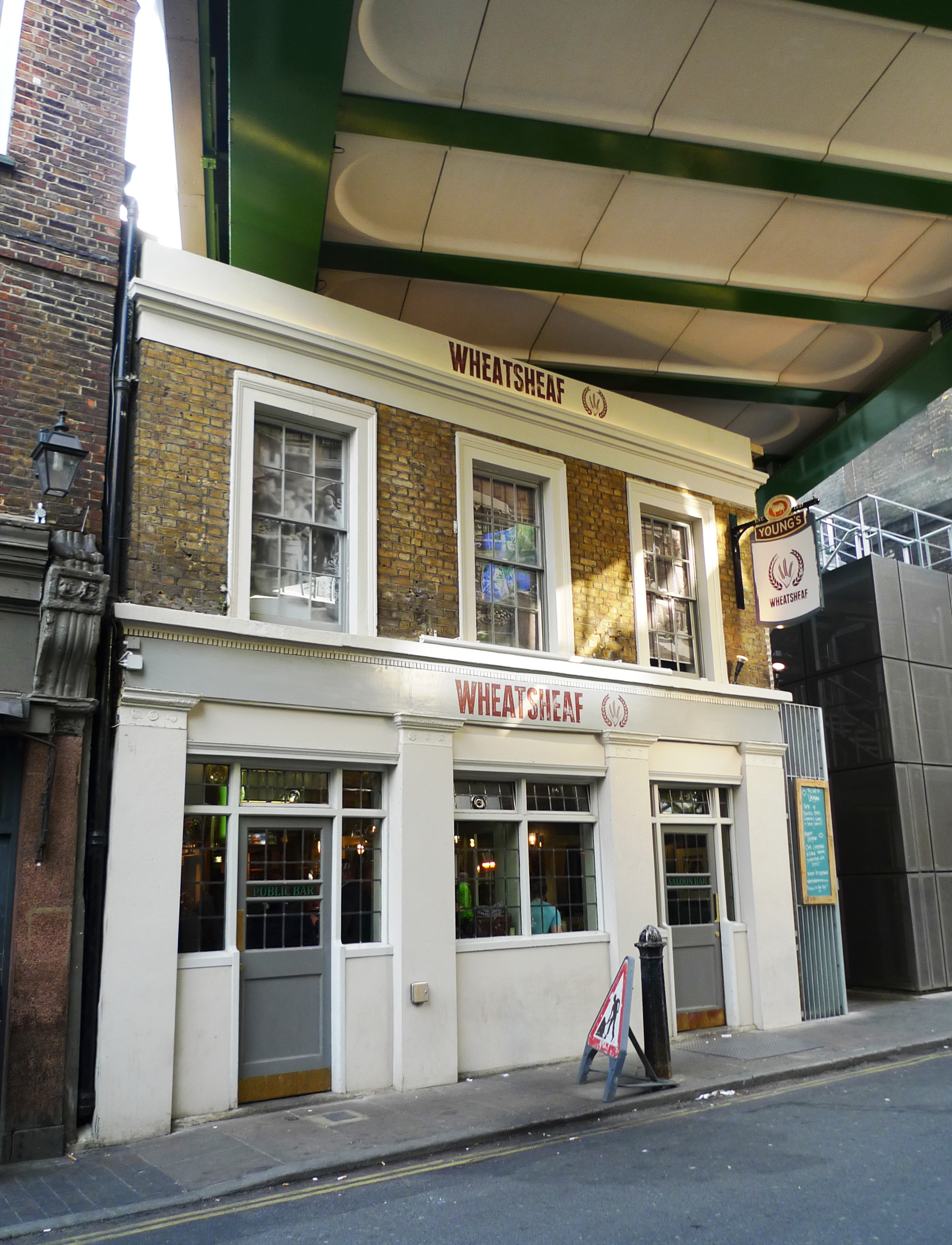
The Wheatsheaf in 2013

The Wheatsheaf is a public house at 6 Stoney Street, Borough, Southwark, London, near Borough Market.

== History ==
It was rebuilt in 1840. The building was Grade II listed in 1998, it being noted that the interior was well preserved.

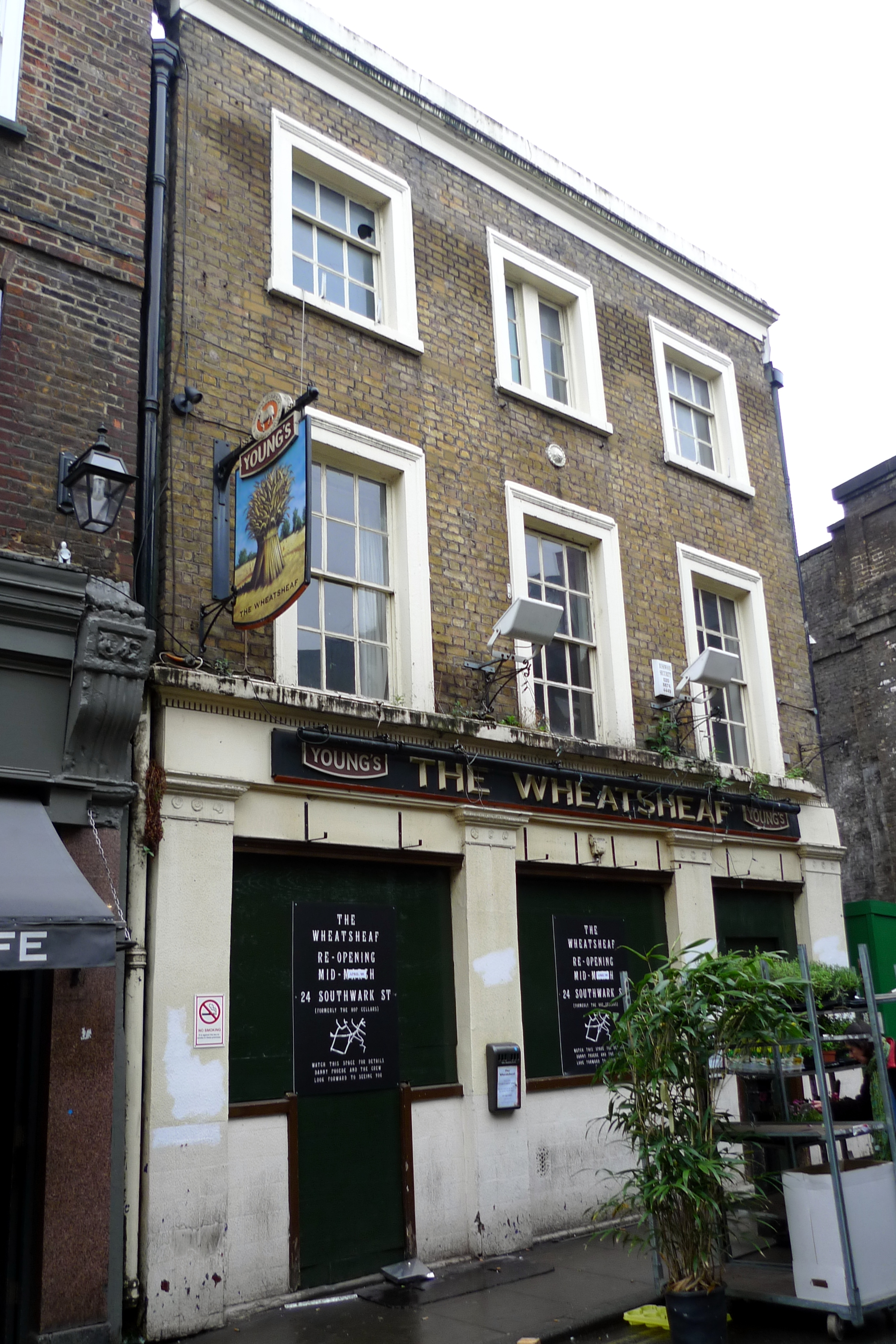
The Wheatsheaf pictured in 2009, before the top floor was removed to make way for a railway viaduct

The pub closed for four years beginning in 2009, during which the top storey was removed to make way for the Thameslink Programme viaduct. A nearby pub inside the nearby Hop Exchange complex was named The Wheatsheaf while it was being rebuilt; it later changed name to The Sheaf.

The 2017 London Bridge attack took place in the surrounding area.
