= Borough Market =

Food market in Southwark, Central London, England

Coordinates: 51°30′20″N 00°05′27″W

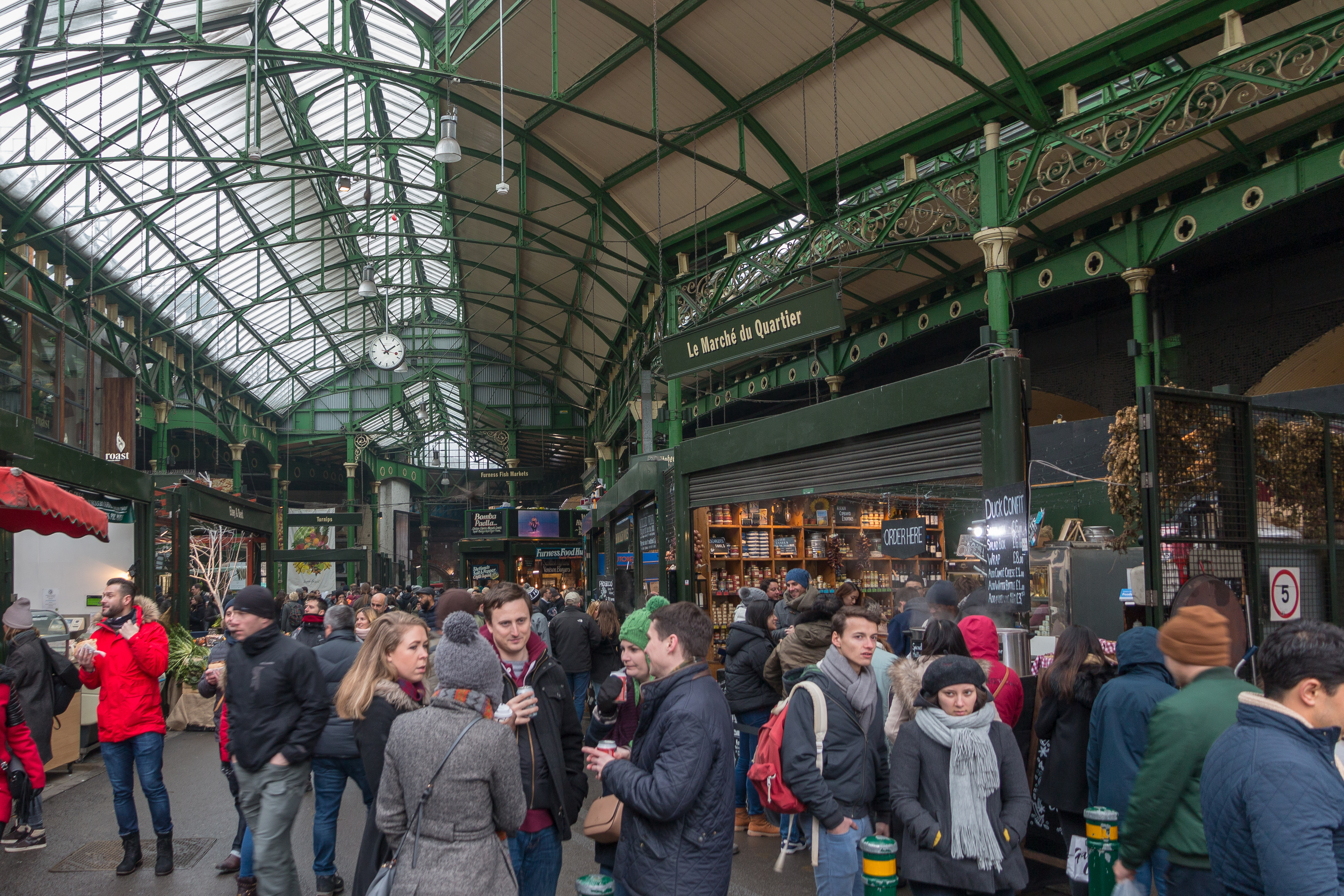
- Borough Market in 2018
- Environment: Covered
- Goods sold: Food
- Days normally open: Tuesday-Sunday (+ Mondays in December)
- Website: boroughmarket.org.uk
- Interactive map of Borough Market

Borough Market is a wholesale and retail market hall in Southwark, London, England. It is one of the largest and oldest food markets in London, with a market on the site dating back to at least the 12th century. The present buildings were built in the 1850s, and today the market mainly sells speciality foods to the general public.

== History ==
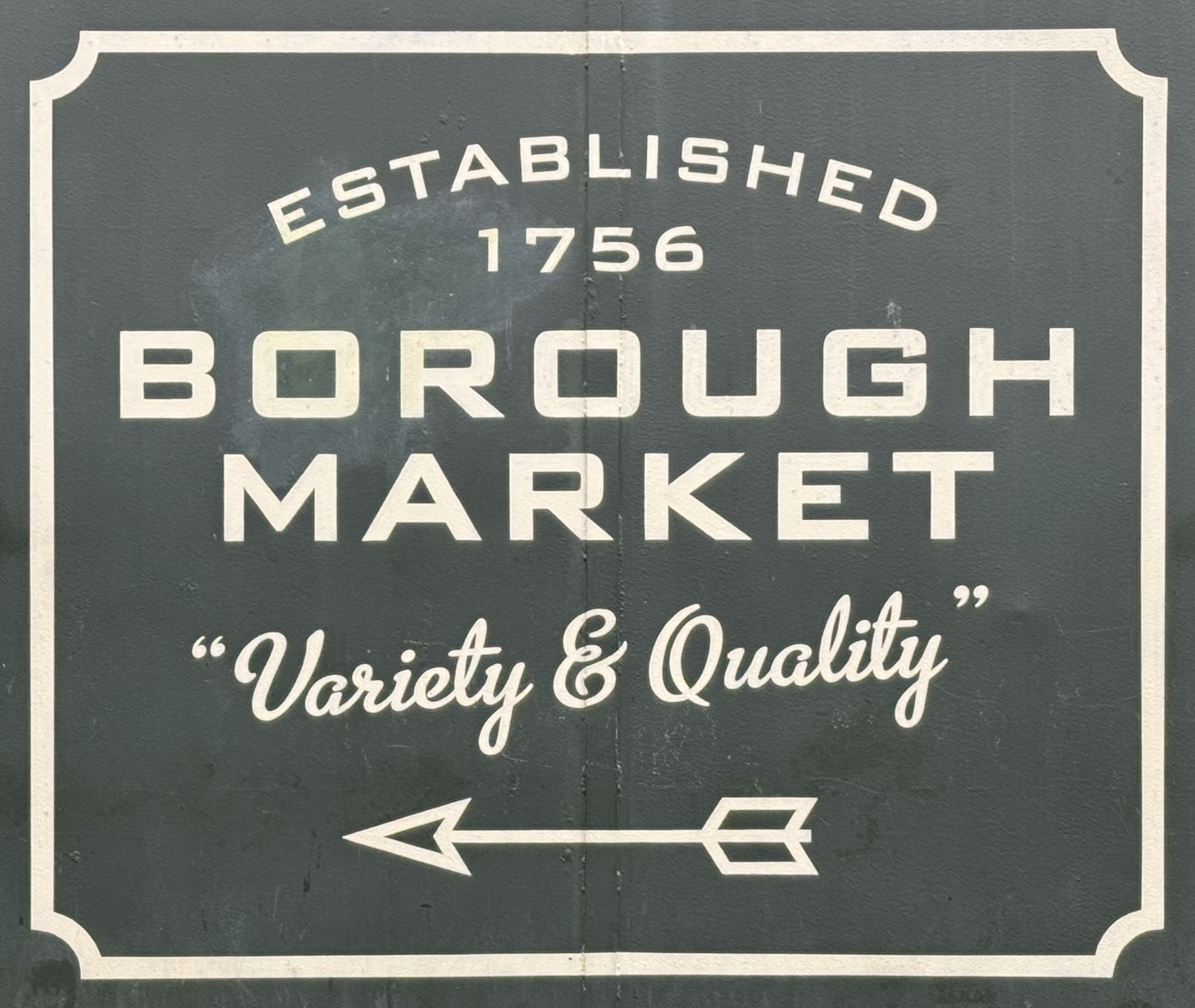
Historical sign

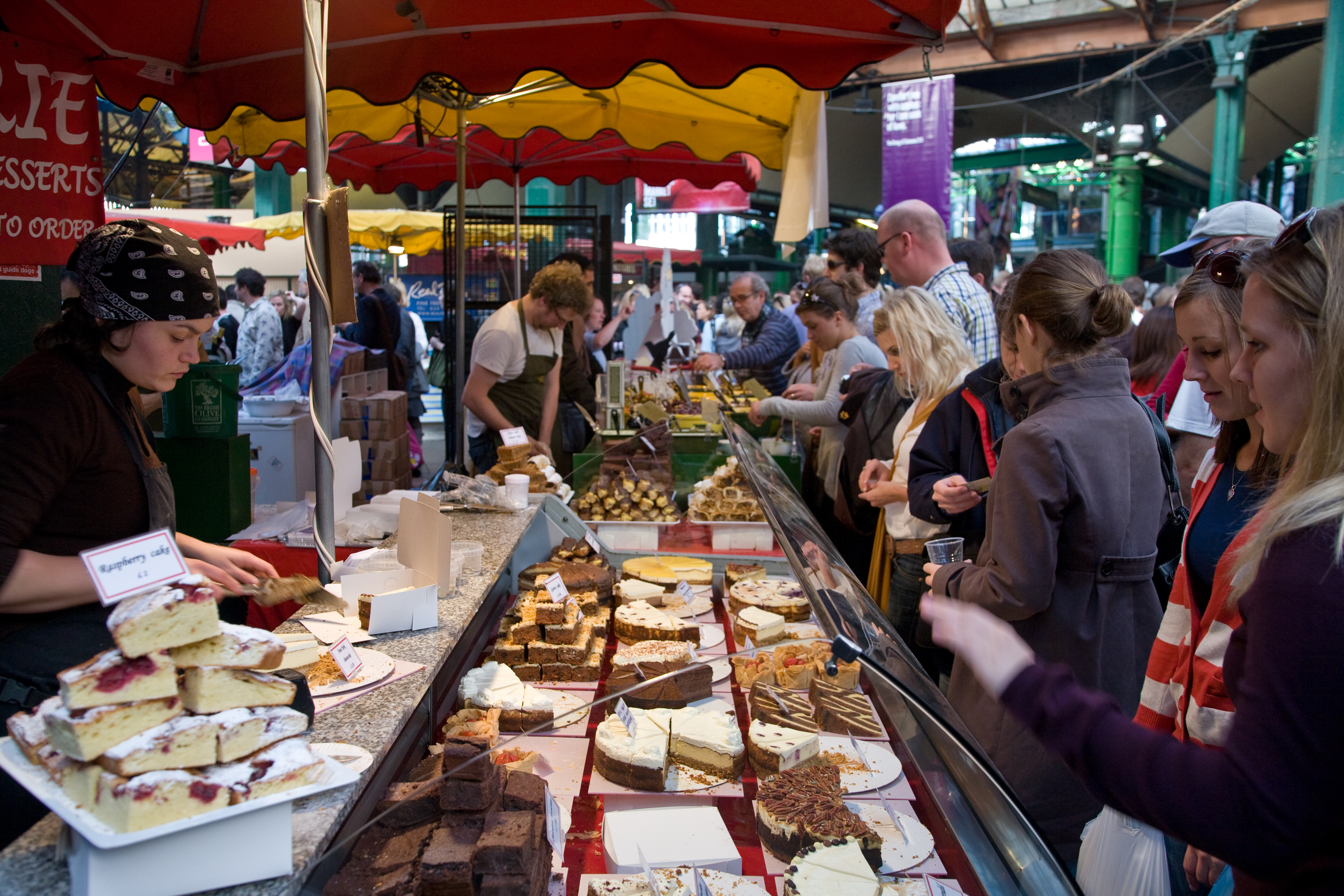
Borough Market cake stall

Southwark Market Act 1755
- Act of Parliament
- Parliament of Great Britain
- Long title: An Act to prevent the holding of any Market for the future in The High Street of the Borough of Southwark, in the County of Surry.
- Citation: 28 Geo. 2. c. 9
- Territorial extent: Great Britain

Dates
- Royal assent: 20 March 1755
- Commencement: 25 March 1756 (Note: Section 1.)
Other legislation
Amended by	St. Saviour, Southwark, Parochial Rates Act 1808; Borough Market (Southwark) Act 1823; London Government Scheme (Southwark Borough Market) Confirmation Act 1907
Relates to	Southwark Fire Property Disputes Act 1677; Southwark Market (No. 2) Act 1755; Borough Market (Southwark) Act 1823

Status: Amended

Text of statute as originally enacted

The market itself claims to have existed since 1014 "and probably much earlier" as Snorri Sturluson, writing in Heimskringla, describes Southwark as a "great market town" in reference to an incident of 1014. A market that originally adjoined the end of London Bridge was first mentioned in 1276 and was subsequently moved south of St Margaret's church on the High Street. The City of London received a royal charter from Edward VI in 1550 to control all markets in Southwark (see Guildable Manor), which was confirmed by Charles II in 1671. However, the market caused such traffic congestion that, in 1754, it was abolished by an act of Parliament, the Southwark Market Act 1755 (28 Geo. 2. c. 9).

Southwark Market (No. 2) Act 1755
- Act of Parliament
- Parliament of Great Britain
- Long title: An Act to enable the Churchwardens, Overseers, and Inhabitants, of the Parish of Saint Saviour, in the Borough of Southwark, in the County of Surry, to hold a Market within the said Parish, not interfering with The High Street in the said Borough.
- Citation: 28 Geo. 2. c. 23
- Territorial extent: Great Britain

Dates
- Royal assent: 25 April 1755
- Commencement: 14 November 1754 (Note: Start of session.)
Other legislation
Amended by	Southwark Market Act 1757; St. Saviour, Southwark, Parochial Rates Act 1808; Borough Market (Southwark) Act 1823; Southwark Market Act 1829; London Government Scheme (Southwark Borough Market) Confirmation Act 1907
Relates to	Southwark Market Act 1755

Status: Amended

Text of statute as originally enacted

A second act that year, the Southwark Market (No. 2) Act 1755 (28 Geo. 2. c. 23), allowed the local parishioners to set up another market on a new site, and in 1756, it began again on a 4.5-acre (18,000 m^{2}) site in Rochester Yard. During the 19th century, it became one of London's most important food markets due to its strategic position near the riverside wharves of the Pool of London.

Southwark Market Act 1757
- Act of Parliament
- Parliament of Great Britain
- Long title: An Act to explain, amend, and render more effectual, an Act passed in the Twenty-eighth Year of the Reign of His present Majesty, intituled, "An Act to enable the Churchwardens, Overseers, and Inhabitants, of the Parish of Saint Saviour, in the Borough of Southwark, in the County of Surry, to hold a Market within the said Parish, not interfering with the High Street in the said Borough."
- Citation: 30 Geo. 2. c. 31
- Territorial extent: Great Britain

Dates
- Royal assent: 28 June 1757
- Commencement: 2 December 1756
Other legislation
Amends	Southwark Market (No. 2) Act 1755
Amended by	Borough Market (Southwark) Act 1823; Southwark Market Act 1829; South London Market Act 1864; Borough Market (Southwark) Act 1892; London Government Scheme (Southwark Borough Market) Confirmation Act 1907; Borough Market (Southwark) Act 1930

Status: Amended

Text of statute as originally enacted

Borough Market (Southwark) Act 1823
- Act of Parliament
- Parliament of the United Kingdom
- Long title: An Act to alter and amend Two several Acts passed in the Twenty eighth and Thirtieth Years of His Majesty King George the Second, for the. Purpose of enabling the Churchwardens, Overseers and Inhabitants of the Parish of Saint Saviour in the Borough of Southwark in the County of Surrey, to hold a Market within the said Parish.
- Citation: 4 Geo. 4. c. xxxiv
- Territorial extent: United Kingdom

Dates
- Royal assent: 23 May 1823
- Commencement: 23 May 1823 (Note: Section 2.)
Other legislation
Amends	Southwark Market (No. 2) Act 1755; Southwark Market Act 1757
Amended by	Southwark Market Act 1829; South London Market Act 1834; London Government Scheme (Southwark Borough Market) Confirmation Act 1907; Borough Market (Southwark) Act 1930
Relates to	Southwark Market Act 1755

Status: Amended

Text of statute as originally enacted

The Borough Market (Southwark) Act 1823 (4 Geo. 4 c. xxxiv) required the market to produce six-month accounts that showed a "true and just account' of all income and expenditure. The Southwark Market Act 1829 (10 Geo. 4 c. cxix) provided a list of the toll rates for different types and weights of produce. This ranged from a shilling for a wagon of root vegetables to one penny for a sack of peas.

Southwark Market Act 1829
- Act of Parliament
- Parliament of the United Kingdom
- Long title: An Act to alter, amend, and enlarge the Powers of several Acts passed for holding a Market in the Parish of Saint Saviour in the Borough of Southwark in the County of Surrey; and for granting more effectual Provisions for that Purpose.
- Citation: 10 Geo. 4. c. cxix
- Territorial extent: United Kingdom

Dates
- Royal assent: 4 June 1829
- Commencement: 4 June 1829 (Note: The Acts of Parliament (Commencement) Act 1793.)
Other legislation
Amends	Southwark Market (No. 2) Act 1755; Southwark Market Act 1757; Borough Market (Southwark) Act 1823
Amended by	South London Market Act 1834; South London Market Act 1864; London Government Scheme (Southwark Borough Market) Confirmation Act 1907; Borough Market (Southwark) Act 1930

Status: Amended

Text of statute as originally enacted

By the mid-1990s, the market had declined, and trustees decided to revive it as a retail rather than a wholesale market. In 1998 they invited Henrietta Green to hold a Food Lovers' Fair, which recruited several long-term traders for the market. From 1996 they let unused space to wholesale businesses such as Neal's Yard Dairy, Brindisa and Monmouth Coffee Company. The new tenants were encouraged to open their premises to retail customers.

In 2011, seven traders were expelled from the market for trading from their storage units at Maltby Street Market a mile away. In turn the traders criticised poor facilities at the market and a move to selling takeaway food.

In the 2017 London Bridge attack, three attackers drove a vehicle over London Bridge and then ran to the area, where they stabbed and killed eight people with knives before they were shot dead by armed police. The market was closed for 11 days following the attack.

== Information ==
Borough Market is located on Southwark Street and Borough High Street just south of Southwark Cathedral on the southern end of London Bridge.

The retail market operates six days per week; it is closed on Mondays.

== Architecture ==
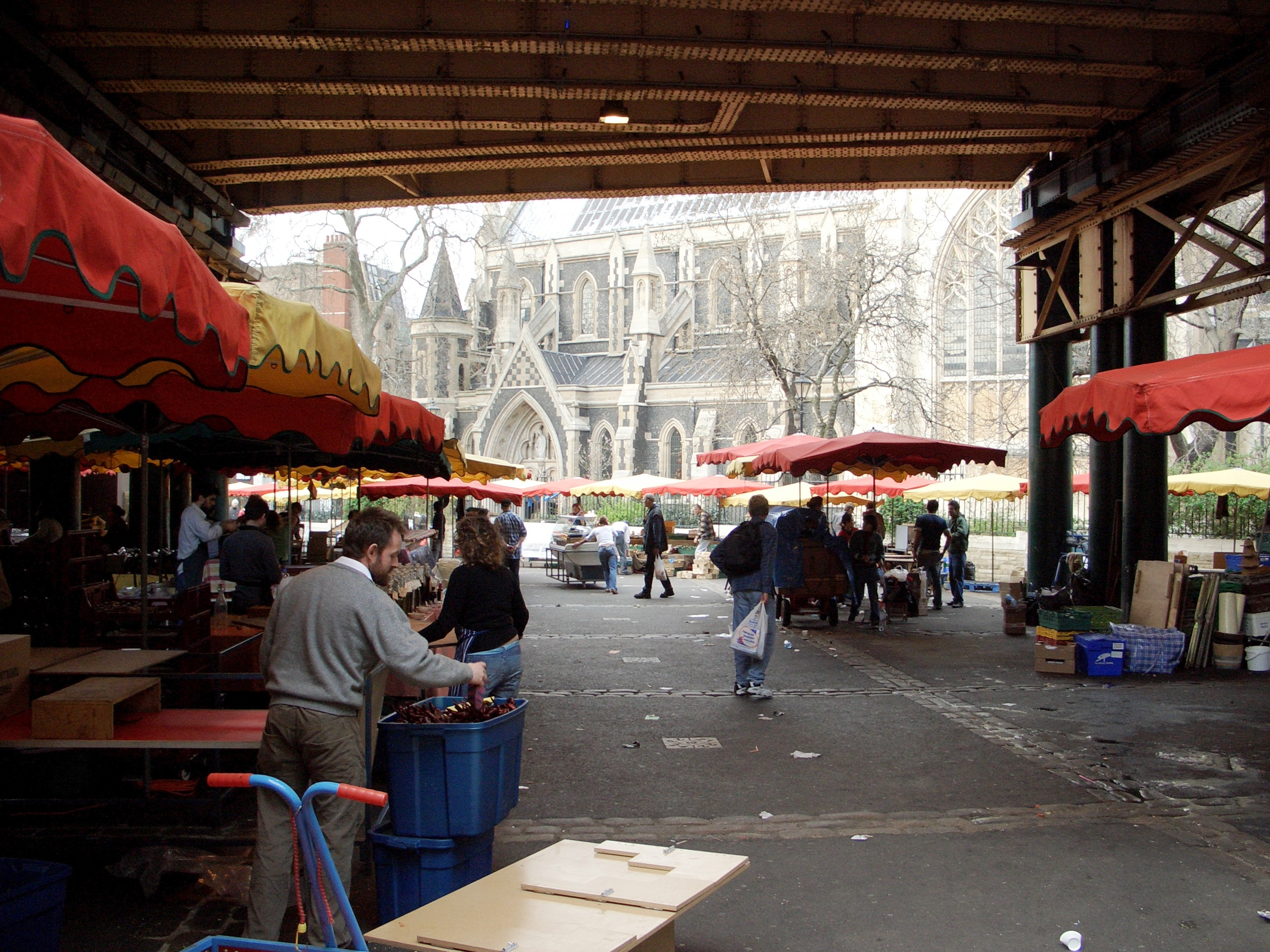
Borough Market, looking onto Southwark Cathedral

The present buildings were designed in 1851 by Henry Rose, with additions in the 1860s and an entrance designed in the Art Deco style added on Southwark Street in 1932. There have been significant changes to the buildings over the years as a result of successive expansions to the nearby railway infrastructure; see "Railway viaducts and the Thameslink Programme".

A refurbishment began in 2001. The work included the re-erection in 2004 of the South Portico from the Floral Hall, previously at Covent Garden, which was dismantled when the Royal Opera House was reconstructed in the 1990s. The original Covent Garden building was listed and the re-sited portico was Grade II listed in 2008.

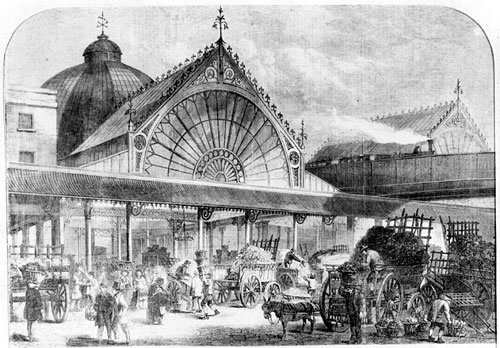
Borough Market circa 1860

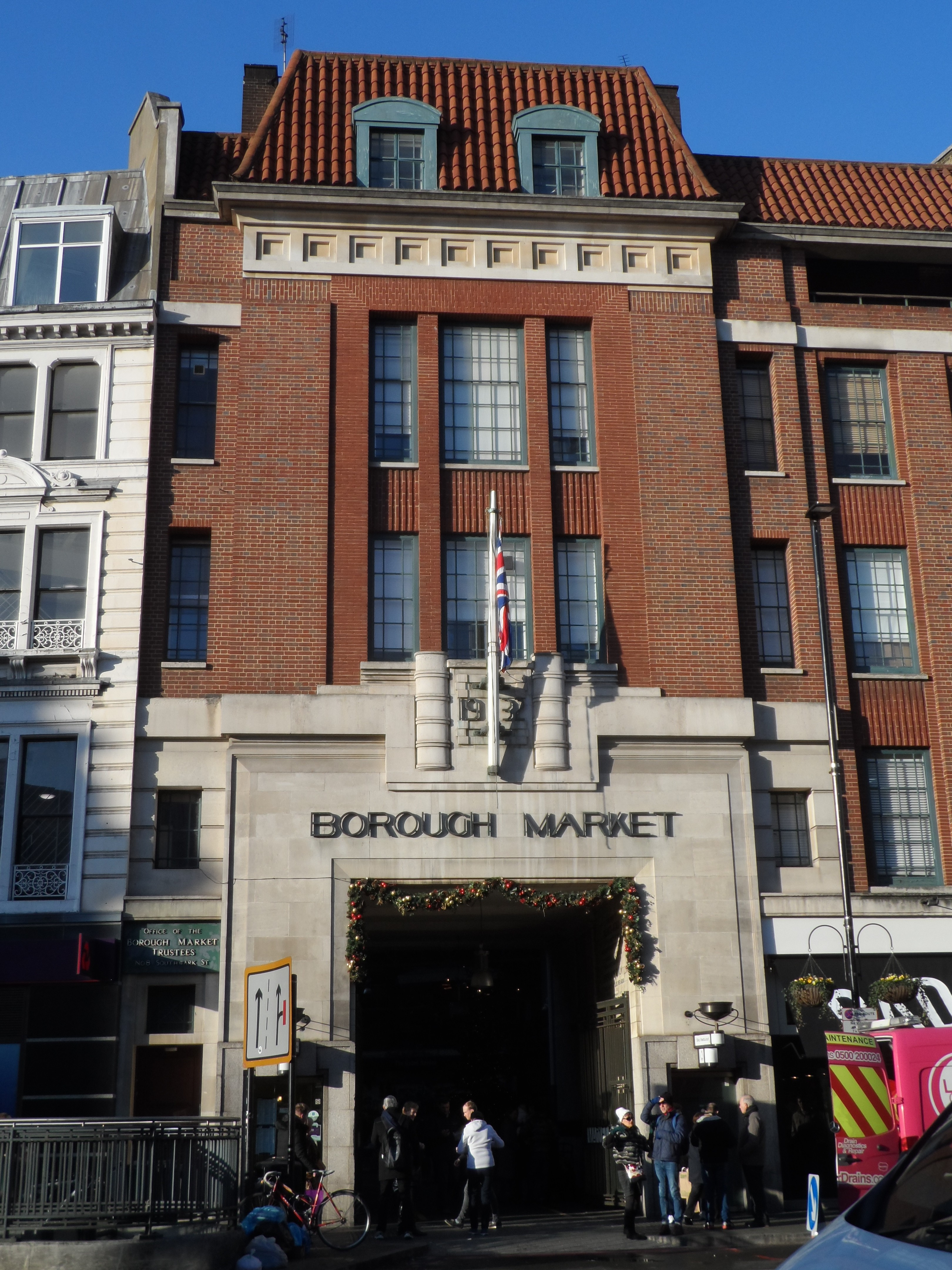
Art Deco 1932 Southwark Street entrance

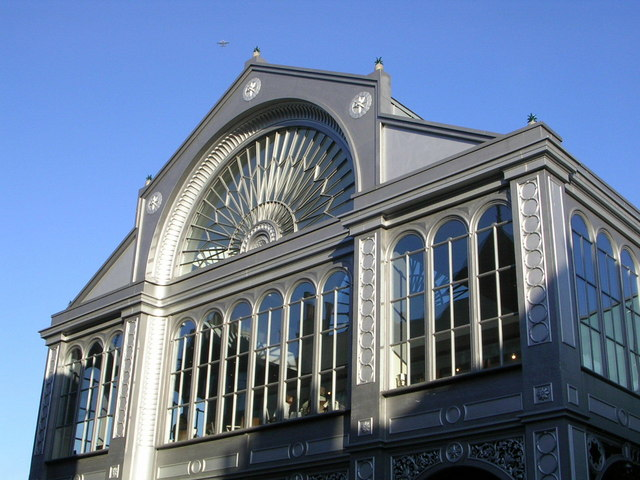
South Portico from the Floral Hall (erected 2004)

== Trade ==
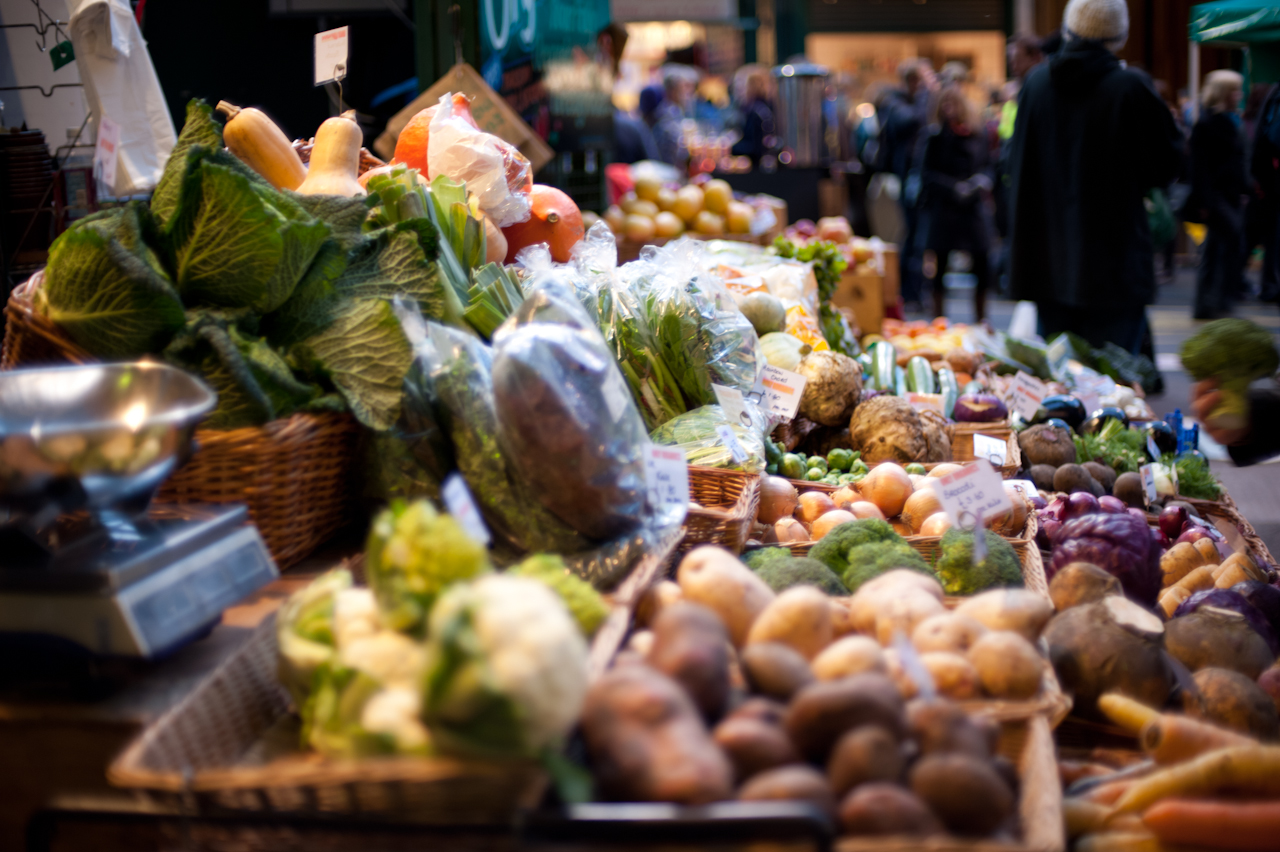
Vegetable stall

Today market stalls mainly sell specialty foods to the general public. However, in the 20th century Borough Market was essentially a wholesale market, selling produce in quantity to greengrocers. It was the main supplier, along with Covent Garden, of fruits and vegetables to retail greengrocers. Amongst the notable businesses trading in the Borough Market were Vitacress, the Lee Brothers, Manny Sugarman, AW Bourne and Eddy Robbins. JO Sims, the main importer for South African citrus fruit, were also located in the market. Stallholders come to trade at the market from different parts of the UK, and traditional European products are also imported and sold. Amongst the produce on sale are fresh fruit and vegetables, artisanal food, cheese, meat, game, baked bread, and pastry.

The market is a charitable trust in English law administered by a board of volunteer trustees, who have to live in the area.

== Film location ==
Borough Market and the surrounding streets have been used as a film location for such features as Bridget Jones's Diary (2001), Lock, Stock and Two Smoking Barrels (1998) and Harry Potter and the Prisoner of Azkaban (2004). More recently some scenes in The Imaginarium of Doctor Parnassus (2009) were shot there. As reported by the London Evening Standard, the market is available to hire for private events.

== Railway viaducts and the Thameslink Programme ==
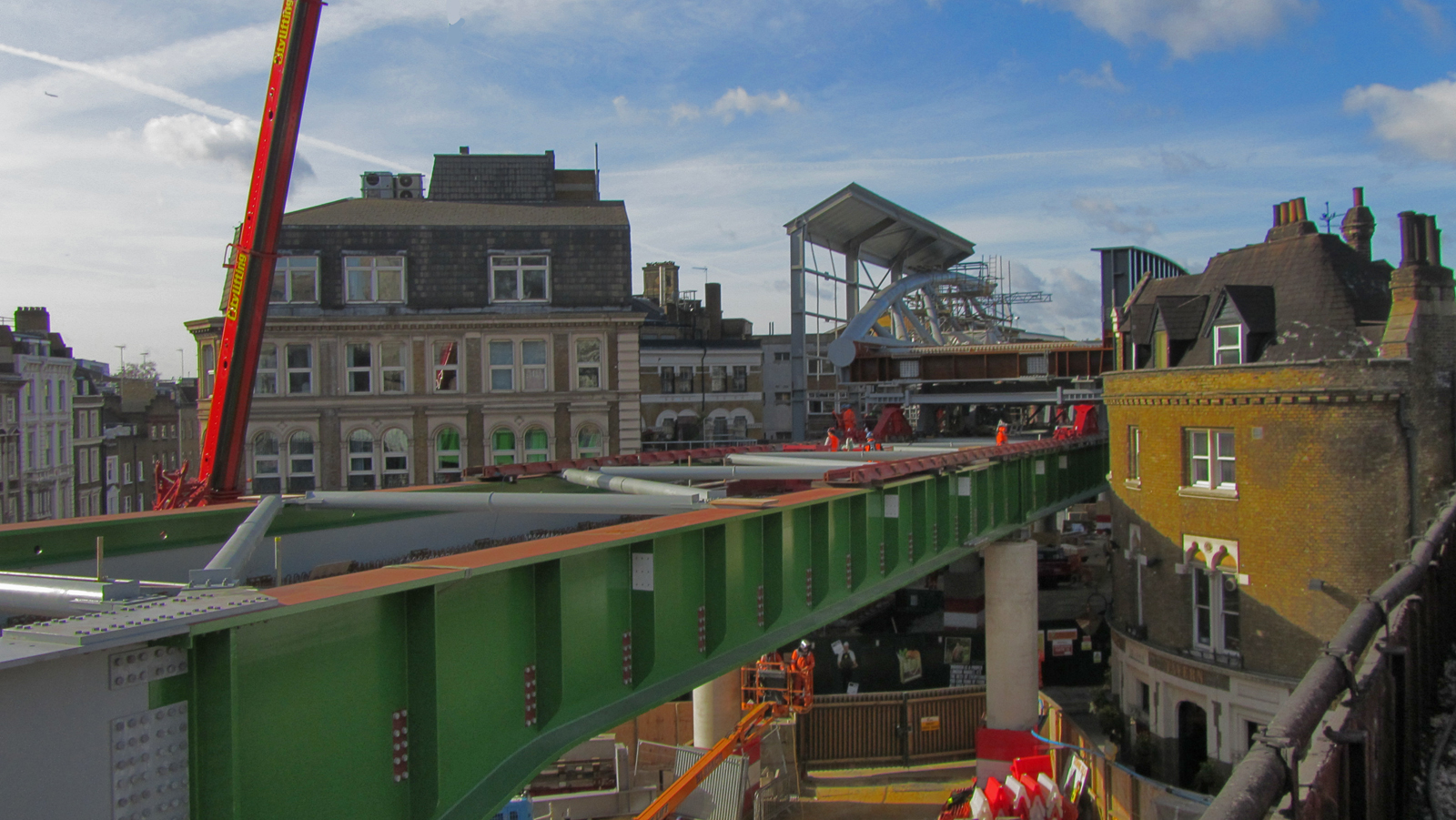
First span of the new Borough Market viaduct at Stoney Street

From 1860, the railway operating companies desired to extend services from London Bridge station into new stations at Cannon Street and Blackfriars in the City and link to the West End at Charing Cross Station. This required a viaduct, but under the Borough Market Act 1756 the trustees were forbidden to alienate their property. The compromise was that only a flying leasehold was given to the railway company for the permanent way, but only for as long as a railway operates on it. The market continues to trade underneath the arches of the viaduct. Each time there is a railway expansion requiring widening of the viaduct, the trustees receive a full compensation payment.

Most recently, as part of the Thameslink Programme, a large number of listed buildings in the Borough Market area have been altered or demolished. The market building on Bedale Street south-side has had its upper floors removed, as has the Wheatsheaf public house on Stoney Street, for the new railway bridge to cross over them. The remaining floors have been re-occupied. The old market glazed roof on Stoney Street has been re-instated and cleaned. A significant loss was the Smirke Terrace, Nos 16–26 Borough High Street, demolished in 2010.

== See also ==
- Farmers' market
