= Spa Road railway station =

Former railway station in England

Spa Road
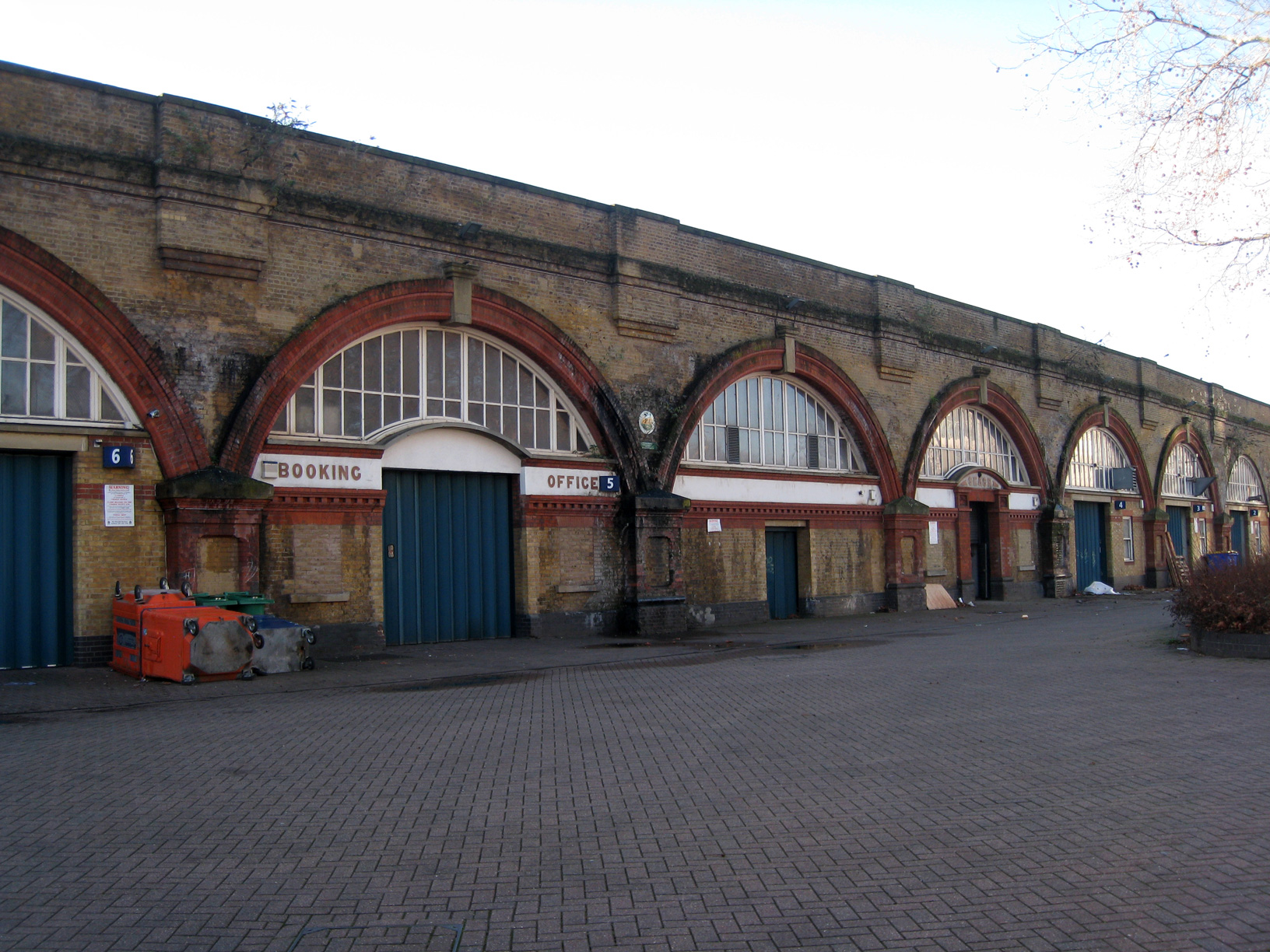
- Interactive map of Spa Road

General information
- Location: Bermondsey
- Local authority: London Borough of Southwark
- Owner: London and Greenwich Railway
- Number of platforms: 2

Key dates
- 1836: Opened
- 1838: Closed
- 1842: Rebuilt & reopened
- 1845: Rebuilt again
- 1867: Relocated
- 1877: Renamed Spa Road & Bermondsey
- 1915: Closed to passengers
- 1925: Closed to railway staff
- Replaced by: None

Other information
- Coordinates: 51.4956°N 0.0671°W

Spa Road railway station in Bermondsey, south-east London, was the original terminus of the capital's first railway, the London and Greenwich Railway (L&GR). It was located on and takes its name from Spa Road.

It was also the first terminus in what is now Greater London. Opened in 1836, the station underwent several ownership changes, was rebuilt, changed its name, and relocated before closing in 1915 due to cost-saving measures during World War I. The disused building is now part of a light industrial estate. Some elements of the original station remain visible.

== History ==
Evolution of Spa Road station and surrounding area
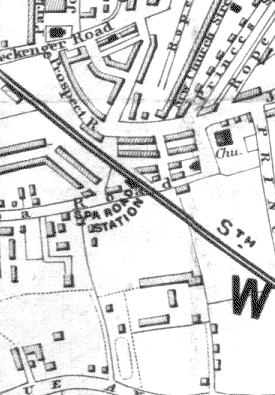
1854: the original station was located north of Spa Road on the edge of an urban area

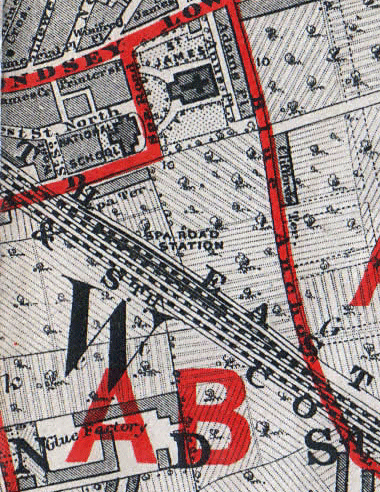
1872: the larger relocated station was located south of Spa Road amid what were still fields

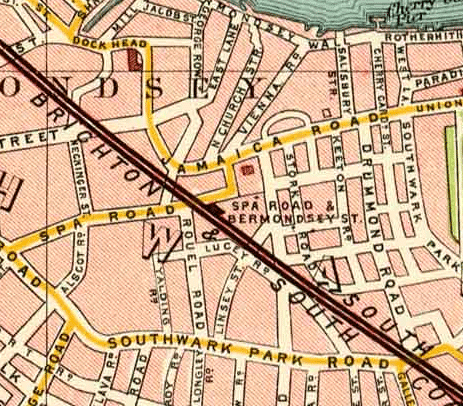
1900: by now the station was surrounded by buildings

=== First station (1836–1838) ===
In 1833 an Act of Parliament granted the L&GR the rights to build a 4-mile-long (6.4 km) viaduct from the south end of London Bridge to Greenwich and to run trains along it. However, the line was partially opened to the public well before its full length had been completed in order to maximise revenue income as soon as possible. Other companies were in the process of building their own railway lines and the L&GR wished to gain the commercial advantage of being the first to open for business. Another consideration was the company's stock price, which stood high at the end of 1835 but was at risk of falling if the line was not soon opened.

The board decided to open a 2.5-mile-long (4.0 km) stretch from Spa Road to Deptford, which served the district of Deptford. The first train left Deptford railway station for Spa Road at 8 am on 8 February 1836. Trains ran hourly on the half-hour from Spa Road, from 8.30 am to 5.30 pm, with a fare to Deptford costing 6d. There were no services after dark, as there were no signals on the line and it was not illuminated.

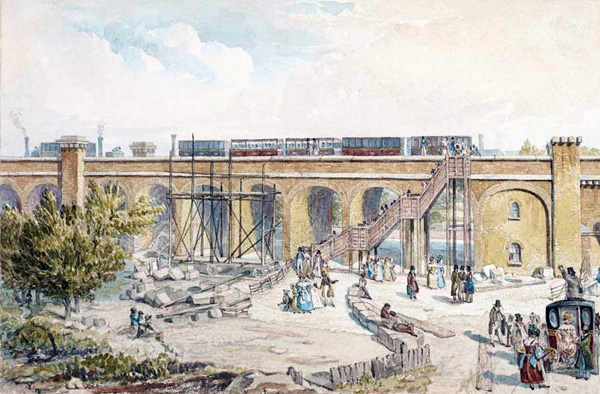
The original Spa Road station, painted by Robert Blemmell Schnebbelie in 1836

Spa Road station was within the parish of Bermondsey, which was then an industrial and working class area. From there the line crossed over marshes and market gardens to reach Deptford and Greenwich. The station itself was very basic. It was squeezed into a narrow space on a two-track viaduct with no room for buildings of any sort. The company did not even refer to it as a station but as a "stopping place." The platforms were accessed via wooden staircases on the outside of the viaduct, the one on the south side having a small wooden hut at the bottom for issuing tickets. If the platform was full, passengers were supposed to queue on the steps to wait for the trains. In practice, though, they often queued on the track itself. The company had not originally intended to provide platforms at all and had fitted its carriages with steps to allow passengers to board from track level, but found that low platforms were more convenient. The Commissioner of Pavements required the L&GR to maintain the staircases and to provide at least two services a day from the station.

Perhaps not surprisingly given the station's physical limitations, only a month after it was opened there was a fatal accident when passenger Daniel Holmes was run over by a train. The other passengers had been waiting with others on the track when the Deptford train arrived. They climbed up on to the platform but Holmes remained on the track. The engine driver, Thomas Millender, was distracted by Holmes and collided with the waiting southbound train. A number of passengers who had already boarded the southbound train were injured and Holmes was killed instantly when Millender's runaway engine struck him. The duty policeman only just escaped also being struck and was dismissed for failing to warn the passengers in time. The accident was witnessed by George Walker, the L&GR's Resident Director, who subsequently wrote of the difficulties that his staff experienced in keeping people off the tracks.

The L&GR opened the line between London Bridge and Spa Road on 14 December 1836. Usage of Spa Road station dropped significantly after the opening of London Bridge railway station, and drivers began to go straight through without stopping if they had no passenger requests. This changed in March 1838 when the company's directors ordered trains to stop at Spa Road hourly throughout the day and reserved half a carriage for passengers to and from the station on Sundays and holidays. They also took steps to improve access to the station. Despite this, it was little used and in late 1838 the L&GR's directors decided to close the station. It was boarded up at the end of 1838 and remained out of use until 1842.

=== Second station (1842–1867) ===
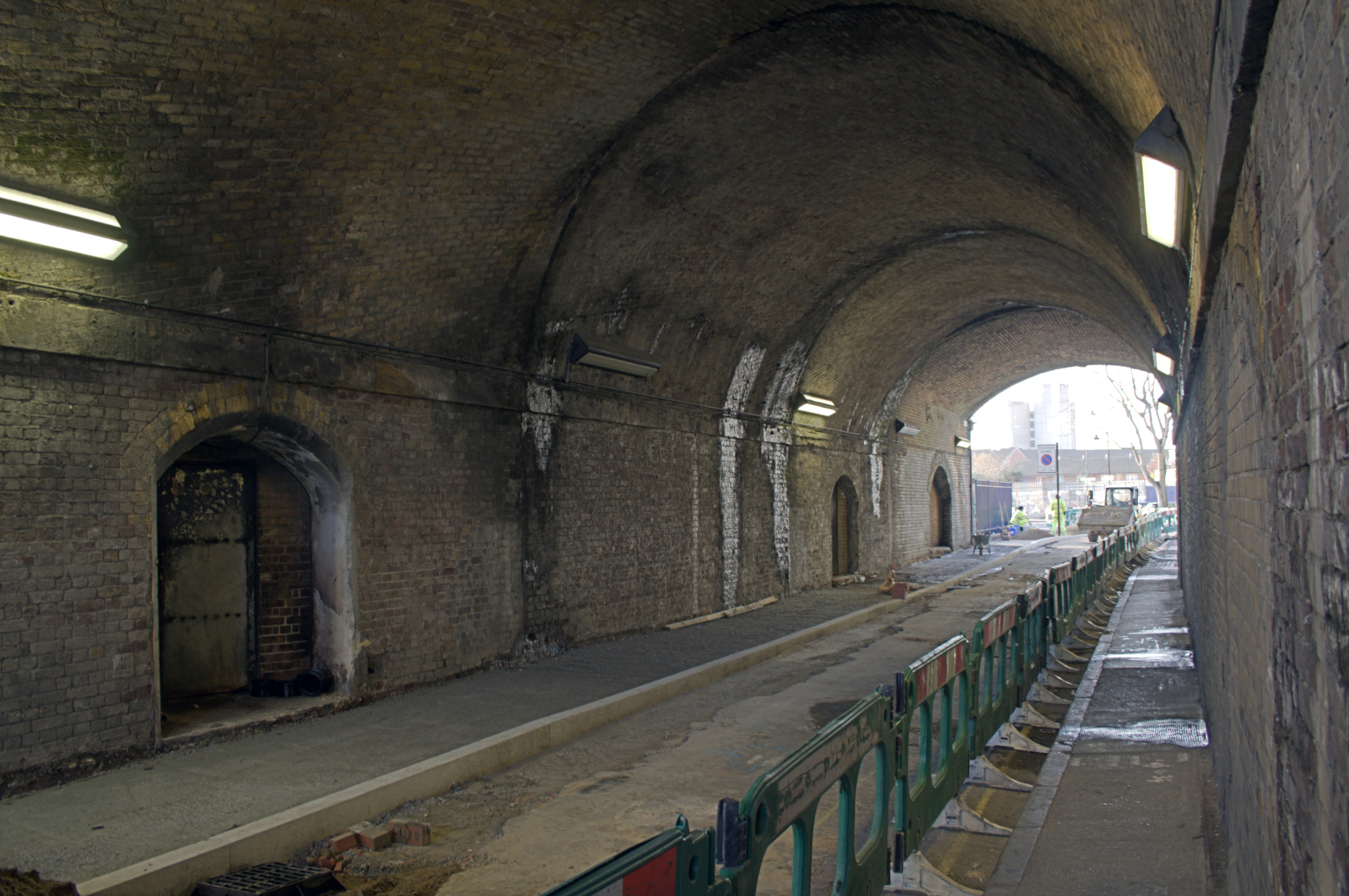
Railway arch at Marine Street, just north of Spa Road. The two iron doors on the left gave access to the ticket office of the 1842–1867 station and the platform.

In 1840, the L&GR applied to Parliament for powers to widen the viaduct, which was so narrow that the carriages only had a clearance of about 20 inches (51 cm) between their sides and the parapet wall, and about 3 feet (0.91 m) clearance in the centre. There was no room for buildings of any description anywhere on the line. The company came under pressure to reopen Spa Road station, as competition from the railway had caused the demise of a horse-drawn coach service from Bermondsey to Deptford. It agreed to construct an improved station when the line was widened. This involved moving the access staircase to the north side of the viaduct, building a waiting and booking office room in the arches and constructing a shed over the line. A local contractor, Thomas Jackson, began work on the new station in June 1842 and it opened in September, with the work costing £450 (£33,000 at 2010 prices). The following February another life was lost at Spa Road when a man named Birmingham suffered a fatal injury in the station.

The station was upgraded in August 1843 when signals were erected there, and in May 1844 the platforms were extended. The South Eastern Railway took over the L&GR the following year and rebuilt the whole station again. The reconstruction work, which took place in March 1845, saw the demolition of the stairway and the building of a new internal stair approach from an arch in West Street (now Marine Street) next to the arch occupied by the booking office. The tracks were relaid to make them diverge slightly, providing room for an island platform about 10 feet (3.0 m) wide. A small shelter was constructed there with a roof 12 feet (3.7 m) above track level and projecting about 8 inches (20 cm) outwards, level with the sides of the carriages. A third-class passenger was killed on 1 April 1850 when he climbed part-way out of his open carriage and hit his head on the shelter's projecting roof as his Greenwich-bound train passed through the station. A subsequent Board of Trade enquiry recommended that steps should be taken to ensure that the "unruly class of passengers" found in third class should not have the "power to injure themselves" in future. In the same year, a small shelter for ticket collectors was erected on the Spa Road platform and trains to London Bridge were stopped there to carry out ticket collections before arriving at their destination. This arrangement continued until Charing Cross railway station was opened in 1864.

For some years local children exploited the ticket stops at Spa Road. The ticket collections meant that up trains had to stand there for some considerable time, close to the parapet wall and perfectly visible from street level. One regular traveller, Alfred Rosling Bennett, later recalled,

Gangs of children made it a practice, especially on summer evenings, without any apparent hindrance from the police, to attend every train and, standing at the junction of Rouel Road with Frean Street, to shout in chorus with a sort of cadence, "Throw down your mouldy coppers!" ... The chorus was repeated incessantly until the train moved on, unless coppers, mouldy or otherwise, arrived and then there would be a glorious tussle of boys and girls in desperate strife for the prize. Coppers were often thrown; if one passenger started and so afforded others a specimen battle, another was almost certain to follow and he, very likely, would be joined by a third, all perhaps in different carriages. When a train resumed its journey [the children] would play about in the neighbourhood until the next drew up.

=== Third station (1867–1915) ===
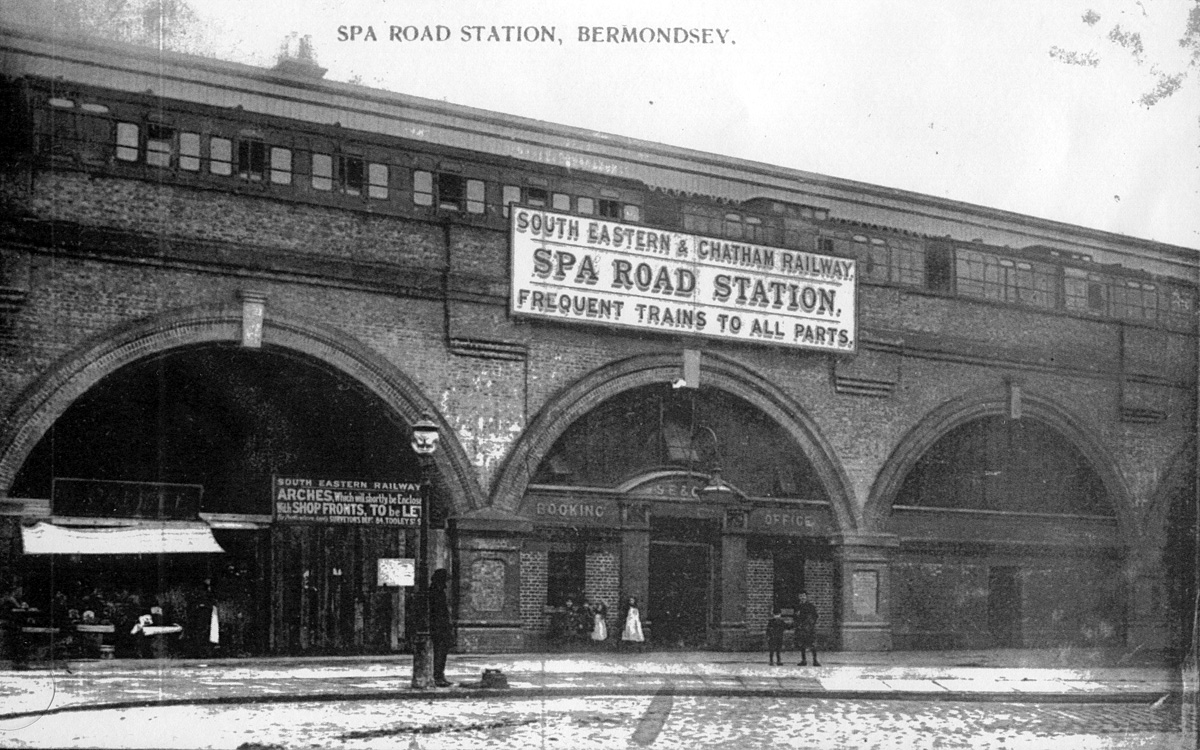
Spa Road station circa 1900

In 1867 the station was resited further along the viaduct about 200 yards (180 m) to the east, with an entrance accessed via what is now Priter Road. It was renamed as Spa Road & Bermondsey in October 1877 (though a photograph of about 1900 shows that it was still advertised as "Spa Road Station"). When the South Eastern and Chatham Railway was formed in 1899 from the South Eastern Railway and its bitter competitor, the London, Chatham and Dover Railway, the station was given another makeover. The current appearance of the station frontage dates from 1900.

On 15 March 1915, the station was closed, along with Southwark Park and Deptford stations, as a wartime economy measure. Only Deptford was subsequently reopened. Spa Road continued to be used by railwaymen until September 1925, when it ceased to be used by the railway.

== Closure ==
By the mid-1980s the old station had fallen into dereliction. It was left empty for many years, and the vacant land around it became a site for fly tipping of waste and rubbish. In 1986, British Rail, the Southwark Environment Trust and the London Borough of Southwark contributed £50,000 to restoration of the station frontage and installing two commemorative plaques. The station arches and the land in front of them were redeveloped into a light industrial estate behind a block of flats, accessed via Priter Road.

Parts of the station still exist; platform remnants are visible from trains travelling between Deptford or New Cross and London Bridge, and can easily be seen in satellite imagery. The frontage of the station is extant and displays the signage of the South Eastern and Chatham Railway. The site of the ticket windows is also visible. The disused platforms can still be reached via the old ticket office and have occasionally been used for emergency access. On 8 January 1999, when two commuter trains collided and derailed in the Spa Road Junction rail crash, some passengers had to be evacuated through the old station.

Spa Road railway station today
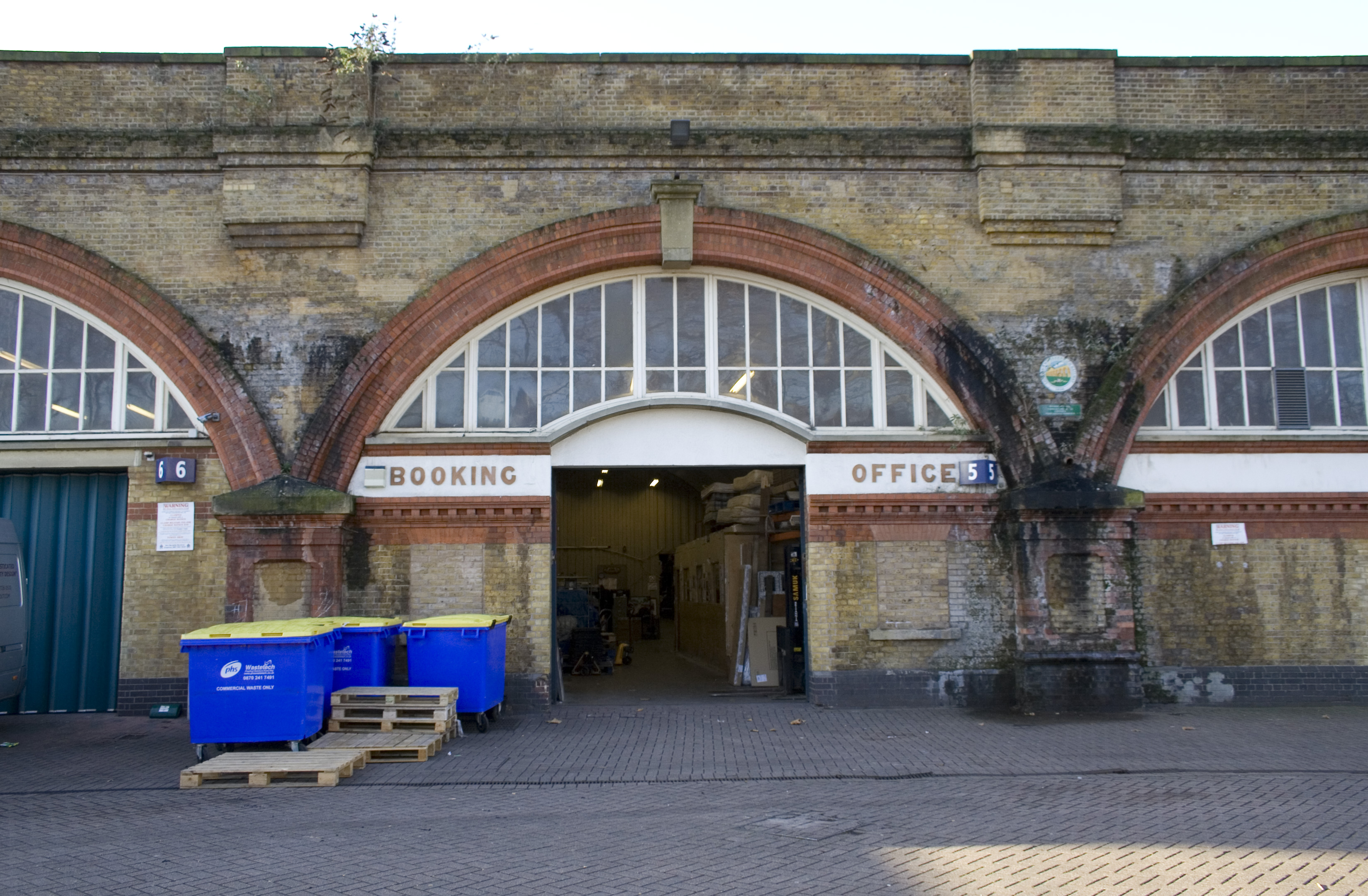
Site of the old station booking office; the bricked-up ticket windows are still visible

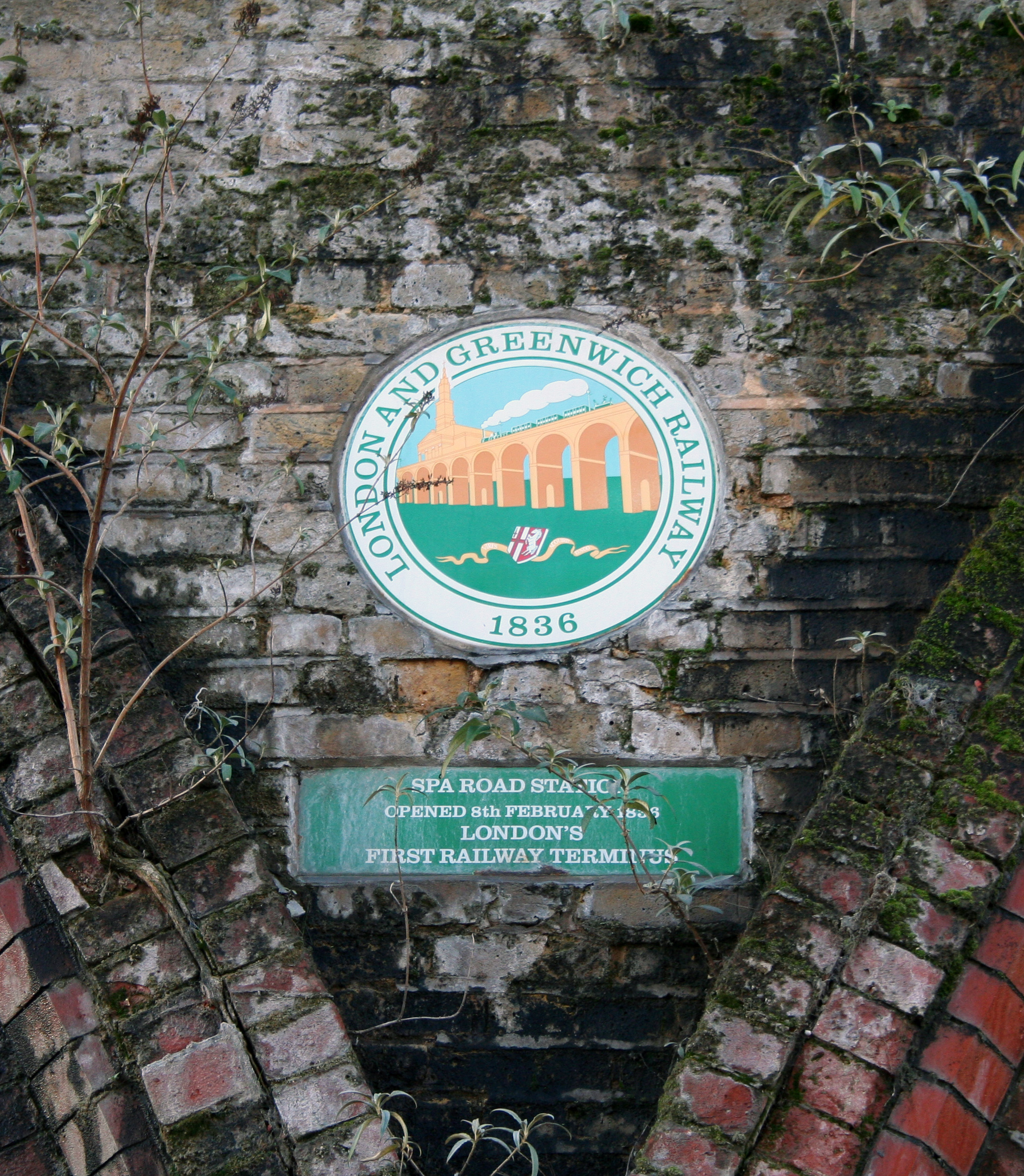
Plaque at Spa Road railway station commemorating the station and the London & Greenwich Railway

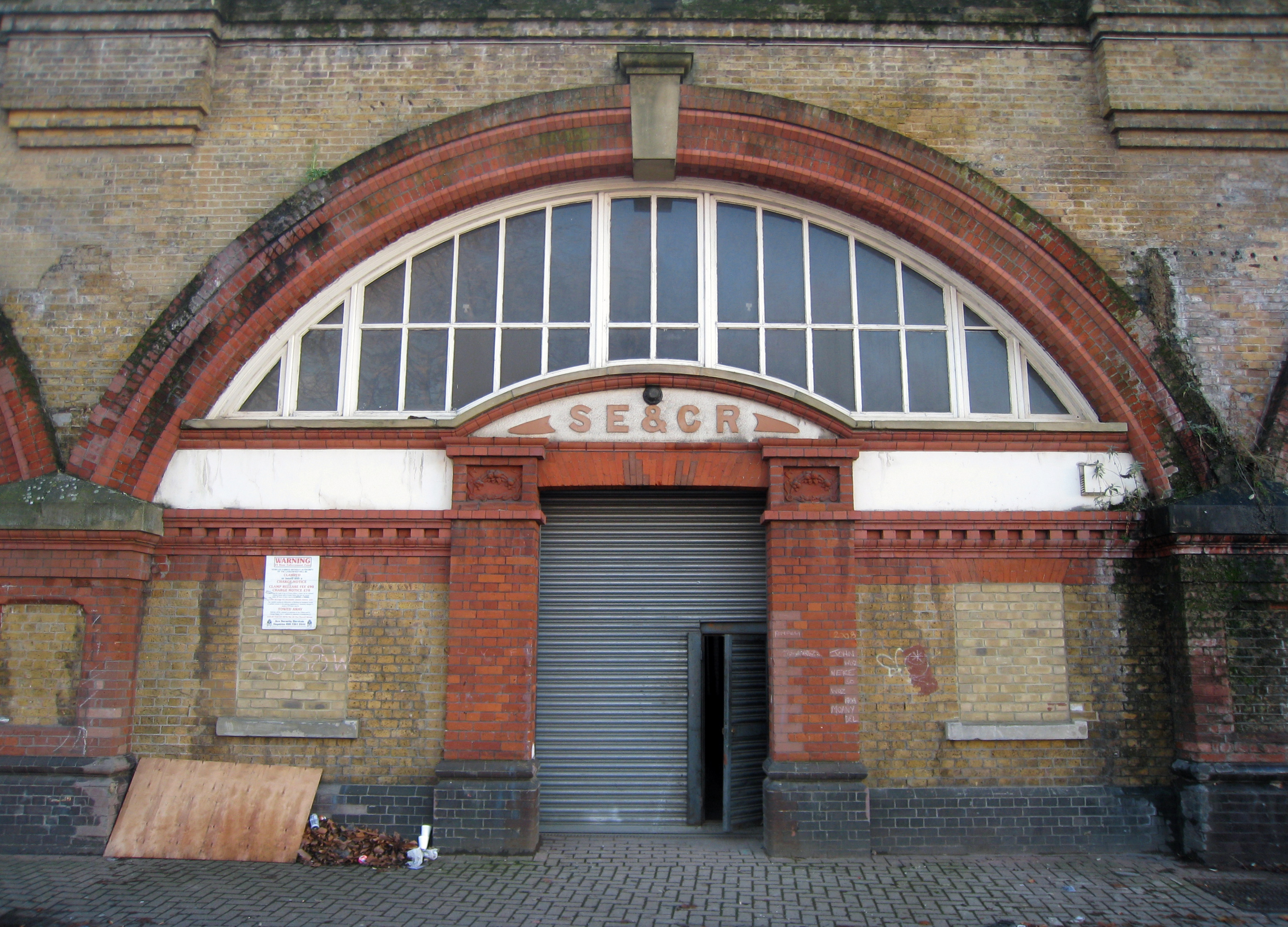
Former entrance to the station with the South Eastern and Chatham Railway initials above the doorway

== Spa Terminus ==
Monmouth Coffee Company, Neal's Yard Dairy and the property company Matching Green formed Spa Terminus Limited to take a lease on a stretch of railway arches around Spa Road station in Bermondsey to provide accommodation for food manufacturers and wholesalers. Monmouth Coffee Company and Neal's Yard Dairy moved their headquarters into arches at Spa Terminus in 2018.

Preceding station	Historical railways	Following station
London Bridge	South Eastern and Chatham Railway Greenwich Line	Southwark Park
