= Street names of Covent Garden =

List of London Covent Garden street names etymologies

This is a list of the etymology of street names in the London district of Covent Garden. Covent Garden has no formally defined boundaries – those utilised here are: Shaftesbury Avenue to the north-west, New Oxford Street and High Holborn to the north, Kingsway and the western half of the Aldwych semi-circle to the east, Strand to the south and Charing Cross Road to the west.

Several names here are related to Francis Russell, 4th Earl of Bedford (1587–1641), who built much of the area.

- Adelaide Street – after Adelaide of Saxe-Meiningen, wife of King William IV (the street was laid out in 1818 when he was still a prince)
- Agar Street – after George Agar, who built the street in the 1830s with John Ponsonby, Earl of Bessborough
- Aldwych – from Old English ‘Ealdwic’ or ‘Aldwic’, meaning ‘old settlement’, given by Anglo-Saxons referring to a Danish settlement here of the 9th century
- Arne Street – after the 18th century composer Thomas Arne, who was born near here
- Banbury Court – after Nicholas Knollys, 3rd Earl of Banbury, who owned a house here called Banbury House
- Bedfordbury – presumably after Lord Bedford
- Bedford Court and Bedford Street – after the 4th Earl of Bedford
- Betterton Street – after Thomas Betterton, prominent actor of the 17th century
- Bow Street – after its curving bow-like shape
- Broad Court – a descriptive name
- Brydges Place – after Giles Brydges, 3rd Baron Chandos, father-in-law of the 4th Earl of Bedford
- Bull Inn Court – formerly led to the Bull Inn which stood on Strand
- Burleigh Street – site of a house belonging to William Cecil, 1st Baron Burghley, Secretary of State to Elizabeth I
- Cambridge Circus – after Prince George, 2nd Duke of Cambridge, who formally opened the new development of Charing Cross Road in 1887
- Catherine Street – after Catherine of Braganza, queen of Charles II, reigning monarch when the street was laid out
- Cecil Court – after the Cecil family, earls of Salisbury, who owned this land from the 17th century on
- Chandos Place – after Giles Brydges, 3rd Baron Chandos, father-in-law of the 4th Earl of Bedford
- Charing Cross Road – built 1887, and named as it led to the cross at Charing, from the Old English word "cierring", referring to a bend in the River Thames
- Ching Court – after the Comyn Ching Co., a former ironmongers near here
- Conduit Court – thought to be named after Leonard Cunditt/Conduit, an innholder in Long Acre in the 1600s
- Covent Garden – corruption of ‘Convent Garden’, after the gardens belonging to Abbey of St Peter, Westminster in the 1200s
- Cranbourn Street – built in the 1670s and named after local landowner the Earl of Salisbury, Viscount Cranbourn (or Cranbourne) after the town in Dorset
- Crown Court – from the former Crown Inn, which stood on the corner with Russell Street
- Cubitt's Yard – presumably after either William Cubitt, Lord Mayor of London (1860–1862) or Thomas Cubitt, 19th century street developer
- Dragon Yard – unknown; nb: street is no longer signed
- Drury Lane – an old street, renamed in honour of Sir William (or Robert) Drury in the 16th century who owned a house at the southern end of the street
- Dryden Street – after the 17th century poet John Dryden, who lives nearby and whose poem-dramas were often performed in the theatres nearby
- Duncannon Street – after John Ponsonby, 5th Earl of Bessborough and later Baron Duncannon of Bessborough, who built the street with George Agar in the 1830s
- Dunn's Passage
- Earlham Street – formerly two streets – Great and Little Earl Street, later renamed to avoid confusion with various other Earl Streets; which earl it commemorated is unknown
- Endell Street – named after the rector of St Giles, James Endell Tyler in 1846
- Exchange Court – opened in the mid-17th century opposite the New Exchange (covered row of shops)
- Exeter Street – site of a house belonging to William Cecil, 1st Baron Burghley, whose son later became earl of Exeter; laid out in 1676 following the demolition of the house
- Floral Street – renamed after the Floral Hall in 1895, both in reference to Covent Garden's flower markets. The street was formerly Hart Street, from the 16th century White Hart Inn
- Garrick Street and Garrick Yard – after David Garrick, successful actor of the 18th century
- Goodwin's Court
- Grape Street – formerly 'Vine Street', both in reference to a former vineyard on this site probably belonging to the former St Giles hospital
- Great Newport Street – after Mountjoy Blount, Earl of Newport (Isle of Wight), who owned a house on what is now Chinatown's Little Newport Street (then just Newport Street) in the 17th century. Following the construction of Charing Cross Road Newport Street was split in two and the two sections renamed as they are today
- Great Queen Street – laid out in the 16th century and named in honour of the contemporary royal family; the ‘Great’ prefix was added to contrast with Little Queen Street which formerly adjoined
- Hanover Place – after the Royal House of Hanover; formerly Phoenix Place
- Heathcock Court – thought to be after a former inn of this name
- Henrietta Street – named after Henrietta Maria, consort of Charles I, reigning king when the street was built in 1631
- High Holborn – thought to be from ‘hollow bourne’ i.e. the river Fleet which formerly flowed in a valley near here. The ‘High’ stems from the fact that the road led away from the river to higher ground.
- Hop Gardens – the abbey of St Peter used gardens near here to grow hops in the early Middle Ages
- Inigo Place – after Inigo Jones, who designed much of the Covent Garden area in the 1630s
- James Street – named after Prince James, later James II, son of Charles I who was reigning king when this street was built in the 1630s
- Kean Street – after Edmund Kean, successful Shakespearian actor of the 19th century, and his actor son Charles Kean
- Keeley Street – after Robert Keeley, successful actor and comedian of the 19th century
- Kemble Street – after the Kemble family, who were active in the local theatre community in the 18th and 19th centuries
- King Street – named after Charles I, king when this street was built in the 1630s
- Langley Court and Langley Street – after Sir Roger Langley, who owned land here in the early 18th century
- Lazenby Court
- Litchfield Street – unknown, though possibly after Edward Lee, 1st Earl of Lichfield, who was brother-in-law of Henry FitzRoy, 1st Duke of Grafton and son of Charles II, or Charlotte Lee, Countess of Lichfield, daughter of Charles II
- Long Acre – after the garden/field of the abbey of St Peter; the road was laid out in 1615
- Lumley Court
- Macklin Street – after Charles Macklin, 18th century actor
- Maiden Lane – not known, but thought to be from a shop of inn containing the word ‘maiden’ that formerly stood here; the names dates to 1636, or perhaps after midden heaps
- Martlett Court – thought to be a corruption of St Martin's, from St Martin-in-the-Fields church
- Matthews Yard
- Mays Court – after Henry May, local property owner in the 18th century, built by his family after his death
- Mercer Street – after the Worshipful Company of Mercers, who owned a field near here in the 14th century; it was formerly three streets – Great and Little White Lion Street, along with Mercer Street
- Monmouth Street – after James Scott, 1st Duke of Monmouth, son of Charles II who owned a house on nearby Soho Square; it was formerly two streets – Great and Little St Andrew's Street
- Museum Street – after the British Museum to which it leads
- Neal Street and Neal's Yard – after Thomas Neale, who laid out the Seven Dials development in 1693; Neal Street was formerly King Street, and Neal's Yard formerly King's Head Court
- New Oxford Street – built as an extension of Oxford Street in 1845-47
- New Row – formerly New Street, built in 1635-37 as a new replacement for an existing alley
- Newton Street – after William Newton, who built the street and the nearby Lincoln's inn Fields in the 1630s
- Nottingham Court – after Heneage Finch, 1st Earl of Nottingham, who owned a house nearby in the 17th century
- Odham's Walk
- Old Brewer's Yard – presumably after an old brewery here
- Parker Mews and Parker Street – from Philip Parker, a local resident in the 17th century
- Princes Circus
- Rose Street
- Russell Street – after Francis Russell, 4th Earl of Bedford

- St Martin's Court, St Martin's Courtyard and St Martin's Lane, St Martin-in-the-Fields Church Path and St Martin's Place – after St Martin-in-the-Fields church adjacent
- Seven Dials and Seven Dials Court – after the seven dials on the sundial column, and the seven adjoining streets; laid out by Thomas Neale in 1693
- Shelton Street – after William Shelton, who provided money for a local charitable school for the poor on nearby Parker Street in his will in the 17th century
- Shorts Gardens – after the Short family, who owned a house near here in the 17th century; it was formerly Queen Street
- Slingsby Place – after Sir William Slingsby, who purchased this land in the 17th century
- Smart's Place – probably from William Smart, a carpenter who lived near here in the early 18th century
- Southampton Street – after the earls of Southampton, who owned Southampton House in Bloomsbury in the 16th century; Edward Russell, 3rd Earl of Bedford and local landowner, married a daughter and heiress of the Southamptons, and this street was named in her/their honour
- Strand and Strand Lane – from Old English ‘stond’, meaning the edge of a river; the river Thames formerly reached here prior to the building of the Thames Embankment
- Stukeley Street – after William Stukeley, clergyman and archaeologist, who lived nearby in the 18th century
- Tavistock Court and Tavistock Street – from the Russell family, Dukes of Bedford, Marquesses of Tavistock, etc., owners of Covent Garden from the 16th century, whose Devonshire estate comprised the former lands of Tavistock Abbey which they acquired at the Dissolution of the Monasteries, together with Covent Garden, a possession of Westminster Abbey.
- Tower Court and Tower Street – named after a former inn on this site, closed 1848; Tower Court was formerly Lumber Court
- Wellington Street – after Arthur Wellesley, 1st Duke of Wellington
- West Street – unknown, possibly it was on the western boundary of St Gile's parish; formerly Hog Street
- West Central Street – named in 1894, after the recent innovation of postcodes (this being the boundary between WC1 and WC1)
- Wild Court and Wild Street – corruption of ‘Weld’, after Henry Weld who lived in Weld House on this site in the 17th century
- William IV Street – named after William IV, reigning king when the street was laid out by John Nash in 1831
