= Earlham Street Market =

London Street Market

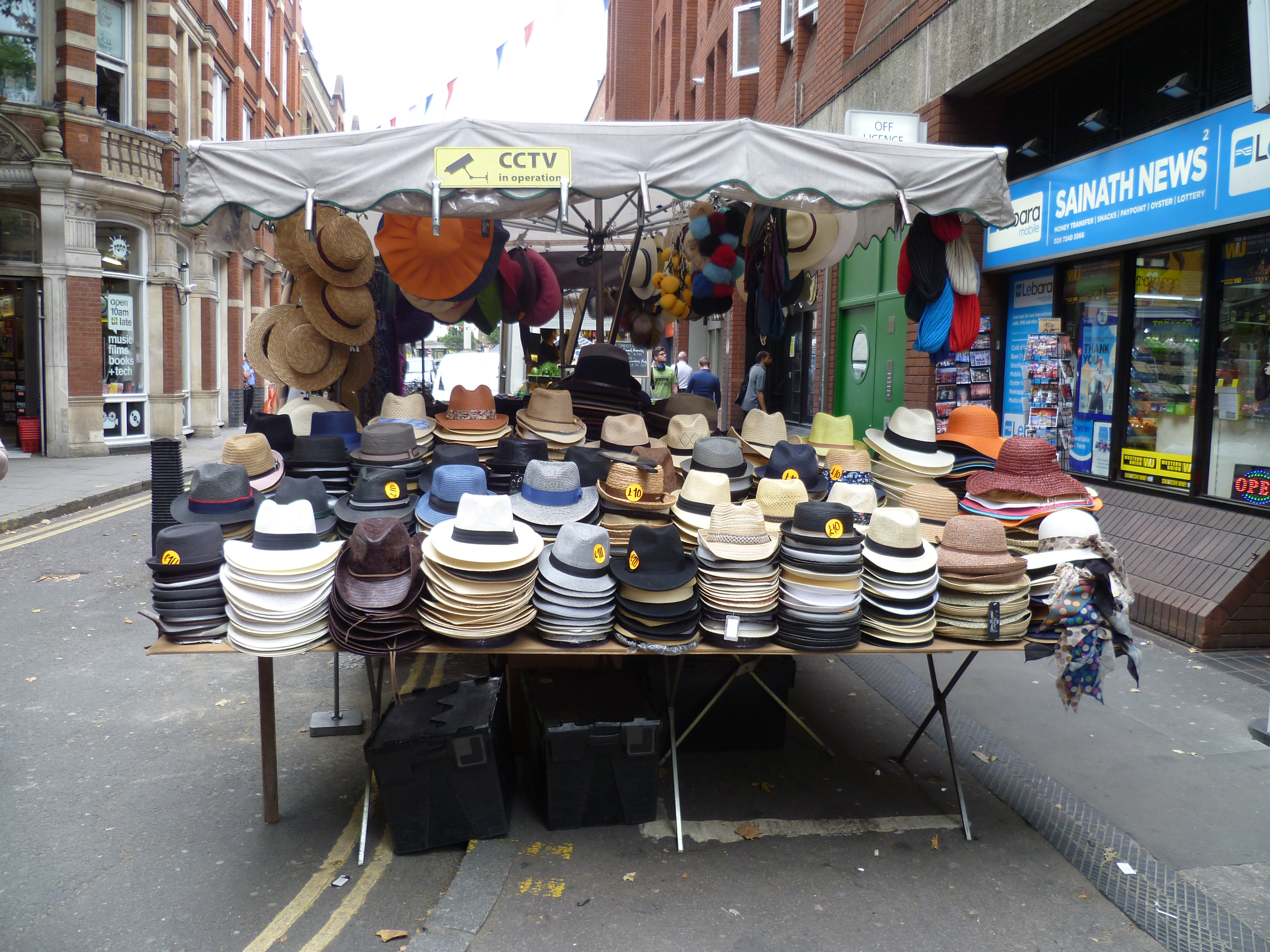
- A hat stall on Earlham Street market
- Location: Earlham Street; Covent Garden, Camden, Greater London; 51.5138°N 0.1261°W
- Opening date: 1710 (316 years ago)
- Management: Camden London Borough Council
- Owner: Camden London Borough Council
- Environment: Outdoor
- Goods sold: General goods, food
- Days normally open: Monday–Saturday
- Number of tenants: 24
- Website: www.camden.gov.uk/markets
- Location within London Borough of Camden

Earlham Street Market is a street market in situated in the Seven Dials area of Covent Garden on a short road between Shaftesbury Avenue and Monmouth Street. Licences to trade are issued by Camden London Borough Council.

The market has street food and clothing for sale.

It has 24 pitches and is open from Monday to Saturday, 10.00 to 16.00.

== History ==
=== Early history (1710–1867) ===
The street was completed in 1710 and it is likely that the market dates from then. Unregulated street markets allowed London to grow explosively in the late 19th and early 20th centuries. The traders could move easily to the new population centres and enabled people to buy provisions without having to travel to the central London wholesale markets. In the early morning traders would load their barrows at the wholesale markets, clean and sort the goods, and then sell them in the new suburban streets. In many cases, the sites of these markets became London's modern high streets.

=== Management by the police (1867–1927) ===
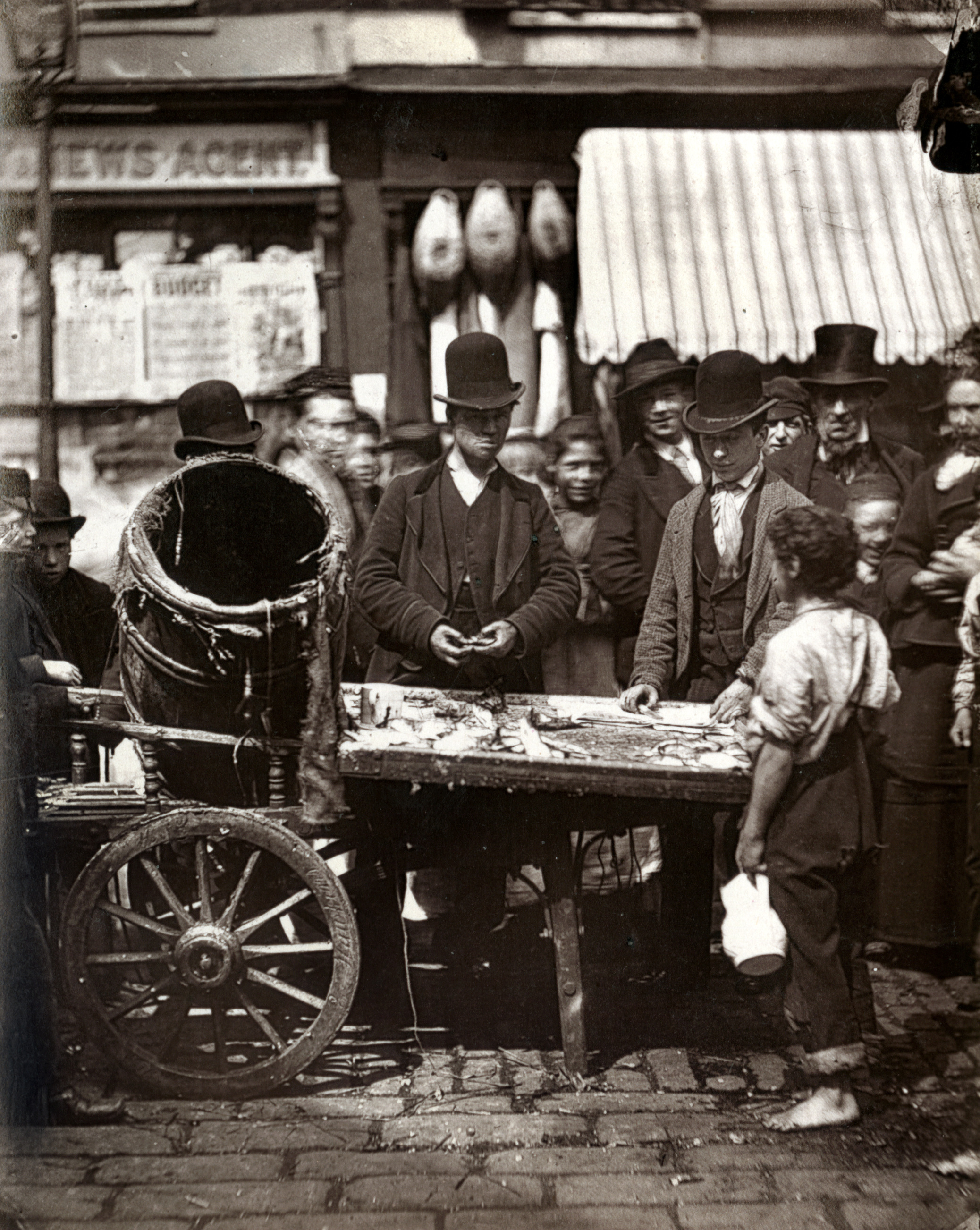
Fisher seller on Earlham Street in the 1870s

In 1867, section six of the Metropolitan Streets Act effectively prohibited street trading. Following public meetings and press criticism, the act was amended within weeks. Section one of the Metropolitan Streets Act Amendment Act 1867 exempted traders but they were now subject to regulation by the police.

In 1877 Adolphe Thompson describes the market as crowded with traders and being between the Seven Dials and Five Dials (now demolished to make way for Shaftesbury Avenue).

In 1892 the market consisted of 41 stalls of which 12 were operated by shopkeepers and the remainder by independent street traders. The market was greatly diminished from its former size.

The Market is described as "having existed beyond memory" and being "a marketing centre for the district".

=== Management by local councils (1927–present) ===
==== Metropolitan Borough of Holborn (1927–1965) ====
The London County Council (General Powers) Act 1927 replaced police regulation with a new licensing regime administered by metropolitan borough councils. From 1927 to 1965 the market was managed by the Metropolitan Borough of Holborn.

==== London Borough of Camden (1965–present) ====
In 1965 the Borough of Holborn was abolished and its area became part of the London Borough of Camden.

Perlmutter records the market having 22 pitches in 1983 but that they were largely unoccupied. He lists fresh seafood, antiques, and vintage records for sale.

In the mid-1990s the market is described as consisting of 12 stalls selling army surplus, clothing new and second hand, wooden toys, and recorded music.

== Transport ==
=== Bus ===
Bus Routes 14, 19, 24, 29, and 176.

=== Railway and tube ===
The nearest stations are Covent Garden and Leicester Square.
