= The Crown, Covent Garden =

Pub in Covent Garden, London

Coordinates: 51.51395°N 0.12685°W

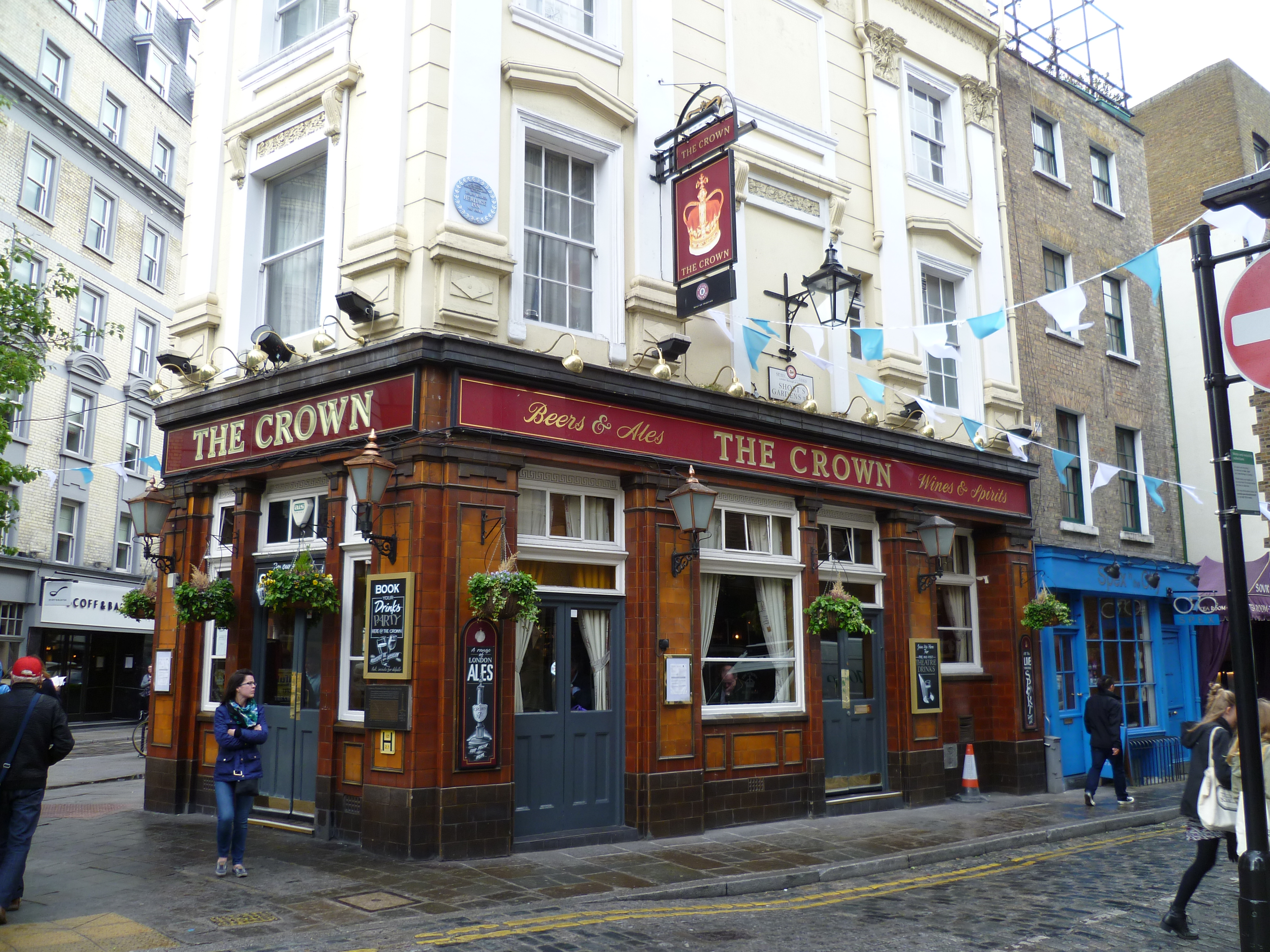
The Crown, Monmouth Street, Covent Garden (2015)

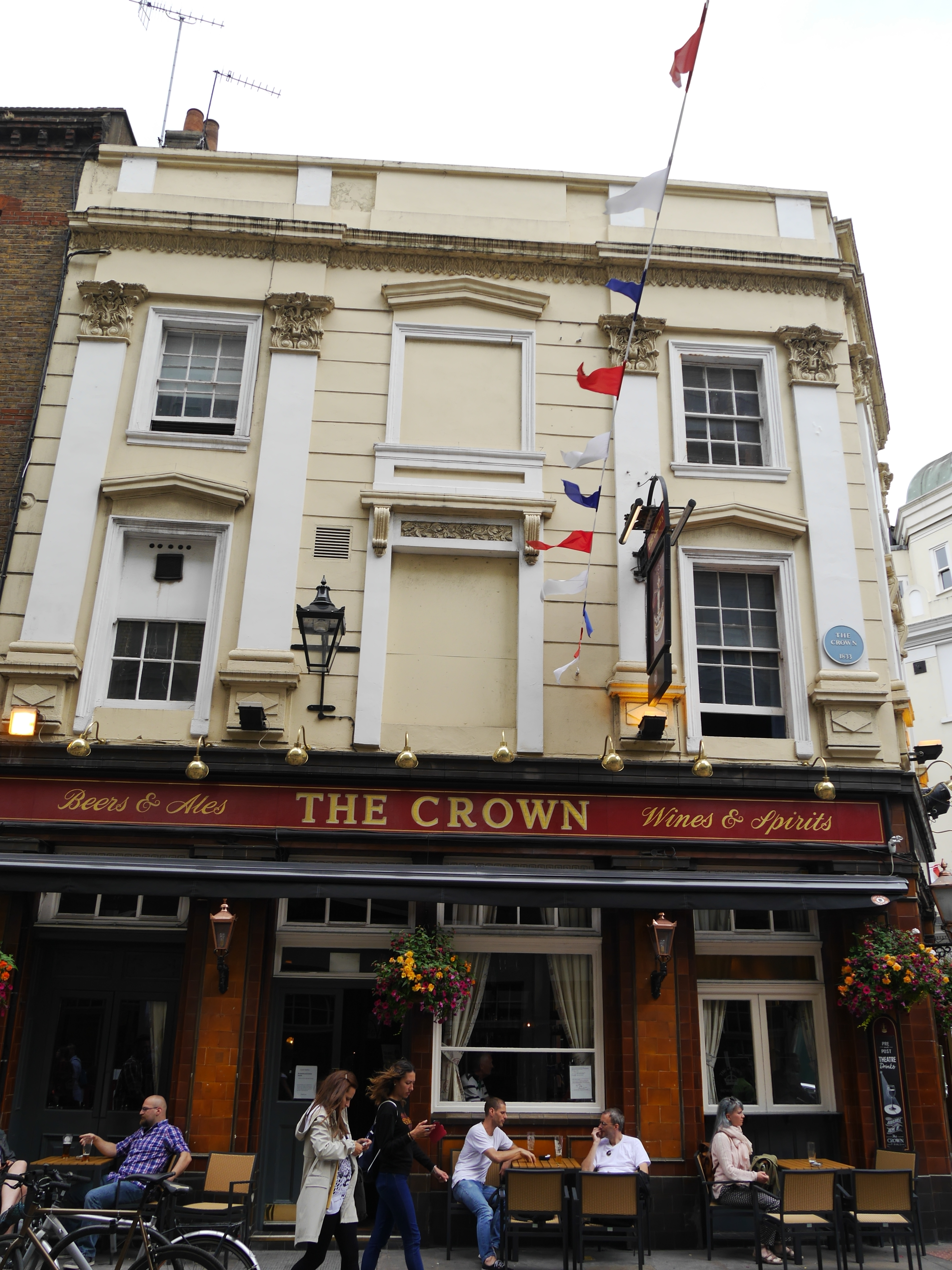
The Crown, Monmouth Street, Covent Garden (2016)

The Crown is a pub in Covent Garden, London, at 43 Monmouth Street facing on to Seven Dials and Short's Gardens.

The pub was established in 1833. The ceramic tiling outside is original.

It was known as The Clock House in the time of Charles Dickens, when it was a "hot bed of villainy", in an area well known for prostitutes and pickpockets.

The pub was part of the Taylor Walker pub chain. It is now owned by the pub chain Greene King.
