= Covent Garden Hotel =

Hotel in London

Coordinates: 51.51453°N 0.12706°W

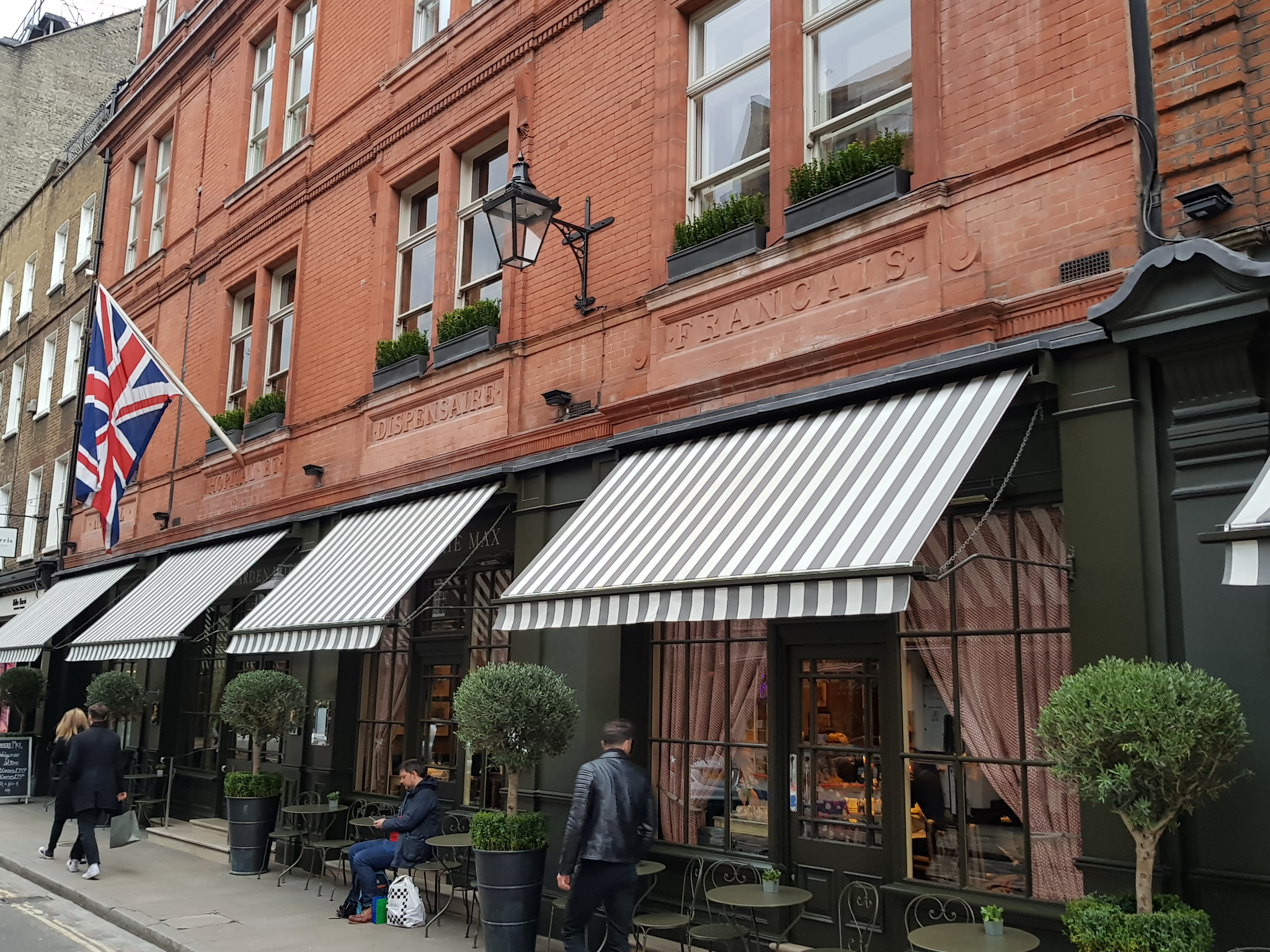

- Location within Central London

General information
- Location: 10 Monmouth Street; London WC2H 9HB, England

Other information
- Number of rooms: 58

Website
- https://www.firmdalehotels.com/hotels/covent-garden-hotel

Covent Garden Hotel is a 5-star hotel in London, England. It is located in Monmouth Street, near Seven Dials in the West End, a short walk away from the Royal Opera House, and is surrounded by some 21 theatres. The hotel is part of Tim and Kit Kemp's Firmdale Hotels.

== Style ==
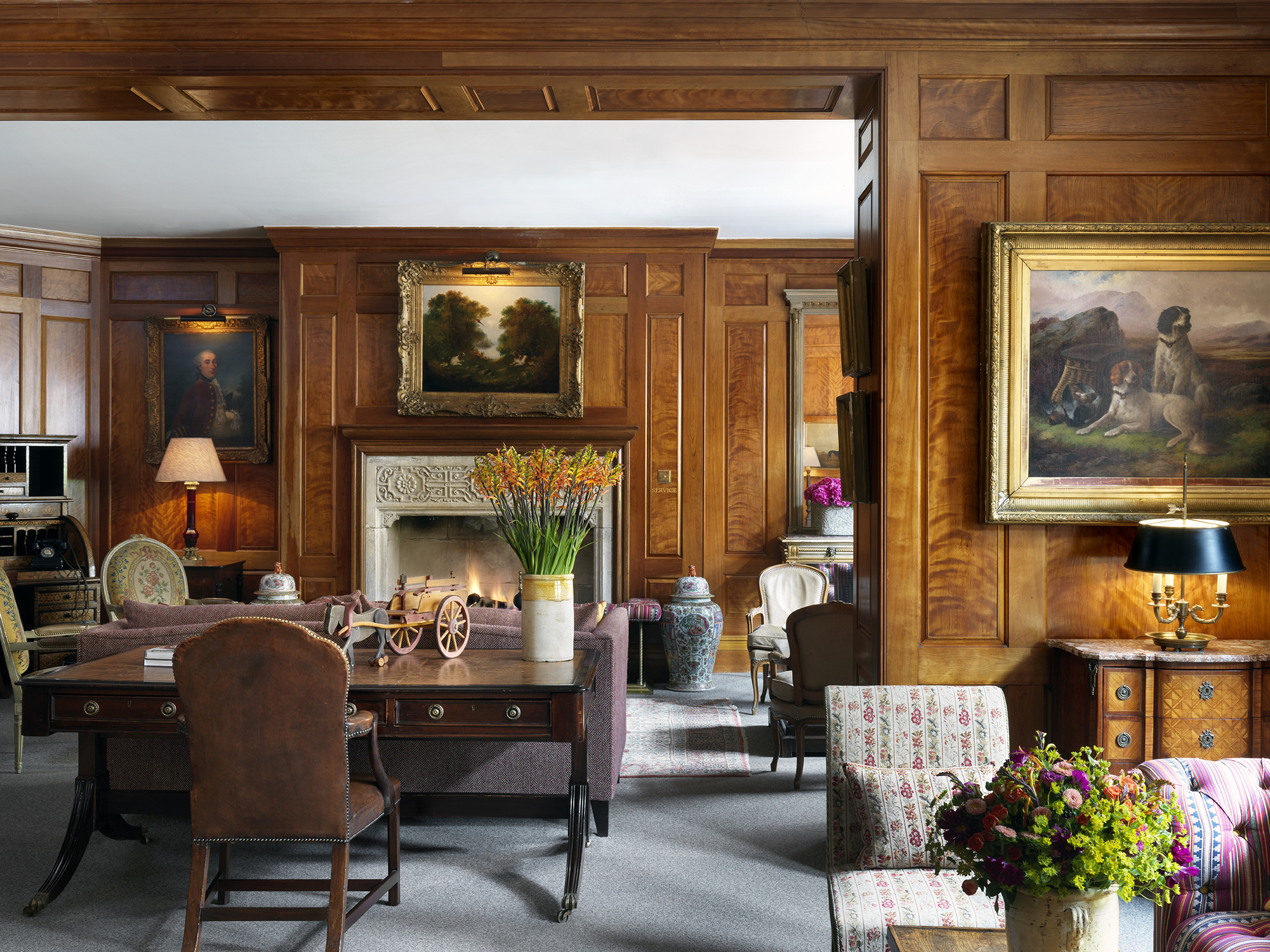
Drawing room

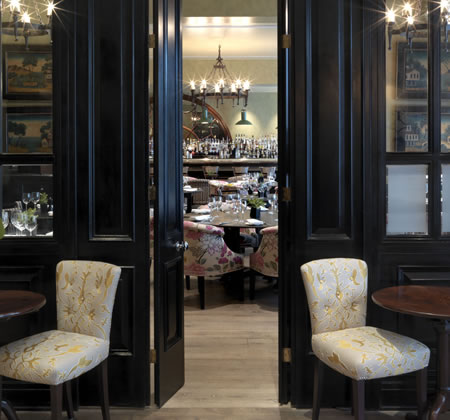
Brasserie Max Restaurant & Bar

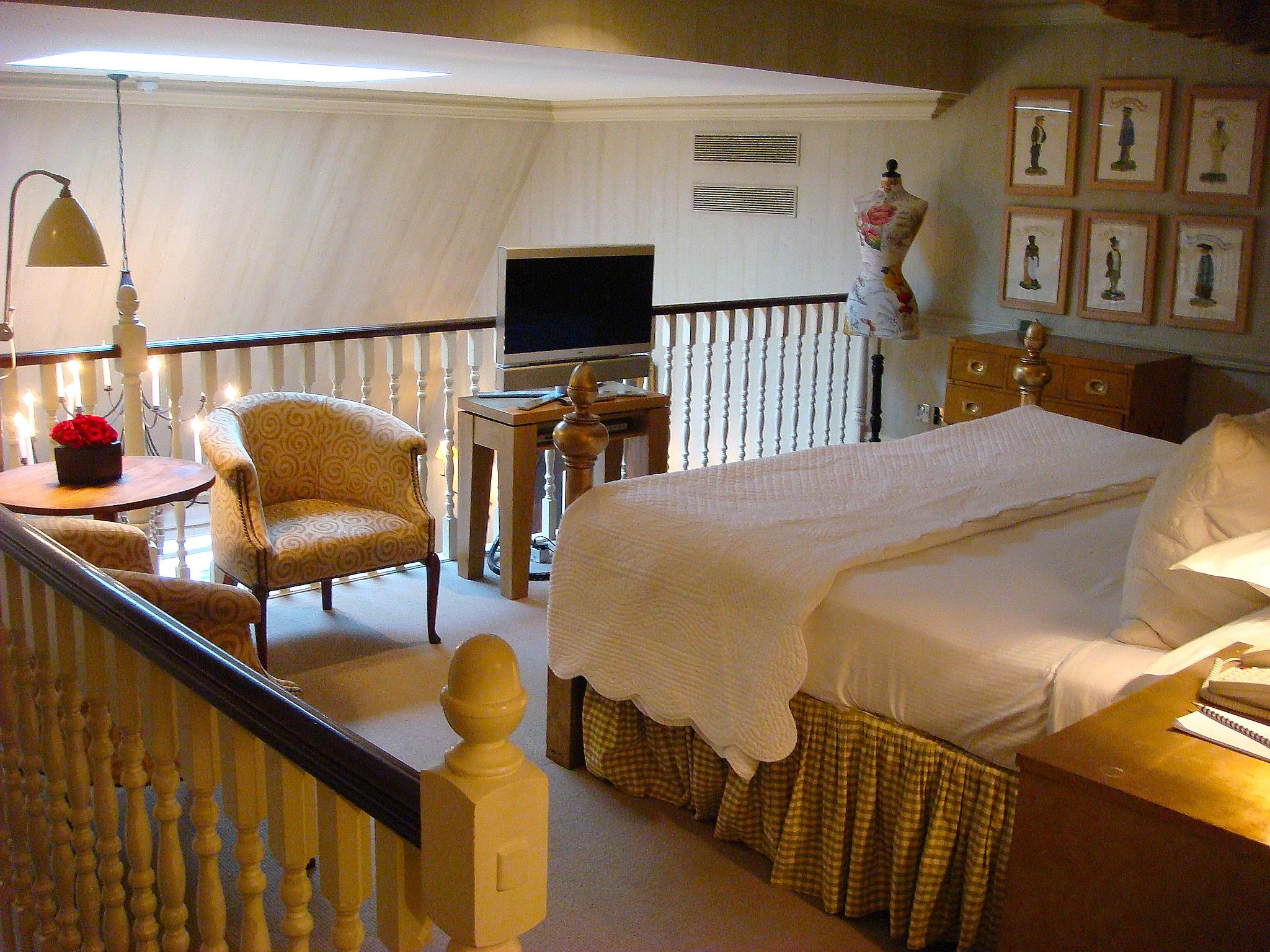
Attic suite

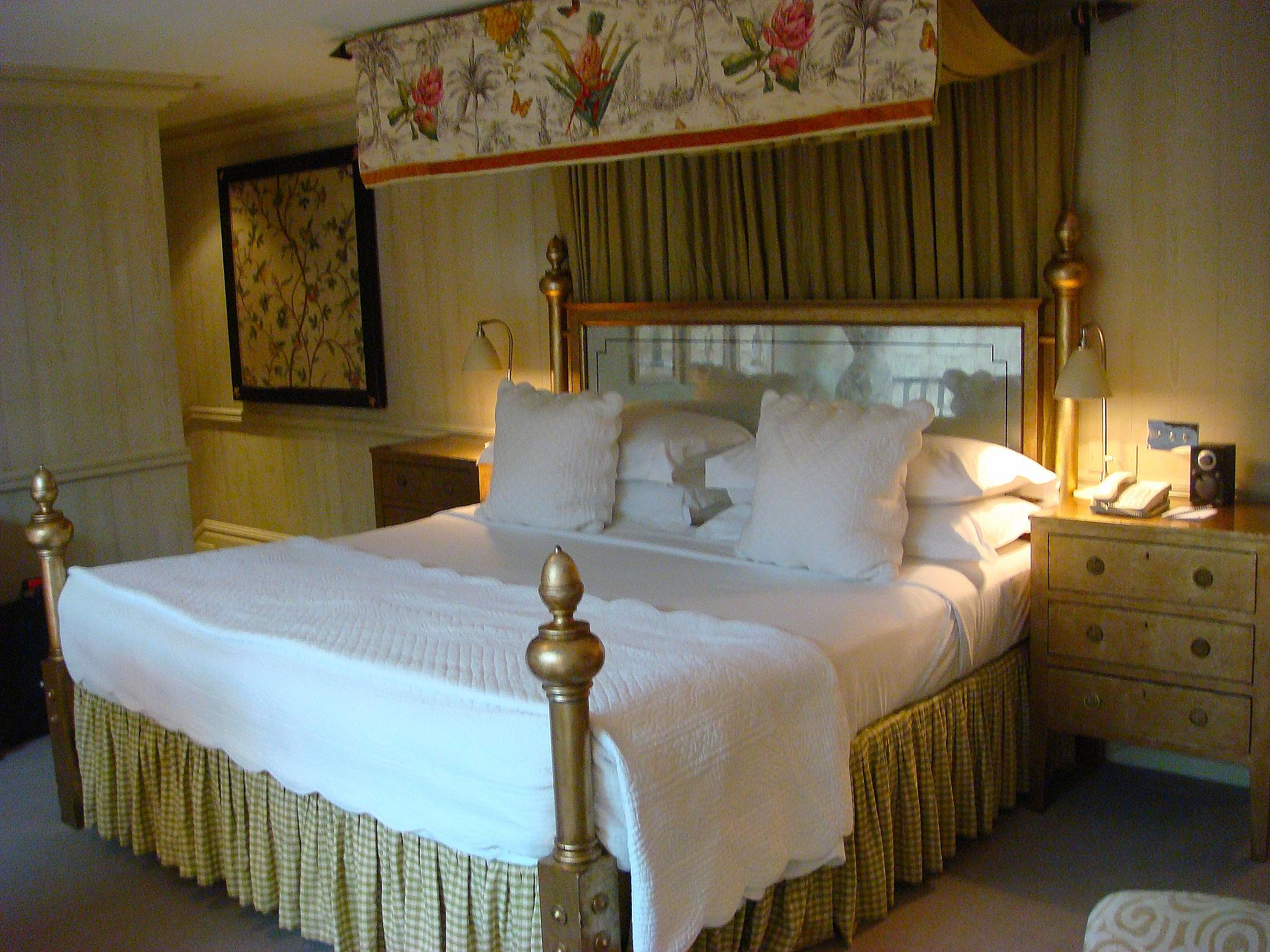

The hotel's 58 bedrooms and suites are designed by co-owner and creative director Kit Kemp. At the reception, there are large curtains and aged wood furnishings. Stone stairs lead up to the first-floor drawing room which has maple-wood panelling. The Tiffany's Library is also located on the first floor and has a fireplace and bar. The hotel has three private dining rooms, a private 47-seat screening room, and a restaurant called Brasserie Max, with a pewter bar with an arched mirror. The bedrooms are elegant, with floral motifs, and they have bathrooms made of granite and mahogany. The hotel also has a gym and a spa.

== Notable guests ==
The hotel frequently attracts notable guests. Musician Courtney Love stayed at the hotel in 2007, actor Simon Russell Beale in 2002, The lobby and restaurant of the hotel were used as filming locations in the 2005 film Match Point; Scarlett Johansson, one of that film's main actors, also stayed there. Other well-known guests include the director Peter Jackson, actors Tim Robbins, Meryl Streep, Stockard Channing, Stephen Fry, Geoffrey Rush, Robert De Niro, Kiefer Sutherland and Kate Winslet.
