= Mercers Arms, Covent Garden =

Former pub in Covent Garden, London, England

Coordinates: 51.51320°N 0.12635°W

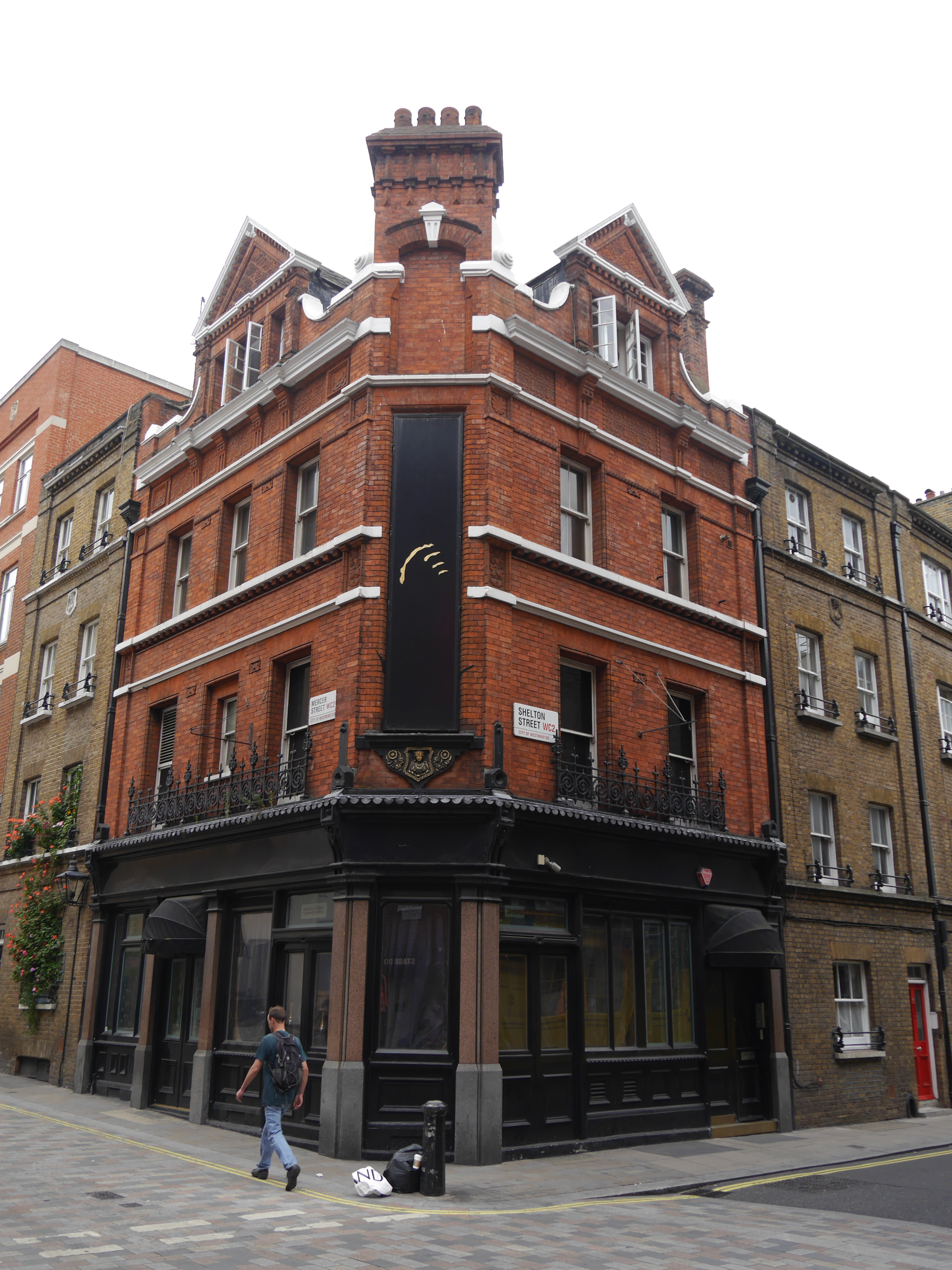
The Mercers' Arms, 2016

The Mercers' Arms was a pub at 17 Mercer Street, in London's Covent Garden, at the corner with Shelton Street. It closed as a pub in about 1973, and is now a private dining club.

The earliest recorded landlord is a Robert Abraham in 1792, and the 1797 insurance document for the then landlord, Alexander Ogston, is held in the National Archives.
