= The Drinker (Banksy) =

2004 statue in London

- Artist: Banksy
- Year: 2004
- Medium: Metal
- Condition: Stolen
- Location: London, United Kingdom; 51°31′00″N 0°07′35″W

The Drinker is a statue by graffiti artist Banksy, depicting Rodin's The Thinker with a traffic cone on its head.

== History ==
In 2004, the statue was placed in a small square at Princes Circus on Shaftesbury Avenue between New Oxford Street and High Holborn in central London. It is a subversive comment using The Thinker by Auguste Rodin.

In March 2004, The Drinker was stolen by "art terrorist" and football hooligan Andy Link (also known as AK47), a former porn star with an arrest record and a record of drug charges.

Around a year after Link took The Drinker, Link says he registered "the lost and found item" with police, and contacted Banksy, asking for £5,000, or an original canvas, "to cover costs".

In 2007, three years after Link stole it, the sculpture was taken from Link's garden, while he was away.

In December 2015, Link re-installed, as The Stinker, "an imitation of Banksy's sculpture" The Drinker, modified with a toilet seat, cistern and graffiti, in central London.

The Stinker (2015) was a commissioned work from sculptor Emmanuel Okoro.

The 2016 crowdfunded documentary (with "dream-reenactment sequence", "amusing artifice") film The Banksy Job is about Andy Link and the work.

== See also ==
- List of works by Banksy
