= Earlham Street =

Street in Covent Garden, London

Coordinates: 51°30′49.24″N 0°7′39″W

Earlham Street is a street in Covent Garden, in the London Borough of Camden that runs from Shaftesbury Avenue in the west to Neal Street in the east, crossing Seven Dials midway, where it intersects with Monmouth Street, Mercer Street, and Shorts Gardens. Tower Street and Tower Court join it on its south side.

Earlham Street Market operates from the street.

== History ==
The street was originally two separate streets. The part east of Seven Dials was called Great Earl Street, and the part west of Seven Dials Little Earl Street. In the 1930s the whole street was renamed Earlham Street.

== Buildings ==
Seven Dials Jazz Club is at number 46, opposite the Donmar Warehouse. The Cambridge Theatre, a West End theatre, is on a corner site.

== Residents ==
Syd Barrett once lived at number 2.

== In popular culture ==
In the 1970s, Adidas released a shoe that is named after the street.
