= Mercer Street, London =

Street in Covent Garden, London

Coordinates: 51.5140°N 0.1274°W

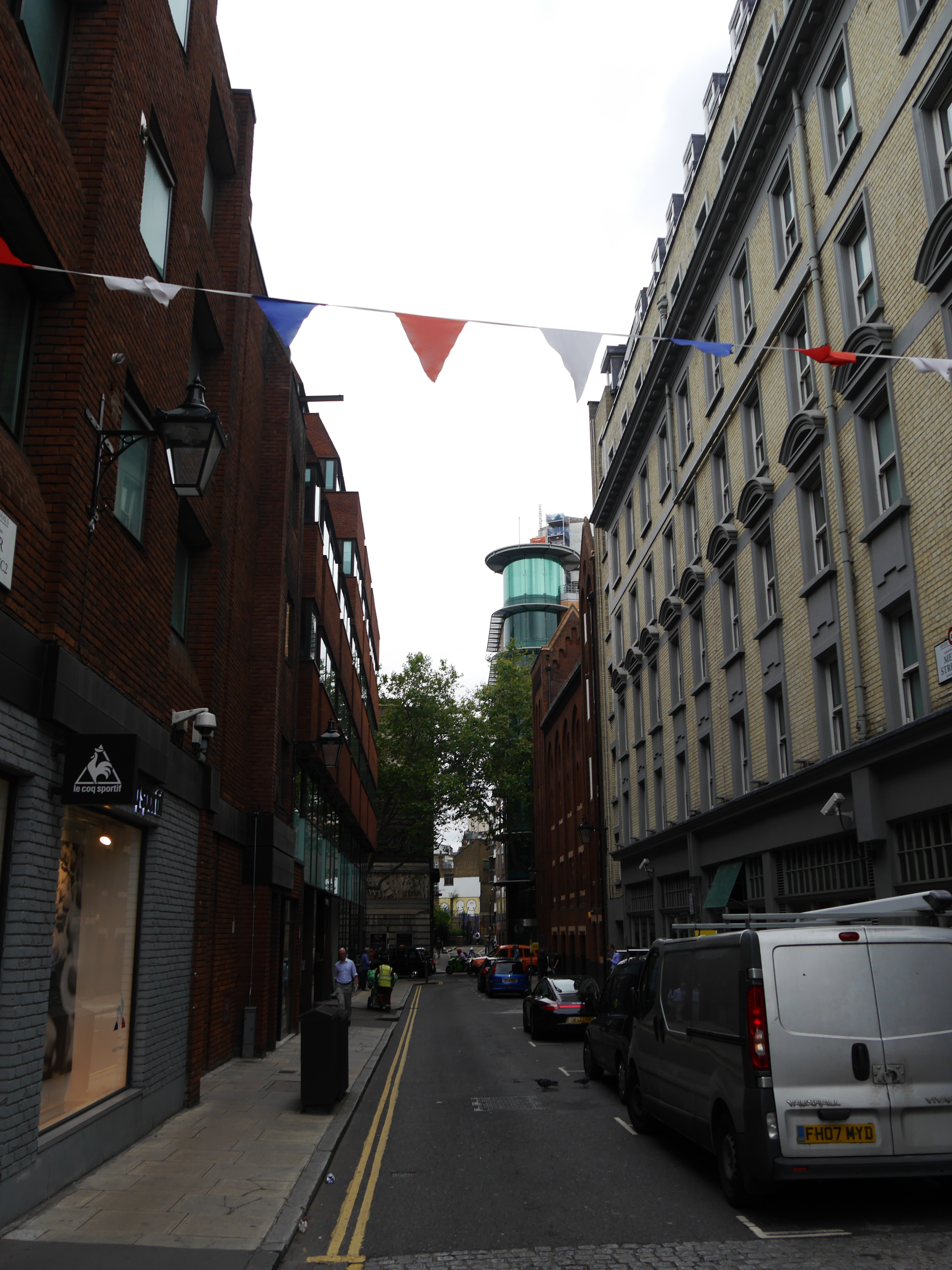
Mercer Street, London

Mercer Street is a street in the Seven Dials district of Covent Garden, London, England.

Mercer Street runs south east to north west from Long Acre to Shaftesbury Avenue, crossing Shelton Street. About two-thirds up, it meets Seven Dials, where it intersects with Monmouth Street, Earlham Street, and Shorts Gardens.

The street takes its name from the Mercers' Company, who owned much of the land next to the seven acres of Covent Garden purchased by the Earl of Bedford in 1552.

Originally, the name Mercer Street was only given to the section between Long Acre and Shelton Street; the section from Shelton Street to Seven Dials was called Little White Lion Street, and the section from Seven Dials to Shaftesbury Avenue was called Great White Lion Street. In the 1930s the name Mercer Street was given to the whole street.

Freed of London manufactured pointe shoes for ballet dancers in Mercer Street from 1947 until 1971, when production moved to Well Street, Hackney.
