= Elizabeth Beverley =

English pamphleteer 1792–1832

Elizabeth Beverley (1792 – 19 November 1832, in Lambeth) was a travelling English entertainer and pamphleteer, who sometimes wrote as Mrs. R. Beverley.

== Life ==
Nothing is known for certain of Beverley's private life, but she was travelling about the West Country by 1814, and must have been born before the end of the 18th century, even if her stage career began very early. From the date on the last extant reprint of a pamphlet of hers it can be assumed that she was still alive in 1831. It is not known who R. Beverley was, but his wife wrote a poem on "my Child's being unfortunately burnt to death," implying that grief at this hastened her husband's death as well.

== Writings ==
One of Beverley's works, Modern Times (1818) was prompted by the death in childbirth of Princess Charlotte of Wales, the only child of the future King George IV, taking the form of a sermon on the text of Jeremiah 5:29, "Shall I not visit for these things? saith the LORD: shall not my soul be avenged on such a nation as this?" Others, in verse or prose, comment on a child's death, on the value to women of male applause, and on publisher/author relations (a writer beaten down to £5 for his work later managing to obtain £200 for it by subscription).

The prose Veluti in speculum (1827) consists of letters on subjects such as singing in church, managing a theatre, and the importance of elocution, addressed to "Mira". The author notes in her long subtitle that it is not intended to secure her "a niche in Westminster Abbey" (i. e. among the graves of great writers) but for the better purpose "of putting pence in her pocket to maintain life."

It was claimed that The Actress's Ways and Means, to Industriously Raise the Wind (c. 1820) had gone into 12 editions. It states that Beverley herself suffered business failure, but gained success with what were known as her "Dramatic Metamorphoses", consisting mainly of verse recitals. Elsewhere she describes herself as a teacher of elocution to "the Pulpit, Bar, Stage, and Drawing Room", but also as "that Odd Little Woman". Some of her material is repeated in different pamphlets.

== On Brighton ==
Hail, favour'd spot, divine retreat!
Sweet refuge from Sol's scorching heat!
Here balmy zephyrs waft their wealth,
And impregnate each breeze with health:
Hither the sick and gay repair,
To breathe thy salubrious air:
Here harmless pleasure holds her sway,
Each face we meet as bright as day;
No gloom,——all joyous as the morn,
When first Sol's rays the sky adorn.
Well may our much-lov'd monarch here
Unbend a while from state and care;
Thrice happy spot! long may'st thou give
Sweet health to him, who gave the live,
Who, from the village rose thy state
To be a town superb and great.
Here, too, with joy do oft repair
The world's pride——England's matchless fair:
Their sylph-like forms each eye delight;
With beauty fair they sense unite;
No upstart pride in them we find,
(Sure index to an empty mind,)
But in each look true sweetness dwells,
And throws around its magic spells.
Blest place! at once in thee we view
All fancy's pencil ever drew.

== Selected works ==
The pamphlets were self-published. Many were reprinted. Data come from Orlando and the British Library catalogue.

- Modern Times, 1818
- A Poetical Olio, 1819
- The Monmouth Street Cap, being a close fit for many small heads as well as great ones, 1819
- The Actress's Ways and Means, to Industriously Raise the Wind, containing the moral and entertaining Poetical Effusions of Mrs. R. Beverley, comedian, professor of elocution... (c. 1820)
- Entertaining and Moral Poems on Various Subjects, expressly designed for the use of the rising generation ... (c. 1820)
- The Coronation (c. 1821)
- The Book of Variety; containing laughable anecdotes, entertaining poetry, etc., 1823
- The Indefatigable, bound on a Voyage to the Island of Liberality, 1825
- Odd Thoughts on a Variety of Odd Subjects, 1825
- Veluti in speculum, wherein the authoress ... has candidly stated her opinions on a variety of useful, and, she hopes, entertaining subjects, etc., 1827
- Useful Subjects in Prose and Verse, 1828 (4th e.)
- Ways and Means (possibly variant title of The Actress's Ways and Means...)
- The Bee
