= The Banksy Job =

2016 documentary film

The Banksy Job is a 2016 documentary film directed by Ian Roderick Gray and Dylan Harvey about how self-described "art terrorist" Andy Link (AK47) stole Banksy's 2004 sculpture The Drinker.

Funding for the film was crowdsourced in 2015 through Ivorlotte. The film premiered at the April 2016 Tribeca Film Festival. Andy Link attempted to attend the festival, but was denied a visa because of his criminal record.

== Reception ==
Alex Needham of The Guardian gave the film two out of five stars. He wrote that it "might entertain Banksy obsessives, and its elaborate re-creation of the incident and its aftermath surfs fact and fiction in a moderately interesting way. Yet it never convinces us that this story was worth telling." Needham also criticized the character AK47, writing that "he doesn't say anything amusing, or even interesting, in the course of the whole film."

John DeFore of The Hollywood Reporter gave the film a more positive review, saying that it would appeal to fans of Exit Through the Gift Shop. He praised the film's execution of the crime as "bumblingly funny" and the subsequent developments as "no less entertaining than a football in the groin." Alina Cohen of Hyperallergic praised the film for providing "some great British humor, a compelling main character, and some well-deserved cultural mockery."
