= Brydges Place =

Alley in the City of Westminster, London

Coordinates: 51°30′35.3″N 00°07′34.1″W

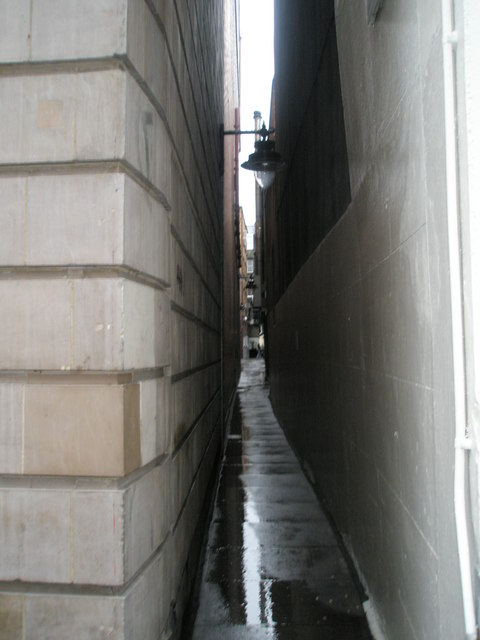

Brydges Place is an alley between St Martin's Lane and Bedfordbury in the City of Westminster, Greater London, running alongside the Coliseum. It is especially narrow, being just 1 foot 3 inches (0.38 m) wide at one point, and so is commonly claimed to be the narrowest street in London.

In 2019, the alley was used as a filming location for Last Christmas.
