= Seven Dials, London =

Neighbourhood in London's West End

Coordinates: 51°30′49.5″N 0°07′37.3″W

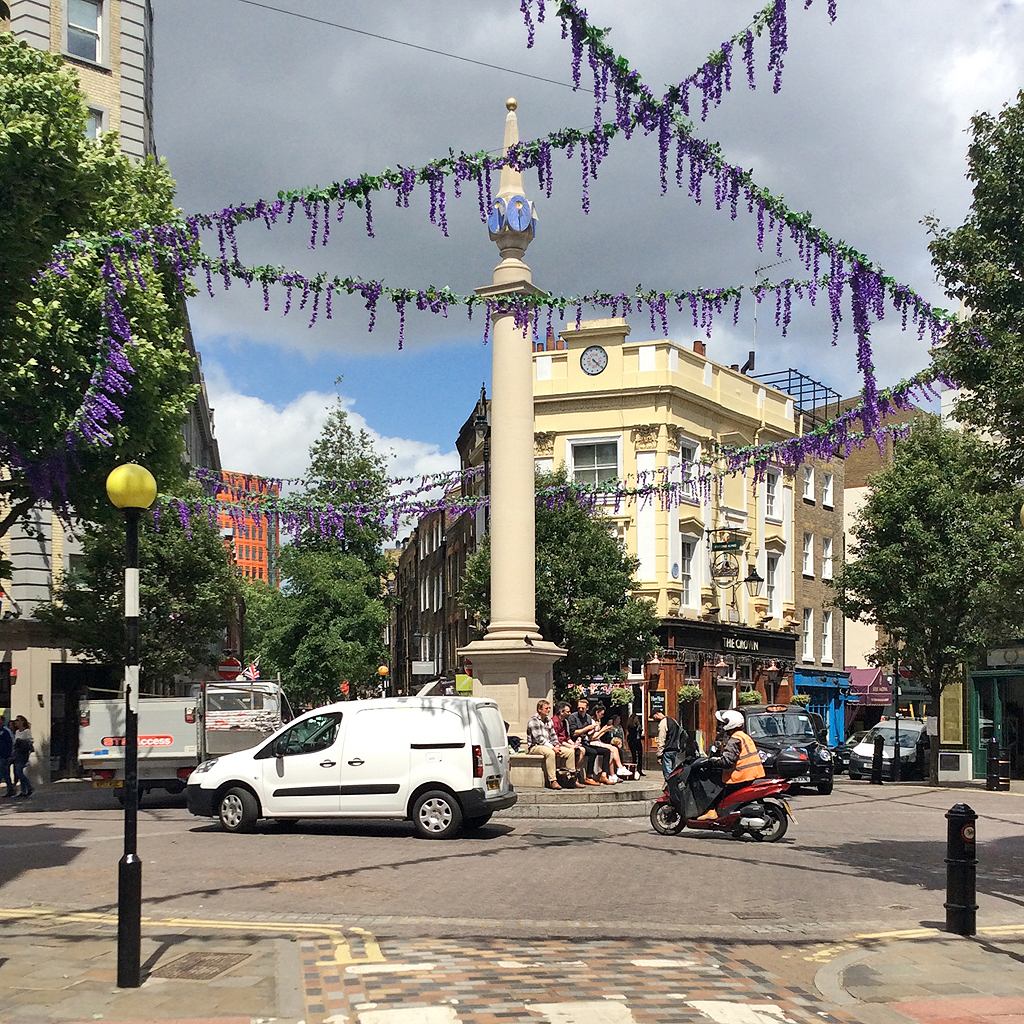
Seven Dials junction and sundial, as seen from Monmouth Street

Seven Dials is a road junction and neighbourhood in the St Giles district of the London Borough of Camden, within the greater Covent Garden area in the West End of London. Seven streets of the Seven Dials area converge at the roughly circular central roundabout, at the centre of which is a column bearing six sundials – with the column itself acting as the seventh sundial.

The Seven Dials Trust owns and maintains the column and the sundials and looks after the public realm in collaboration with the local authorities, major land-owners, Historic England and other stakeholders.

The Seven Dials area retains its original 17th-century street-plan, and many of the original Stuart houses remain, mostly re-faced in the late-18th and early-19th centuries.

A time plaque nearby helps visitors to deduce the time of the day fairly accurately (within ten seconds).

== History, to 1974 ==
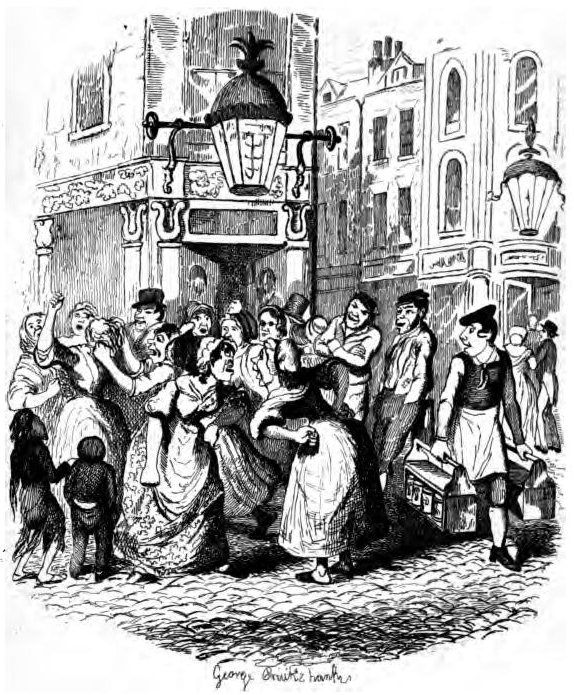
Seven Dials around 1836: illustration by George Cruikshank in Dickens' Sketches by Boz.

In the Middle Ages, the area was owned by the monastic hospital of St Giles which specialised in treating lepers, but it was expropriated by Henry VIII in 1537 and later passed into private hands. In the 17th century, a local estate known as Cock and Pye Fields belonged to the Worshipful Company of Mercers, which, to maximise its income in the burgeoning West End, allowed building licences on what until then was open farmland near the developing metropolitan area. The original layout of the Seven Dials area was designed by Thomas Neale during the early 1690s. His plan had six roads converging, although this number was later increased to seven. The sundial column was built with only six faces, with the column itself acting as the gnomon of the seventh dial. This layout was chosen to produce triangular plots, in order to minimise the frontage of houses to be built on the site, as rentals were charged per foot of frontage rather than by the square footage of properties.

After the successful development of the Covent Garden Piazza area nearby, Neale hoped that Seven Dials would be popular with wealthy residents. This was not to be, and the status of the area gradually went down. By the 19th century, Seven Dials was among the most notorious slums in London, as part of the slum of St Giles. The area was described by Charles Dickens in 1835:

... streets and courts [that] dart in all directions, until they are lost in the unwholesome vapour which hangs over the house-tops and renders the dirty perspective uncertain and confined.

In his collection Sketches by Boz, Dickens remarks,

The stranger who finds himself in the Dials for the first time...at the entrance of Seven obscure passages, uncertain which to take, will see enough around him to keep his curiosity awake for no inconsiderable time...

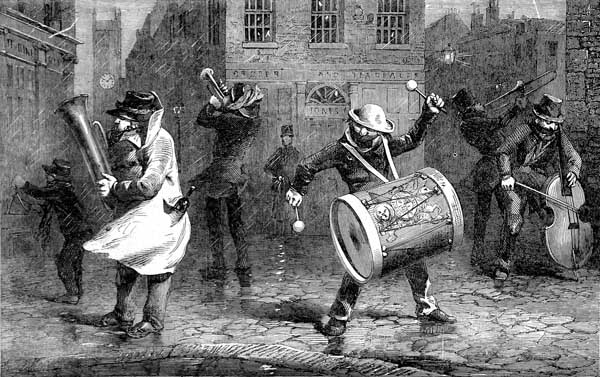
Henry George Hine (after), The Waits at Seven Dials (Christmas street musicians), December 1853, Illustrated London News

The poet John Keats described the area as the last resort for the poor and the ill.

... where misery clings to misery for a little warmth, and want and disease lie down side-by-side, and groan together.

The relatively low status of the location is also stated by W. S. Gilbert in the operetta Iolanthe:

Hearts just as pure and fair
May beat in Belgrave Square
As in the lowly air of Seven Dials.

It remained a byword for urban poverty during the early 20th century, when Agatha Christie set The Seven Dials Mystery (1929) there.

The original sundial column was removed in 1773. It was long believed that it had been pulled down by an angry mob, but recent research suggests it was deliberately removed by the Paving Commissioners in an attempt to rid the area of "undesirables". The remains were acquired by architect James Paine, who kept them at his house in Addlestone, Surrey, from where they were bought in 1820 by public subscription and re-erected in nearby Weybridge as a memorial to Princess Frederica Charlotte of Prussia, Duchess of York and Albany. It is now known as the York Column. The badly weathered dialstone was not reinstalled on the monument and can be seen adjacent to Weybridge Library.

During the 1840s Seven Dials was a major gathering area for the Chartists in their campaign for electoral reform. However, the illegal activities of some (plans for armed uprisings) were thwarted by the recently established police force.

By 1851 sewers were laid in the area, but poverty intensified in St Giles and in the Seven Dials, although the population began to decrease as workshops and breweries started occupying some of the houses. The model developed by Margaret Frere was established here to support poor children in education; it was adopted throughout London for school social work.

The seven streets at Seven Dials originally had quite different names from what they have now. They were Great Earl Street, Little Earl Street, Great White Lion Street, Little White Lion Street, Great St Andrew's Street, Little St Andrew's Street and Queen Street. In the 1930s, their names were changed: Great and Little Earl Streets became Earlham Street, Great and Little White Lion Streets became part of an extended Mercer Street, Great and Little St Andrew's Streets became Monmouth Street, and Queen Street became Shorts Gardens.

Today, only two houses remain from the original Thomas Neale development of the 1690s; 61 Monmouth Street and 64 Neal Street.

== History, after 1973 ==
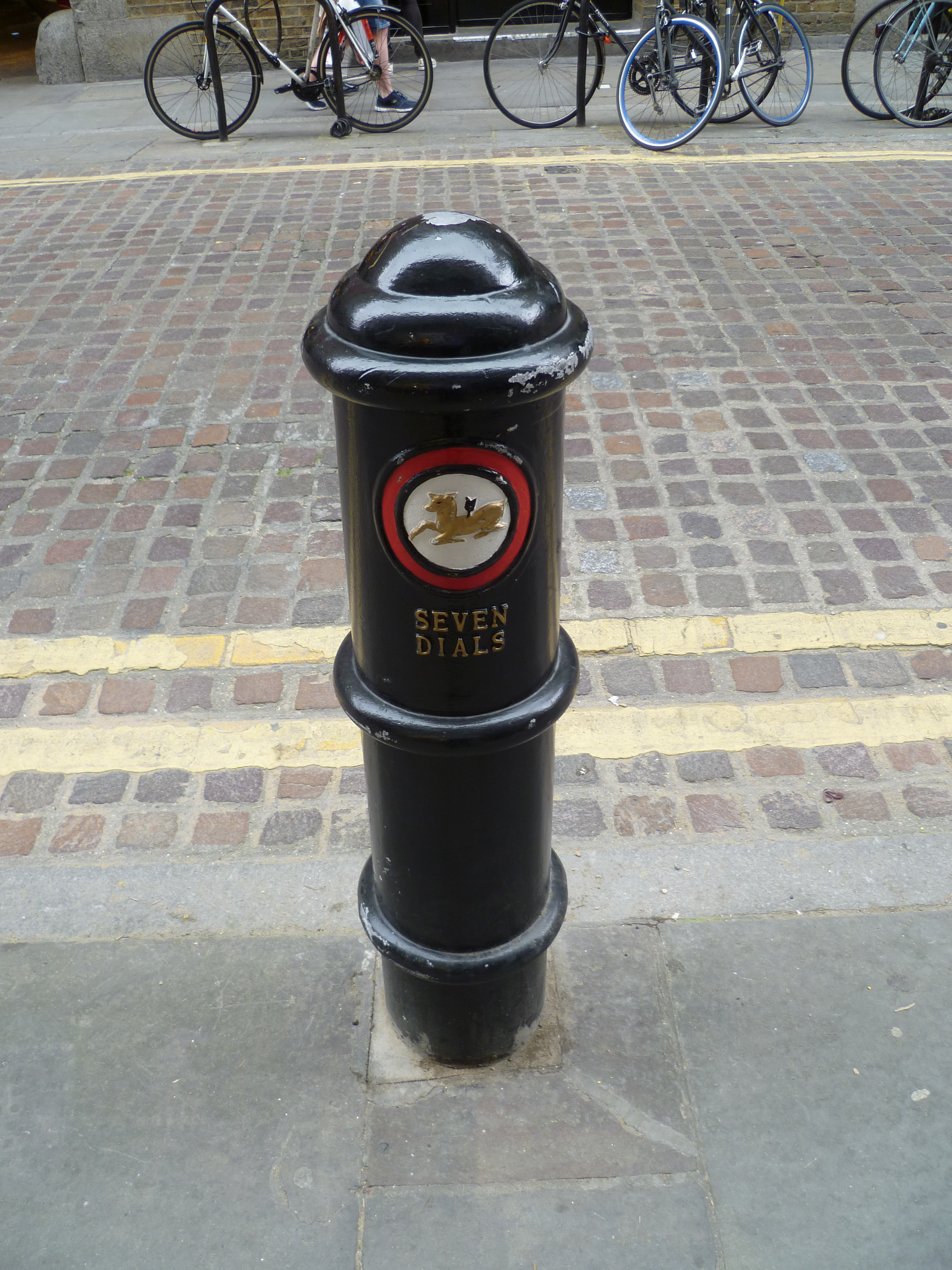
a Seven Dials bollard

According to Camden Council, the currently defined area "can be found to the north west of Covent Garden Market, and just to the south of Shaftesbury Avenue. The Dials comprise Earlham Street, Monmouth Street, Mercer Street and Shorts Gardens. The area now known as Seven Dials also includes Neal Street and Neals Yard." Monmouth Street is the only street in Seven Dials to have an official number; the B404. The others are unclassified.

During 1974, Seven Dials was named a Conservation Area with Outstanding Status and during 1977 it was declared a Housing Action Area. By 1984, the Housing Action Area Committee ensured that all of the vacant homes were in some use and was encouraging business to locate in the area. An increasing number of buildings have been restored over the years. Since 1974, over 25 percent of the area's buildings have been listed. Presently Seven Dials is a prosperous, largely commercial neighbourhood in the WC2 postcode area between the West End theatre district of Shaftesbury Avenue and the fashionable shopping district around nearby Neal's Yard. It is dominated by generally slow-moving traffic in the narrow streets, which are usually crowded with people.

The replacement sundial pillar, commissioned by The Seven Dials Trust, (formerly The Seven Dials Monument Charity), was constructed during 1988–89 to the original design. It was unveiled by Beatrix of the Netherlands during June 1989, on a visit to commemorate the tercentenary of the reign of William III and Mary II, during which the area was developed. The monument is owned by, and continues to be maintained by, The Seven Dials Trust whose mandate also includes improving the area, working with landowners as well as national and local agencies.

In 1994, Sir Alan Bates established the Tristan Bates Theatre, an Off West End fringe theatre venue with a 100-seat capacity located at the Actors Centre on Tower Street. Bates and his other son, Tristan's surviving twin brother Benedick, dedicated this to his memory following his sudden 1990 asthma attack death. It has since been refurbished and renamed the Seven Dials Playhouse.

By late 2017, investment company Shaftesbury plc owned an increasing number of the buildings, a "huge chunk" of the area, according to one news report. At that time, significant changes were occurring in the business properties including the conversion of a mall owned by Shaftesbury plc, Thomas Neal's Warehouse, into a single store that might become the main store for a major retailer and the conversion of a warehouse into office space.

On one of the seven apexes remains a pub, The Crown. On another apex is the Cambridge Theatre, and on a third the Radisson Edwardian Mercer Street Hotel. On another is the Comyn Ching Triangle, a block of old buildings renovated during the 1980s. Despite some redevelopment, many original buildings remain. There are two historic plaques in the area, one at 13 Monmouth Street, where Brian Epstein managed his company and another in Neal's Yard, at the "Animation, Editing and Recording Studios of Monty Python", actually the studios and offices of Michael Palin and Terry Gilliam from 1976 to 1987.

Seven Dials reports include the Seven Dials in Covent Garden Study, the Seven Dials Renaissance Study,

== The monument ==
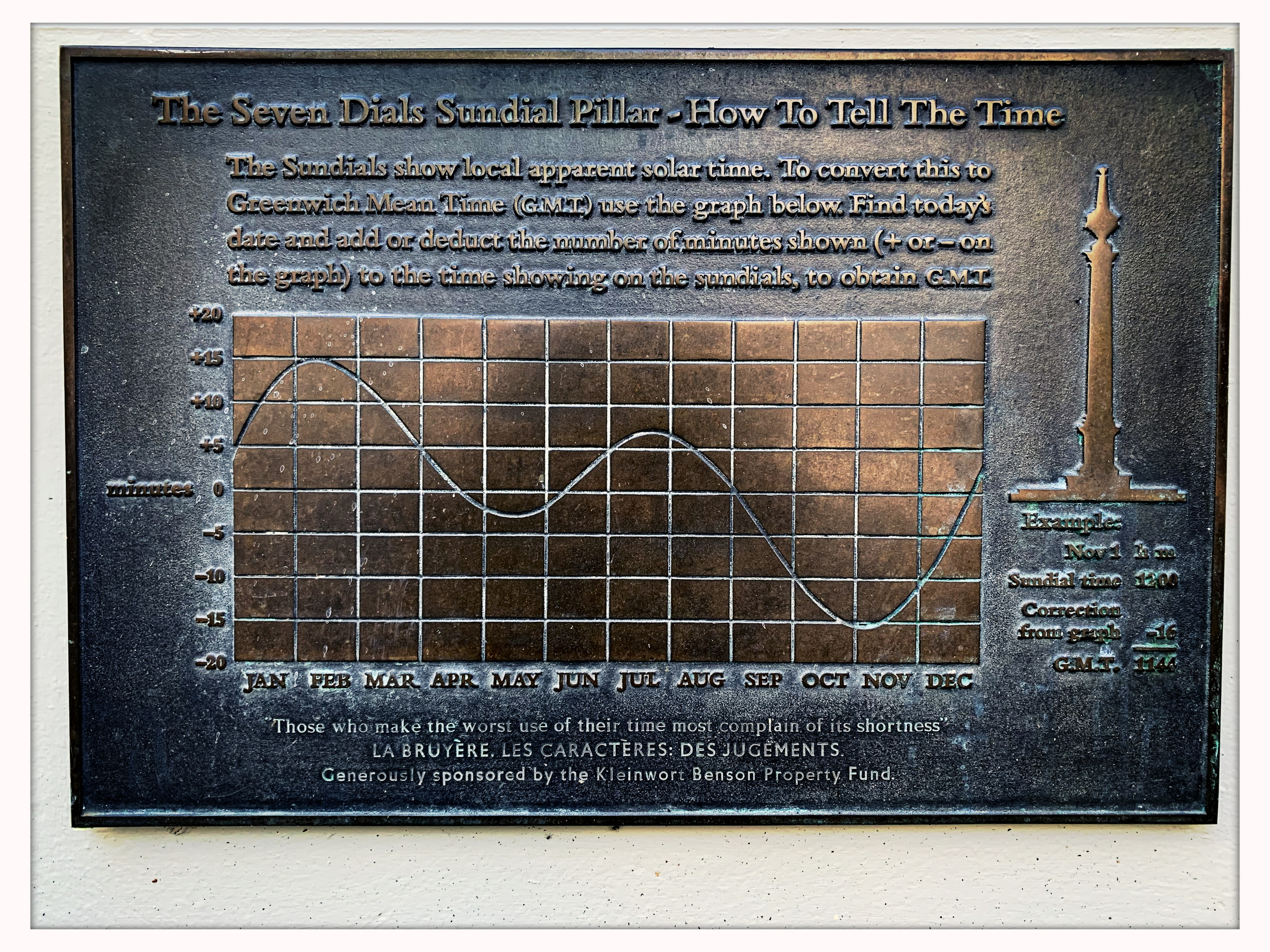
The Seven Dials Sundial Pillar – How To Tell The Time

Neale commissioned the architect and stonemason Edward Pierce to design and construct a sundial pillar during 1693–94. The original drawing in brown ink with a grey wash is in the British Museum collection.

On top of an eight-foot (2.4m) tall plinth, there is a 20-foot (6.1 m) tall Doric column. The sculpture that contains the six sundials and the pinnacle is ten feet (3.0 m) tall. This block is arranged with direct north and south facing vertical dials, and four vertically declining dials. The monument was erected during 1694, but removed during 1773. Reconstruction of the replica was launched by the Seven Dials Trust during 1985 and erected during 1989. It was the first project of its kind in London since the erection of Nelson's Column in the 1840s. The dials were designed, carved and gilded by Caroline Webb, while the astronomer Gordon Taylor verified the mathematics. Each of the faces is accurate to within ten seconds. The dials give local apparent solar time, so a correction must be made using the conversion graph displayed on the plinth to work out clock time. Seven dials is 0° 07' geographical degrees to the west of Greenwich – that is 3.048 seconds behind Greenwich Mean Time.

== In popular culture ==
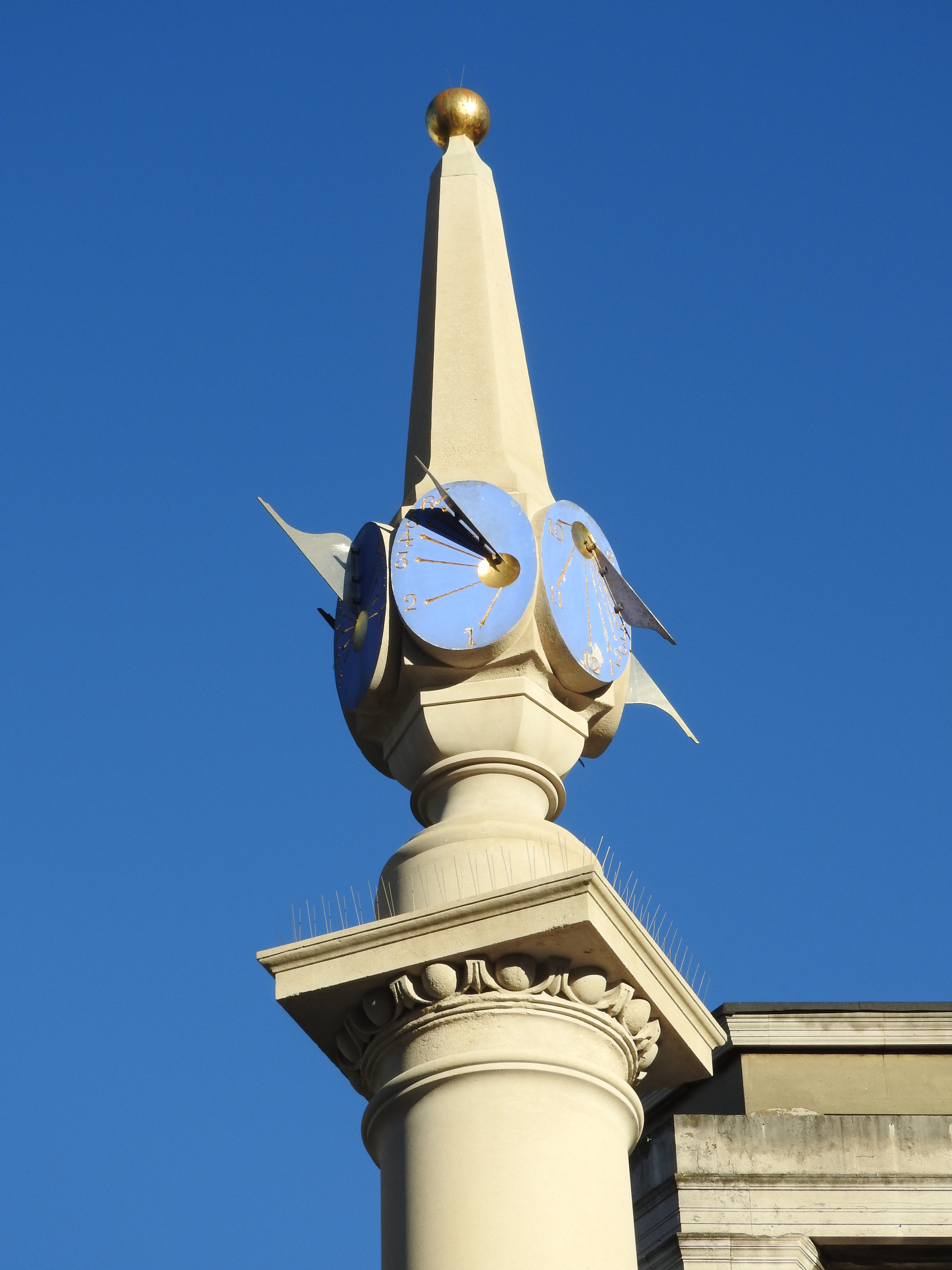
Facing north-west

- "The Monmouth Street Cap", an 1819 poem by Elizabeth Beverley, is a satirical account of public charity.
- One of the pieces in Charles Dickens' collection Sketches by Boz (1837–1839) is named "Seven Dials".
- In H. G. Wells' 1897 short story "The Crystal Egg", the eponymous object is owned by the proprietor of "a little and very grimy-looking shop near Seven Dials."
- In Pio Baroja’s 1908 novel "La ciudad de la niebla", near the house which is rented by the protagonist María Aracil "se hallaba la plaza de Seven Dials o de los Siete Cuadrantes, adonde convergían siete callejuelas, en otro tiempo rincón de mala fama, especie de corte de los Milagros londinense y hoy ya un sitio sin carácter alguno y con el aspecto de una plazuela concurrida y animada"
- In 1914, Robert Tressell's novel The Ragged-Trousered Philanthropists, the Liberal Party (UK) candidate's campaign in Mugsborough is enforced by bullies from Seven Dials paid ten shillings a day
- Agatha Christie's 1929 work, The Seven Dials Mystery refers to the area and features a club named for it. In 1981, London Weekend Television televised an adaptation of the book, with well-known actors, including John Gielgud.As well as a Netflix adaptation titled Agatha Christie's Seven Dials which was released on 15 January 2026.
- C. S. Forester's novel Mr. Midshipman Hornblower (1950) features a duchess, in the chapter "The Duchess and the Devil", who speaks in a "startlingly vulgar" accent from the Seven Dials.
- The name of the police station in the British television series The Gentle Touch (1980–1984) was Seven Dials.
- "I could be a rambler from the Seven Dials" is the opening lyric of Stephen Stills's 1991 song "Treetop Flyer".
- Brenda Hiatt's 1992 five-book Regency romance Saint of Seven Dials series features rogue heroes who rob from the rich to help the poor in the notorious Seven Dials slum of Regency era London.
- Slammerkin, a 2000 novel by Emma Donoghue, is partly set in Seven Dials.
- The 23rd book (2003) in Anne Perry's historical fiction series featuring Charlotte & Thomas Pitt, set in the late 1800s, is titled Seven Dials. A part of the book takes place in that slum area.
- Several episodes of the 2008 British television series City of Vice are set around Seven Dials.
- In Terry Pratchett's 2012 novel Dodger, Seven Dials is the setting for much of the action and where the eponymous hero lives.
- The Bone Season, a 2013 novel by Samantha Shannon, is partly set in Seven Dials.
- Roddy Frame's fourth solo studio album, released in 2014, is entitled Seven Dials. Frame explained in a radio interview that he has spent much time there.
- The 2015, final book in the Williamson Papers series, Back Home by Tom Williams, is also set in 19th-century London; a character has gotten into trouble in the Seven Dials.
- The May 2021, Punjabi singer and rapper Sidhu Moose Wala shot a music video in Seven Dials.
- The 1958 movie "Corridors of Blood" or "Doctor From Seven Dials", set in the 1840s. Dr. Thomas Bolton (Boris Karloff) has a charity clinic in the Seven Dials.

== Property development ==
Seven Dials is predominantly owned by Shaftesbury PLC, which previously had a joint venture with the Worshipful Company of Mercers at the adjoining St Martin's Courtyard.
