= Tower Street, Covent Garden =

Street in Covent Garden, London

Coordinates: 51°30′47.67″N 0°7′39.91″W

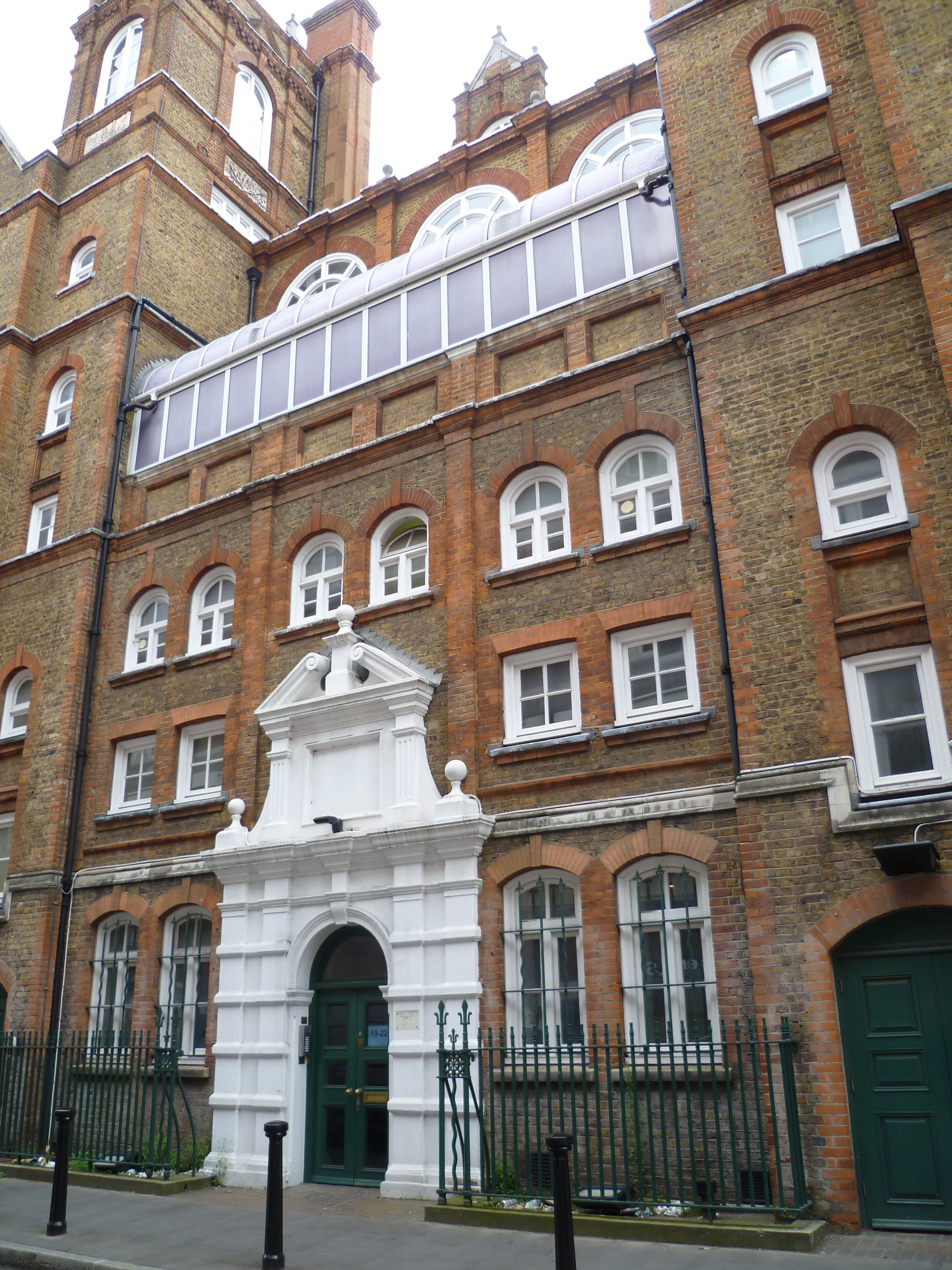
22 Tower Street

Tower Street is a street in Covent Garden, in the London Borough of Camden. It runs from Earlham Street in the north to Monmouth Street in the south and is crossed only by the pedestrianised Tower Court.

== Buildings ==
22 Tower Street is a grade II listed school, later the headquarters of Andrew Lloyd Webber's Really Useful Group but recently converted to corporate meeting and events spaces known as "The Form Rooms".
