= Monmouth Street =

Street in London

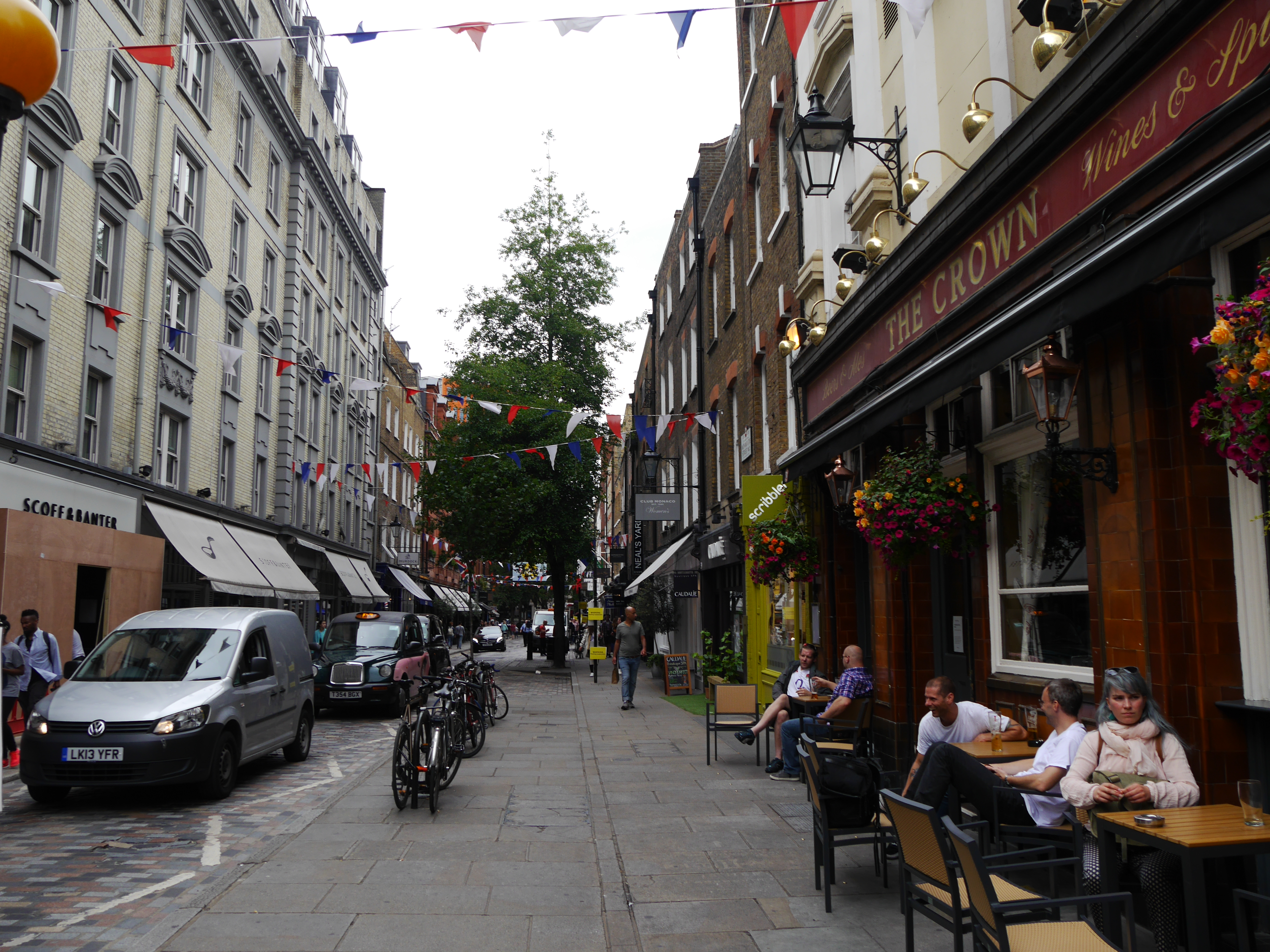
- Interactive map of Monmouth Street
- Former name(s): Great St Andrew's Street, Little St Andrew's Street
- Part of: Seven Dials
- Namesake: Earl of Monmouth
- Type: Shopping street
- Location: Covent Garden, London
- Postal code: WC2
- Coordinates: 51.5144°N 0.1269°W
- From: Shaftesbury Avenue
- Major junctions: Seven Dials (Mercer St, Earlham St, Shorts Gardens)
- To: Tower St / Shelton St

Monmouth Street is a street in the Seven Dials district of Covent Garden, London, England.

Monmouth Street runs north to south from Shaftesbury Avenue to a crossroads with Tower Street and Shelton Street, where it becomes St Martin's Lane. About halfway it meets Seven Dials, where it intersects with Mercer Street, Earlham Street, and Shorts Gardens. It is numbered B404.

== Former street ==
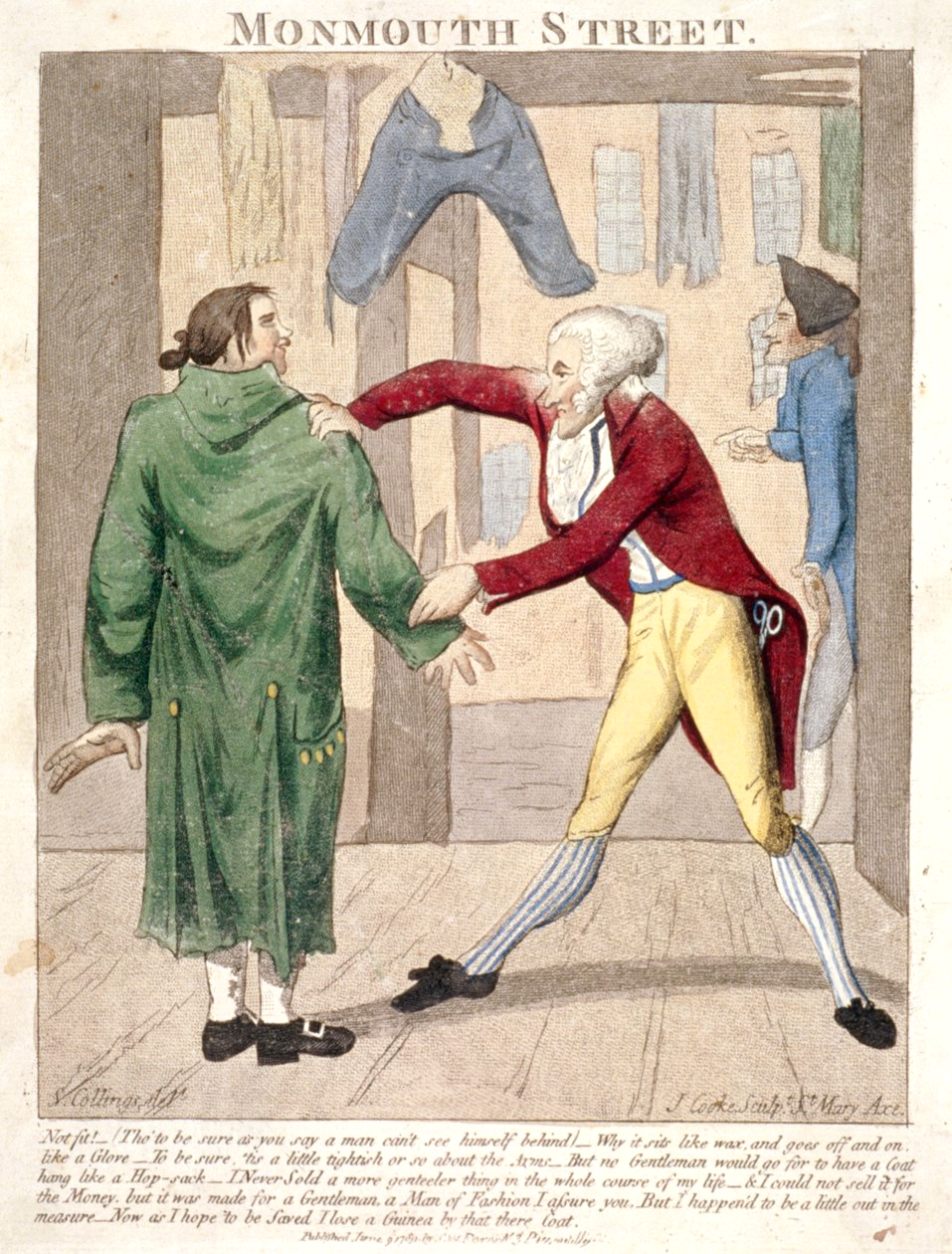
Monmouth Street. Not Fit!, 1789 satirical print of the old clothes trade

The original street, which was named after the Earls of Monmouth who owned land here in the 17th century, ran from what is now Charing Cross Road to another former street called Broad Street (now part of St Giles High Street). Throughout the 18th century and for most of the 19th, Monmouth Street was famous for its old clothes shops. John Gay wrote in his 1716 poem Trivia, or The Art of Walking the Streets of London: "Thames Street gives cheeses, Covent Garden fruits, Moorfields old books, and Monmouth Street old suits." Notable inhabitants in 1751–55 included the freemasons John Hamilton and John Holland.

In the 19th century, Monmouth Street was widened to form the eastern part of Shaftesbury Avenue, and the name disappeared.

== Current street ==
The current street was originally two separate streets. The part north of Seven Dials was called 'Great St Andrew's Street' and the part south of Seven Dials 'Little St Andrew's Street'. In the 1930s the whole street was renamed Monmouth Street, in an attempt to re-create the original street. The Covent Garden Hotel is situated at no. 10 and the original home of Monmouth Coffee Company at no. 27. Pollock's Toy Museum started in 1956 in a single attic room at no. 44 above Benjamin Pollock's Toy Shop, but outgrew the premises and moved in 1969 to Scala Street.
