= Shorts Gardens =

Street in Central London

Coordinates: 51°30′53″N 0°07′31″W

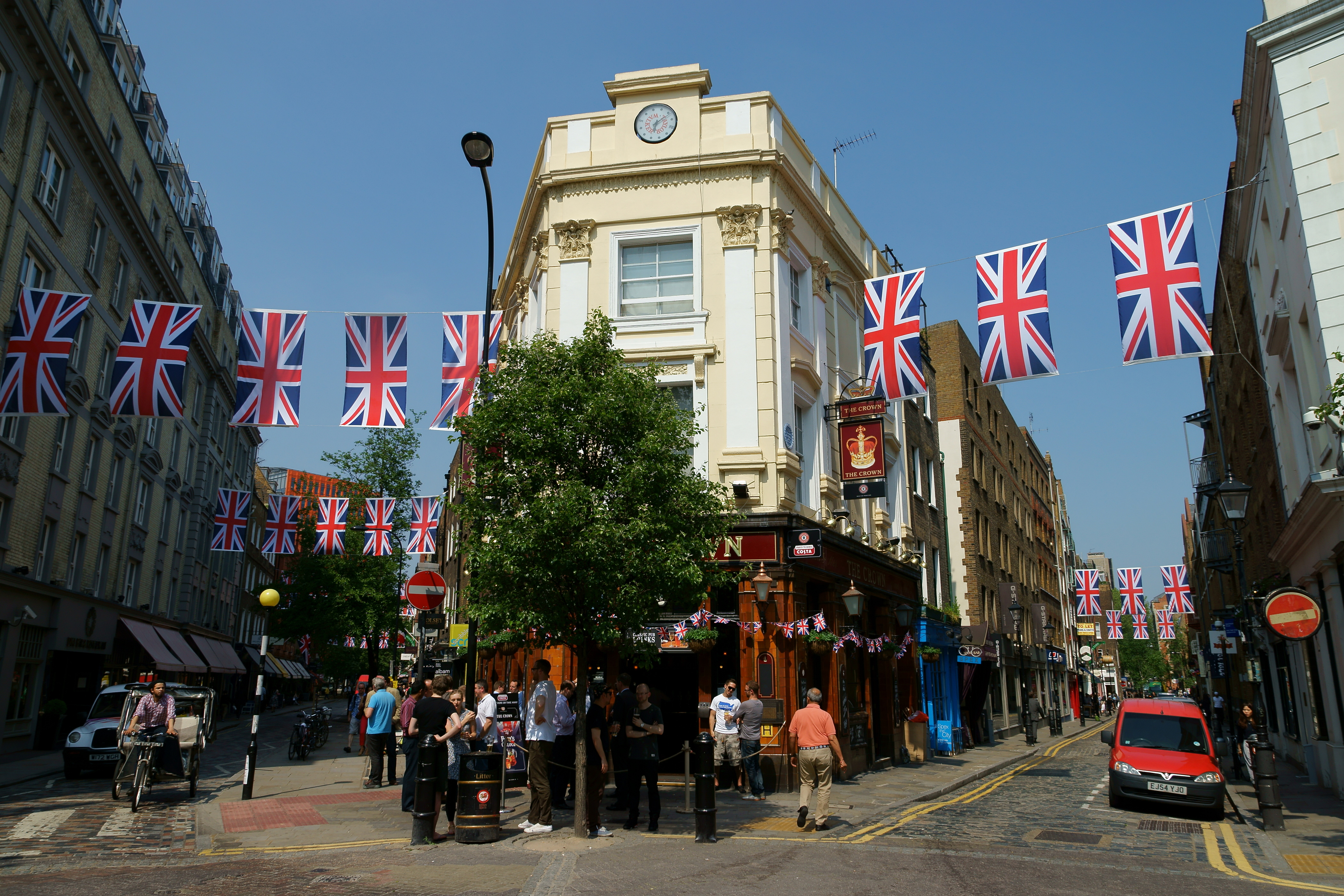
The Crown pub where Shorts Gardens meets Seven Dials.

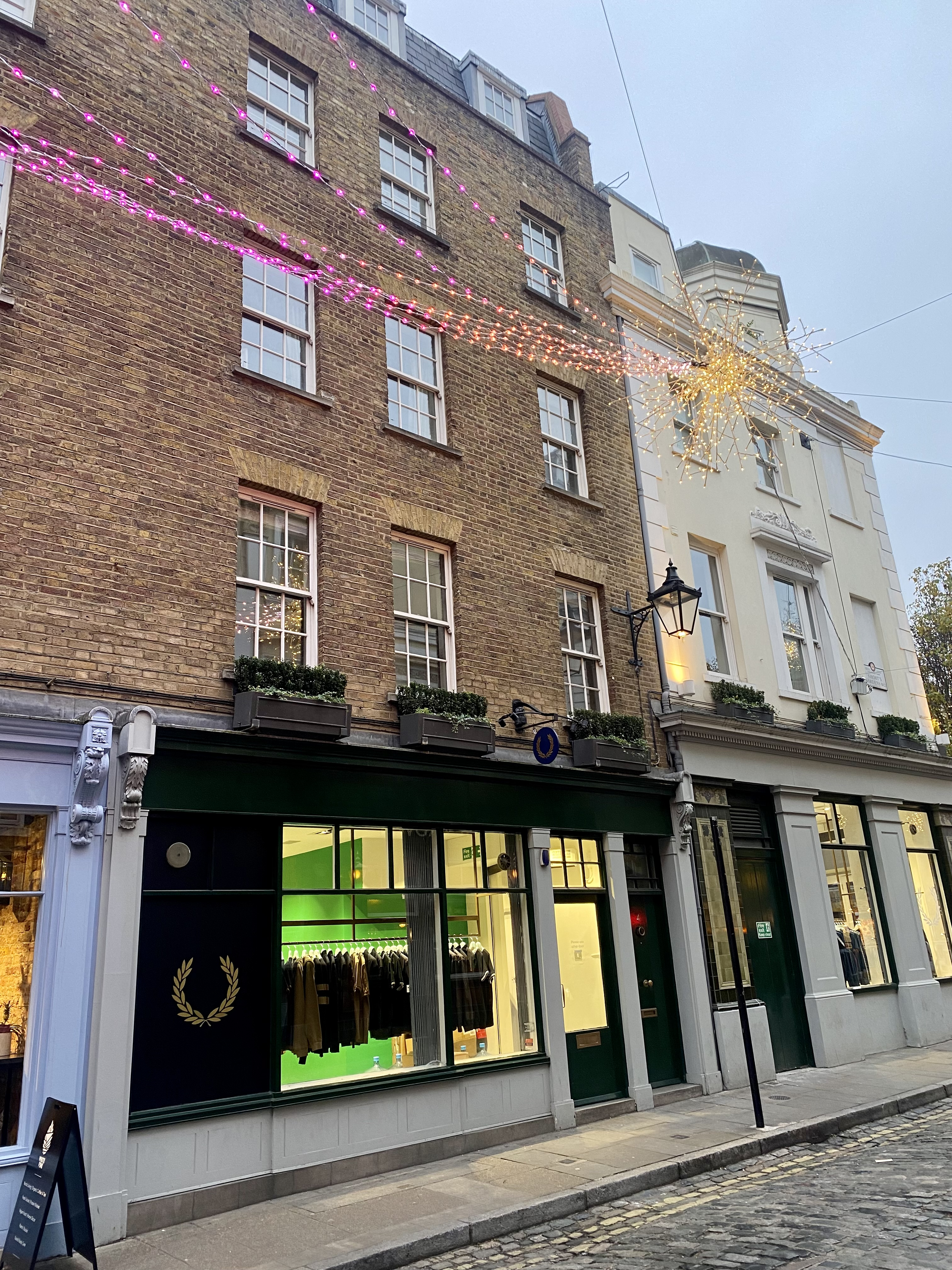
Number 4, Shorts Gardens.

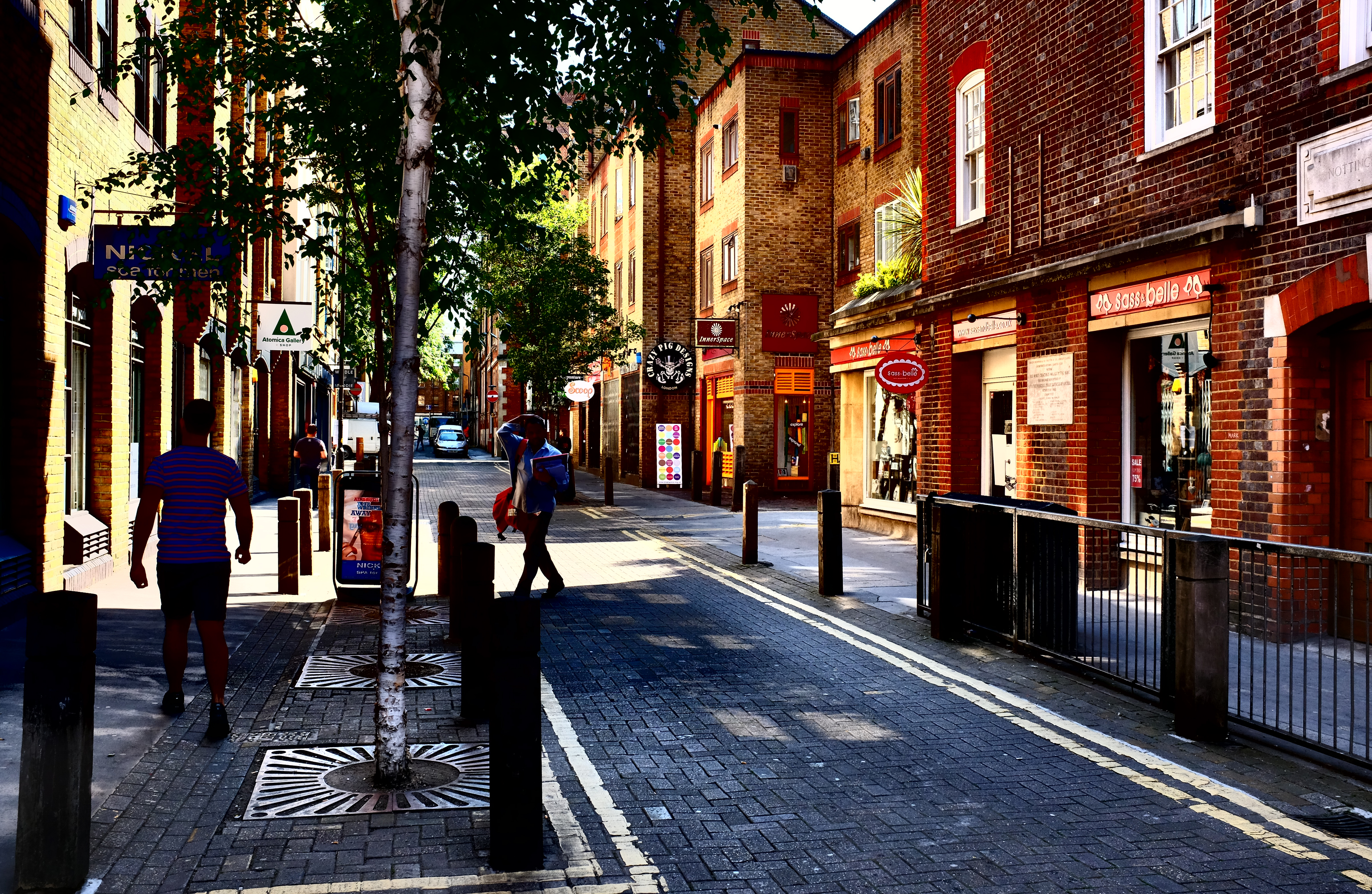

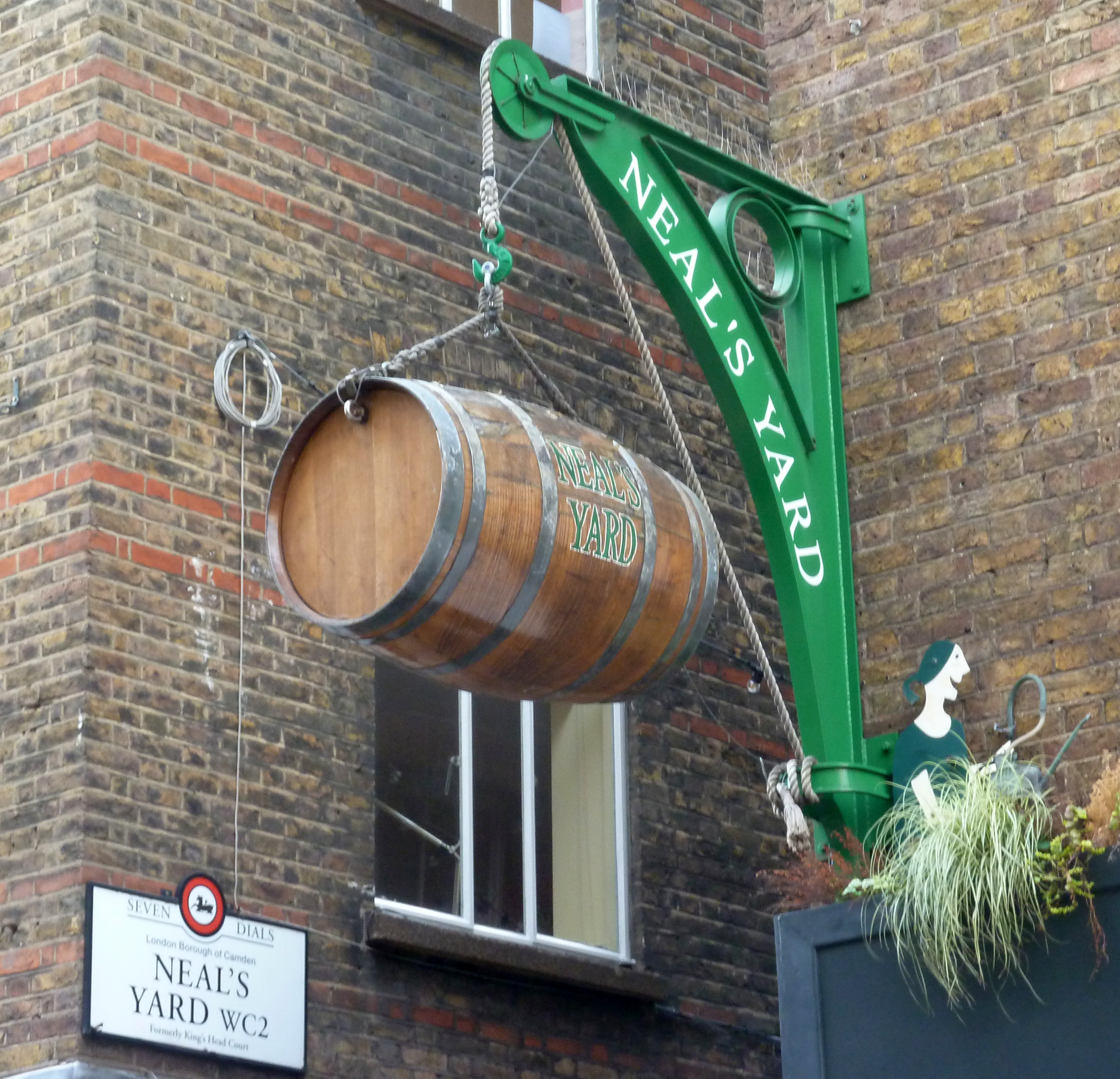
The entrance to Neal's Yard from Shorts Gardens.

Shorts Gardens is a street in the St Giles area of Central London. It runs eastwards from Seven Dials to Drury Lane, crossing Neal Street and Endell Street. The Covent Garden district is located just to the south.

The western stretch, one of the prongs that runs off Seven Dials, was known as Queen Street until 1903. The eastern stretch was named Shorts Gardens after William Short, the gardener of Gray's Inn who purchased the land in 1590 when it was still open countryside outside London and was owned by his descendants until 1690 when it was sold off for development. The western end featured houses built in the late 17th century and intended for the rich, but during the following century this became a slum as part of the rookery of St Giles. The eastern stretch had poorer inhabitants from the beginning and at one point became a centre for Italian organ grinders. This gave way over time to warehouses servicing the fruit trade in nearby Covent Garden market. When built, it was residential; it is now largely commercial. Neal's Yard runs off the street as does Nottingham Court. At Seven Dials on the corner between Shorts Gardens and Monmouth Street is The Crown pub, dating back as tavern to at least 1700.
