= Shaftesbury Avenue =

Major street in the West End of London

Coordinates: 51.512°N 0.132°W

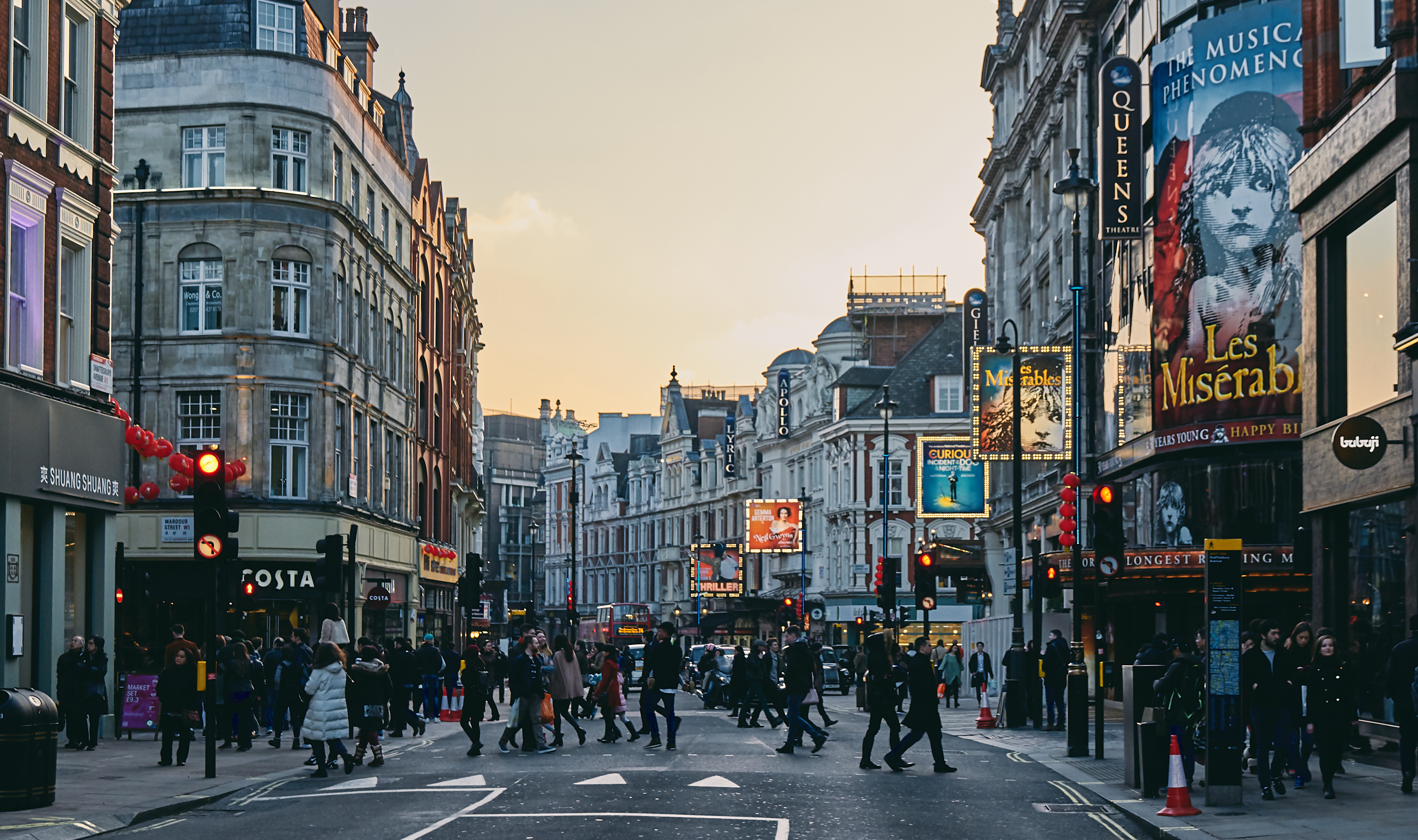
Shaftesbury Avenue in 2016, with West End theatres visible along the right side of the road

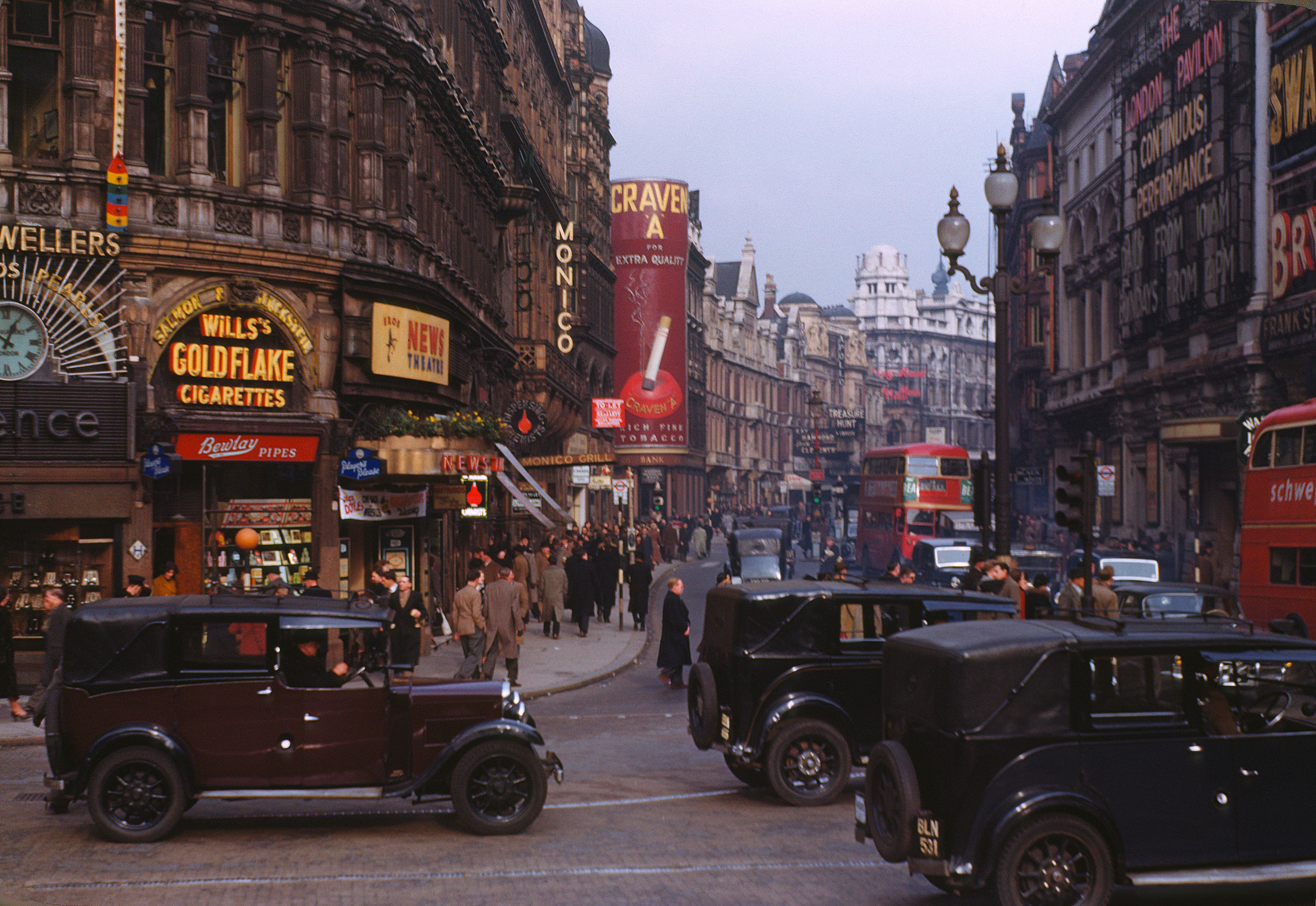
Shaftesbury Avenue from Piccadilly Circus in 1949

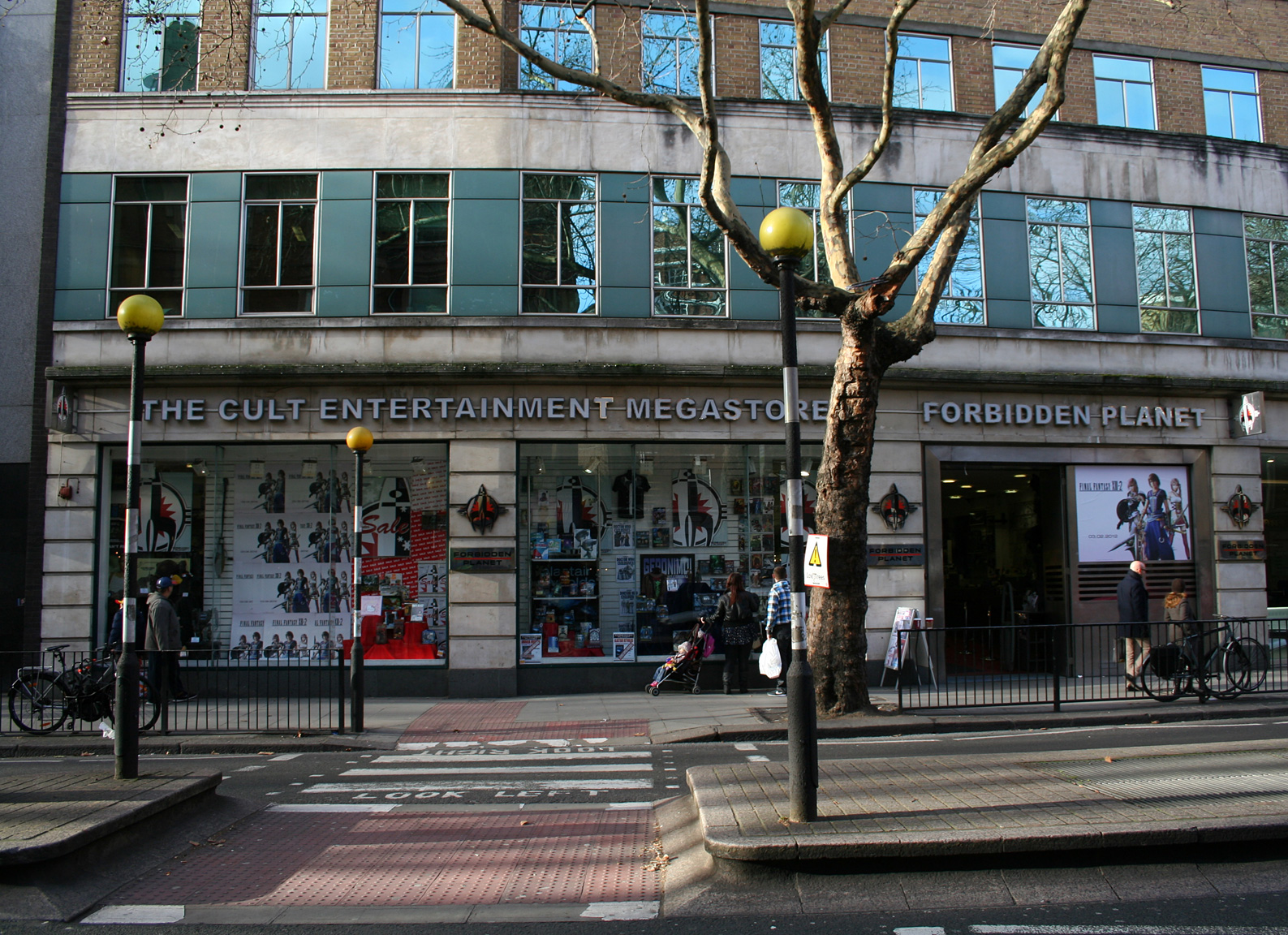
The Forbidden Planet comic store on the road

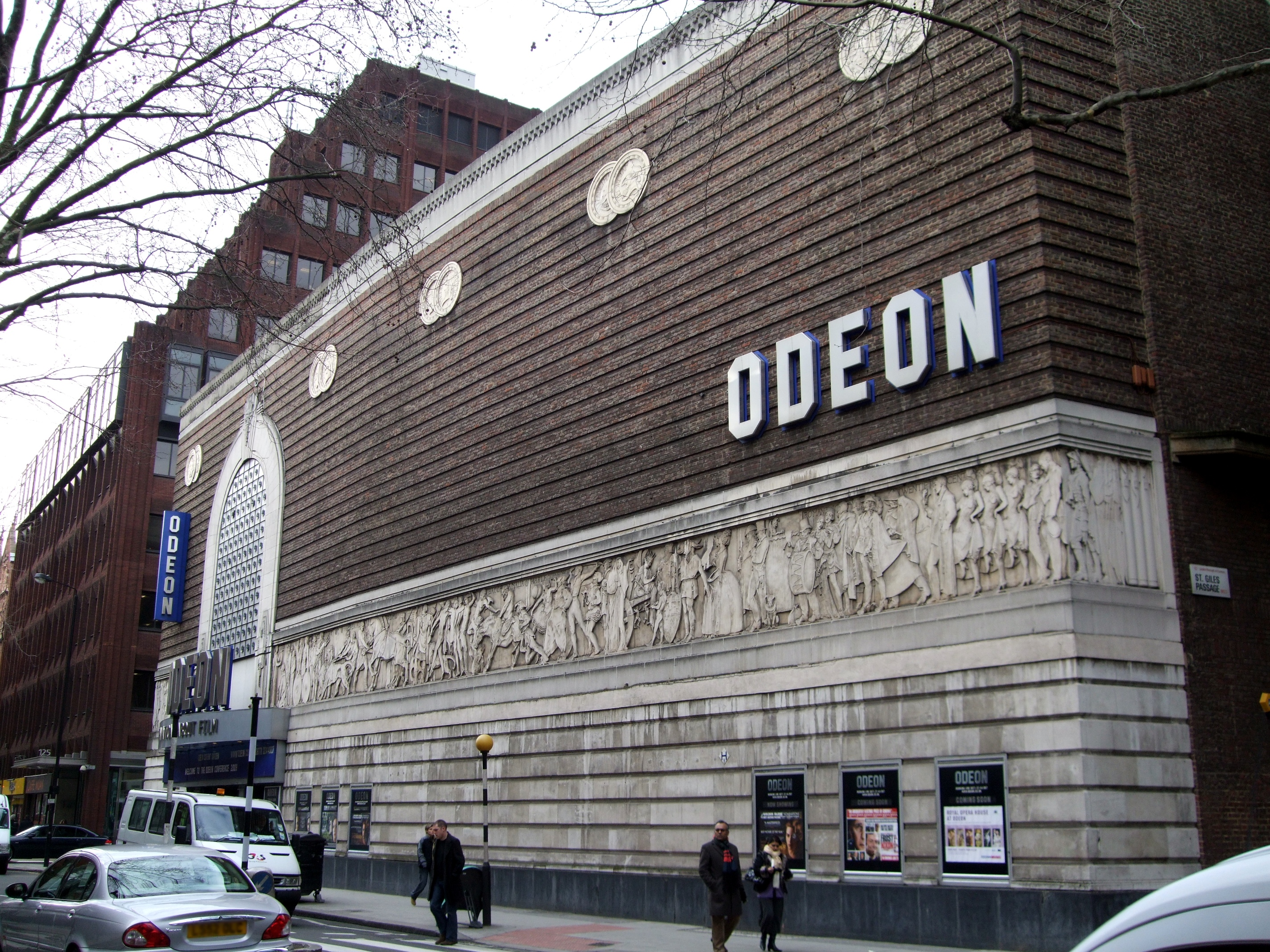
Odeon Cinema at 135 Shaftesbury Avenue

Shaftesbury Avenue is a major road in the West End of London, named after The 7th Earl of Shaftesbury. It runs north-easterly from Piccadilly Circus to New Oxford Street, crossing Charing Cross Road at Cambridge Circus. From Piccadilly Circus to Cambridge Circus, it is in the City of Westminster, and from Cambridge Circus to New Oxford Street, it is in the London Borough of Camden.

Shaftesbury Avenue was built between 1877 and 1886 by the architect George Vulliamy and the engineer Sir Joseph Bazalgette, to provide a north–south traffic artery through the crowded districts of St. Giles and Soho.

The avenue is generally considered the heart of London's West End theatre district, with the Lyric, Apollo, Gielgud and Sondheim theatres clustered together on the west side of the road between Piccadilly Circus and Charing Cross Road. At the intersection of Shaftesbury Avenue and Charing Cross Road is the large Palace Theatre. Finally, the north-eastern end of the road has another large theatre, the Shaftesbury Theatre.

Also on Shaftesbury Avenue is the former Saville Theatre, which became a cinema in 1970. It was first known as ABC1 and ABC2 but, since 2001, it has been the Odeon Covent Garden. Another cinema, the Soho Curzon, is located about halfway along the street.

Between 1899 and 1902, no. 67 Shaftesbury Avenue was the location of the Bartitsu School of Arms and Physical Culture, which is the first commercial Asian martial arts training school in the Western world.

Shaftesbury Avenue marks the boundary of three discrete West End areas. The subsection of the road from Piccadilly Circus to Cambridge Circus marks the southern border of Soho. Of that subsection a slightly shorter stretch thereof, from Great Windmill Street to Cambridge Circus, denotes the southern edge of the Soho gay village. Overlapping the gay village boundary, the still-shorter part of the street from Wardour Street to Greek Street marks the interface between gay Soho and London's Chinatown.

The number of Chinese businesses on the street has been on the increase. On the ground level in August 2007, there were two traditional Chinese medicine practices, five Chinese restaurants, three Chinese supermarkets, three Chinese travel agents, two Chinese mobile phone outlets, a Chinese cake shop, two Chinese hair salons, a Chinese fishmonger, a Chinese newsagent, a Chinese bureau de change, and three Chinese banks.

In the evening, street artists gather on the pavement outside the headquarters of International Currency Exchange and Raphaels Bank (previously the home of NatWest) at the Piccadilly Circus end of Shaftesbury Avenue, and produce portraits for the tourists.

== See also ==
- List of London theatres
- Chinatown, London
- List of eponymous roads in London
