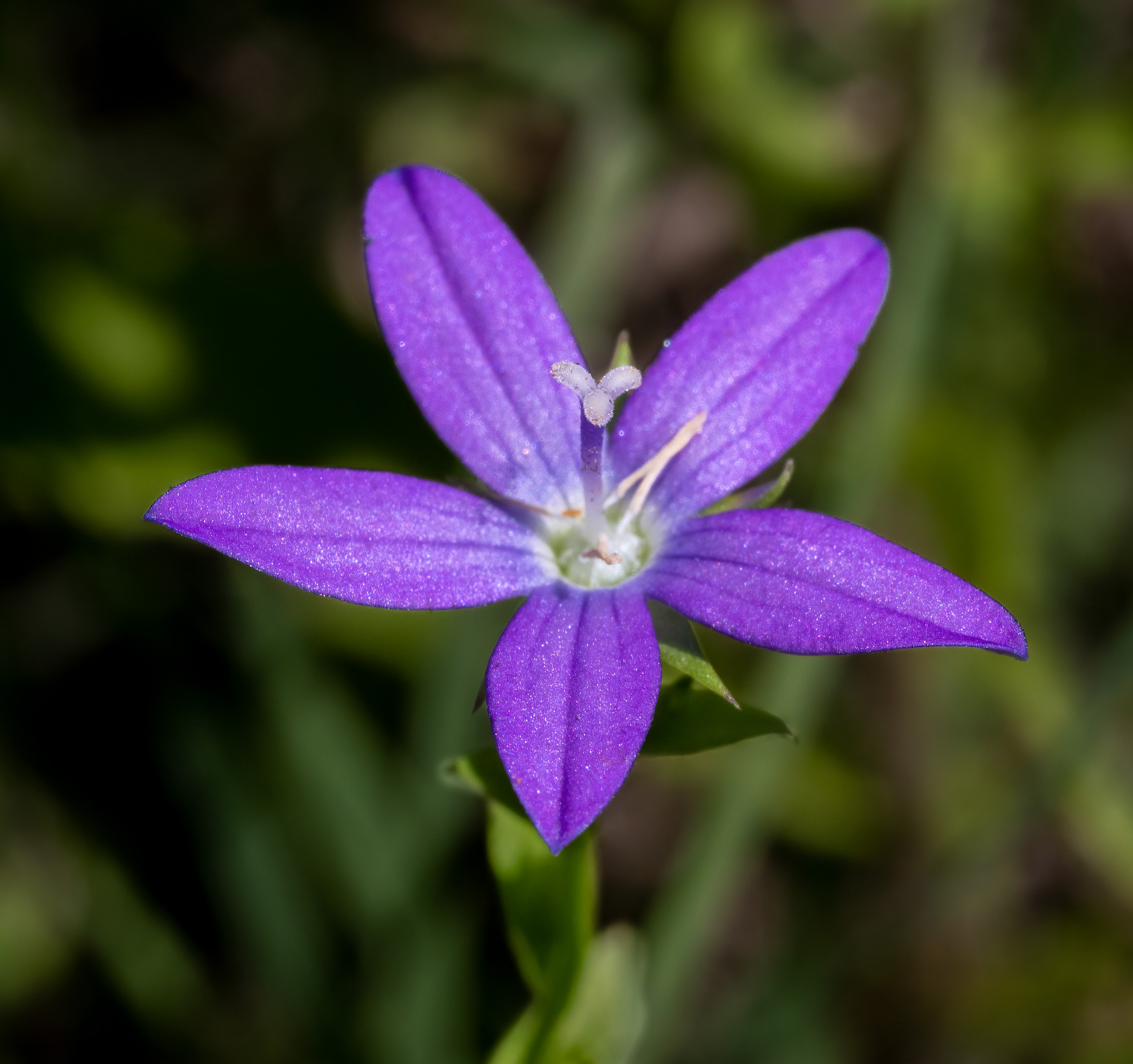

Scientific classification
- Kingdom: Plantae
- Clade: Tracheophytes
- Clade: Angiosperms
- Clade: Eudicots
- Clade: Asterids
- Order: Asterales
- Family: Campanulaceae
- Genus: Triodanis
- Species: T. biflora

Binomial name
- Triodanis biflora (Ruiz & Pav.) Greene
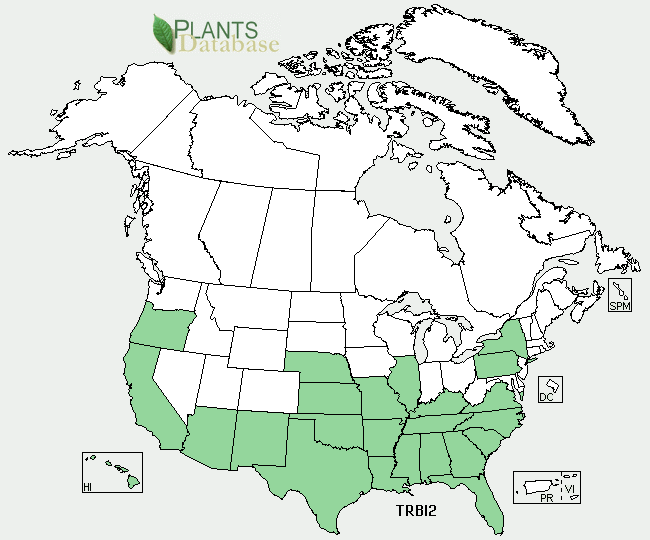
- Distribution of Triodanis biflora

Synonyms
- Specularia biflora

= Triodanis biflora =

Species of flowering plant

Triodanis biflora, also known as the Small Venus' Looking-Glass, is a species of flowering plant in the Campanulaceae family, or bellflower family, and is in the genus Triodanis. Its common name was given because it is similar to the European plant, Legousia speculum that has seeds with a shiny appearance resembling looking glass. This species is native to America and is a small, solitary wildflower with purple bell-shaped petals and an alternate leaf arrangement. It can be found in a diverse range of habitats, especially in disturbed areas across the U.S. and into South America, and it has an annual life cycle where it flowers from May to June. This species primarily relies on selfing due to its floral system; however, pollination by various insects can occur. While sharing many similarities with its relative, Triodanis perfoliata from their history of hybridization, key features that separate the two flowers are their anatomy and breeding system.

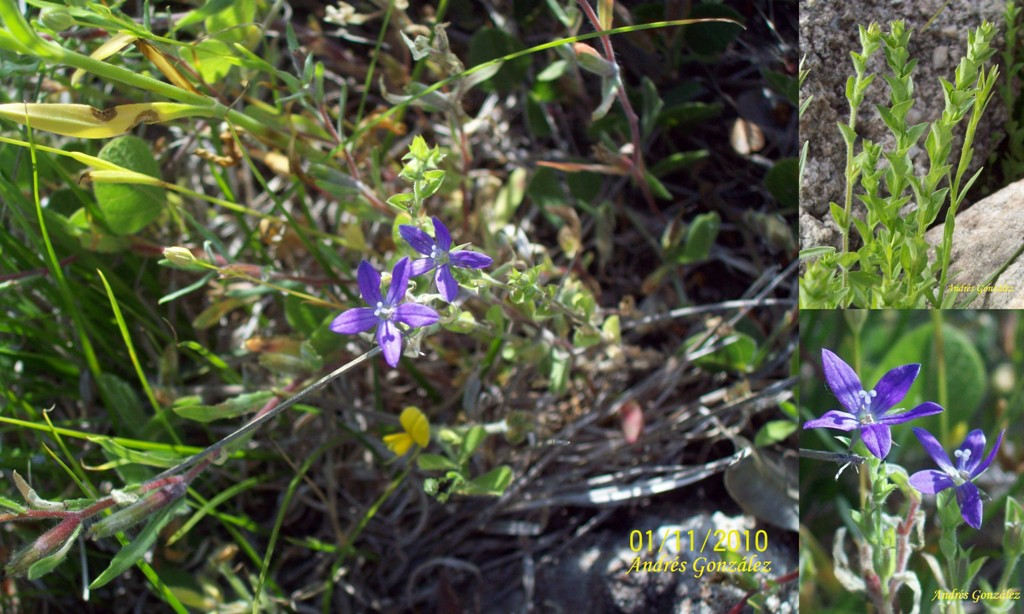
Triodanis biflora in a natural habitat, visual of the stem and leaf arrangement, and chasmogamous flower example at the tip of the stem

== Habitat ==
Triodanis biflora can occupy a broad subset of environments; however, it is mainly found in southern regions. Within the United States, its most common habitats include Eastern Virginia, Kentucky, Kansas, Arkansas, Oregon, and the south central peninsula of Florida. While these are common locations to find this species, it can be found in many other states in the U.S and at higher elevations. This flower can also be found in some parts of Mexico and South America due to their preference for southern geographies and warmer climates.

As a wildflower, Triodanis biflora can survive in disturbed lands, or areas that have been extensively manipulated by humans, and can exist in a wide variety of other environmental niches. Examples of some of the niches it will occupy include prairies, roadsides, gravel pits, open woods, grassy slopes, and it can even be found growing through the cracks in sidewalks. Although Triodanis biflora can inhabit disturbed lands, it is not limited to these environments, and can be found in forests, brush, riparian zones, grasslands, and sand. Consistent with its generalist habitats, this species can survive in multiple soil conditions, but it tends to be found in poor, dry, and sandy soil. These broad ranges and ability to survive in less favorable soil conditions allow it to escape possible competition with other plants.

== Anatomy ==
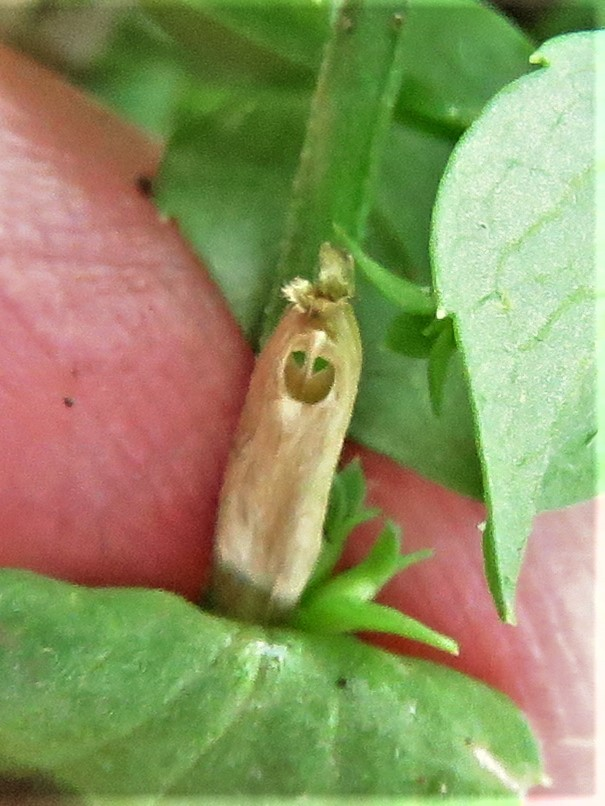
Close up of dehiscence pore on fruit capsule (located near the apex)

Triodanis biflora is generally a small flower, only reaching heights between 12-30 inches. It is very closely related to other flowers in the Triodanis family, especially Triodanis perfoliata. However, this species differs from Triodanis perfoliata because the pore that releases its seeds from the fruit is located much higher, on the apex, of the capsule compared to the pore being in the middle of the capsule on Triodanis perfoliata. This oval to round shaped pore is referred to as the dehiscence pore and it is a defining characteristic of the species due to its alternative placement. The capsule of Triodanis biflora is an elliptic shaped fruit that encases reddish-brown, smooth seeds that are also an ellipsoidal to orbicular shape. Each fruit will have a similar shape and size once the inferior positioned ovary has matured.

Inflorescence

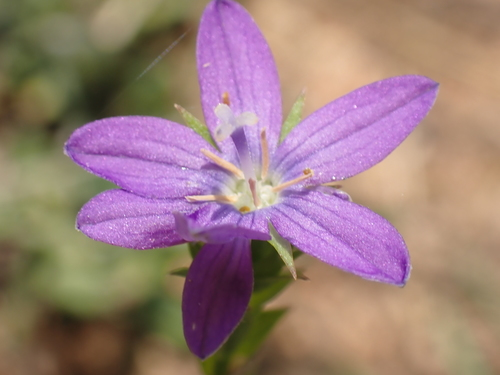
Close up example of a solitary, cosexual chasmogamous flower

There are typically 1-3 flowers per node; however, Triodanis biflora is known for having a solitary flower at the tip of the stem. This species displays a cleistogamous floral system where the cleistogamous flowers are typical of the lower flowers and rely on self-pollination. Some individuals of T. biflora can also have chasmogamous flowers; however, this is only seen in one or two inflorescences and is more common for the upper, solitary flower. Cleistogamous flowers are typically created first, as suggested by their lower placement on the stem, then chasmogamous flowers will then be produced, and sometimes cleistogamous flowers will be created again afterwards. Similar to its dehiscence pore, the low number of chasmogamous flowers are a defining characteristic that separates Triodanis biflora from other species in its family. However, variation does exist across this species, and some South American populations in Paraguay, Brazil, and Argentina have been reported to have more than two chasmogamous flowers.

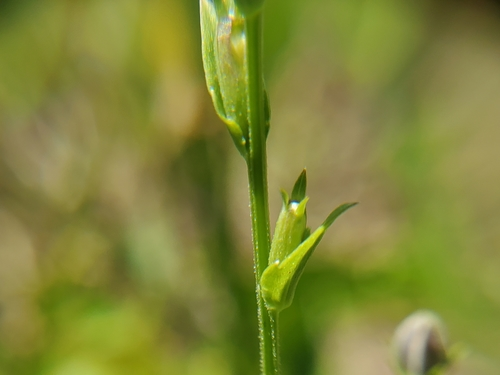
Example of cleistogamous flower on Triodanis biflora

Each flower has 5 petals, giving it radial symmetry, that can be a blue-violet, pink-purple, or lavender color. The upper, open flowers are more showy and each petal is an elliptical shape, fused together with the other petals at the base, and connected to a short tube. Within each individual flower are 5 stamens that have translucent filaments, yellow anthers, 3 stigmas, and a many-ovuled ovary with axile placentation. Pollen is presented to pollinators on a stylar brush, which is a term used to described pollen collecting hairs on the style, after the anthers release their pollen and before the stigma is receptive. The styles are 5 mm long and have a 3-lobed tip. These can be basal or apical, where the basal styles are generally white while the apical styles are purple and can be covered in a few small hairs. The sepals form a cup around the flower and have narrow triangular lobes that make a sharp tip at the end.

Leaves

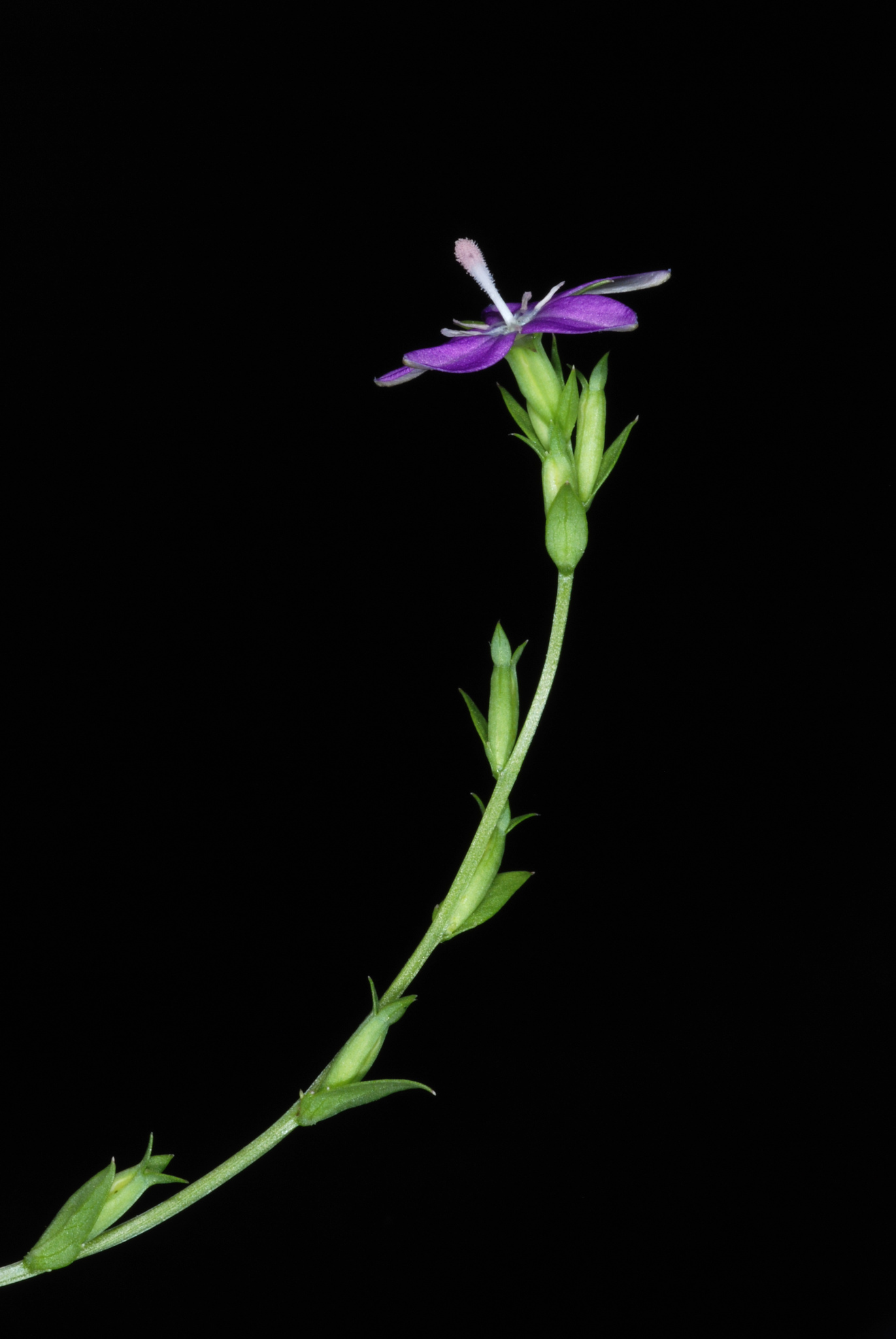
Full length stem with cleistogamous flowers and solitary chasmogamous at the tip of the stem

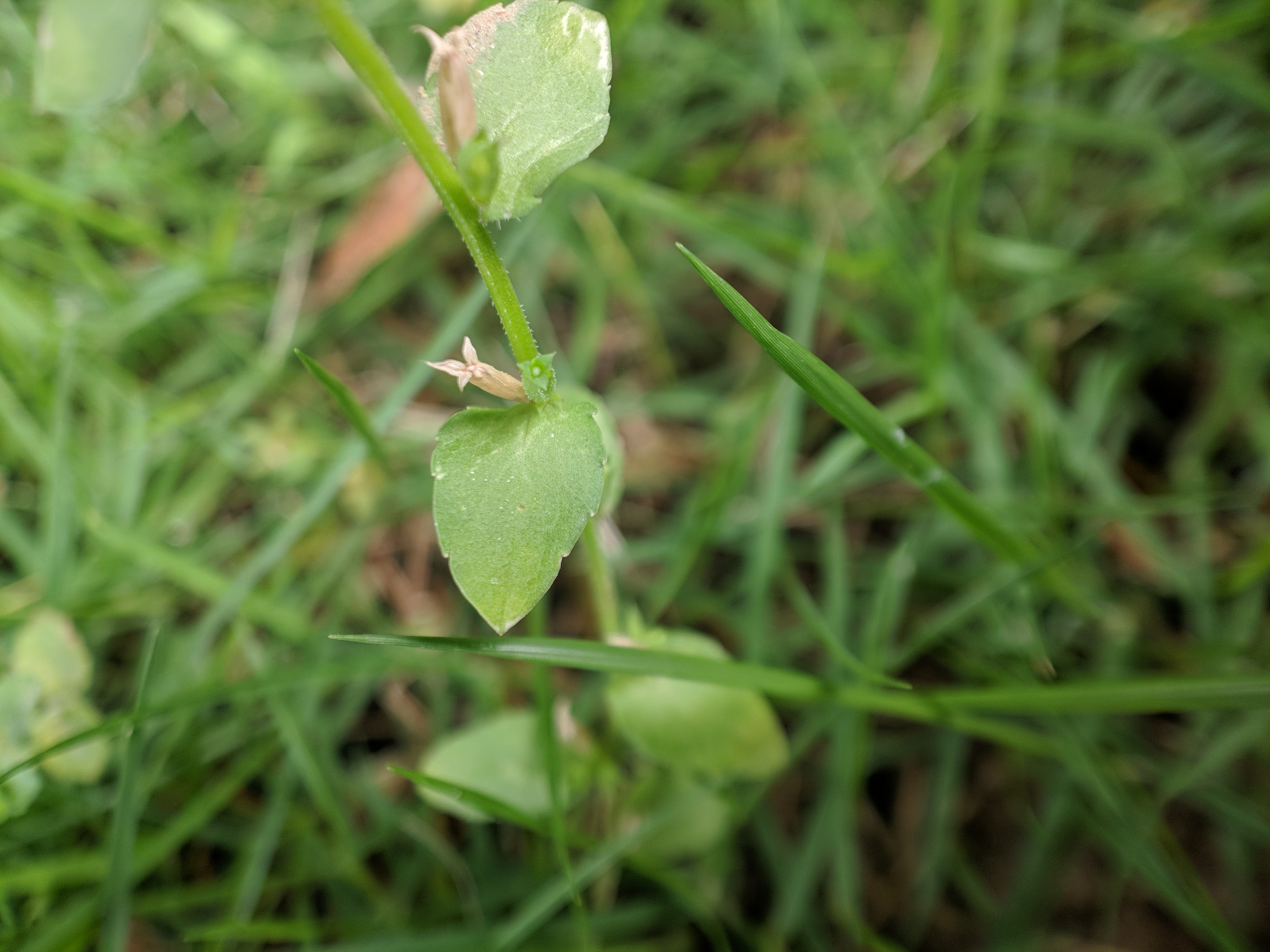
Leaves of Triodanis biflora; alternate pattern

The leaves throughout most of the stem are in an alternate pattern and are directly attached to the stem without a stalk, known as a sessile leaf. However, there can occasionally be a pair of larger, opposite leaves near the top of the stem. The leaf sizes can range from 5–20 mm long and 2–10 mm wide, where the leaf size gradually decreases moving up the stem. Each leaf itself is cordate and can have a wavy, entire or serrate leaf margin. These descriptions mean that the leaves can have detailed toothing on the exterior or a smooth, curved outline. Similar to the other shaped features on this flower, the leaves are elliptic to narrowly ovate that are pointed at the tip. Small hairs can be found along the undersides of the leaves and along the veins that are usually inconspicuous. The stems and leaves both contain a milky sap, and the flower grows from a single taproot.

== Pollination ==
Due to its cleistogamous floral system, Triodanis biflora does not have very extensive pollinator relationships. Only the solitary, or occasionally multiple open flowers, at the tip of the stem will require pollination to facilitate outcrossing. The other cleistogamous flowers reproduce without any external pollination because the pollen from the stamens will reach the stigma of the female reproductive structure in the same flower. The flowers on this species are generally cosexual, for both the cleistogamous and chasmogamous flowers, which allows for selfing to occur. The stems of the plant are not known to elicit any sort of aromatic compounds, reducing the probability that Triodanis biflora uses its stems as a pollination attraction or defense mechanism.

When pollination does occur, the main vectors include generalized subset of small bees, that could be eusocial or solitary, and generalist flies such as the Syphrid fly. Specifically, these may be the plasterer bee, little carpenter bees, bumblebees, flies, small butterflies, and skippers. Since this flower is not limited to only outcrossing, the form and specialized relation with pollinators is not as important compared to other species of flowers and it allows a variety of different species to carry out its pollination efforts.

== Genetics ==
=== Hybridization ===
Triodanis biflora is a member of the Campanulaceae family and the genus Triodanis, where the other relatives of this species include Triodanis perfoliata, Triodanis holzingeri, Triodanis lamprosperma, Triodanis leptocarpa, and Triodanis texana. Across all of these species in this genus, hybridization between T. biflora and T. perfoliata is the most common because there are minimal barriers preventing the pattern of breeding. Due to the small number of chasmogamous flowers on T. biflora, it may contribute to less gene flow; however, its different breeding strategy may be a driving factor for these hybridization events to occur because there is strong genetic evidence that gene flow is still occurring between the two species. The hybrids created between the cross of these two species are fertile and viable, allowing natural hybrids to exist in the environment. It is also because of this reason that scholars can categorize T. biflora as a variation or even the same species as T. perfoliata.

=== Evolution ===
A key feature of Triodanis biflora is that the genes for seed type express a smooth, lustrous seed coat. This defining characteristic has evolved across the Triodanis genus because this type of seed coat developed from the ancestral trait of matriculate, or rough, seed coats. Due to populations of T. biflora existing in more southern regions, this phenotype has expanded from being traditionally in Northern locations to now being found in the south. In addition to being predominately found in southern regions, T. biflora has different phenology patterns compared to other Triodanis species. For instance, the flowering time for T. biflora is typically earlier than its relatives because of the local abiotic and biotic influences of their environment. The increasing temperatures from climate change may also be strongly impact their flowering time as they may have to adapt more rapidly to the changing environmental conditions; however, the fruiting time has remained relatively constant even with temperatures rising. Cleistogamy floral systems may also be more sensitive to environmental factors, such as light and resource availability, which is important to consider for the future patterns of T. biflora.
