= John Seymour (author) =

Self-sufficiency author and pioneer (1914–2004)

John Seymour (12 June 1914 – 14 September 2004) was a British author and pioneer in the self-sufficiency movement. In 1976, he wrote The Complete Book of Self-Sufficiency.

He had multiple roles as a writer, broadcaster, environmentalist, agrarian, smallholder and activist; a rebel against: consumerism, industrialisation, genetically modified organisms, cities, motor cars; an advocate for: self-reliance, personal responsibility, self-sufficiency, conviviality (food, drink, dancing and singing), gardening, caring for the Earth and for the soil.

== Early life ==
Seymour was born in Hampstead, London, England; His father was Albert Angus Turbayne, a skilled bookbinder and designer. His parents separated and his mother, Christine Owens, remarried and the family moved to the seaside town of Frinton-on-Sea in north-east Essex. It was however surrounded by agricultural land, and the life led by those on the land and in small boats laid a foundation for his later vision of a simple cottage economy with farming and fishing providing the essentials of life.

After schooling in England and Switzerland, he studied agriculture at Wye College, In 1934, at the age of 20, he went to Southern Africa where he held a succession of jobs: a farmhand and then manager of a sheep farm, a deckhand and skipper of a snoek fishing boat operating from Namibia (then South-West Africa) along the Skeleton Coast, a copper mine worker in Zambia (then Northern Rhodesia), and a worker for the government veterinary service. Whilst in Africa he spent some time with bushmen where he gained friendship and an insight into the life of hunter gatherers.

== 1939 to 1951 ==
At the start of World War II in 1939, Seymour travelled to Kenya where he enlisted in the Kenya Regiment, and was posted to the King's African Rifles. He fought against Italian troops in the Abyssinian Campaign in Ethiopia. The regiment was then posted to Sri Lanka (formerly Ceylon) and afterwards to Burma, where allied forces were fighting against Japan. For Seymour the war ended on a low note; he expressed his disgust when the Allies used nuclear bombs on Hiroshima and Nagasaki.

On his return to Britain after the war Seymour worked for a while on a Thames sailing barge 'Cambria', skippered by Bob Roberts, operating around the south and east coasts of England, where he picked up the folk songs of a disappearing occupation. After working as a labour officer for the War Agricultural Executive Committee finding agricultural work for German prisoners of war who had still not returned home, he started writing and broadcasting on the BBC Home Service. He travelled overland to India for the BBC, gaining experience of the Subsistence agriculture still common in eastern Europe and Asia. His experiences on that journey led to his first book, The Hard Way to India, published in 1951.

== The Smallholdings ==
Seymour was living aboard a Dutch sailing smack when he married Sally Medworth, an Australian potter and artist in 1954. In this they travelled around the waterways and rivers of England, journeys later described in Sailing through England. As their first daughter grew older they felt that a land-base would be more suitable. They leased two isolated cottages on 5 acres (2.0 ha) of land near Orford in Suffolk. These 5-acres are still called Seymour's Bit by the current owner. The manner in which they developed self-sufficiency on this smallholding is recounted in The Fat of the Land (1961). At the end of the 1960s, Seymour, along with other radical voices like Herbert Read, Edward Goldsmith, Leopold Kohr and Fritz Schumacher, provided a stream of articles for the journal Resurgence edited from 1966 to 1970 by John Papworth.

In 1964 the family moved to a farm near Newport, Pembrokeshire. The 1970s saw Seymour's publication rate reach its peak. In 1973 John and Sally wrote Self-Sufficiency and in 1976 The Complete Book of Self-Sufficiency was published. Appearing shortly after the publication of E.F. Schumacher's Small Is Beautiful: A Study of Economics As If People Mattered (1973) and The Good Life's first showing on British television (1975), the sales of the book exceeded all expectations. It was also set to establish the reputation of two young publishers, Christopher Dorling and Peter Kindersley who had commissioned and edited the work. In addition to self-sufficiency he wrote four guide books in the Companion Guide series.

John also made many television programmes: an early series followed the footsteps of George Borrow's Wild Wales (1862). In the early 1980s he spent three years making the BBC series Far From Paradise (with Herbert Girardet) which examined the history of human impact on the environment.

His farm in Wales welcomed visitors seeking guidance on the smallholder's life, a project which continued when he moved to County Wexford in Ireland. Here in 1999 he was taken to court for destroying a crop of GM sugar beet. For the last years of his life, he lived back on his old Pembrokeshire farm with his daughter's family. He died there on 14 September 2004 and is buried in the top field in an orchard that he planted.

== Legacy ==
His obituary in the Guardian said:

John was as much at home in the humblest house on a hillside, as in the manor house of landed gentry. He was like a force of nature, always willing to listen, always interested in learning about new — or very old — ways of working the land. He was a one-man rebellion against modernism. Herbert Girardet, 2005.

== Bibliography ==
- The Hard Way to India (1951). London: Eyre & Spottiswoode.
- Boys in the Bundu (1955) London: Harrap. (With illustrations by Sally Seymour)
- Round About India (1955). London: Eyre & Spottiswoode.
- One Man's Africa (1956). London: Eyre & Spottiswoode.
- Sailing Through England (1956). London: Eyre & Spottiswoode. (With illustrations by Sally Seymour)
- The Fat of the Land (1961). London: Faber & Faber. (With illustrations by Sally Seymour)
- On My Own Terms (1963). London: Faber & Faber. An autobiography.
- Willynilly to the Baltic (1965). Edinburgh: William Blackwood & Sons.
- Voyage into England (1966). Newton Abbott: David & Charles.
- The Companion Guide to East Anglia (1970). London: Collins.
- About Pembrokeshire (1971). TJ Whalley.
- The Book of Boswell - autobiography of a gypsy (1970). London: Gollancz. (Author: Silvester Gordon Boswell, Ed. John Seymour)
- Self-Sufficiency (1973). London: Faber & Faber. (With Sally Seymour.) The original self-sufficiency guide.
- Farming for Self-Sufficiency - Independence on a 5-Acre Farm (1973). Schocken Books. (with Sally Seymour) (the American version of 'Self-sufficiency')
- The Companion Guide to the Coast of South-West England (1974). London: Collins.
- The Companion Guide to the Coast of North-East England (1974). London: Collins.
- The Companion Guide to the Coast of South-East England (1975). London: Collins.
- The Complete Book of Self-Sufficiency. London: Faber & Faber. 1976.
- Bring Me My Bow (1977). London: Turnstone Books.
- Keep It Simple (1977). Pant Mawr: Black Pig Press.
- The Countryside Explained (1977). London: Faber & Faber. (With illustrations by Sally Seymour)
- I’m A Stranger Here Myself - the story of a Welsh farm (1978). London: Faber & Faber. (With illustrations by Sally Seymour)
- The Self-Sufficient Gardener (1978). London: Dorling Kindersley
- John Seymour's Gardening Book (1978). London: G.Whizzard: Distributed by Deutsch.
- Gardener's Delight (1978). London: Michael Joseph.
- Getting It Together - a guide for new settlers (1980). London: Michael Joseph.
- The Lore of the Land (1982). Weybridge: Whittet. (With illustrations by Sally Seymour.)
- Die Lerchen singen so schön (1982). München: Heyne Science Fiction Bibliothek (English version, unpublished: The Larks They Sang Melodious, novel)
- The Woodlander (1983). London: Sidgwick & Jackson. (With illustrations by Sally Seymour.)
- The Smallholder (1983). London: Sidgwick & Jackson. (With illustrations by Sally Seymour.)
- The Shepherd (1983). London: Sidgwick & Jackson. (With illustrations by Sally Seymour.)
- The Forgotten Arts (1984). London: Dorling Kindersley.
- Far from Paradise - the story of man's impact on the environment (1986). London: BBC Publications. (with Herbert Girardet)
- Blueprint for a Green Planet' (1987). London: Dorling Kindersley. (with Herbert Girardet)
- The Forgotten Household Crafts (1987). London: Dorling Kindersley.
- England Revisited - a countryman's nostalgic journey (1988). London: Dorling Kindersley.
- The Ultimate Heresy (1989). Bideford: Green Books.
- Changing Lifestyles - living as though the world mattered (1991). London: Gollancz.
- Rural Life - pictures from the past (1991). London: Collins & Brown.
- Blessed Isle - one man's Ireland (1992). London: Collins.
- Seymour's Seamarks (1995). Rye: Academic Inn Books. (with illustrations by Connie Lindquist)
- Retrieved from the Future (1996). London: New European,
- Rye from the Water's Edge (1996). Rye: Academic Inn Books. (with illustrations by Connie Lindquist)
- Playing It For Laughs - a book of doggerel (1999). San Francisco: Metanoia Press. (with illustrations by Kate Seymour)
- The Forgotten Arts And Crafts (2001). London: Dorling Kindersley.
- The New Complete Book of Self-Sufficiency (2002). London: Dorling Kindersley. (with Will Sutherland)
- The Self-Sufficient Life and How to Live It (2003). London: Dorling Kindersley. (with Will Sutherland)
- The Fat of the Land (2008). Carningli Press (With illustrations by Sally Seymour)
- I'm a Stranger Here Myself The Story of a Welsh Farm (2011). Carningli Press (cover by Sally Seymour) John Seymour's family website
- The Fat of the Land (2017). Little Toller Books, new edition with a foreword by Hugh Fearnley-Whittingstall.
