= Venus's looking-glass =

Venus's looking-glass is a common name for several plant species including:

- All members of the genus Triodanis
- Legousia speculum-veneris
