= OLCC =

OLCC may refer to:

- Oregon Liquor and Cannabis Commission
- Orthodox Lutheran Confessional Conference
- Old Leightonians Cricket Club
