= Sheepdrove Organic Farm =

Farm near Lambourn, West Berkshire, England

Coordinates: 51.5339°N 1.4837°W

Sheepdrove Organic Farm is a farm near Lambourn, West Berkshire, England. The farm gained a public profile when Juliet and Peter Kindersley took the UK government to court over its handling of the 2001 outbreak of foot-and-mouth disease. They also campaigned for a different approach to the 2007 FMD outbreak.

The Kindersleys established Sheepdrove Organic Farm during the late 1990s after the acquisition of land neighbouring their home at Sheepdrove Farmhouse. The holding was put through organic conversion under Soil Association UK certification and uses an organic rotation system with a broad range of livestock and crops and has a policy of environmental sustainability.

== Location ==
The farm is situated on 900 hectares of chalk downland in an area that crosses the boundary of Oxfordshire and Berkshire, near the village of Lambourn. The local landscape is recognised as nationally important, being in the North Wessex Downs Area of Outstanding Natural Beauty.

== The business ==
It is a diversified farm, producing crops and livestock, processing and marketing its food, and with additional enterprises. On the site are Sheepdrove Event Venue, facilities for on-site butchery, organic herb plots, and rented housing.

Sheepdrove Event Venue was opened in June 2004 by Prince Charles. It has a timber frame, cedar roof shingles, wooden panel interiors, a wall made of re-utilised chalk and panels made of recycled plastic. The building gained the 2005 Special Award for Sustainable Architecture from the Civic Trust Awards. The venue is licensed by West Berkshire for weddings.

Projects at the farm include:

- The reedbed water treatment system: waste water from the farm, conference centre, processing unit and houses is treated in the constructed wetland of a reedbed system.

Sheepdrove has entered the Defra agri-environment schemes to help support farmland biodiversity including special measures to restore habitats such as Sheepdrove Rare Butterfly Project which aims to attract marsh fritillaries. The farm has records of 25 species of butterfly, 10 species of bee, 6 species of bat and 104 species of bird (including 5 types of owl). Notable plants include the goldilocks buttercup, field gromwell and Venus's looking-glass.
