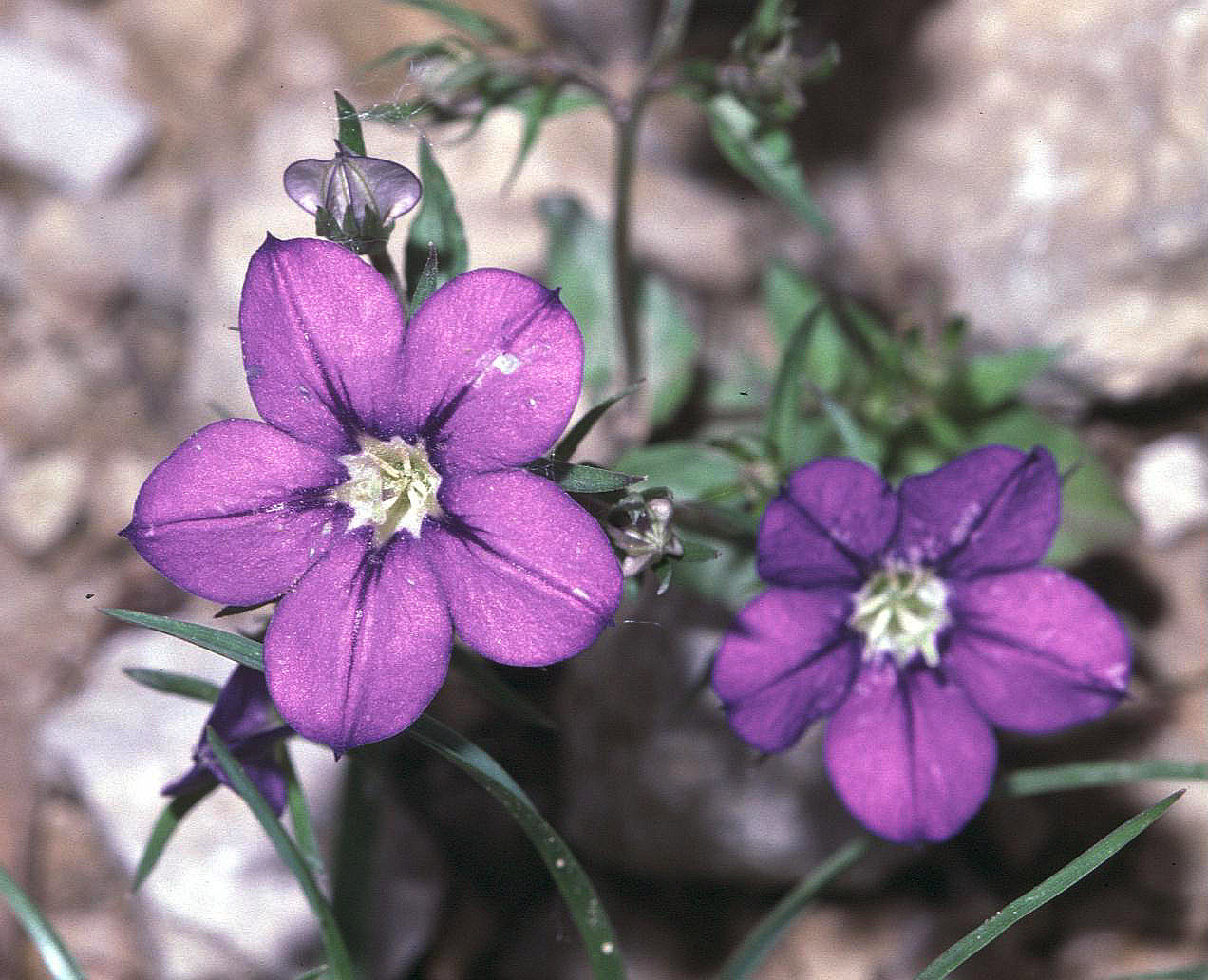

Scientific classification
- Kingdom: Plantae
- Clade: Tracheophytes
- Clade: Angiosperms
- Clade: Eudicots
- Clade: Asterids
- Order: Asterales
- Family: Campanulaceae
- Subfamily: Campanuloideae
- Genus: Legousia; Durande, 1782

Species
- 7 species, see text

= Legousia =

Venus' looking glass

Genus of flowering plants

Legousia (Venus' looking-glass) is a genus of flowering plants in the family Campanulaceae, native to Europe. Species in the genus used to be placed under genus Specularia along with plants in genera Triodanis and Heterocodon as well as some species in genus Campanula. However, the division has been confirmed evolutionarily comprehensive by a Campanulaceae phylogeny based on DNA molecular evidence.

== Species ==
Legousia species include:

- Legousia falcata (Ten.) Fritsch ex Janch. 1907
- Legousia hybrida (L.) Delarbre 1800
- Legousia julianii (Batt.) Briq. 1931
- Legousia pentagonia (L.) Thell. 1908
- Legousia scabra (Lowe) Gamisans 1985
- Legousia skvortsovii Proskur. 1980
- Legousia snogerupii Tan, Biel & Sfikas. 2015
- Legousia speculum-veneris (L.) Durande ex Vill. 1786

A 2019 article in Willdenowia proposes that L. pentagonia should be considered as a subspecies of L. speculum-veneris, L. castellana and L. scabra be reduced to L. falcata and L. skvortsovii be reduced to L. hybrida.

== Synonyms ==
- Apenula Neck. – Elem. Bot. 1: 234 (1790).
- Legouzia Delarbre – Fl. Auvergne, ed. 2: 45 (1800).
- Specularia Heist. ex A.DC. – Monogr. Campan.: 344 (1830), nom. superfl.
- Pentagonia Möhring ex Kuntze – Revis. Gen. Pl. 2: 381 (1891), nom. illeg.
