= Alan Gore =

Australian-born British architectural designer and garden historian

- Born: Alan Charles Corbet Gore; 27 September 1926; Queensland, Australia
- Died: 5 April 2006 (aged 79)
- Education: Wellington College; Architectural Association School of Architecture (did not graduate)
- Occupations: Architectural designer, garden historian
- Parent(s): Francis Gore; Kirstine

Alan Gore (27 September 1926 – 5 April 2006) was an Australian-born British architectural designer and garden historian. As a partner in Gore, Gibberd & Saunders, he restored many historic houses in Britain and France. He was the author of several books, lectured in North America and Australia, and led tours of historic houses in England. He became known as "the king of the kitchen" for his role as "a pioneer of the designer kitchen."

== Early life ==
Alan Gore was born on 27 September 1926 in Queensland, Australia. His father, Francis Gore, was a tea planter in Assam in India before World War I; he subsequently owned a large farm in Queensland and eventually retired in Drinkstone, Suffolk, where he raised polo ponies on his farm. His mother, Kirstine, was a painter. He had a brother, Bobby, who later worked for the National Trust. Their father died when Gore was eleven.

Gore was educated at Wellington College. During World War II, he was a Bevin Boy in The Dukeries. He subsequently served in the Royal Army Educational Corps, and he taught at the Knightsbridge Barracks. He studied at the Architectural Association School of Architecture, but never graduated.

== Career ==
Gore became an architectural designer, having grown fond of historic houses in Nottinghamshire during the war. In 1956, he started his own practice with Harry Spencer. By 1964, it became known as Gore, Gibberd & Saunders. The trio restored historic houses in Britain and France. He re-designed the facade of the Château de la Croix des Gardes in Cannes in the Palladian architectural style as well as the swimming-pool, under the guidance of architect Andreï Svetchine.

Gore also worked with interior designer John Beresford Fowler until 1977. While working with John Prizeman, Gore became interested in the design of modern kitchens. He became known as "the king of the kitchen" for his role as "a pioneer of the designer kitchen."

Gore wrote The English Garden and The English House, two documentary series for Thames Television in the 1980s. He was also an advisor to several television programs, including one about Petworth House. He was the author of several books, lectured in North America and Australia, and conducted tours of historic houses in England.

== Personal life and death ==
Gore had a wife, Ann, who worked as a cooking instructor and fashion writer, and two sons. He died on 5 April 2006.

== Works ==
- The English Garden (1979)
- The History of English Interiors (1991)
- English Interiors: An Illustrated History (1985)
- The English House (1985)
