= Foreign Reporter of the Year =

Press award

The Foreign Reporter of the Year award is one of the honours given annually by The Press Awards in the UK.

== History ==
Over the years, the categories have increased from 3 in 1962, to 31 in 2014. There have been many different awards in the area of international and foreign reporting, with some years having more than one; the first category was International Reporter of the Year in the 1966 awards, the current is Foreign Reporter of the Year.

The 2007 awards saw the introduction of an International Journalist of the Year category; unlike the earlier International Reporter of the Year category from 1966-1989, this category honours journalists from countries outside the UK.

=== Foreign Reporter of the Year ===
Foreign Reporter of the Year, previously Foreign Journalist of the Year (in memory of David Holden) and David Holden International Reporter of the Year.

- 2024 Louise Callaghan The Sunday Times
- 2023 Bel Trew, The Independent
- 2020 Anthony Loyd, The Times
- 2019 Anthony Loyd, The Times
- 2018 Anthony Loyd, The Times
- 2017 Emma Graham-Harrison, The Guardian
- 2016 Anthony Loyd, The Times
- 2015 Ian Birrell, The Mail on Sunday
- 2014 Patrick Cockburn, The Independent and The i
- 2013 Anthony Loyd, The Times
- 2012 Marie Colvin, The Sunday Times
- 2011 Hala Jaber, The Sunday Times
- 2010 Charles Clover, Financial Times
- 2009 Marie Colvin, The Sunday Times
- 2008 Dan McDougall, freelance
- 2007 Ghaith Abdul-Ahad, The Guardian
- 2006 Christina Lamb, The Sunday Times
- 2005 Hala Jaber, The Sunday Times
- 2004 Hala Jaber, The Sunday Times
- 2003 James Meek, The Guardian
- 2002 Mark Franchetti, The Sunday Times
- 2001 Christina Lamb, The Sunday Telegraph
- 2000 Marie Colvin, The Sunday Times
- 1999 Jon Swain, The Sunday Times
- 1998 John Lichfield, Independent on Sunday
- 1997 Anton Antonowicz, The Daily Mirror
- 1996 Ed Vulliamy, The Guardian
- 1995 Robert Fisk, The Independent
- 1994 Robert Fisk, The Independent and Independent on Sunday
- 1993 Shyam Bhatia, The Observer
- 1992 Maggie O’Kane and Ed Vulliamy, The Guardian
- 1991 Jonathan Steele, The Guardian
- 1990 Quentin Peel, Financial Times
- 1989 Rupert Cornwall, The Independent
- 1988 David Marsh, Financial Times
- 1987 Dermot Purgavie, Daily Mail
- 1986 Simon Hoggart, The Observer
- 1985 Mark Frankland, The Observer
- 1984 Jurek Martin, Financial Times
- 1983 Mark Frankland, The Observer
- 1982 Trevor Fishlock, The Times
- 1981 Joseph Finklestone, Jewish Chronicle
- 1980 Michael Binyon, The Times
- 1978 Altaf Gauhar and Ian Wright, The Guardian

=== International Journalist of the Year ===
Unlike the other categories, this category is for non-UK journalists.

- 2011 Amir Taheri
- 2010 Ibrahim Essa, Al-Dustour
- 2009 J. S. Tissainayagam, North Eastern Monthly
- 2008 Mohammad Sadegh Kaboudvand, Iran
- 2007 Emadeddin Baghi, Iran

=== Foreign Stringer of the Year ===
Foreign Stringer of the Year, previously Foreign Stringer of the Year (in memory of David Blundy), and David Blundy Award

- 1994 Richard Shears, Daily Mail
- 1993 Anthony Loyd, The Times
- 1992 Allister Sparks, The Observer
- 1991 Victoria Clark, The Observer
- 1990 Mark Huband, The Guardian

=== International Reporter of the Year ===
- 1989 Jonathan Mirsky, The Observer
- 1988 Jon Swain, The Sunday Times
- 1987 Robert Fisk, The Times
- 1986 Trevor Fishlock, The Daily Telegraph
- 1985 David Beresford, The Guardian
- 1984 Colin Smith, The Observer
- 1983 Ross Benson, Daily Express
- 1982 Robert Fisk, The Times
- 1981 Jonathan Steele, The Guardian
- 1980 Robert Fisk, The Times
- 1979 Robert Fisk, The Times
- 1978 Peter Lewis, Daily Mail
- 1977 Robin Smyth, The Observer
- 1976 Peter Niesewand, The Guardian
- 1975 Martin Woollacott, The Guardian
- 1974 Colin Smith, The Observer
- 1973 Peter Niesewand, The Guardian
- 1972 John Fairhall, The Guardian
- 1971 Peter Hazelhurst, The Times and Gavin Young, The Observer
- 1970 John Pilger, Daily Mirror
- 1969 Murray Sayle, The Sunday Times
- 1968 Walter Partington, Daily Express
- 1967 Christopher Dobson, Daily Mail
- 1966 Louis Heren, The Times
