= Peter Nienow =

- Scientific career
- Fields: Glaciology
- Institutions: University of Edinburgh

Peter Nienow FRSE is a Professor in glaciology at the University of Edinburgh. His research focuses on how glaciers and ice sheets respond to climate change.

He was educated at Leighton Park School and Cambridge University where he gained a Blue for hockey.

He is a winner of the Polar Medal, an award given to British citizens in recognition of acquisition of knowledge about polar regions, and who have undertaken polar expeditions in extreme hardship.

== Awards and honours ==
In 2019 he was elected a Fellow of the Royal Society of Edinburgh.
