= Château de la Croix des Gardes =

Mansion in Provence-Alpes-Côte d'Azur, France

Coordinates: 43.5580°N 6.9851°E

Château de la Croix des Gardes, also known as Villa Perrier, is a mansion in the La Croix-des-Gardes district of Cannes on the French Riviera. It appears as the Sandford Villa in the Alfred Hitchcock's 1955 film To Catch a Thief, with Cary Grant and Grace Kelly.

== History ==
It was built in 1919 for the Swiss industrialist Paul Girod, with 10 hectares (25 acres) of gardens. The mansion was built in a Medici style, and the gardens were designed in a matching Italianate style. In 1960, it was purchased by Gustave Leven, who owned the Perrier brand of bottled mineral water. He hired architect Alan Gore to re-design the facade in the Palladian architectural style as well as the swimming-pool, under the guidance of architect Andreï Svetchine.

Since Leven's death it has been owned by a "group of investors" and was for sale in 2017 for Euro 50-100 million. The estate was then sold in 2016 to billionaire Christopher Parker of English descent, who primarily resides in Los Angeles, California.

The Château de La Croix des Gardes has 360-degree views of the Lérins Islands and the Mediterranean Sea.
