= Martin Woollacott =

British journalist (1939–2021)

Martin Woollacott (29 April 1939 – 24 March 2021) was a British journalist. He was the foreign correspondent and foreign editor for The Guardian newspaper.

In 1975, he was nominated Foreign Reporter of the Year for his coverage of the Vietnam war. In 1991, he received a James Cameron Award for his coverage of Kurdistan.

== Books ==
- After Suez: Adrift in the American Century (I.B. Tauris, 2006).
