= Shyam Bhatia =

British war journalist

- Born: 1950 (age 75–76); New Delhi, India
- Education: The Doon School; University of Oxford
- Occupations: Journalist, foreign correspondent, war reporter, books author
- Awards: Foreign Reporter of the Year (1993)

Shyam Bhatia (born 1950) is an Indian-born British journalist, writer and war reporter based in London. He has reported from conflict zones such as the Middle East, Afghanistan and Sudan, and is a former diplomatic editor of The Observer. He has also served as US correspondent and Foreign Editor of the Bangalore-based Deccan Herald and Editor of Asian Affairs magazine in London.

Bhatia was educated at The Doon School in India and Leighton Park School in England before going to the University of Oxford. A contributor to The Times, Mail on Sunday, Politico, Deccan Herald and The Citizen, he is also a columnist for the Indian Express. He has published several books based on his war reporting, and a political biography of the former Prime Minister of Pakistan, Benazir Bhutto (who was his contemporary at Oxford). In 1993, he won the Foreign Reporter of the Year for his coverage of the suffering of the Marsh Arabs in Southern Iraq. His May 2021 keynote interview about the spread of Covid with Dr Jerome Kim of the International Vaccine Institute was published by The Wire and broadcast on YouTube.Currently, London correspondent of The Tribune. His latest book and first novel is The Quiet Correspondent, published in 2026 by Juggernaut.

== Bibliography ==
- Bhatia, Shyam (1980). India's Nuclear Bomb. Vikas. ISBN 978-0706909722.
- Bhatia, Shyam (1999). Brighter Than the Baghdad Sun. Little, Brown. ISBN 978-0316852654.
- Bhatia, Shyam (2002). Saddam's Bomb. Sphere. ISBN 978-0751534931.
- Bhatia, Shyam (2008). Goodbye Shahzadi: A Political Biography of Benazir Bhutto. Lotus. ISBN 978-8174366580.
- Bhatia, Shyam (2017). Nuclear Rivals in the Middle East. Routledge. ISBN 978-1138655430.
- Bhatia, Shyam (2016). Bullets and Bylines: From the Frontlines of Kabul, Delhi, Damascus and Beyond. Speaking Tiger. ISBN 978-9385755538.
