= Old Leightonians Cricket Club =

Team information
- Founded: 1977
- Home ground: Leighton Park School, Reading, Berkshire
- Official website: Old Leightonians CC

The Old Leightonians Cricket Club is a cricket club for former pupils of Leighton Park School, Reading, Berkshire. As of 2020, the club has 197 members, as well as eleven honorary members. The club does not compete in league cricket and thus most of its fixtures are friendly matches against a variety of opponents – from teams in the Reading area (including Leighton Park School's 1st XI) through to sides in the club's current touring destinations: the East Midlands, Devon, Kent and Nantes, France. Home games are played at Leighton Park School.

== Club history ==
=== Pre-1977 ===
Old Leightonians cricket dates back to 1899, when a team of former pupils from Leighton Park School took on the school's 1st XI for the first time. Since then the fixture has been contested annually, with a few exceptions, and for many years it represented the only chance for former pupils to play under the Old Leightonians banner – although a number of other matches, including some in the Netherlands, were played by Old Leightonians sides in the 1920s and 1930s. It was not until 1976, at a game between the OLs and NatWest Bank, that the idea of staging regular Old Leightonians fixtures against other teams each season (in addition to the annual fixture against the school) was first put forward, and this led to the formation of the club in 1977.

=== The inaugural season ===
The Old Leightonians Cricket Club was founded by Graham Carter and Martin Wigram on Sunday 27 February 1977 at the Jolly Farmer pub in Puttenham, Surrey, with Carter taking the jobs of Club Secretary and Statistician while Wigram assumed the role of Fixture Secretary. A list of eight fixtures was drawn up for the 1977 season, beginning with the annual fixture against the Leighton Park School 1st XI. Held on 21 May, a side made up of Leighton Park alumni from the 1950s, 1960s and 1970s was assembled to take part in the club's inaugural match. Dominic Beer faced the first ball and Andrew Moss top-scored with 51 not out as the OLCC declared on 177–8. In reply, the school 1st XI were well set on 106–1 before the OL captain, Derek Brewer, swung the match decisively in the old boys' favour with a devastating spell of 14–8–18–7, which remained the best figures for over 30 years. Brewer finished the match with a hat-trick as the school 1st XI were bowled out for 128, giving the OLCC a 49-run victory. Later that season the club embarked on its first tour, playing three games in Suffolk at the start of July.

=== The early years ===
Throughout the late 1970s and early 1980s, the club steadily grew in membership and expanded its fixture list. In 1978 the club entered the Brewers Company Cup, a limited-overs cup competition for former pupils of smaller independent schools, a move that added some more competitive cricket to the club's calendar. This usually came in the form of just one match each season since the OLCC did not enjoy any great success in the cup, a fact underlined in 1981 when the club suffered its heaviest ever defeat, losing to Denstone Wanderers by 253 runs. Though the annual tour to Suffolk only lasted until 1979, a replacement touring venue was found in the West Country in 1982, beginning a run of annual tours to the area that would not end until 2007.

By 1986, the club's membership had risen to 75 and to mark the successful completion of ten seasons, a special dinner was held at which the guest speaker was the Test Match Special Scorer Bill Frindall. Meanwhile, the club's status as a hotbed of cricketing joviality was beginning to be defined. The club's first tour to the West Country had seen the inauguration of the 'Tour Joker' – an award given to the member of the touring party who was deemed by the tour managers to have caused the most amusement to his fellow tourists – and by 1986 this prize had become a much cherished and sought after club institution.

=== The members turn to Beer ===
After ten years as club secretary, Graham Carter made way for Dominic Beer as the OLCC entered a new era that began with an exciting new venture: the club's first overseas tour, which came in the form of a weekend in Paris at the start of the 1987 season. Alongside the annual West Country tour, Beer's tenure as secretary would see the club return to Suffolk and add the East Midlands to its list of touring destinations. On the field, the early and mid-1980s had provided the OLCC with a new generation of club stalwarts who ensured the club continued to thrive. Success in the Brewers Cup remained elusive, however, as the club failed to advance beyond the first round for six years in a row.

Having stepped aside as club secretary, Carter became the club's president in 1988 and continued to oversee its progress. To mark his 50th birthday, a special game was held at Leighton Park in 1996 that was to see records tumble. In a day's play that began at 11:00 am and finished just a few minutes before 9:00 pm (partly due to a two-and-a-half-hour lunch break), 635 runs were scored, 167 of which were contributed by Andrew Moss in a club record innings that allowed the OLCC to record a thrilling four-wicket victory against the President's invitation XI.

=== Samuels takes charge ===
Dominic Beer was succeeded as club secretary by Phil Samuels at the start of 1997, and although his tenure began with an inauspicious return on the field that season (the club managed only one win, and that came in its first match of the year), the change reflected the shift in playing membership as a wave of school leavers from the mid-1990s – known to the senior members as 'jolly juniors' – began what would become long and fruitful careers in the OLCC. As well as contributing on the field, the younger generation were also brought in as office-holders as well as carrying out the duties of match and tour managers.

The culture of touring soon found itself in the rudest of health, as the now annual trips to the East Midlands and the West Country were supplemented in alternate years with a long weekend in Saumur, France. Even though three tours were in the club's schedule every other year, appetite for touring remained strong and the 1999 edition of the West Country tour took with it 24 members.

Even in the Brewers Cup, the customary first-round exit was no longer a certainty as the club engaged in a series of astonishing battles. The highest scoring of these came in 2001 when the club's highest ever total – 337 all out – was unfortunately 40 short of the Old Bloxhamists' gargantuan effort, and the OLs were unlucky to be defeated twice on the now discredited run rate system, in 2000 and 2004. Then, in 2005, the OLCC was defeated by the old boys of Taunton School, only to then discover after the match that the opposition's No 3 batsman, who made 171 from just 113 balls, had not even attended said institution. Taunton were duly kicked out of the tournament allowing the OLs to progress.

But the most amazing of these Brewers Cup encounters came at St Edmund's, Ware, in 2002. Chasing 252 to win, another first-round cup exit for the Old Leightonians looked likely at 94–7, and a racing certainty at 163–9. But No 9 batsman Michael Thomas, who had only been drafted into the side at the last minute, smashed a quite remarkable unbeaten 102 from 70 balls, and with No 11 Julian Shackel swatting a composed 27 not out, the OLs pulled off a one-wicket win in the penultimate over.

=== All change ===
All was not well in the Brewers Cup competition, however. The Taunton incident in 2005 merely served to heighten the issue of 'ringers' playing for some of the competing clubs and the following year proved the final straw for the cup committee as a series of withdrawals – that allowed the OLCC to reach the semi-finals without even playing a game – contributed to their decision to close the competition. (The OLCC had raised a full team of bona fide Old Leightonians for every fixture they had contested in the competition since joining in 1978, making the decision to wind up the competition all the more difficult for the committee's chairman, Robert Stein, himself a stalwart member and subsequently a Life Vice President of the OLCC).

An unsuccessful experiment with a replacement competition ended in farcical circumstances in 2007, which gave rise to the club founding its own cup competition. Thus the Old Leightonians Challenge Trophy was inaugurated in 2008 and has since been contested by the Old Leightonians, the Leighton Park School 1st XI and the 'Parktimers' – a team comprising Leighton Park staff and guests – in a 20-over format. The Parktimers won the first two editions.

Elsewhere, there were other major changes in the life of the OLCC. After 26 consecutive seasons in the West Country, the club members chose to relocate its main tour, which by now had become a week-long trip at the end of August, to the north Norfolk coast. New fixtures and a new touring base were found and these proved to be an excellent addition to the calendar.

=== Norfolk and the new age ===
Taking up residence for one week a year, the OLs first attended the Links Hotel, West Runton in 2008. With a great set of fixtures and local attractions, the Old Leightonians quickly settled into their new annual tour; venue highlights to include a game at Sandringham and an evening on Cromer pier, there were plenty more highlights to be found back at the hotel, such as the tale of 'Dangerous' of his infamous night on tour.

Much as it had done in mid- to late 1990s, the club received another injection of youth from 2008 to 2009 leavers. These leavers were to form the spine of the side for the next few years, and within their number were two club record breakers with both bat and ball. Whilst on Norfolk tour against Tom Johnson's XI in 2010, Shashank Narayanasamy recorded a new OLCC best 8-36, including a hat-trick. Not to be outshined, James Barratt broke the previous club record by blasting 170* not out in 2012 at Leighton Park.

There was a shake-up of the clubs roles, with James Barratt taking the reins as club secretary, Nick Hayles assuming the roles of club treasurer and availability secretary and Seb Powers becoming the new club statistician.

In the OLCT competition, Pete Bulteel led his Parktimer 'Staff' XI to seven consecutive trophies in as many years. It took a special invitational XI led by longtime Head of Sports Mark Simmons in 2015 to finally end this run. Simmons led a Field House XI to victory in their only two games to date and a new name was engraved for the first time in the competition's history. Finally in 2016, in the competition's 9th year, Seb Powers was able to finally lead the OLCC to their maiden victory in the competition with a 2–0 series win over the Parktimers XI.

By the middle of the 2016 season, the Old Leightonians had welcomed nearly 190 ex-pupils back to represent the club and had lengthened their Honorary membership to 10 members in total!

=== Devon, Kent and the retirement of a legend ===
In 2016, after eight very enjoyable tours of Norfolk, the OLCC took their touring party back to Devon for an extended weekend of cricket and joviality. In addition to this annual tour, a two-day tour of Kent was successfully scheduled and enjoyed by all in 2018. The Kent Tour would occur every two years, alternating with a revived tour of France and the new location of Nantes, starting in 2019.

Coinciding with the retirement from England Cricket of one Sir Alistair Cook, another cricketing colossus decided to hang up their boots in 2018. Andrew 'Mickey' Moss called time on a 41-year OLCC legacy that will always see him regarded as one of the greatest Old Leightonian Cricketers. With nearly 8,500 runs over 358 appearances, Andrew will be sorely missed from the batting lineups of future Match Managers. Early rumours suggested he was taking up a cricket lecturing director role for the OLCC from 2019.

== Club officials and dates of appointment ==
- President: Graham Carter, 1988
- Life Vice Presidents: Robert Stein, 2001; Andrew Moss, 2003; David Pollard, 2004; Dominic Beer, 2009, Richard Newell Price, 2014; Charles Allan, 2014; Phil Samuels, 2014
- Club Secretary: John Crosfield, 2020
- Club Treasurer: Nick Hayles, 2015
- Fixture Secretary: Tom Gillmor, 2018
- Club Statistician: Seb Powers, 2012
- Availability Secretary: Seb Powers, 2021

== Players ==
=== Current players ===
The following table lists OLCC members and honorary members who played at least three games for the club in recent seasons.

The number in the first column refers to that player's unique club number, which is allocated in order of debut date for the club. Note: In the event of more than one player making their first appearance in the same game, the player listed higher in the batting order takes the first available number.

No	Name	Nat	Batting style	Bowling style	Notes
11	Graham Carter	(England)	RHB	OS	
12	Tom Scrase	(England)	RHB	LS	
50	Charles Allan	(England)	LHB	OS	WK
58	Richard Newell Price	(England)	LHB	RM	
62	Chris Pye-Smith	(England)	RHB	SLA	
66	Dayalan Doraisamy	(Sri Lanka)	RHB	RM	
67	Neale Jackson	(England)	RHB	RM	
68	Paul Newell Price	(England)	RHB	RFM	
94	Tom Gillmor	(England)	RHB	LS	WK
99	Geoff Samuels	(England)	RHB	RM	
113	John Acland-Hood	(United Kingdom)	RHB	RM	
121	John Crosfield	(England)	RHB	OS	
148	Nick Hayles	(England)	RHB	OS	WK
149	Kenza Barton	(England)	RHB	OS	
153	James Barratt	(England)	RHB	RMF	
163	Seb Powers	(England)	RHB	RM	
169	Shashank Narayanasamy	(India)	RHB	RFM	
171	Shreyas Narayanasamy	(India)	RHB	OS	
188	Vikesh Patel	(England)	RHB	RFM	
191	Will Mackay	(England)	LHB	RMF	
H5	Ed Carter	(England)	RHB	RF	Honorary member No. 5
H6	Tom Carter	(England)	RHB	RFM	Honorary member No. 6
H7	Bryan Stone	(Italy)	RHB	RM	Honorary member No. 7

=== Notable players ===
- Julian Wood, active 1985–2004. Schoolboy prodigy who broke a number of batting records while at Leighton Park, where he scored a double century for the 1st XI as a 15-year-old. Played for Hampshire from 1989 to 1993, alongside David Gower, Malcolm Marshall, Robin Smith and Mark Nicholas amongst others. Subsequently, played for Berkshire until 2006, captaining the county for the final six years of that time. His highest score for the OLCC came in 1996, when he scored 129 off 93 balls.
- Derek Brewer, active 1977–2005. Stalwart of the OLCC, especially during the early years, making 44 appearances for the club. In the OLCC's first ever game, Brewer claimed 7–18, which for more than 33 years were the best figures recorded by an OLCC bowler. He has the distinction of taking two hat-tricks, in 1977 and 1979. Formerly the chief executive of Nottinghamshire County Cricket Club from 2005 to 2011, Brewer is now the Secretary & chief executive of the MCC.

=== Captains ===
The OLCC does not have club captains as such, but a captain has been elected to lead the side in the various cup competitions in which the club has taken part every year since 1978.

- 1978–80, 1987: Derek Brewer BC
- 1981: David Pollard BC
- 1982–86, 1988–93: Andrew Moss BC
- 1994–97, 1999: Charles Allan BC
- 1998, 2000–05: Paul Newell Price BC
- 2006–08: John Acland-Hood BC, CWT, OLCT
- 2009–10: Phil Samuels OLCT
- 2011–2014: James Barratt OLCT
- 2015: Kenza Barton OLCT
- 2016–18: Seb Powers OLCT

BC – Brewers Cup; CWT – Cricket World Trophy; OLCT – Old Leightonians Challenge Trophy

== Club records ==
The OLCC keeps what is thought to be one of the most comprehensive sets of statistics in club cricket, issuing an annual update of 99+ pages that details a range of records, from every score of 50 or more through to a list of counties (and countries) in which the club has played.

== See also ==
- Leighton Park School

== External sources ==
- Official site
