= David McFarland =

Animal behavior scientist and author

David J. McFarland (sometimes cited as D.J. McFarland; born Dec 31, 1938) is an ethologist and zoologist writer specialising in the field of animal behaviour and more recently the broadening of this understanding to "artificial ethology", links to human AI and robotics.

He was educated at Leighton Park School, the Quaker school at Reading. He is a Fellow at Balliol College, Oxford.

He is the author of a number of leading and influential books including Animal Behaviour: Psychobiology, Ethology, and Evolution, and The Oxford Companion to Animal Behaviour. He is also the author of the Dictionary of Animal Behaviour, published by Oxford Paperback Reference in 2006.

== Bibliography ==
Newest publications are listed first.

- Guilty Robots, Happy Dogs: The Question of Alien Minds (Oxford University Press, USA, 2008), ISBN 978-0-19-921929-2
- Dictionary of Animal Behaviour (Oxford University Press, USA, 2006) ISBN 978-0-19-860721-2
- with co-editor Owen Holland Artificial Ethology (Oxford University Press, UK, 2001). ISBN 0-19-851057-8.
- Animal Behaviour : Psychology, Ethology and Evolution. (Pitman, 1985.) ISBN 0-273-02103-6

* Animal Behaviour: Psychobiology, Ethology and Evolution (Benjamin Cummings, 1998), ISBN 978-0-582-32732-0

- Intelligent Behavior in Animals and Robots (Complex Adaptive Systems) (The MIT Press, 1993), ISBN 978-0-262-13293-0
- Le comportement animal (French & European Pubns, 1990) ISBN 978-0-7859-7802-2
- Problems of Animal Behaviour (Harlow, Essex; New York: Longman Scientific & Technical, Wiley, 1989), ISBN 0-470-21209-8
- Oxford Companion to Animal Behavior (Oxford University Press, USA, 1982), ISBN 978-0-19-866120-7
- Quantitative ethology: The state space approach (Boston: Pitman, 1981), ISBN 0-273-08417-8
- Feedback Mechanisms in Animal Behaviour (London: Academic Press, 1971), ISBN 978-0-12-483850-5
