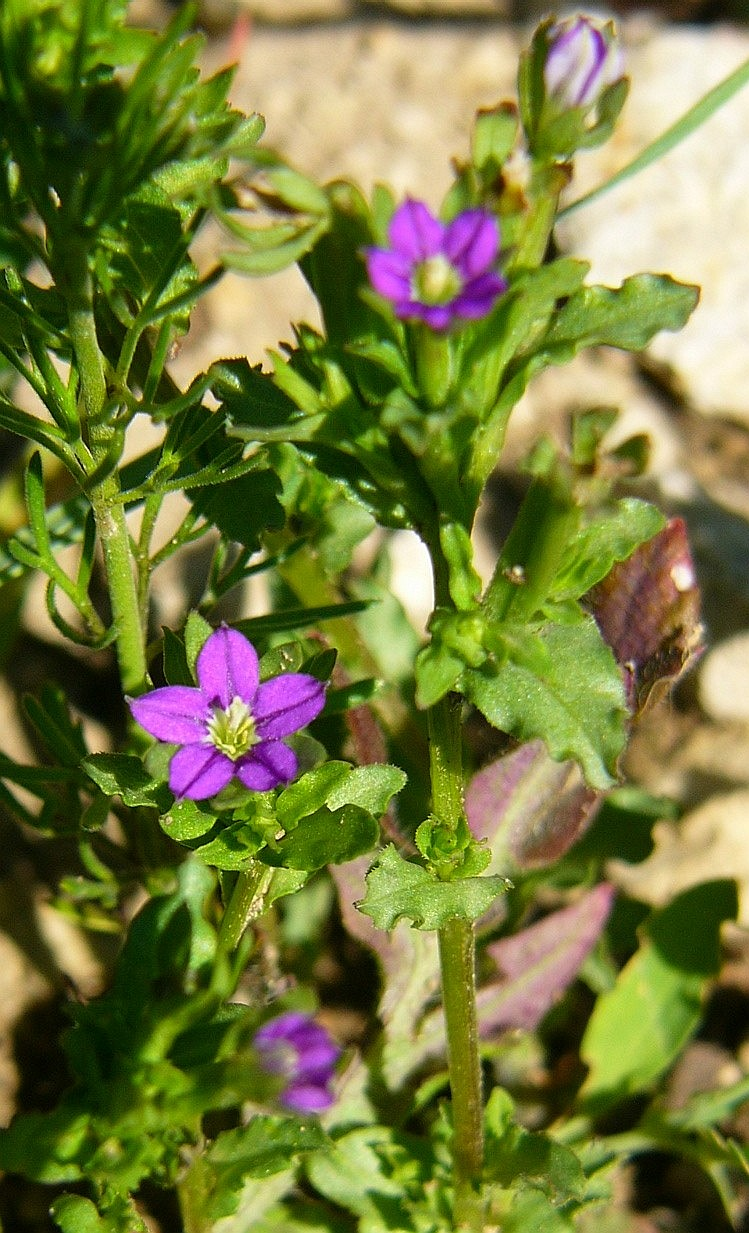

Scientific classification
- Kingdom: Plantae
- Clade: Tracheophytes
- Clade: Angiosperms
- Clade: Eudicots
- Clade: Asterids
- Order: Asterales
- Family: Campanulaceae
- Genus: Legousia
- Species: L. hybrida

Binomial name
- Legousia hybrida (L.) Delarbre

= Legousia hybrida =

Species of plant

Legousia hybrida is a species of annual herb in the family Campanulaceae (bellflowers). They have a self-supporting growth form. They have simple, broad leaves. Individuals can grow to 93 cm (37 in) tall.

== Sources ==
This article incorporates text from a free content work. Licensed under CC0 (license statement/permission). Text taken from Legousia hybrida. Encyclopedia of Life.
