= James Meek (writer) =

British novelist and journalist (born 1962)

- Born: c.1962 London
- Education: Grove Academy
- Alma mater: University of Edinburgh
- Occupations: Journalist, novelist

James Meek (born 1962) is a British journalist and novelist, author of The People's Act of Love. He was born in London, England, and grew up in Dundee, Scotland.

== Biography ==
Meek attended school at Grove Academy in Broughty Ferry, Dundee, and studied at Edinburgh University. His first short stories were published in the New Edinburgh Review and he collaborated with Duncan McLean on a play, Faculty of Rats, which starred Angus Macfadyen.

After a few years in England Meek returned to Edinburgh in 1988, where he worked for The Scotsman. The following year, his first novel, McFarlane Boils the Sea, was published. In 1990 he helped McLean set up the garage publishing house Clocktower Press.

In 1991, Meek moved to Kyiv, and in 1994 to Moscow. He joined the staff of The Guardian, becoming its Moscow bureau chief. In 1999, he moved to London. He left the Guardian in 2005. He is the author of five novels, two books of short stories and a book of essays about privatisation. He is a contributing editor to the London Review of Books.

== Fiction ==
In the 1990s and early 2000s, Meek was associated with the emerging experimental realist school of Scottish writers, including Irvine Welsh and Alan Warner, appearing with them on the pages of the Kevin Williamson-edited short story collection Children of Albion Rovers. His fiction during this time – two novels and two books of short stories – was characterised by surrealism and absurdism and influenced by writers such as Franz Kafka and James Kelman. Meek has described it as "magical dirty realism".

Meek’s third novel, The People’s Act of Love, published in 2005, brought him critical acclaim and a wider audience. It was translated into more than twenty languages and earned a number of awards and a nomination for the Booker Prize. Newsweek magazine named it one of the top ten works of fiction of the 2000s. Johnny Depp optioned the book for a film adaptation.

The People's Act of Love, about a woman and her three lovers in a small Siberian town during the Russian Civil War, was followed by We Are Now Beginning Our Descent (2008), the story of a journalist who travels to Afghanistan immediately after 9/11, and The Heart Broke In (2012), set in contemporary Britain, where a newspaper editor blackmails a TV producer into betraying his sister.

== Journalism ==
Besides reporting on Britain and the former Soviet Union, Meek covered the military conflicts in Afghanistan and Iraq after 9/11. In 2003 he crossed the border from Kuwait into Iraq, following the invading American armies to Baghdad in a small group of journalists that included Dexter Filkins.

In 2014 Meek published Private Island, a collection of essays, mainly from the London Review of Books, about the privatisation of Britain.

== Awards and honours ==
Meek was elected a Fellow of the Royal Society of Literature in 2020.

=== Fiction ===
- 2005: Scottish Arts Council Book of Year Award, The People's Act of Love
- 2005: Ondaatje Prize, The People’s Act of Love
- 2005: Booker Prize, long list, The People's Act of Love
- 2008: Le Prince Maurice Prize, We Are Now Beginning Our Descent
- 2012: Costa Book Award, shortlist, The Heart Broke In

=== Non-fiction ===
- 2002: Reuters-IUCN Media Award
- 2003: British Press Awards Foreign Reporter of the Year
- 2004: Amnesty International Journalist of the Year
- 2015: Orwell Book Prize

== Bibliography ==
- McFarlane Boils the Sea (Polygon, 1989), ISBN 0-7486-6006-2
- Last Orders and Other Stories (Polygon, 1992), ISBN 0-7486-6127-1
- Drivetime (Polygon, 1995), ISBN 0-7486-6205-7
- The Museum of Doubt (Rebel Inc, 2000), ISBN 1-84195-808-5
- The People's Act of Love (Canongate, 2005), ISBN 1-84195-706-2
- We Are Now Beginning Our Descent (Canongate, 2008), ISBN 1-84195-988-X
- The Heart Broke In (Canongate, 2012) ISBN 9780857862907
- Private Island. Why Britain Now Belongs to Someone Else (Verso, 2014), ISBN 978-1781682906
- Dreams of Leaving and Remaining (Verso, 2019), ISBN 9781788735230
- To Calais, In Ordinary Time (Canongate, 2019), ISBN 9781786896742
