= Dorling Kindersley =

British publisher of non-fiction books

- Parent company: Penguin Random House
- Founded: 1974; 52 years ago London, England, United Kingdom
- Founders: Christopher Dorling; Peter Kindersley
- Country of origin: United Kingdom
- Headquarters location: 80 Strand; London, England, UK
- Imprints: Alpha, DK Eyewitness Travel, DK Children's, DK Adult, DK Licensing, DK Learning, Phonic Books, Rebel Girls
- No. of employees: 750
- Official website: www.dk.com

Dorling Kindersley Limited (branded as DK) is a British multinational publishing company specializing in illustrated reference books for adults and children in 63 languages. It is part of Penguin Random House, a subsidiary of German media conglomerate Bertelsmann. Established in 1974, DK publishes a range of titles in genres including travel (including DK Eyewitness Travel), history, geography, science, space, nature, sports, gardening, cookery, parenting and many others. DK has offices in New York, Melbourne, London, Munich, New Delhi, Toronto, Madrid, Beijing, and Jiangmen. DK works with licensing partners such as Disney, LEGO, DC Comics, the Royal Horticultural Society, MasterChef, and the Smithsonian Institution. DK has commissioned authors such as Mary Berry, Monty Don, Robert Winston, Huw Richards, and Steve Mould for a range of books.

== History ==
Logo (2014–2020)

DK was founded in 1974 by Christopher Dorling and Peter Kindersley in London as a book packager. Its first book as a publisher in the UK was First Aid Manual for the British voluntary medical services. In 1988, DK Inc. published the first Eyewitness book; in the same year, the Alfred A. Knopf division of Random House started publishing Dorling Kindersley books in the United States. In 1991, DK began to self-publish its books in the U.S. and Microsoft bought a 26 percent stake in the company. In 1996, DK hired Neal Porter, Richard Jackson and Melanie Kroupa from Orchard Books to start the DK Ink imprint, but Grolier sued the trio. DK and Grolier settled the lawsuit.

In 1999, DK overestimated the market for Star Wars books and was left with millions of unsold copies, resulting in crippling debt. As a direct result, DK was taken over the following year by the Pearson plc media company and made part of Penguin Group, which also owned the Penguin Books label. DK has continued to sell Star Wars books after the takeover.

In 2013, Bertelsmann and Pearson completed a merger to form Penguin Random House. Bertelsmann owned 53% and Pearson 47% of the company. Penguin's trade publishing activity continued to include DK under the newly formed Penguin Random House. In July 2017, Pearson agreed to sell a 22% stake in the business to Bertelsmann, thereby retaining a 25% holding. In December 2019, Bertelsmann agreed to acquire Pearson's 25% in Penguin Random House, and therefore DK, making it a wholly owned subsidiary of Bertelsmann. In 2019, Prima Games was sold to Asteri Holdings.

== Publications ==
DK publishes a range of titles internationally for adults and children. Most of the company's books are published with "DK" named as the author, as they are produced by teams of editors, designers and cartographers who work with freelance writers and illustrators. Some are endorsed by "imprimaturs": such as the British Medical Association, the Royal Horticultural Society and the British Red Cross.

=== BradyGames ===
BradyGames was a publishing company in the United States operating as a DK imprint, which specializes in video game strategy guides, covering multiple video game platforms. It published its first strategy guide in November 1993 as a division of MacMillan Computer Publishing. In 1998, Simon & Schuster (which acquired Macmillan in 1994) divested BradyGames as part of its educational division to Pearson plc. BradyGames has grown to publish roughly 90 to 100 guides per year.

On 1 June 2015, BradyGames merged with Prima Games, and future strategy guides made by the publishing company were published under the Prima Games label, which was sold to Asteri Holdings in 2019.

=== Young adult ===
DK commenced publishing books aimed at teens with the release of Heads Up Psychology in 2014.

== See also ==
- Cartopedia
