= Leighton Park School =

Coordinates: 51°26′15″N 0°56′51″W

Leighton Park School/Reading

Location
- Shinfield Road; Reading, Berkshire, RG2 7ED; England

Information
- Type: Private school Public school Day and boarding school
- Religious affiliations: Religious Society of Friends (Quaker)
- Established: 1890
- Head: Luke Walters
- Staff: ~213
- Gender: Co-educational
- Age: 11 to 18
- Enrolment: ~597
- Colours: Blue, Copper, White
- Publication: The Park
- Campus: 65-acre (260,000 m^{2}) parkland campus
- Former Pupils: Old Leightonians
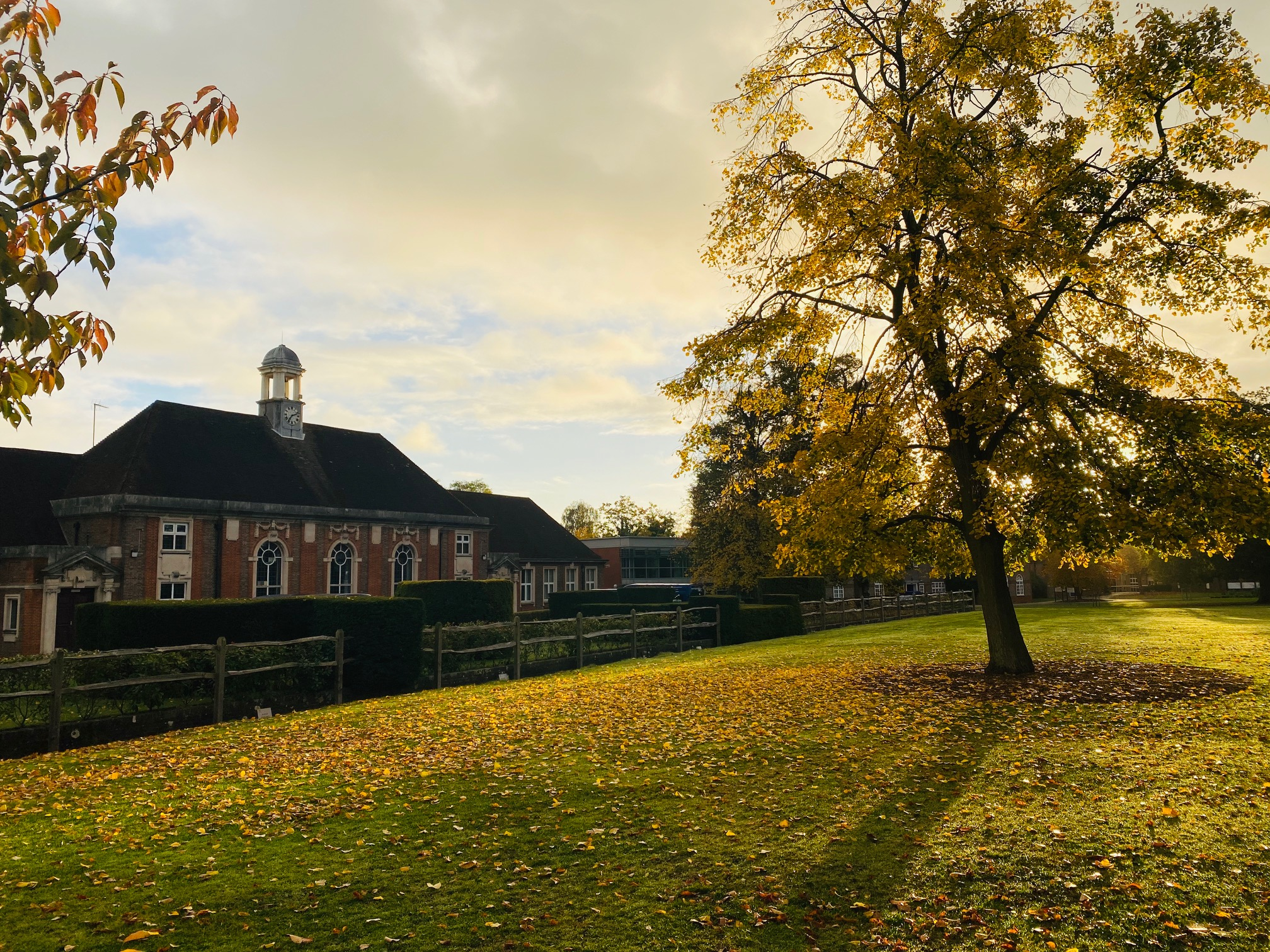
- Website: leightonpark.com Peckover Hall

Leighton Park School is a co-educational private school for day and boarding pupils in Reading in South East England. Founded in 1890 as a Quaker school, its ethos remains closely aligned with Quaker values. The school describes its core values as “The Stripes”, defined as simplicity, truth, respect, integrity, peace, equality and sustainability. It is one of the 10 Quaker schools in the UK.

== Overview ==
The school is based in a 65-acre (26 ha) parkland estate just south of Reading town centre, next to the University of Reading's Whiteknights Park campus. The school has been a member of the Headmasters' and Headmistresses' Conference since 1932. It offers both the International Baccalaureate and A Levels at Sixth Form.

The school won Senior School of the Year in the Independent Schools Association (ISA) Awards 2023, the largest independent schools’ body in the UK. This success came on the back of Leighton Park also being acknowledged as one of the country’s best independent schools in the prestigious TES Schools Awards 2023

Luke Walters has been the headmaster since September 2025.

Old School and the attached teaching accommodation at Leighton Park are Grade II listed buildings. Grove House was designed by the Victorian architect Alfred Waterhouse, who also designed the Natural History Museum in London and was himself an old boy of Grove House School.

Leighton Park is a Quaker School, and takes part in meeting for worship amongst other events.

== History ==
Leighton Park was opened in 1890 by members of the Religious Society of Friends (Quakers), as a public school for boys. It was founded after Grove House School, also a Quaker school, closed in 1877. Grove House School had educated notable personalities such as Lord Lister, Alfred Waterhouse and Thomas Hodgkin.

Leighton Park grew from four boys in 1890 to 103 in the 1920s. The junior school became the independent Crosfields School, making Leighton Park solely a senior school. By 1970 the school had 300 pupils, and in 1975 girls were admitted to the sixth form. In 1993 the school became fully coeducational. Today the school is home to around 597 pupils, drawn from more than 45 different countries.

In 2015, the school celebrated its 125-year anniversary.

Several of the school’s buildings have also marked significant milestones over the years, including Fryer, the centre for pupils in Years 7 and 8, which celebrated its 100th birthday.

In March 2016, the school was granted planning permission to redevelop the main hall and music department into the Music and Media Centre (MMC). The new facility officially opened in March 2019.

In October 2024, the historic Grove House was redeveloped and officially opened as the School’s new Sixth Form Study Centre and whole-school Library. The renovation converted the former boarding house into modern study spaces, a lecture theatre, sixth-form common room, classrooms, silent-study areas, and social spaces — and the Grove building is now fully in use as part of the school’s facilities.

== Press ==
Leighton Park appeared on the BBC One Show in 2020, featuring the school's production of PPE for health workers during the Covid-19 pandemic Leighton Park was featured on the BBC Politics Show, which was hosted at the site in December 2010.

In April 2005, Quaker-based Sunday Worship was broadcast live from Leighton Park on BBC Radio 4. Heard by an estimated 1.75 million listeners, the sequence of readings, music, ministry and silence "reflected the essence of Quaker values to the wider world."

In November 2011 thieves stole Maverick the Harris hawk from a teacher's aviary. Maverick was used "to build a more adventurous curriculum for pupils" and helped students learn physics. Pupils were left distraught after the theft as a core team of pupils had been trained to handle him.

== Former pupils ==
Notable old pupils include:

- Sir John Adye, former Director of the GCHQ
- Crispin Aubrey, civil rights campaigner
- Sir Tony Baldry, former MP
- Julian Bell, Bloomsbury member, son of Vanessa Bell and Clive Bell, poet
- Quentin Bell, Bloomsbury member, son of Vanessa Bell and Clive Bell, artist and writer
- Eliza Bennett, actress - Nanny McPhee
- Sir Richard Rodney Bennett, composer and jazz pianist
- Shyam Bhatia, writer and journalist
- Michael Binyon, Times leader journalist
- Sir John Birch, former ambassador to Hungary
- Derek Brewer, Secretary and Chief Executive of Marylebone Cricket Club
- Jim Broadbent, Oscar-winning actor - Hot Fuzz, Harry Potter and the Half-Blood Prince, Paddington
- Basil Bunting, poet
- Sir Egbert Cadbury, Managing Director of Fry's and Cadbury's and decorated First World War ace
- Kristian Callaghan, British pistol shooter, winner of Bronze Medal 2014 Commonwealth Games
- Professor Edward Chaney, cultural historian
- Lance Clark, former CEO of Clark's Shoes and founder of Soul of Africa charity
- Nathan Crowley, Oscar-winning production designer - Interstellar, Dunkirk, First Man, Wicked
- Baron Davies of Stamford, former MP, Government Minister and Life Peer
- Leonard Doncaster, Geneticist
- Christopher Dorling, co-founder of Dorling Kindersley Publishing
- Phil Dunster, Emmy-nominated actor - Ted Lasso
- Jason Durr, actor - Casualty, Heartbeat
- Owen Edwards, pioneer of Welsh TV broadcasting
- Hugh Foot, Baron Caradon, former Ambassador to United Nations
- Michael Foot, former Labour Party leader
- Jordan Luke Gage, actor, singer, playwright, and composer
- Robert Gillmor, artist and ornithologist
- Martin Griffiths, former Under-Secretary-General at the United Nations
- Hugh Haughton, Professor at York University
- Tim Ingold, anthropologist and Professor at Aberdeen University
- Sir David Lean, Oscar-winning director - The Bridge on the River Kwai, Lawrence of Arabia, Doctor Zhivago
- Po Shun Leong, artist
- Paddy Benson, Archdeacon of Hereford
- Peter Litten, film director
- Tom Lowenstein, poet
- Professor Grigor McClelland, businessman, founder of the Manchester Business School and social activist
- David McFarland, Fellow Balliol College, Professor of animal behaviour, Oxford University
- Laura Marling, Multi award-winning singer songwriter
- Tom Maschler, Publisher, former chairman of Cape, co-founder of The Booker Prize; founder of The Book Bus
- Peter May, cricketer, captain of England, and later Chairman of the England cricket selectors
- Jagat Singh Mehta, Foreign Secretary India, 1970s
- John Mitchell, Musician and music producer
- Nicholas Moore, poet and son of GE Moore, Cambridge Philosopher
- Prof. Peter Nienow, Edinburgh University, winner of the Polar Medal 2017, recognition for his pioneering glaciological work in the Arctic.
- Nathaniel Parker, Olivier Award-winning actor
- Patrick Parrinder, Professor of English, Reading University
- Lionel Penrose, Psychiatrist, medical geneticist, paediatrician, mathematician and chess theorist, Galton Professor of eugenics at University College London
- Sir Roland Penrose, artist, historian and co-founder of Institute of Contemporary Arts
- Henry Priestman, Singer/songwriter with The Christians
- John Prizeman, Architect and author on modern design
- Prof. Dan Reinstein, Leading eye surgeon and jazz musician
- Karel Reisz, Oscar-winning film director
- Prof. Julian Stallabrass, Art historian, photographer and lecturer, Courtauld Institute
- Ian Stillman, Missionary
- Richard Vernon, Actor
- Richard G. Wilkinson, Social epidemiologist, author and advocate
- Timothy Williamson, Former Wykeham Professor of Logic, Oxford University
- Stuart Zender, Musician and former founder member of Jamiroquai

== Arms ==
Coat of arms of Leighton Park School
Notes Granted in 1926 Escutcheon Sable six oak leaves three two and one Or.

== See also ==
- List of Friends Schools
- Headmasters' and Headmistresses' Conference
- Old Leightonians Cricket Club
