= David Beresford (journalist) =

South African journalist (1947–2016)

- Born: David Ross St John Beresford; 1 July 1947; Johannesburg, South Africa
- Died: 22 April 2016 (aged 68); Johannesburg, South Africa
- Education: Falcon College; University of Cape Town
- Occupation: Journalist
- Notable work: Ten Men Dead: The Story of the 1981 Irish Hunger Strike (1987)
- Spouse: Marianne Morrell (m. 1968–2016)
- Partner: Ellen Elmendorp
- Children: 3

David Ross St John Beresford (1 July 1947 – 22 April 2016) was a South African journalist who was a long-time correspondent for The Guardian newspaper. Posted to Belfast at the height of the Troubles, he was the author of Ten Men Dead (1987), a book about the 1981 Irish hunger strike in Maze prison in Northern Ireland, which has been called one of the best books ever written about the Troubles. He was later The Guardian's correspondent in Johannesburg, where he became noted for his coverage of the end of apartheid, breaking the news of some of the most significant events and scandals in the 1980s and '90s. Beresford was among the most prominent figures in South African journalism, and played a significant role in rescuing The Mail & Guardian in the early '90s.

Beresford also covered the events of the 1990 Gulf War and Rwandan genocide. Diagnosed with Parkinson's disease in 1991, Beresford continued to work as long as he could. He also documented his struggle with the disease, which claimed his life in 2016.

== Early life and education ==
Beresford was born in Johannesburg, South Africa, the youngest of three sons of St John Beresford, a banker, and Faith Beresford (née Ashby). When he was 7, his family moved to Salisbury, Rhodesia (now Harare, Zimbabwe). He was educated at Falcon College, a boarding school in Matabeleland. When David was 14 years old, his elder brother Norman died. He found an escape from his grief by going to libraries and reading.

He attended the University of Cape Town, studying English and law, but left before the end of his second year. In 1968, he married Marianne Morrell, whom he met at university.

== Career ==
After leaving university, Beresford had a brief stint working in the office of a credit agency before leaving to be a journalist. He began his career at the Salisbury Herald before joining the Cape Herald, the latter then a "coloured" newspaper. It was at the Cape Herald that he "developed the cheeky tabloid instincts that often lurked beneath his more serious journalism".

Dreaming of working on Fleet Street, he moved to the United Kingdom in 1974 with his wife, leaving their young child with her mother. Working on a three-month visa, he worked as a cub reporter for the South Wales Echo and The Argus in Sussex. He started up a "long process of pestering The Guardian editor for a job" and moved to London to work for the South African Morning Group bureau. After many more letters, he finally secured a job with The Guardian, for which he wrote the rest of his life.

=== Northern Ireland ===
In 1978, at the height of The Troubles, The Guardian sent Beresford to Northern Ireland, where he took up residence in one of the most dangerous areas of Belfast. There he covered the bombings and assassinations carried out by paramilitary organisations, as well as the Thatcher government's response, including the ongoing internment at Maze prison. He was most noted for his coverage of the 1981 Irish hunger strike and was hailed for his 1987 book about the event, Ten Men Dead, which has been called the "definitive account" of the events that led to the deaths of 10 Republicans in prison. Sinn Féin leader Gerry Adams called it "probably the best book written about that period", a sentiment echoed by British newspaper The Observer (at the time not associated with The Guardian), which called it "possibly the best book to emerge from the past 20 years of conflict in Northern Ireland".

=== Return to South Africa ===
Beresford returned to South Africa in 1984, where he continued to report for The Guardian on the final years of the brutal apartheid system. The British Press Awards named him International Reporter of the Year for 1985. Peter Preston, his editor at The Guardian, wrote of Beresford, "He was swiftly the finest chronicler of apartheid's disintegration, a correspondent who caught the excitement of a momentous story but always paused to analyse how and why the plates of repression were shrinking."

Beresford undercovered major stories, including the death-row confessions of Butana Almond Nofomela about the police squads that murdered anti-apartheid activists, and Winnie Mandela's role in the abduction and murder of teenager Stompie Moeketsi.

Beresford was among a trio of journalists who brought about the "Inkathagate" scandal in 1991 at the height of the war between the Inkatha Freedom Party (IFP) and African National Congress (ANC). Beresford helped expose that the state security police had been secretly funneling money to IFP president Mangosuthu Buthelezi. Their reports led to the resignation of two key apartheid figures, Louis le Grange, the Speaker of the National Assembly of South Africa, and Adriaan Vlok, the Minister of Law and Order, and "forever tainted" Buthelezi.

After reporting on the Gulf War, Beresford played a pivotal role in rescuing the failing Weekly Mail, which was purchased by The Guardian and renamed the Mail & Guardian.

==== 'Richard-Richard' Goldstone controversy ====
In 1994, Beresford wrote in The Guardian that Justice Richard Goldstone ran a "much vaunted" judicial commission of inquiry that "failed dismally", and that was a "rubbish bin" used by the South African government. He discussed Goldstone’s "disturbing" practice by which he acted with "overt political 'sensitivity'", including his being "at pains to involve the politically distinguished in the conduct of his inquiry"; and of harboring such ambition to succeed Boutros Boutros-Ghali’s post as UN Secretary-General, that Goldstone’s legal colleagues gave him the nickname of "Richard-Richard".

In a 1999 interview, in which he responded to former South African President F. W. de Klerk's reference to the "Richard-Richard" nickname, Goldstone claimed that it was all a figment of the journalist’s imagination, concocted for a satiric piece and then later included in The Guardian:

It's quite amusing, the 'Richard Richard' story was an invention of the chap from The Mail & Guardian, David Beresford. He concocted that as a sort of humorous thing in one of his satirical columns. As far as I'm aware that’s where it began and ended and it had a funny sequel because soon after it was printed he called me about something to do with the commission and I returned his call and he wasn’t there and I left a message to say, "Please tell him that Richard Richard called." He so enjoyed that he referred to it in an article which appeared in The Guardian.

However, an examination of Beresford's original 9 July 1994 article in The Guardian reveals that Beresford’s original reference to the nickname was not a satiric piece.

== Health and death ==
In 1991, Beresford was diagnosed with Parkinson's disease, but continued to work as long as he could. In 2001, he underwent neurological surgery to add a pacemaker (known as deep brain stimulation or DBS), to treat his Parkinson's, a procedure he wrote about. He died in Johannesburg in 2016.

== Awards ==
- British Press Awards 1985: International Reporter of the Year
- British Press Awards 1990: Foreign Correspondent of the Year

== Bibliography ==
- Ten Men Dead: The Story of the 1981 Irish Hunger Strike. HarperCollins. 1987. ISBN 0-87113-702-X.
- The Dear Walter Papers: the Sensational Correspondence Exposing the Secrets of the World's Youngest Democracy. Braamfontein: Mail & Guardian. 1997. ISBN 9780620211635.
- Truth Is a Strange Fruit: A Personal Journey Through the Apartheid War. Jacana. 2010. ISBN 978-1-77009-902-9.

== See also ==
- Irish hunger strike
