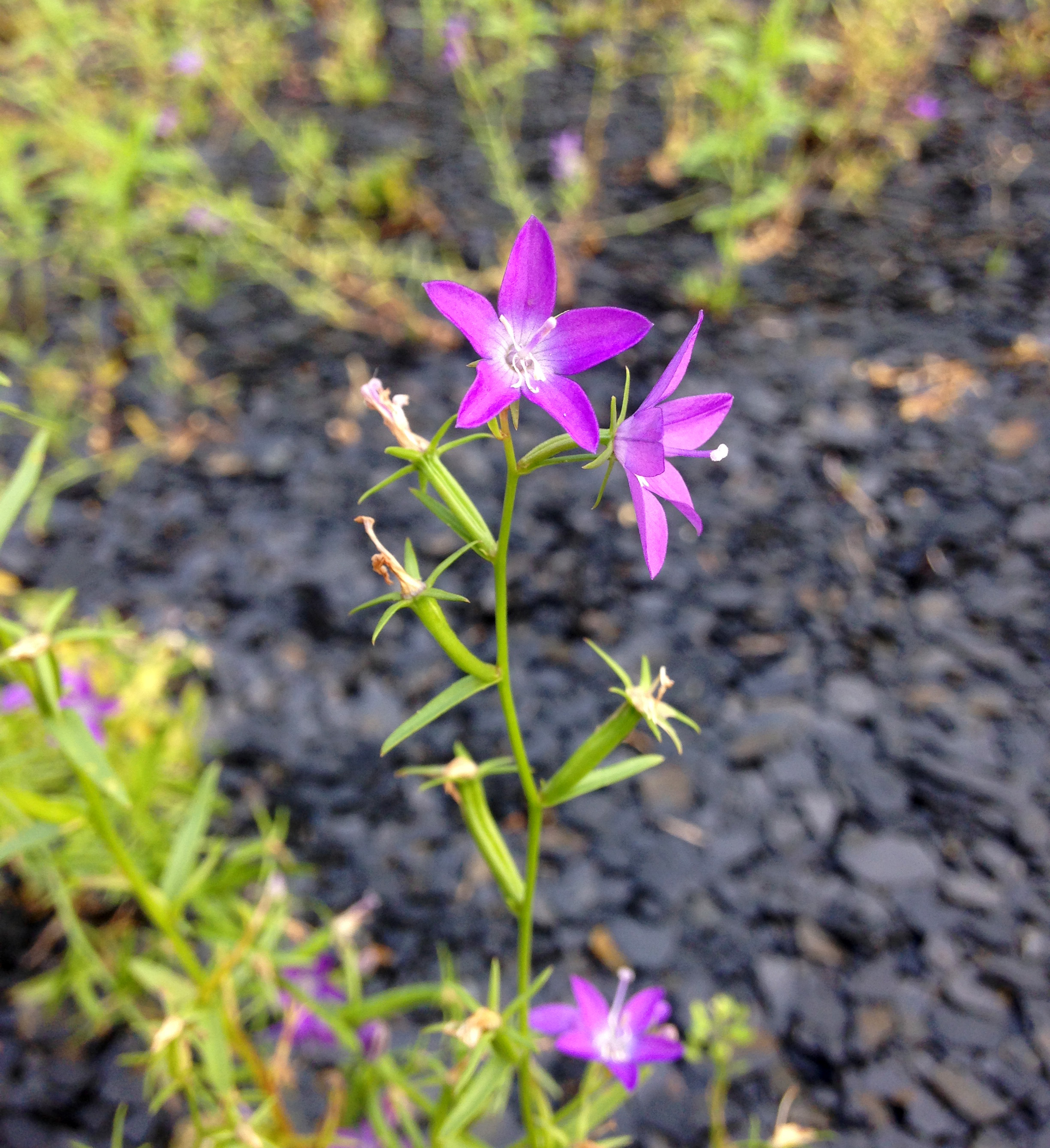

Conservation status
- Secure (NatureServe)

Scientific classification
- Kingdom: Plantae
- Clade: Tracheophytes
- Clade: Angiosperms
- Clade: Eudicots
- Clade: Asterids
- Order: Asterales
- Family: Campanulaceae
- Genus: Triodanis
- Species: T. leptocarpa

Binomial name
- Triodanis leptocarpa (Nutt.) Nieuwl.

= Triodanis leptocarpa =

Species of flowering plant

Triodanis leptocarpa, commonly called slimpod Venus' looking-glass, is a species of flowering plant in the bellflower family (Campanulaceae). It is native to the United States, where it is found primarily in the Great Plains and Midwest. Its natural habitat is in dry upland prairies and open rock outcrops. It is tolerant of disturbance and can be found in pastures and roadsides.

Triodanis leptocarpa is an herbaceous annual. It can be distinguished from other members of the genus Triodanis by its long, narrow leaves and fruits with a single locule. In addition, the fruits from cleistogamous flowers twist and arch away from the stem. It blooms from May to August.
