= Michael Binyon =

English journalist

Michael Roger Binyon OBE
- Born: 1944 (age 81–82)
- Education: Cambridge University (B.A., 1967)
- Occupation: Leader writer for The Times

Michael Roger Binyon OBE (born November 1944) is an English journalist known as a foreign correspondent. He has been Moscow Correspondent for The Times, and has reported from Bonn, Washington and the Middle East. He is a leader writer for The Times and occasional arts and books critic.

== Education ==
After Leighton Park School, Binyon matriculated at Magdalene College, Cambridge, in 1963, where he was a direct contemporary of BBC foreign correspondent John Simpson, both reading English. Binyon later switched to Arabic, graduating in 1967.

== Career ==
After teaching English in Minsk for a year, Binyon began his career at the BBC Arabic Service and the Times Educational Supplement. He reported from Moscow in the 1970s, and went on to cover the fall of the Berlin Wall, and Middle East conflicts. Other positions he has held at The Times include: diplomatic editor, Washington bureau chief and Brussels correspondent, where his opposite number at The Daily Telegraph was Boris Johnson.

== Awards and honours ==
- Binyon was awarded the OBE in 2000 for services to international journalism.
- His reporting from Moscow garnered two British Press Awards in 1979 and 1980.
- From 2008 to 2009, he was master of the British Leathersellers' Company.
