= John Prizeman =

British architect and designer

- Born: 15 November 1930; Little Bookham, Surrey, U.K.
- Died: 11 July 1992 (aged 61); Brighton, East Sussex, U.K.
- Education: Leighton Park SchoolArchitectural Association School of Architecture
- Occupations: Architect, designer
- Spouse: Willow Bentley
- Children: 1 son, 2 daughters

John Prizeman (15 November 1930 – 11 July 1992) was a British architect and designer. He was the author of four books.

== Early life ==
John Prizeman was born on 15 November 1930 in Little Bookham, England. He was raised as a Quaker, educated at Leighton Park School and later graduated from the Architectural Association School of Architecture.

== Career ==
Prizeman began his career by working for Felix Samuely. He subsequently established his own practice as an architect and designer. He designed buildings in the United Kingdom and overseas, including "hotel villages, prefabricated houses, housing developments and conversions" as well as "a plastics factory, several restaurants" and art galleries. He also became known for designing kitchens. He donated one of his kitchen sketches to the Victoria & Albert Museum in London.

Prizeman was the author of four books.

== Personal life and death ==
Prizeman married Willow Bentley. They had a son and two daughters. He died on 11 July 1992 in Brighton.

== Works ==
- Kitchens (1966)
- European Interiors (1970)
- Living Rooms (1970)
- Your House (1975)
