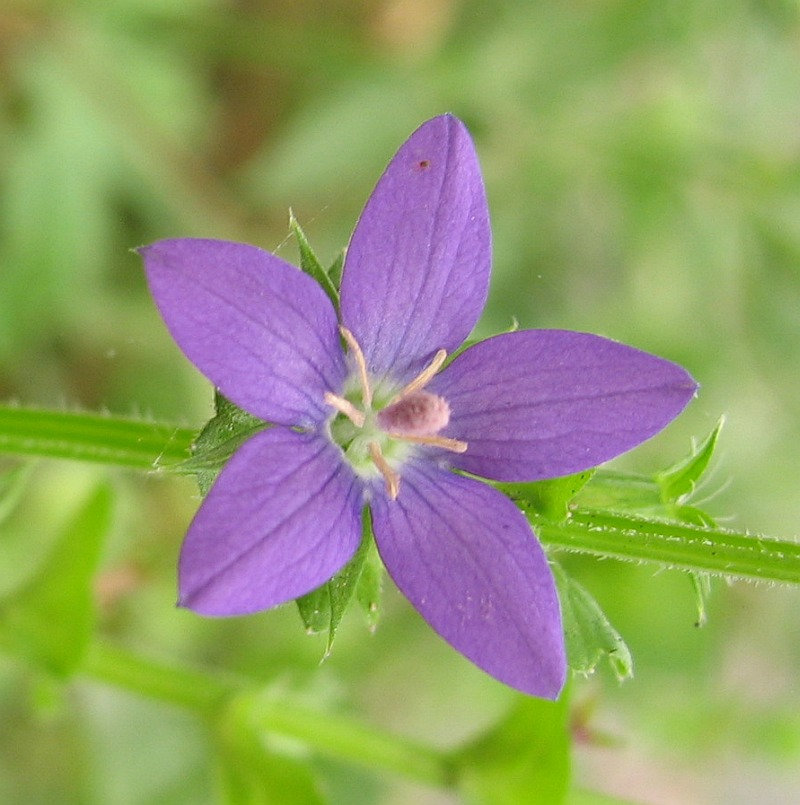

Conservation status
- Secure (NatureServe)

Scientific classification
- Kingdom: Plantae
- Clade: Tracheophytes
- Clade: Angiosperms
- Clade: Eudicots
- Clade: Asterids
- Order: Asterales
- Family: Campanulaceae
- Genus: Triodanis
- Species: T. perfoliata

Binomial name
- Triodanis perfoliata (L.) Nieuwl.

Synonyms
- Campanula perfoliata L.; Legousia perfoliata (L.) Britton; Prismatocarpus perfoliatus (L.) Sweet; Pentagonia perfoliata (L.) Kuntze; Dysmicodon perfoliatum (L.) Nutt; Specularia perfoliata (L.) A.DC.

= Triodanis perfoliata =

Species of flowering plant

Triodanis perfoliata, the clasping Venus' looking-glass or clasping bellflower, is an annual flowering plant belonging to the family Campanulaceae (bellflower family). It is an annual herb native to North and South America, the natural range extending from Canada to Argentina. It is also naturalized in China, Korea and Australia.

== Description ==
T. perfoliata is an annual plant that grows to a height of 10–46 centimetres (4–18 in), occasionally taller, with a central, unbranched, lightly hairy stem featuring alternate leaves that clasp the stem. The leaves are light green, rounded, up to 2.5 centimetres (1 in) long, and are scallop-edged and shell-shaped. Both the stem and the leaves contain a milky sap.

On the upper part of the stem, 1-3 flowers emerge from the leaf axils, although only 1 of these flowers will be blooming at any one time. These flowers are wheel-shaped or bell-shaped, violet blue (rarely white), and approximately 1.3 centimetres (.5 in) across. They have 5-lobed corollas and are radially symmetrical. There are flowers on the lower part of the stem but they do not open, although they do produce seed. The plant produces a small, many seeded capsule with 2 or 3 sections for fruit.

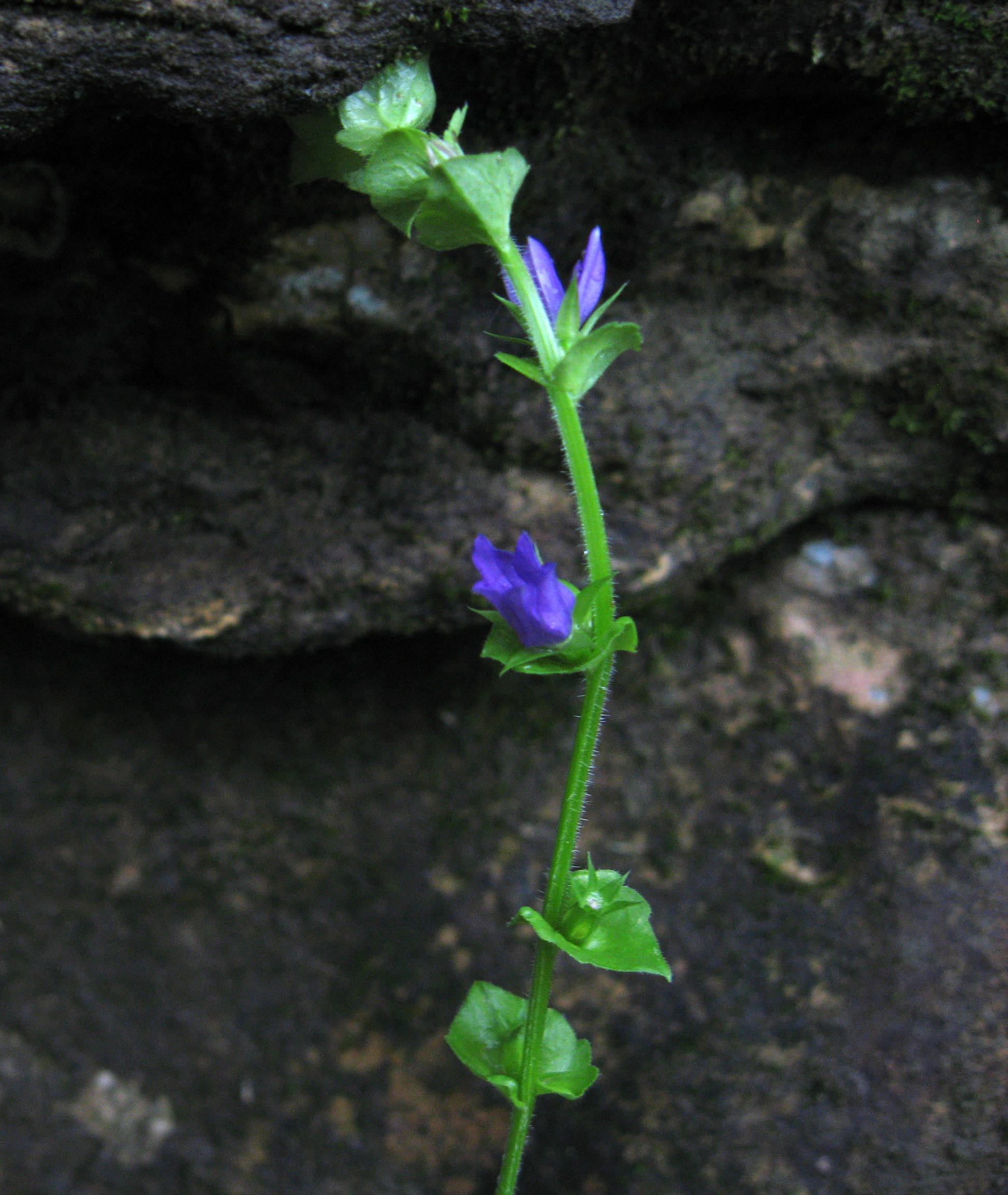
Showing cordate-clasping leaves and a maturing capsule

== Distribution and habitat ==
T. perfoliata is native in much of North and South America. In Canada, it grows in Ontario, British Columbia, and Quebec. In the United States, it is native in every state except Nevada, Alaska, and Hawaii. It is also native to Mexico, Costa Rica, Guatemala, Argentina, Bolivia, Brazil, Colombia, Ecuador, Paraguay, Peru, and Uruguay. The plant grows in disturbed sites, open woods, grassy slopes, rocky outcrops, gravelly areas, and roadsides, mainly in poor, dry, sandy, or gravelly soil.

== Ecology ==
Flowers bloom from May to August and attract a variety of bees, flies, butterflies, and moths.

Triodanis perfoliata is insect pollinated and is recorded to have been visited in northern Florida by Ceratina sp. and Colletes brevicornis. '

== Uses among Native Americans ==
The Cherokee make a liquid compound of roots infused into a bath for dyspepsia (indigestion).

The Meskwaki use it as an emetic to make one "sick all day long", and smoke it at ceremonies.
