= Christopher Dorling =

British Businessman, co-founder of Dorling kindersley

Christopher Dorling is the co-founder of Dorling Kindersley, a publishing company, along with Peter Kindersley. He was educated at Leighton Park School. He retired from the company in 1987, but remained a board member as of 1999.
