= Peter Kindersley =

British businessman (born 1941)

Peter Kindersley (born 1941) is the co-founder of the publishing company Dorling Kindersley and ran it with Christopher Dorling from 1974, until he sold his family stake for £105m in 2000. The firm's illustrated non-fiction reference books for adults and children are marketed globally and translated into other languages.

== Early life and career ==
Kindersley was the son of David Kindersley a stonecutter and typeface designer, and his first wife Christine. He attended King Edward VI School, Norwich and the Camberwell School of Arts and Crafts where he met his wife Juliet. He then worked for an advertising agency and from 1969 to 1974 as art director for the publishers Mitchell Beazley, where he designed the illustrated manual The Joy of Sex. He then co-founded Dorling Kindersley with Christopher Dorling.

== Organic-based businesses ==
Kindersley runs a 2,250 acre (911 ha) organic farm (Sheepdrove Organic Farm) in Berkshire which includes a Conference Centre. The farm produces organic free-range pigs, chickens, beef and lamb and he owns butchers shops in London and Bristol.

In 2005, the Kindersley family, with Peter at the head, bought the UK-based organic health and beauty company, Neal's Yard Remedies.
