= Derek Brewer (cricket administrator) =

British cricket administrator

- Born: Derek Michael Brewer; 1958 (age 67–68)
- Education: University of Aston
- Occupation: Businessman / CEO
- Known for: NatWest; Notts CCC; London2012; MCC

Derek Michael Brewer OBE (born 1958) was the Secretary and Chief Executive of Marylebone Cricket Club (MCC) from 2011 to 2017. Brewer was appointed chief executive at the end of 2011 following Keith Bradshaw's unexpected resignation and stepped down from the post in October 2017.

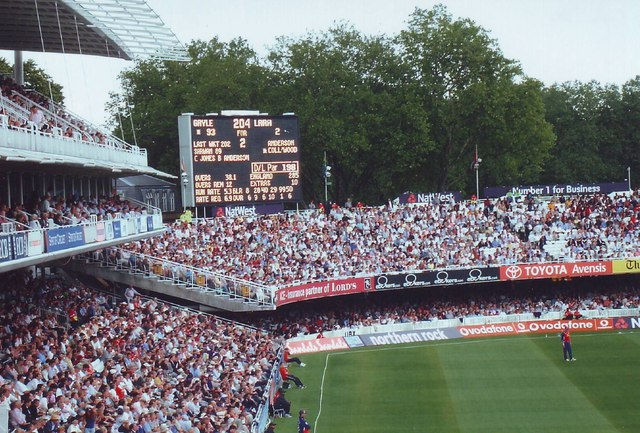
Grand and Compton stands, Lord's Cricket Ground, London

Brewer attended Leighton Park School before going up to Aston University, graduating with a BSc degree in Business Administration; he also played cricket for Warwickshire 2nd XI as a bowler. He then forged a career in banking and finance, before making his name as Chief Executive of Nottinghamshire CCC from 2005 until 2012.

As MCC's Secretary and Chief Executive since May 2012, Brewer's first task was high profile in overseeing Lord's Cricket Ground's hosting archery competitions for London2012, and then, within just two weeks, returning Lord's as a world-class cricket venue in readiness for 2012's last Test match of the season between the then top two world cricketing nations: England and South Africa.

Annually Lord's hosts the English One Day Cricket Final as well as prestigious international matches. In addition, Brewer has dealt with ongoing controversy and internal club disputes (including Sir John Major's public committee resignation) over a redevelopment plan that included construction of residential flats on some of the MCC site.

Brewer was also responsible for MCC's monitoring of the Spirit of Cricket and guardianship of the Laws of Cricket.

He was conferred an OBE in the 2026 New Year Honours list.
