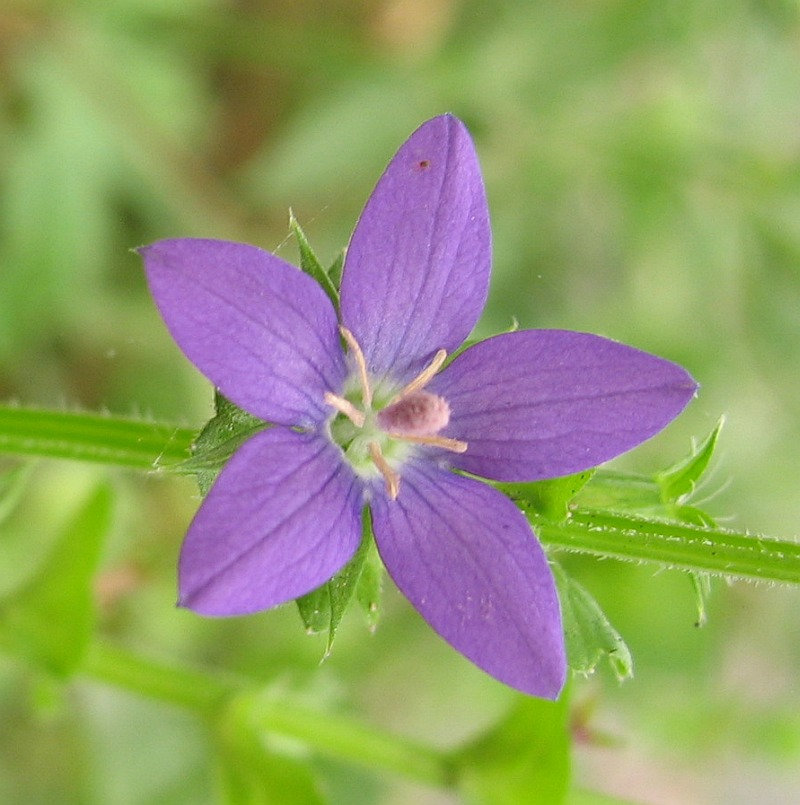
- Triodanis perfoliata

Scientific classification
- Kingdom: Plantae
- Clade: Tracheophytes
- Clade: Angiosperms
- Clade: Eudicots
- Clade: Asterids
- Order: Asterales
- Family: Campanulaceae
- Subfamily: Campanuloideae
- Genus: Triodanis; Raf. (1838)

Synonyms
- Campylocera Nutt. (1842); Dysmicodon (Endl.) Nutt. (1842)

= Triodanis =

Genus of flowering plants

Triodanis is a genus of flowering plants within the family Campanulaceae, native to North and South America. Venus' looking-glass is a common name for plants in this genus.

== Species ==
Six species are accepted.

- Triodanis coloradoensis (Buckley) McVaugh - Colorado Venus' looking-glass - endemic to Texas despite the name
- Triodanis holzingeri McVaugh - Holzinger's Venus' looking-glass - Great Plains plus Arizona and Tennessee
- Triodanis lamprosperma McVaugh - Prairie Venus' looking-glass - southern Great Plains
- Triodanis leptocarpa (Nutt.) Nieuwl. - Slimpod Venus' looking-glass - Great Plains
- Triodanis perfoliata (L.) Nieuwl. - Clasping Venus' looking-glass - widespread across North and South America from Canada to Argentina; naturalized in China, Korea, Australia
  - Triodanis perfoliata subsp. biflora (Ruiz & Pav.) Lammers (synonym Triodanis biflora (Ruiz & Pav.) Greene) - small Venus' looking-glass - United States and northern Mexico; Colombia to southern Argentina
  - Triodanis perfoliata subsp. perfoliata – Canada to Guatemala
- Triodanis texana McVaugh - Texas Venus' looking-glass - endemic to Texas
