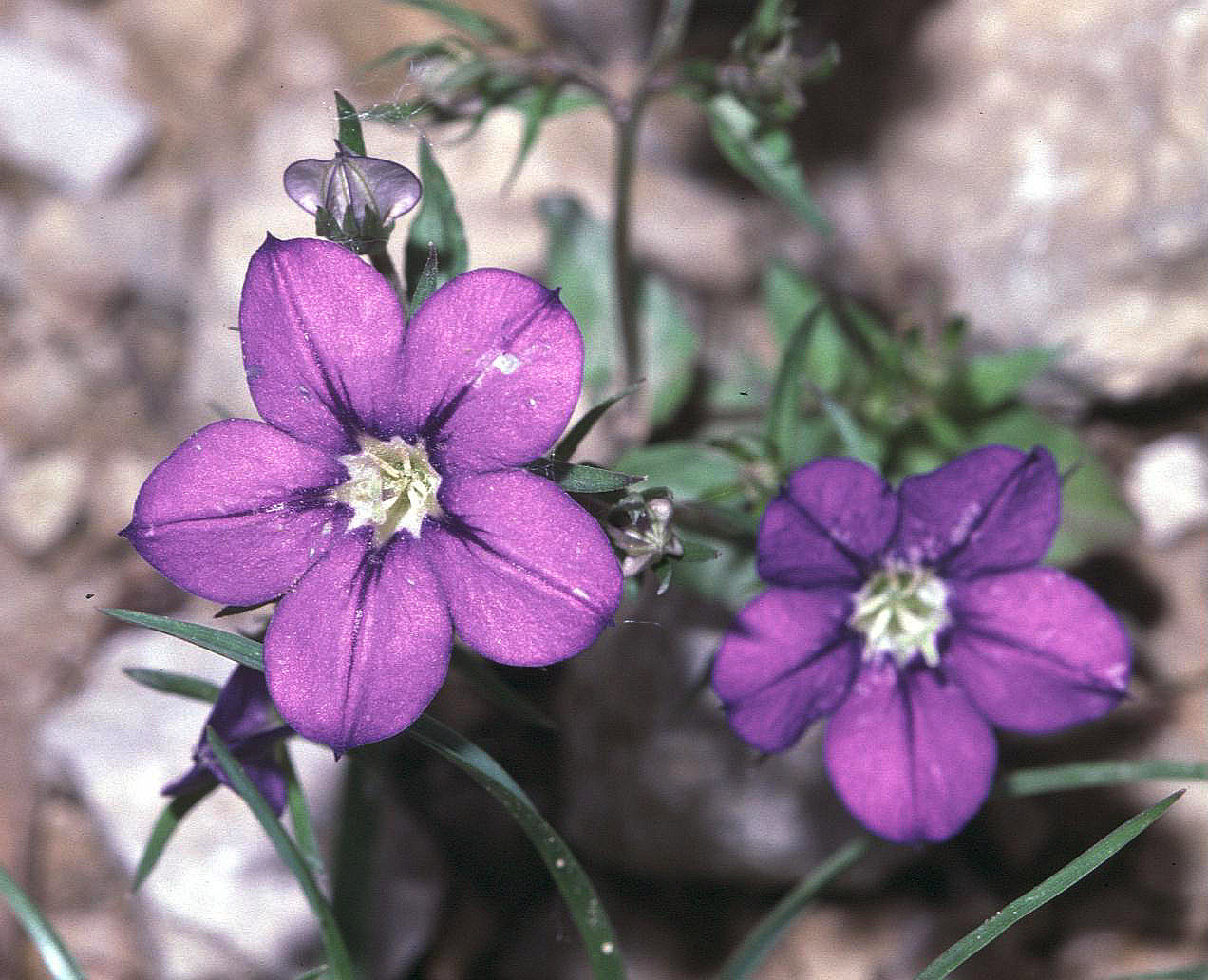

Scientific classification
- Kingdom: Plantae
- Clade: Tracheophytes
- Clade: Angiosperms
- Clade: Eudicots
- Clade: Asterids
- Order: Asterales
- Family: Campanulaceae
- Genus: Legousia
- Species: L. speculum-veneris

Binomial name
- Legousia speculum-veneris (L.) Chaix

= Legousia speculum-veneris =

Large Venus's-looking-glass

Species of flowering plant

Legousia speculum-veneris, the looking glass or large Venus's-looking-glass, is an annual ornamental plant in the family Campanulaceae (bellflowers). It blooms from June to August and is native to the Mediterranean region.

== Characteristics ==
Legousia petal bases are straight (not bell-based as Campanula).

L. speculum-veneris flowers have a 5-part calyx under the flower-base with long very narrow arms, roughly equal to the petals and to the ovary (which appears at first like a stalk to the flower and in maturing swells).

The flowers lack the broad blue central band of L. pentagonia (found from Greece eastwards), which has comparatively shortened calyx arms.

However the Eastern Mediterranean has forms transitional between L. speculum-veneris and L. pentagonia suggestive of gene flow.

== Synonyms ==
- Campanula speculum-veneris L. – Sp. Pl.: 168 (1753), basionym
- Legousia arvensis Durande – Fl. Bourgogne 1: 37 (1782), nom. superfl.
- Prismatocarpus speculum-veneris (L.) L'Hér. – Sert. Angl.: 3 (1789)
- Campanula pulchella Salisb. – Prodr. Stirp. Chap. Allerton: 127 (1796), nom. superfl.
- Legousia durandei Delarbre – Fl. Auvergne, ed. 2: 45 (1800), nom. superfl.
- Campanula arvensis Pers. – Syn. Pl. 1: 193 (1805)
- Prismatocarpus hirtus Ten. – Fl. Napol. 1(Prodr.): xvi (1811)
- Campanula hirta (Ten.) Schult. – J.J.Roemer & J.A.Schultes, Syst. Veg. 5: 153 (1819)
- Campanula cordata Vis. – Stirp. Dalmat. Spec.: 5 (1826)
- Specularia speculum A.DC. — Monogr. Campan.: 346 (1830)
- Specularia speculum-veneris (L.) A.DC. – Monogr. Campan.: 346 (1830)
- Legousia speculum Fisch. ex A.DC. – Monogr. Campan.: 347 (1830)
- Specularia speculum-veneris var. calycina A.DC. – Monogr. Campan.: 347 (1830)
- Specularia speculum-veneris var. libanotica A.DC. – Monogr. Campan.: 347 (1830)
- Specularia speculum-veneris var. pubescens A.DC. – Monogr. Campan.: 347 (1830)
- Prismatocarpus cordatus (Vis.) Rchb. – Fl. Germ. Excurs.: 858 (1831)
- Specularia cordata (Vis.) Heynh. – Nom. Bot. Hort.: 689 (1841)
- Specularia vulgaris Kitt. – Taschenb. Fl. Deutschl., ed. 2: 483 (1843), nom. superfl.
- Prismatocarpus speculum-veneris var. hirtus (Ten.) K.Koch – Linnaea 19: 30 (1846)
- Specularia speculum-veneris var. stricta Griseb. – Spic. Fl. Rumel. 2: 279 (1846)
- Specularia arvensis Montandon – F.Friche-Joset, Syn. Fl. Jura, ed. 2: 156 (1868)
- Campanula trigona Ehrenb. ex Boiss. – Fl. Orient. 3: 959 (1875)
- Specularia speculum-veneris var. racemosa Boiss. – Fl. Orient. 3: 959 (1875)
- Specularia speculum-veneris var. cordata (Vis.) Nyman – Consp. Fl. Eur.: 483 (1879)
- Specularia speculum-veneris var. hirta (Ten.) Nyman – Consp. Fl. Eur.: 483 (1879)
- Specularia speculum-veneris subsp. hirta (Ten.) Arcang. – Comp. Fl. Ital.: 450 (1882)
- Specularia speculum-veneris f. plena Voss – Vilm. Blumengärtn. ed. 3, 1: 563 (1894)
- Specularia speculum-veneris f. procumbens Voss – Vilm. Blumengärtn. ed. 3, 1: 563 (1894)
- Specularia speculum-veneris var. procumbens (Voss) auct. – Rev. Hort. 1897: 254 (1897)
- Specularia speculum-veneris subvar. pubescens (A.DC.) Rouy – G.Rouy & J.Foucaud, Fl. France 10: 57 (1908)
- Specularia polypiflora Davidov – Trav. Soc. Bulg. Sci. Nat. 8: 92 (1915)
- Specularia hirta (Ten.) Gand. – Fl. Cret.: 69 (1916)
- Legousia speculum-veneris f. calycina (A.DC.) Hayek – Repert. Spec. Nov. Regni Veg. Beih. 30(2): 551 (1930)
- Legousia speculum-veneris f. polypiflora (Davidov) Hayek – Repert. Spec. Nov. Regni Veg. Beih. 30(2): 551 (1930)
- Legousia speculum-veneris f. stricta (Griseb.) Hayek – Repert. Spec. Nov. Regni Veg. Beih. 30(2): 551 (1930)
- Githopsis latifolia Eastw. – Proc. Calif. Acad. Sci. IV, 20: 154 (1931)

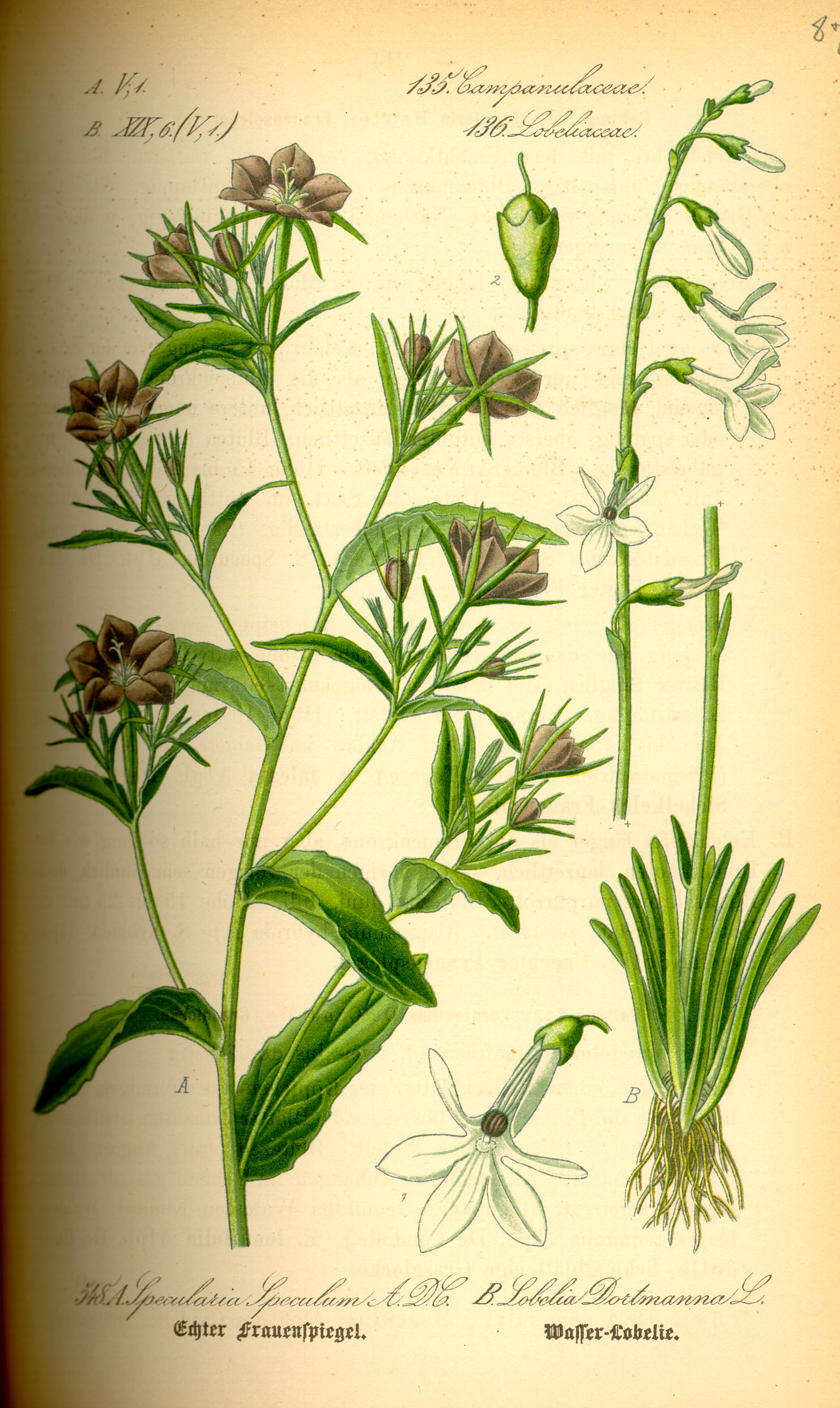
L. speculum-veneris
