= Kennington =

Area of London, mostly within the London Borough of Lambeth

Coordinates: 51.48°N 0.12°W

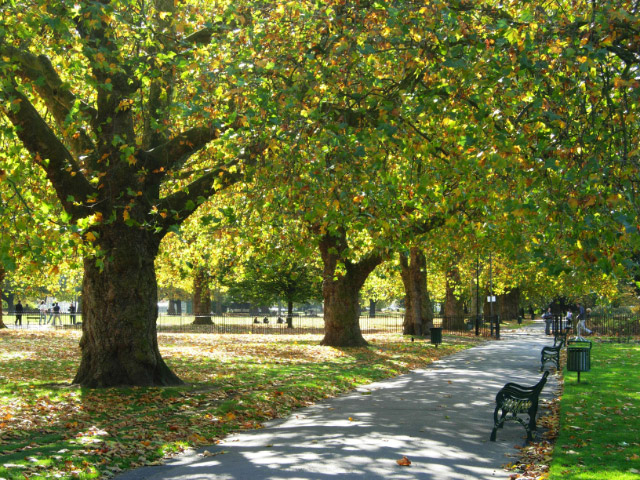
- Kennington Park

- Location within Greater London
- Population: 15,106 (Oval ward 2011 Census)
- OS grid reference: TQ305775
  - Charing Cross: 1.4 mi (2.3 km) N
- London borough: Lambeth
- Ceremonial county: Greater London
- Region: London
- Country: England
- Sovereign state: United Kingdom
- Post town: LONDON
- Postcode district: SE11
- Dialling code: 020
- Police: Metropolitan
- Fire: London
- Ambulance: London
- UK Parliament: Vauxhall and Camberwell Green
- London Assembly: Lambeth and Southwark

Kennington is a district in South London, England. It is mainly within the London Borough of Lambeth, running along the boundary with the London Borough of Southwark, a boundary which can be discerned from the early medieval period between the Lambeth and St George's parishes of those boroughs respectively. It is located 1.4 miles (2.3 km) south of Charing Cross in Inner London and is identified as a local centre in the London Plan. It was a royal manor in the parish of St Mary, Lambeth in the county of Surrey and was the administrative centre of the parish from 1853. Proximity to central London was key to the development of the area as a residential suburb and it was incorporated into the metropolitan area of London in 1855.

Kennington is the location of three significant London landmarks: the Oval cricket ground, the Imperial War Museum, and Kennington Park. Its population at the 2011 United Kingdom census was 15,106.

== History ==
=== Toponymy ===
Kennington appears in the Domesday Book of 1086 as Chenintune. It is recorded as Kenintone in 1229 and Kenyngton in 1263. Mills (2001) believes the name to be Old English meaning "farmstead or estate associated with a man called Cēna". Another explanation is that it means "place of the King", or "town of the King".

=== Early history ===
The presence of a tumulus, and other locally significant geographical features, suggest that the area was regarded in ancient times as a sacred place of assembly. According to the Domesday Book it was held by Teodric (Theodoric) the Goldsmith. It contained: 1 hide and 3 virgates; 3 ploughs, 4 acres (16,000 m^{2}) of meadow. It rendered £3 annually. The manor of Kennington was divided from the manor of Vauxhall by the River Effra, a tributary of the River Thames. A smaller river, the River Neckinger, ran along the edge of the northern part of Kennington, approximately where Brook Drive is today (i.e. the brook) still forming the borough boundary. Both rivers have now been diverted into underground culverts.

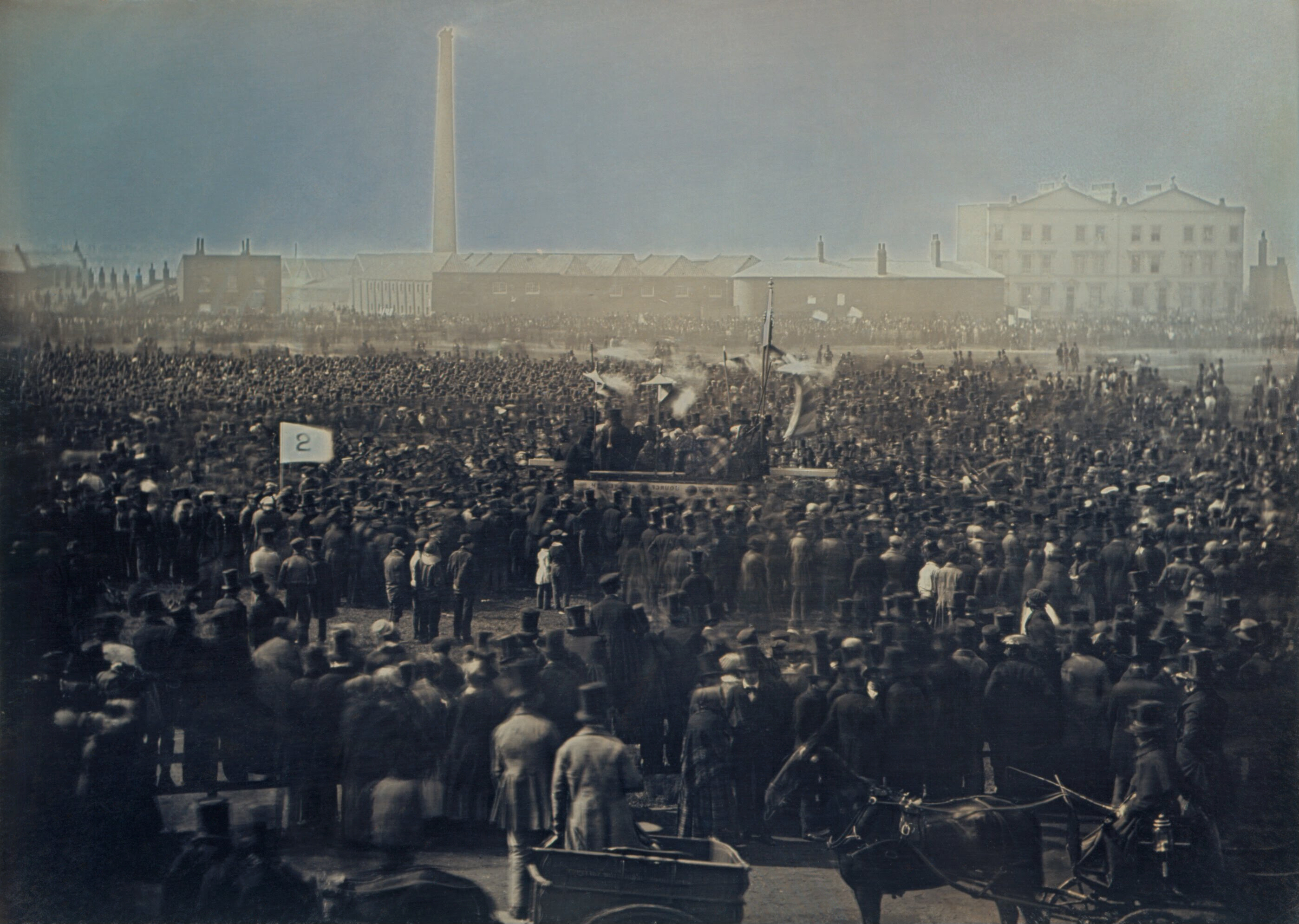
Chartist meeting on Kennington Common in 1848

Edward III gave the manor of Kennington to his oldest son Edward the Black Prince in 1337, and the prince then built a large royal palace in the triangle formed by Kennington Lane, Sancroft Street and Cardigan Street, near to Kennington Cross. In 1377, according to John Stow, John of Gaunt, 1st Duke of Lancaster came to Kennington to escape the fury of the people of London. Geoffrey Chaucer was employed at Kennington as Clerk of Works in 1389. He was paid 2 shillings. Kennington was the occasional residence of Henry IV and Henry VI. Henry VII was at Kennington before his coronation. Catherine of Aragon stayed at Kennington Palace in 1501. In 1531, at the order of King Henry VIII, most of Kennington Palace was dismantled, and the materials were used in the construction of the Palace of Whitehall.

The historical manor of Kennington continues to be owned by the current monarch's elder son (the Prince of Wales, Duke of Cornwall: see Dukes of Cornwall). The Duchy of Cornwall maintains a substantial property portfolio within the area.

=== 18th century ===
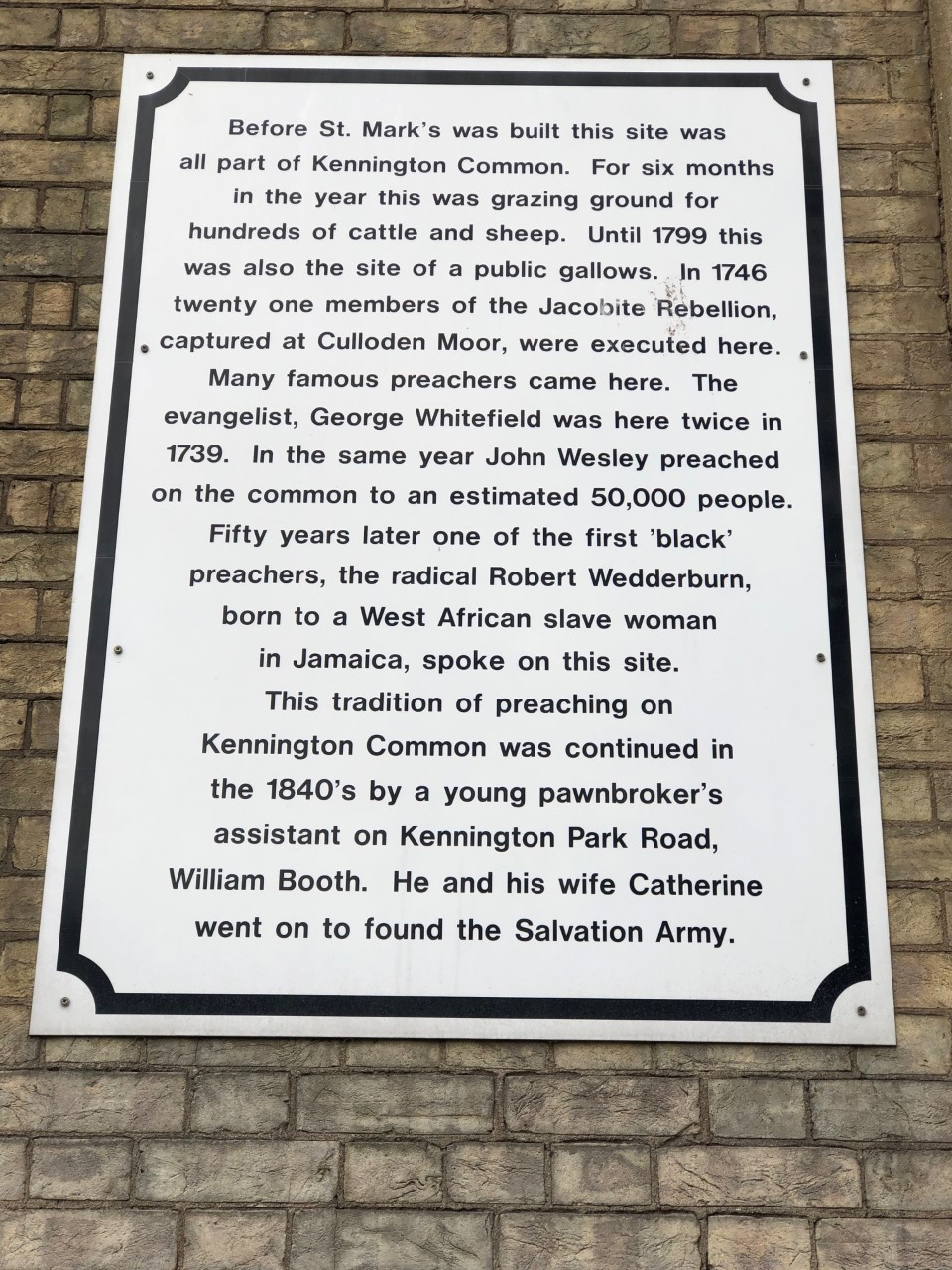
Plaque at St Mark's Church, Kennington in 2022

The eighteenth century saw considerable development in Kennington. At the start of the century, the area was essentially a village on the southern roads into London, with a common on which public executions took place. On three dates in 1746, Francis Towneley and sixteen men who had taken part in the Jacobite rising were hanged, drawn and quartered at Kennington Common.

The area was significant enough, however, to be recognised in the Peerage of Great Britain and in 1726, the title Earl of Kennington was assumed by Prince William, Duke of Cumberland.

The development of Kennington came about through access to London, which happened when, in 1750, Westminster Bridge was constructed. In 1751, Kennington Road was built from Kennington Common (as it then was; now Kennington Park) to Westminster Bridge Road.

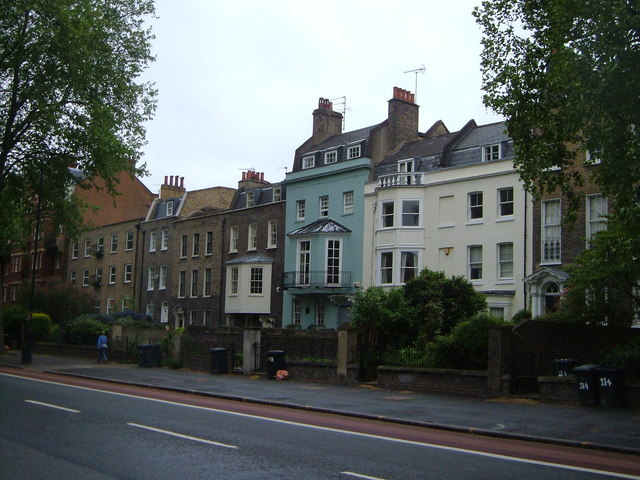
Kennington Road was constructed in 1751, and houses were soon built along it.

By the 1770s, the development of Kennington into its modern form was well underway. Terraces of houses were built on the east side of Kennington Road and Cleaver Square (then called Prince's Square) was laid out in 1788. Michael Searles, architect and developer, built semi-detached houses along Kennington Park Road in the 1790s.

A fraudster from Camberwell, named Badger, was the last person to be hanged at Kennington Common, in 1799.

=== 19th century ===
The modern street pattern of Kennington was formed by the early nineteenth century. The village had become a semi-rural suburb with grand terraced houses.

In the early nineteenth century, Kennington Common was a place of ill-repute. Various attempts were made by the Grand Surrey Canal to purchase the land to build a canal basin, but all of these failed. Because the area had been so rapidly developed and populated in the second half of the eighteenth century, by the nineteenth century, the Common was no longer used for grazing cattle and other agricultural purposes. It became a rubbish dump, a meeting place for radical crowds and an embarrassment to the area. Common rights were extinguished over one corner of the land and in 1824, St. Mark's Church was built on the site of the gallows. One of the four "Waterloo Churches" of south London, the church was opened by the Archbishop of Canterbury. In 1852, at the initiative of the minister of St. Mark's Church, the Common was enclosed and became the first public park in south London.

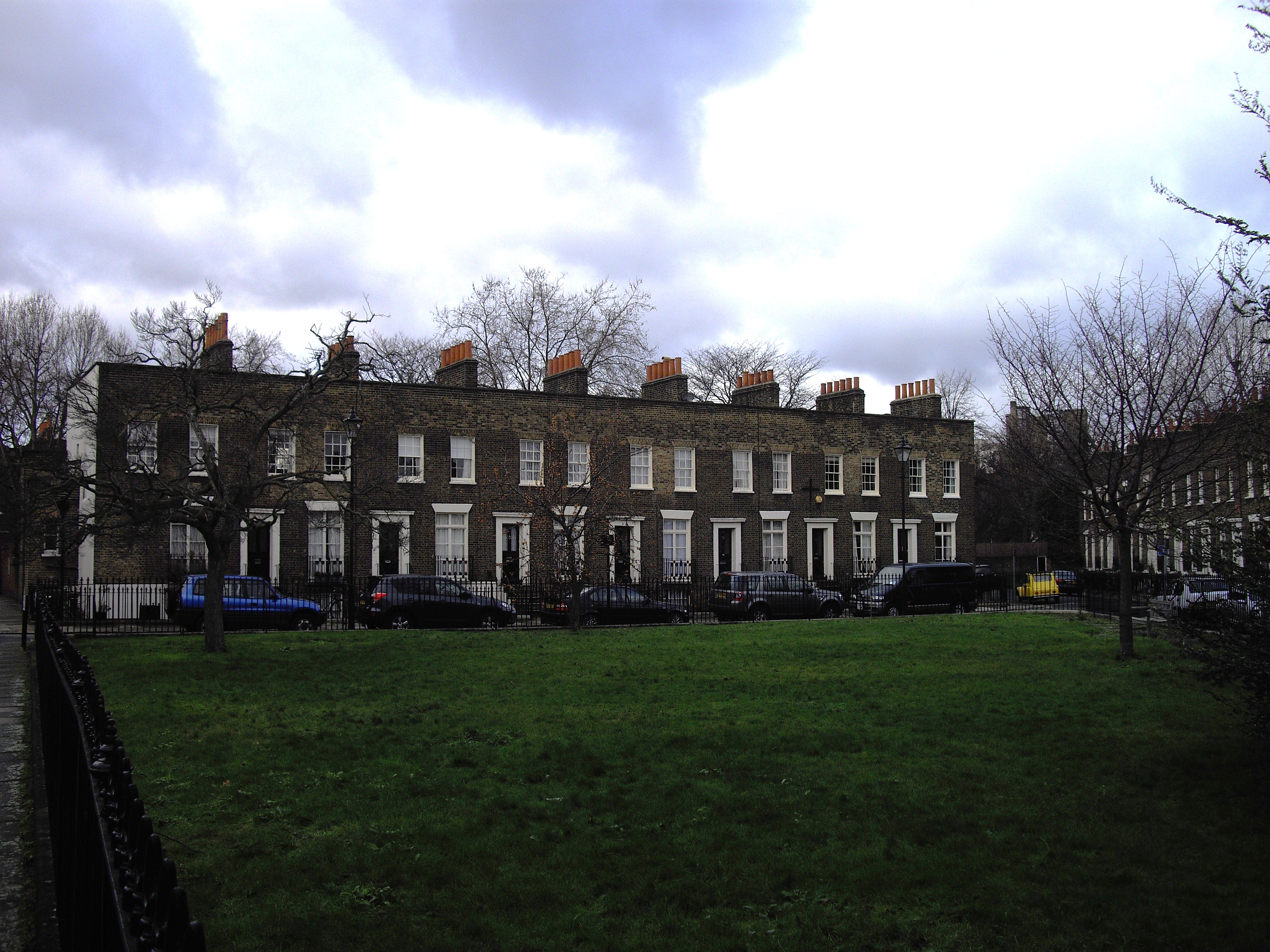
Walcot Square was, like most of Kennington's 19th-century development, built in the gaps between main roads.

Pockets of land between the main roads were built upon in the early nineteenth century. Walcot Square and St Mary's Gardens were laid out in the 1830s on land formerly used as a market garden. Imperial Court, on Kennington Lane, was built in 1836 for the Licensed Victuallers' School. The first stone was laid by Prime Minister William Lamb, 2nd Viscount Melbourne, in the name of King William IV.

The Oval cricket ground was leased to Surrey County Cricket Club from the Duchy of Cornwall in 1845, and the adjacent gasometers (themselves an international sporting landmark) were constructed in 1853.

Dense building and the carving-up of large houses for multiple occupation caused Kennington to be "very seriously over-populated in 1859, when diphtheria appeared" (recorded by Karl Marx in Das Kapital).

The church of St John the Divine, Kennington, which was to be described by the poet John Betjeman as "the most magnificent church in South London", was designed by George Edmund Street (architect of the Royal Courts of Justice on Strand, London), and was built between 1871 and 1874.

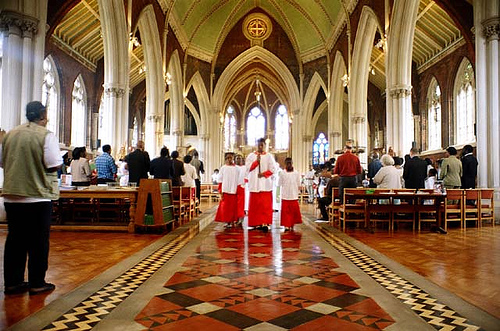
The nave of St John the Divine, Kennington

The Durning Library, at Kennington Cross, was designed in 1889 by Sidney R. J. Smith, architect of the Tate Gallery (as it was known before it became Tate Britain), and is a fine example of the Gothic Revival style. The library was a gift to the people of Kennington from Jemina Durning Smith.

A men's public convenience, which had been built opposite in 1898, is now preserved as an arts venue and is likely to have been used by a young Charlie Chaplin who writes in his autobiography of a night when he was locked out of the family room and listened all night to the music in the newly opened White Hart pub, now The Tommyfield. When his mother fell on hard times he was taken with his brother Sydney to another Kennington landmark the old Lambeth Workhouse now the home of the Cinema Museum.

Kennington station was opened as "Kennington (New Street)" in 1890 by the City of London and Southwark Subway, but is in fact on the boundary of Newington, Surrey and Kennington and as such is now in the London Borough of Southwark.

The poverty map of London, created by Charles Booth in 1898–99, identifies a mixture of classifications for the streets of the district; Kennington Park Road, for example, corresponds with the description "Middle class. Well-to-do". Most streets are classified as "Mixed. Some comfortable, others poor". There are also several scattered streets which are considered to be "Poor. 18s. to 21s. a week for a moderate family". The map shows that there existed in the district a great disparity of wealth and comfort between near-neighbours.

=== 20th-century history ===
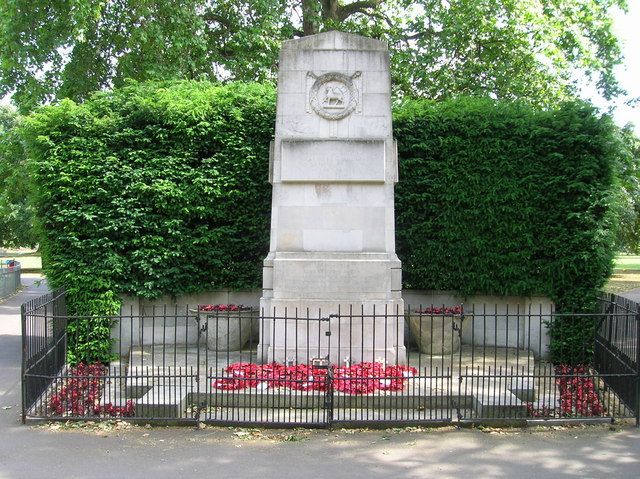
Kennington War Memorial

Two social forces were at work in Kennington at different times during the twentieth century: decline, and – later – gentrification. Decline began in the early part of the twentieth century. Middle-class households ceased to employ servants and no longer sought the large houses of Kennington, preferring the suburbs of outer London. Houses in Kennington were suited to multiple occupation and were divided into flats and bedsits, providing cheap lodgings for lower-paid workers.

Kennington ceased to be the administrative centre for the Metropolitan Borough of Lambeth (as it then was) in 1908. The Old Town Hall, built on Kennington Road as a vestry hall for the local parish, was not large enough for the council to properly carry out its functions and a new town hall was built in Brixton. The Old Town Hall was the registered office of the Countryside Alliance until September 2015.

In 1913, Maud Pember Reeves selected Kennington for Round About a Pound a Week, which was a survey of social conditions in the district. She found "respectable but very poor people [who] live over a morass of such intolerable poverty that they unite instinctively to save those known to them from falling into it".

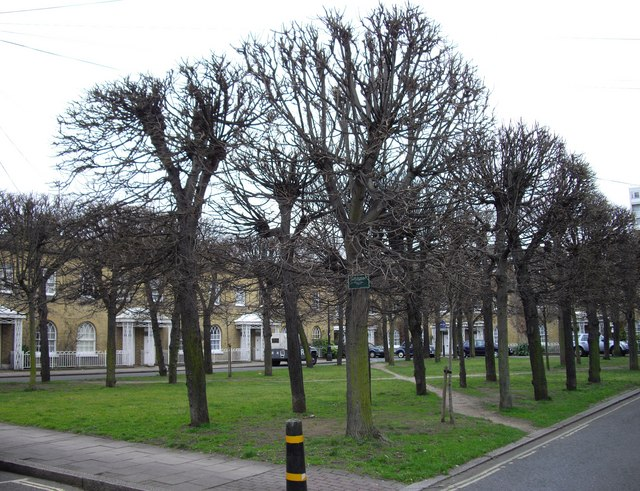
Courtenay Square was part of the Duchy of Cornwall's major redevelopment of part of the district in the early twentieth century.

In an initiative to improve the district, from 1915, the Duchy of Cornwall set about an ambitious project to redevelop land. Courtenay Square, Courtenay Street, Cardigan Street, Denny Street and Denny Crescent were laid out to a design by architects Stanley Davenport Adshead, Stanley Churchill Ramsay and J. D. Coleridge, in a Neo-Georgian style.

In 1922, Lambeth Hospital on Brook Drive was created from a former workhouse. Under the control of the London County Council, Lambeth Hospital, which had a capacity of 1,250 patients in 1939, was one of the largest hospitals in London. After the National Health Service was formed, Lambeth Hospital became an acute general hospital. In 1976, the North Wing of St. Thomas' Hospital opened; services transferred there, and Lambeth Hospital was closed. A substantial part of the site has today been redeveloped for apartments, although some buildings are occupied by the Lambeth Community Care Centre.

Kennington station was substantially remodelled in 1925 to accommodate the Charing Cross branch of the Northern line along with the improvements to the City and South London Railway to form the Northern line. Because tram and bus routes converged at Kennington, in the 1920s St. Mark's became known as the "tramwayman's church", and Kennington was referred to as the "Clapham Junction of the southern roads".

By 1926, construction of the Belgrave Hospital for Children, designed by Henry Percy Adams and Charles Holden, was complete. The hospital was subsumed within the King's College Hospital Group and closed in 1985. It was restored and converted to apartments in 1994.

In the 1930s, the Duchy of Cornwall continued to redevelop its estate in the district and employed architect Louis de Soissons to design a number of buildings in a Neo-Georgian style.

On 15 October 1940, the large trench air-raid shelter beneath Kennington Park was struck by a 50 lb bomb. The number of people killed remains unknown; it is believed by local historians that 104 people died. Forty-eight bodies were recovered.

The Brandon Estate was endowed in 1962 by the London County Council with Reclining Figure No. 3: a sculpture by Henry Moore.

St Agnes Place was a street of mid-Victorian terraces built for the servants of Buckingham Palace. Lambeth Council had decided to demolish the street to extend Kennington Park and the houses were empty by the late 1960s. In 1969, squatters moved into one of the houses and later entered the other empty properties and established a Rastafari temple. The street became London's longest-running squat. From 1977, Lambeth Council sought to evict the squatters and eventually succeeded at the High Court in 2005. The houses and the temple were declared to be unfit for human habitation and were pulled down in 2007. The Kennington Park Extension now covers much of the site.

Lambeth Council designated much of Kennington a Conservation Area in 1968, the boundary of which was extended in 1979 and in 1997. Lambeth Council's emphasis on conserving and protecting Kennington's architectural heritage and enhancing its attractive open spaces for recreation and leisure is illustrated by restoration of the centre of the listed Cleaver Square in the last decade of the twentieth century. Originally grassed over in the 1790s, the centre of Cleaver Square had by the 1870s become a garden circumscribed by a formal path, but by 1898 it had been cultivated as a nursery with greenhouses. In 1927 the centre of Cleaver Square was acquired by the London County Council to forestall a proposal to build on it, and more trees were then planted and the garden was gravelled over as a recreation ground. During the war years, in particular, the recreation area became somewhat derelict but during the 1950s Cleaver Square's inherent charm was recognised anew and its fortunes once more began to rise. In 1995, Lambeth Council resolved, with the backing of English Heritage, a grant from the Heritage Lottery Fund, and donations from residents of Cleaver Square, to restore the centre of the square to provide once again an attractive and peaceful public space for the people of Kennington. In the summer months many people from Kennington and further afield play pétanque in the centre of the square.

=== 21st-century gentrification ===
In recent years, Kennington has experienced gentrification, principally because of its location and good transport links to the West End and the City of London. In London: A Social History, Roy Porter describes how "Victorian villas in ... Kennington, long debased by use as lodging-houses, were transformed into luxury flats for young professionals or snips for first-time buyers – or were repossessed by the class of family for whom they had first been built"; and "Chambers London Gazetteer" observes the "reuniting of formerly subdivided properties" as "decline is being reversed".

It is difficult to identify a single defining reason for this change. The principal factors are location and transport. The good architectural and structural quality of many properties in Kennington – characterised by Georgian and Victorian terraces of yellow London stock brick, typically three storeys or higher, fronting the main roads and squares – has unquestionably contributed to the gentrification of the area. Nevertheless, a significant proportion of housing in the area is council-owned, including some council estates adjacent to Kennington Lane, leading up to Elephant and Castle, and around the Kennington Park area. In the twenty-first century there has been an ongoing programme by Lambeth Council of upgrading its stock of housing and in many cases improving its external appearance. The area's varied social texture demonstrates the population mix.

== Governance ==
The local authority is Lambeth London Borough Council. Kennington is a standalone ward, represented by three Labour Party councillors. Council elections take place every four years.

The Member of Parliament for the Vauxhall and Camberwell Green constituency, which includes Kennington, is currently the Labour Co-operative MP Florence Eshalomi, who has been the MP since December 2019. Kennington is within the Lambeth and Southwark London Assembly constituency.

== Geography ==
Kennington has no official boundaries but the ancient manorial boundaries are easily discerned and, for historical purposes, this article has confined itself to them. Estate agents use the term more loosely so as to promote any particular property they wish to act in disposal of, and modern classifications of which areas fall within the district vary. The modern layout of Kennington reflects development as a linear settlement. Within the London post town, the postcode district for Kennington is SE11. The SE11 postcode captures most of the district, although the peripheries of Kennington are within the SE17, SE1, SW8 and SW9 postcodes. The south-western part of the district – Kennington Oval – protrudes towards Vauxhall.

Nearest places: Vauxhall, Waterloo, Walworth, Newington (usually known as Elephant and Castle), Stockwell, Camberwell, Brixton, and Lambeth North.

== Culture and community ==
Kennington is essentially a multi-ethnic area with a mixed and varied population, all falling within different geodemographic strands. The area attracts young and affluent incomers who fall within the ABC1 demographic strand of the NRS social grade spectrum.

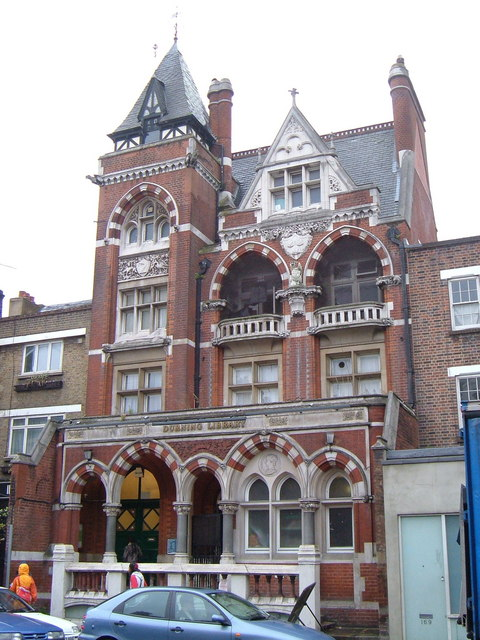
Durning Library, Kennington

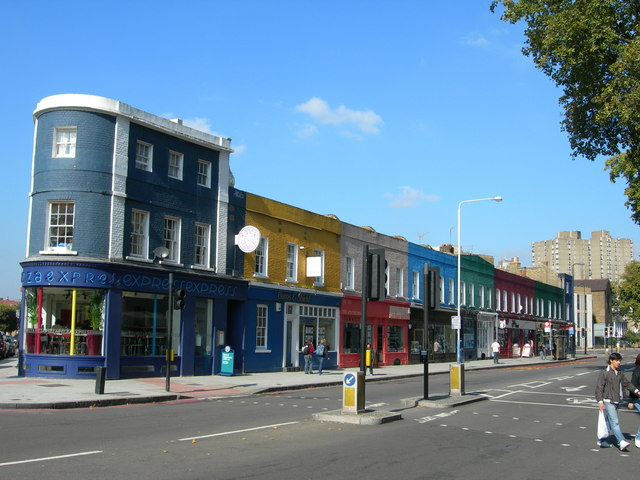
Brightly coloured shops at Kennington Cross

Kennington is within the Division bell zone for the Houses of Parliament. This means that, at least in theory, it is within eight minutes from the division lobbies of the Houses of Parliament. A large number of members of parliament and civil servants live within the area. An article in The Sunday Times described Kennington as "the politicians' enclave across the Thames from Westminster"; and The Times observed that "Kennington ... is the suburb that has featured the most in the MPs' expenses scandal. Hazel Blears and Alistair Darling are only two of the ministers with Kennington second homes".

Kennington Road and Kennington Lane, south of Kennington Cross, could properly be described as the "shopping area" of Kennington. This area is identified as a "Local Centre" in the London Plan. There is a range of local shops, restaurants, cafés and estate agents, and a post office. There is a Tesco supermarket on Kennington Lane. The area has a number of pubs and some bars. There are two theatres in Kennington: the White Bear Theatre and the Oval House Theatre and the area has an active residents' association called the Kennington Association. The Friends of Kennington Park is a local organisation, involved with the promotion of Kennington Park as a valuable resource for the community. Kennington is also home to The Cinema Museum – a popular local venue for watching films and learning about the history of cinema.

A weekly farmers' market takes place on Saturdays from 10 am to 3 pm at St. Mark's Church opposite Oval tube station.

The distillery of Beefeater Gin – the only premium gin still distilled in London – is situated in Montford Place.

The City and Guilds of London Art School, one of the longest-established art colleges in the country, has been at Kennington Park Road since 1879.

Kennington in literature and film

- In 1853, Bleak House, by Charles Dickens, was published. Mr Guppy, the law clerk, takes a "commodious tenement" on Walcot Square.
- In 1915, Of Human Bondage, by W. Somerset Maugham, was published. Philip Carey, the protagonist, finds lodgings in the "vulgar respectability" of Kennington.
- In 1945, London Belongs to Me, by Norman Collins, was published. The central setting for the novel is a boarding-house at 10, Dulcimer Street, Kennington.
- Scenes from the film Passport to Pimlico were filmed in and around Kennington. The film was released in 1949.
- Scenes from the 1990 film The Krays were filmed in Kennington.
- "The Jolly Gardeners" pub on Black Prince Road was adopted for Snatch and cast as "The Drowned Trout" in 2000.
- In 2001, London Boulevard, by Ken Bruen, was published. Kennington is a setting within the novel, and features in the 2010 film of the same name.
- In the 2008 film Traitor, Don Cheadle's character Samir Horn is shown exiting Kennington tube station and walking up Kennington Park Road in the direction of Oval.
- In the 2010 film The Ghost Writer, fictitious former Prime Minister Adam Lang is revealed through old letters to have started his political career while living at an address in Kennington.
- Scenes from the 2011 film The Iron Lady were filmed in Kennington.
- The 2011 film Attack the Block was set in Kennington.
- Scenes from the 2014 film Kingsman: The Secret Service were filmed at The Black Prince pub in Kennington.
- The video for the song "Come On Eileen" by Dexys Midnight Runners was filmed in Kennington. The 1982 music video was directed by Julien Temple.

== Landmarks ==
=== Kennington Park ===
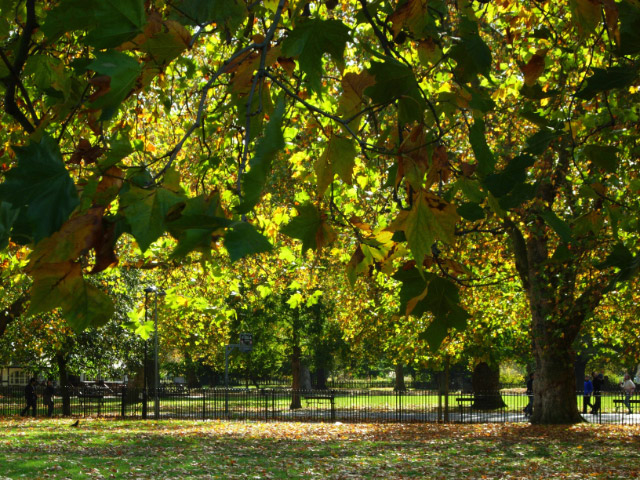
Kennington Park

Kennington Park, laid out by Victorian architect James Pennethorne, and St Mark's Churchyard now cover the site of Kennington Common. The Park was originally designated one of the Royal Parks of London (today, management of the Park is undertaken by Lambeth Council).

The Park, historically, was a place for executions, a Speakers' Corner for public gatherings for political and religious purposes, and a place for entertainment and sporting events.

In the 1730s, Methodists John Wesley and George Whitefield preached to thousands on Kennington Common. In 1746 the Surrey County Gallows at the southern end of the Common was used for the execution of nine leaders of the Jacobite rebellion of 1745. The Common was also where the Chartists gathered for their biggest demonstration in 1848. "The Gymnastic Society" met regularly at Kennington Common during the second half of the eighteenth century to play football. The Society – sometimes claimed to be the world's first football club – consisted of London-based natives of Cumberland and Westmorland.

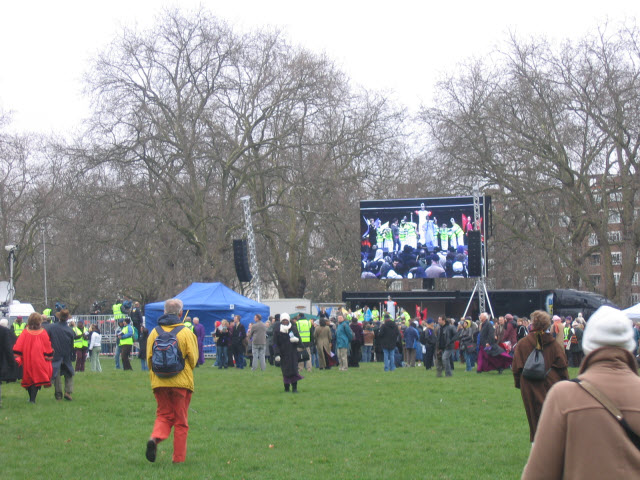
People gather for a rally in Kennington Park

The tradition of political gathering at Kennington Park in advance of marches upon Parliament returned in the 1970s. In 1986, the Park was the location for the Gay Pride march of that year, and for several years thereafter. On 31 March 1990, some 200,000 people amassed at Kennington Park to march upon Trafalgar Square, in protest against the Community Charge. This, during the course of the day, escalated into mass disturbances: the Poll Tax Riots. In April 1997, a march organised by Reclaim the Streets set off from the Park for central London; and in May 2004, the Park was the starting point for a march to the Cannabis Festival at Brockwell Park. In March 2007, the Archbishop of Canterbury preached at Kennington Park to mark the passing of the Slave Trade Act 1807. The Park had been a significant location for important anti-slave trade rallies. In March 2011, the Park was the South London starting point for a feeder march to the 2011 anti-cuts protest in London. In November 2012, the Park was the location of the "Demo 2012" student rally against higher tuition fees.

=== Kennington Oval (The Oval) ===
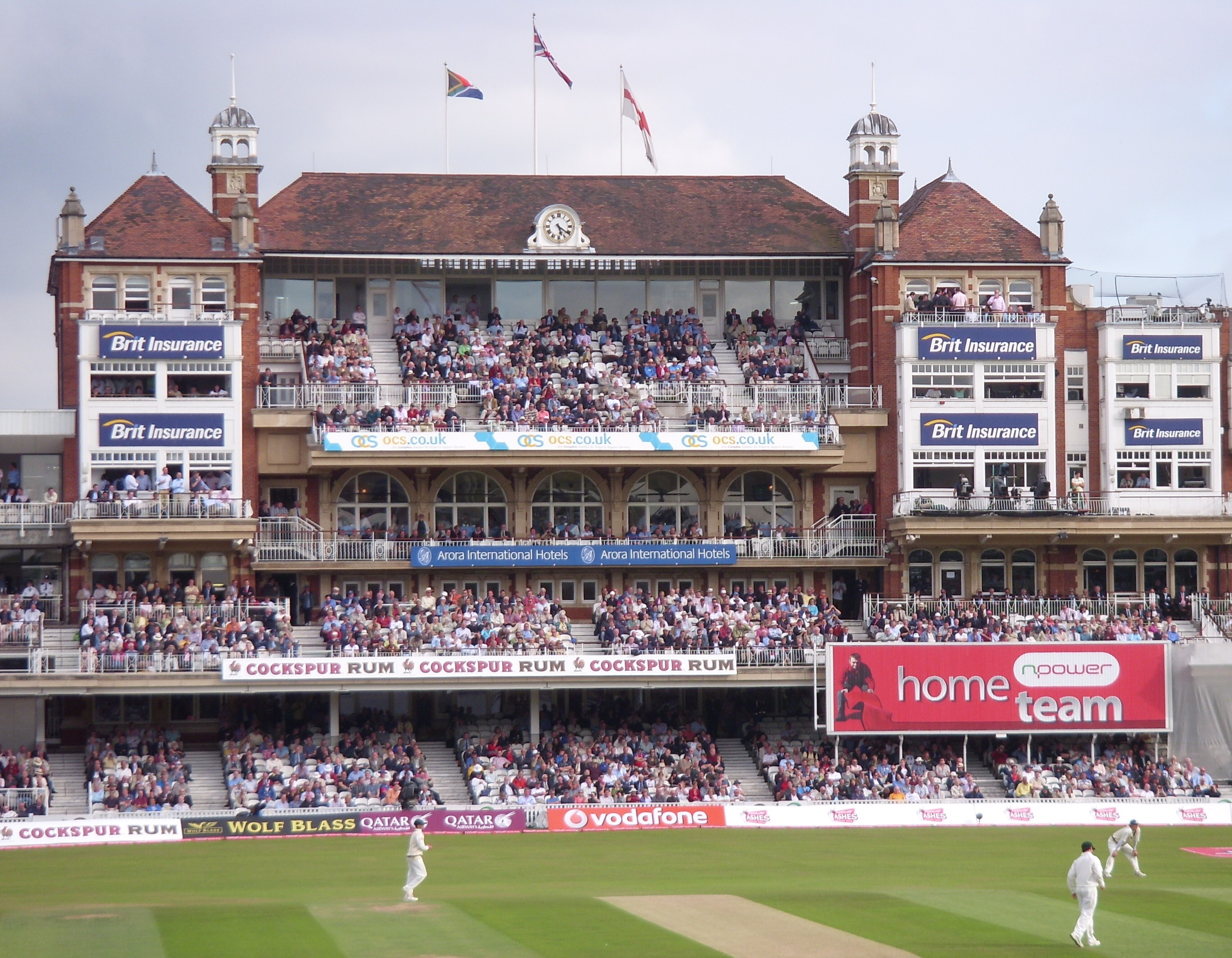
Play at the Oval

The Oval, officially currently rebranded as "The Kia Oval", is the home ground for Surrey County Cricket Club and hosts the final Test match of the English summer season. The Oval was the first ground in the United Kingdom to host Test cricket, was the location for the England v Scotland representative matches, the first ever international football match, the first FA Cup final in 1872, and held the second ever rugby union international match between England and Scotland in 1872. England's unfortunate performance against Australia here in 1882 gave rise to The Ashes. The Oval has been labelled with the sobriquet "the Grand Old Lady" in recognition of the significant role the ground has played in the development of modern sport.

The presence of the Oval as a large green space available for cricket is down to an unrealised street plan. For many years prior to its use as a cricket ground, this area was used as a cabbage garden.

=== Stane Street ===
Kennington Park Road, which continues beyond Kennington as Clapham Road, is a long and straight stretch of road because it follows the old Roman Stane Street. This ran down from the Roman London Bridge to Chichester via the gap in the North Downs at Box Hill near Dorking. Another Roman road branched off opposite Kennington Road and went through what is now Kennington Park and down the Brixton Road. It carried on through the North Downs near Caterham to Hassocks, just north of the South Downs.

== Transport ==
=== Rail ===
Kennington is served by several London Underground stations.

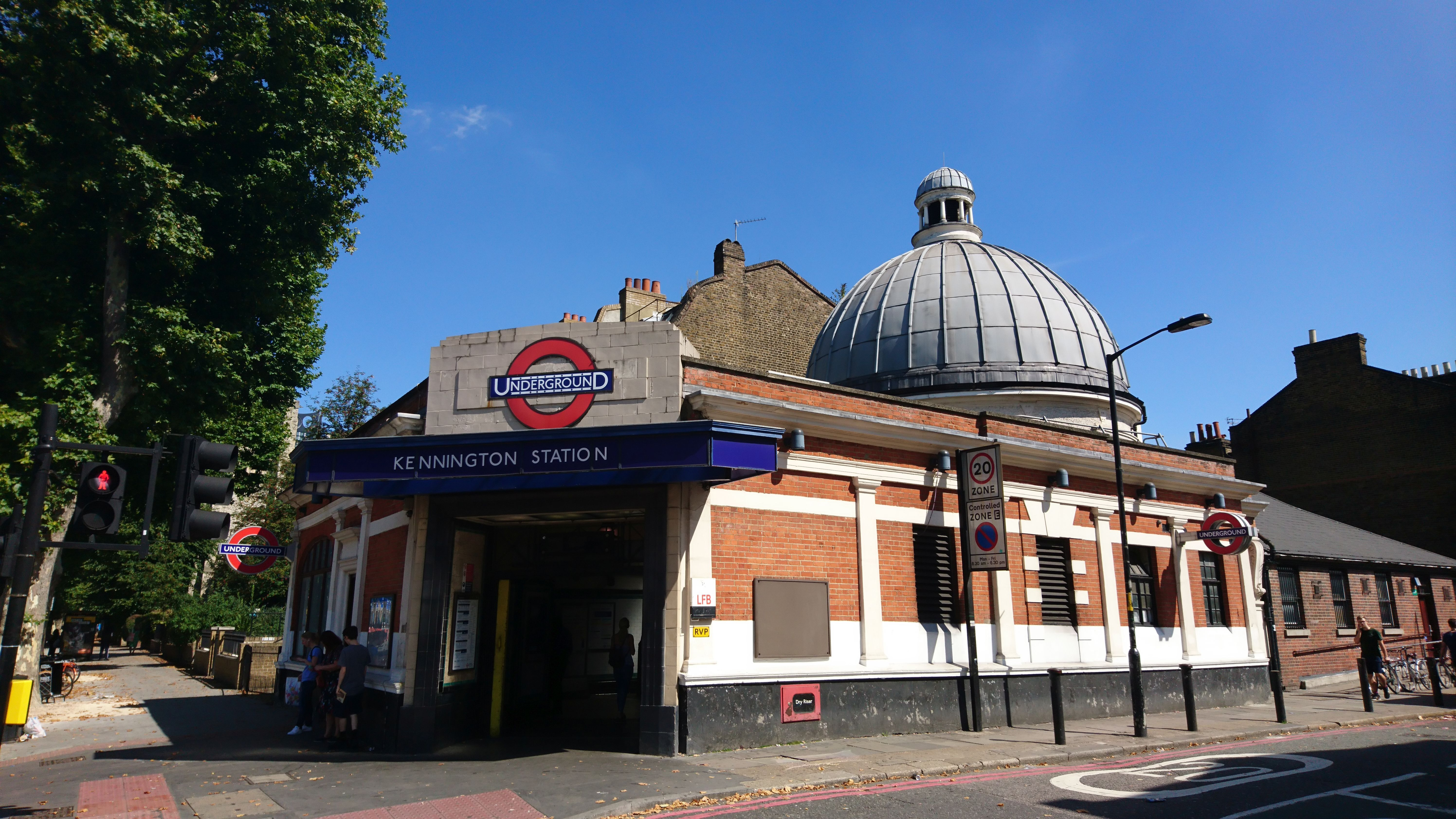
Kennington tube station is on the Northern line.

Kennington tube station is on the Northern line, providing the area with direct connections northbound to Central London, the City of London and North London. Some trains terminate at Kennington (on the Charing Cross branch), but others continue southbound to Morden via Clapham and South Wimbledon. The Northern line extension to Battersea links the station southbound to Nine Elms and Battersea Power Station.

Oval tube station is also on the Northern line.

Other nearby stations include Lambeth North on the Bakerloo line and Vauxhall on the Victoria line. Vauxhall is also on the National Rail network. All trains are operated by South Western Railway in or out of Waterloo.

=== Bus ===
London Buses routes 3, 36, 59, 133, 155, 159, 185, 196, 333, 360, 415, 436 serve Kennington. Routes 36 and 159 operate 24 hours, daily. Routes N3, N109, N133, N136 and N155 also serve the area at night.

=== Road ===
Several major routes pass through the area, including:

- A3 (Kennington Park Road): northeast towards Elephant & Castle, London Bridge and the City of London; southwest towards Stockwell, Clapham, Guildford and Portsmouth.
- A23 (Kennington Road/Brixton Road): northbound towards Lambeth, Westminster and Waterloo; southbound towards Brixton, Streatham and Gatwick Airport (via the M23).
- A202 (Kennington Oval/Camberwell New Road): northwest towards Vauxhall, Victoria and Hyde Park Corner; southeast towards Camberwell, Peckham, New Cross and destinations in Kent.
- A3204 (Kennington Lane): northeast to the A3 and Elephant & Castle; southeast to Vauxhall.

=== Cycling ===
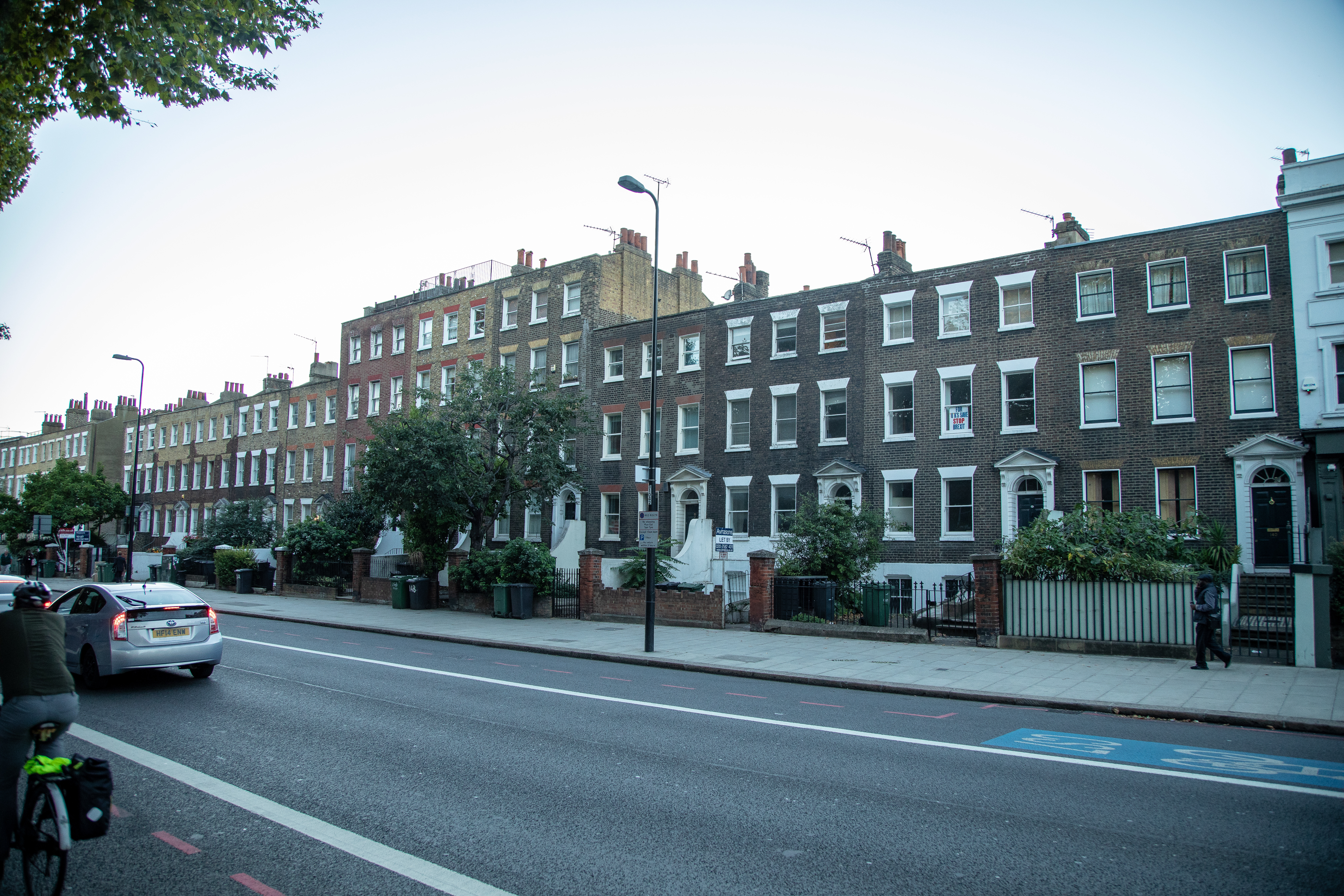
Cycle Superhighway 7 (CS7) is marked using blue paint along A3/Kennington Park Road.

Cycling infrastructure in the area is managed by Transport for London (TfL) and the London Borough of Lambeth. Kennington is linked to other areas of London by several cycle routes, including:

- Cycle Superhighway 5 (CS5): Kennington Oval to Pimlico via Vauxhall. The route is unbroken, signposted and runs on segregated cycle track. As the route intersects with CS8, Kennington is linked to Westminster and Battersea on an entirely traffic-free cycle route.
- Cycle Superhighway 7 (CS7): unbroken, signposted cycle route running alongside the A3/Kennington Park Road primarily on cycle lanes. The route runs northbound to Southwark Bridge, linking the area to Elephant & Castle, Waterloo and the City of London. Southbound, the route runs directly to Colliers Wood via Stockwell, Clapham and Tooting.
- Quietway 5 (Q5): Cycle route on residential streets from Norbury to Waterloo, via Streatham, Clapham, Stockwell, Kennington and Lambeth. The route is unbroken, but indirect.
- Camberwell New Road: Cycle lanes run in both directions either side of A202/Camberwell New Road.

Santander Cycles, a London-wide bicycle-sharing system, operates in Kennington.

== Education ==
There are seven primary schools within the Kennington area:

- Archbishop Sumner School (Church of England)
- Henry Fawcett Primary School
- St. Anne's Primary School (Roman Catholic)
- St. Mark's Primary School (Church of England)
- Vauxhall Primary School
- Walnut Tree Walk Primary School
- Keyworth Primary School

There is one secondary school within the Kennington area:

- Lilian Baylis Technology School (admits boys and girls aged 11–16)

== Notable people ==
- William Hogarth, artist, lived in Kennington in the early part of the eighteenth century.
- David Ricardo, the celebrated political economist, lived in Kennington in the 1790s.
- William Blake, artist and visionary, occupied a house at Hercules Road, at the boundary of Kennington and Lambeth, between 1790 and 1800.
- Eliza Cook, author, Chartist poet and writer, lived in Kennington in the first half of the nineteenth century.
- William Bligh, Captain of HMS Bounty, against whom the Mutiny on the Bounty was brought, occupied a house at Lambeth Road, near the Imperial War Museum. He died in 1817, and was buried at St. Mary's, Lambeth.
- William Hosking, architect and civil engineer, who claimed to have formed the design for the British Museum Reading Room, and was the first Professor of Architecture at King's College London, occupied a house in Walcot Square in the 1840s.
- Sir William Chandler Roberts-Austen metallurgist – after whom austenite is named – was born in Kennington in 1843.
- William Booth, founder and General of The Salvation Army, found work and lodging at a pawnbroker shop in Kennington Park Road in 1849.
- E. Nesbit, children's author, best known for The Railway Children, was born in Kennington in 1858.
- Samuel Prout, watercolorist, lived from 1849 to 1850 in Kennington Road.
- Felix Slade – a lawyer and philanthropist, who endowed three Slade Professorships of Fine Art at Oxford University, Cambridge University and University College London, and bequeathed most of his art collection to the British Museum – lived and died in Walcot Place, off Kennington Road. He donated a large fountain to Kennington Park – the Slade Memorial Fountain.
- Roy Redgrave, actor, and patriarch of the Redgrave acting family, was born in Kennington in 1873.
- Vincent van Gogh, artist, lived at Ivy Cottage, 395 Kennington Road, from August to October 1874, and from December 1874 to May 1875.
- Field Marshal Bernard Montgomery, 1st Viscount Montgomery of Alamein, British Army officer. Montgomery was born into an Ulster Scots family in Harleyford Street in 1887.
- Charlie Chaplin, actor, born in 1889, grew up in Kennington, and lived in several different houses at different times, Methley Street and Kennington Road.
- Harry Roberts, who was jailed for life for murdering three policemen in the Massacre of Braybrook Street in 1966, was born in Kennington in 1936. He spent 48 years in prison.
- Don Letts, film director and musician, born in 1956, was educated in Kennington.
- Bob Marley, Jamaican musician, stayed at a property in St. Agnes Place on occasions in the 1970s.
- James Callaghan, who was Prime Minister of the United Kingdom in 1976, initially insisted that he did not want to inflict upon his wife the "discomforts" of living at 10 Downing Street, and elected to stay at his flat on Kennington Park Road. He was eventually persuaded, in the interests of security, to move to 10 Downing Street.
- William Tallon, Steward and Page of the Backstairs in the household of Queen Elizabeth the Queen Mother, typically referred to by newspapers as "Backstairs Billy", moved from Clarence House in 2002 to a Duchy of Cornwall flat in Kennington. He died in 2007.
- David Laws, politician, was involved in a controversy concerning a property which he occupied in Kennington.
- Lembit Öpik, politician.
- Kevin Spacey, actor.
- Ted Rogers, comedian and host of 3-2-1.
- Sarah Waters, author, who wrote (among other novels) Tipping the Velvet.
- Oliver Letwin, Member of Parliament, who was the victim of a confidence trick at his Kennington home.
- Michael Connarty, Member of Parliament.
- Jack Straw, Member of Parliament; former Home Secretary; former Foreign Secretary; former Lord Privy Seal and Leader of the House of Commons; former Lord High Chancellor of Great Britain and Secretary of State for Justice.
- Anthony Steen, politician.
- Stephen Hesford, politician.
- Alistair Darling, Member of Parliament and former Chancellor of the Exchequer.
- Charles Kennedy, Member of Parliament and former leader of the Liberal Democrat Party.
- Phil Willis, Baron Willis of Knaresborough, politician.
- Kenneth Clarke, Member of Parliament, Secretary of State for Justice and Lord Chancellor.
- Ronnie Campbell, Member of Parliament for Blyth, Northumberland.
- Florence Welch, musician and frontwoman of Florence & The Machine.
- Karen Gillan, actress
- David Ball electronic musician, member of Soft Cell
- Lady Colin Campbell, socialite, author, TV/radio personality.
- Alan Kitching, typographer
- Rory Kinnear, actor
- Jadon Sancho, footballer
