= Kennington Cross =

Coordinates: 51.488531°N 0.111227°W

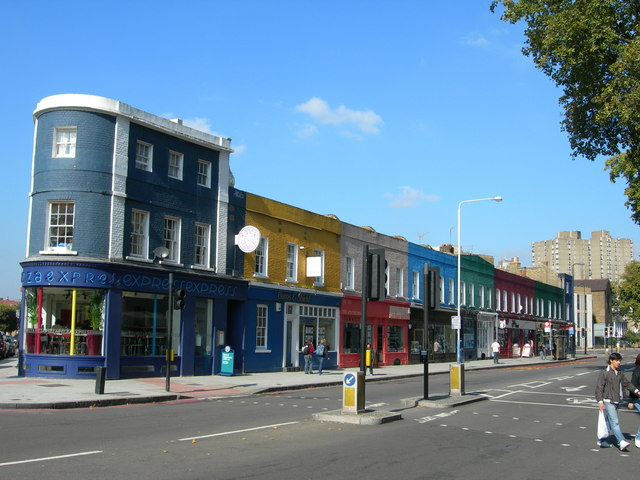

- Location within Greater London
- London borough: Lambeth
- Ceremonial county: Greater London
- Region: London
- Country: England
- Sovereign state: United Kingdom
- Post town: LONDON
- Postcode district: SE11
- Dialling code: 020
- Police: Metropolitan
- Fire: London
- Ambulance: London
- London Assembly: Lambeth and Southwark

Kennington Cross is a locality in the London Borough of Lambeth. It is at the junction of two major roads, Kennington Lane that links Vauxhall Cross with the Elephant and Castle and Kennington Road that runs from Waterloo to Kennington Park. At the junction are the Durning Library (London Borough of Lambeth), St Anselm's Church (Church of England) and The ArtsLav project, a nineteenth-century underground gents Victorian Lavatory converted into a small local arts venue. There are two large public houses, The Dog House, and The Tommyfield.
