= Kennington Park =

Public park in South London, the United Kingdom

Coordinates: 51°29′3″N 0°6′32″W

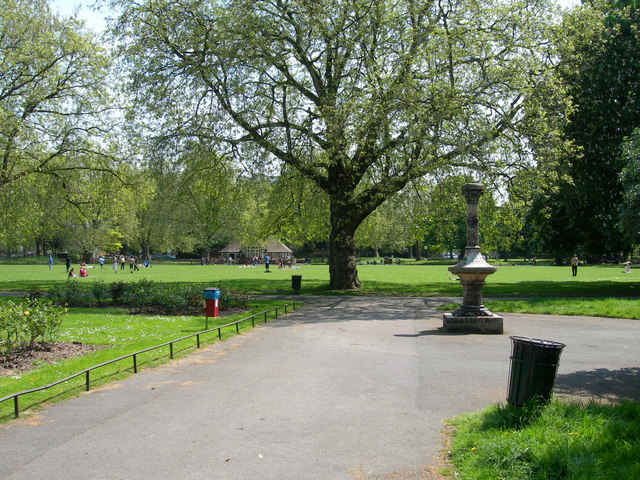
Tinworth Fountain in Kennington Park

Kennington Park is a public park in Kennington, south London and lies between Kennington Park Road and St Agnes Place. It was opened in 1854 on the site of what had been Kennington Common, where the Chartists gathered for their biggest "monster rally" on 10 April 1848. Soon after this demonstration the common was enclosed and, sponsored by the royal family, made into a public park.

Kennington Common was a site of public executions until 1800 as well as being an area for public speaking. Some of the most illustrious orators to speak here were Methodist founders George Whitefield and John Wesley who is reputed to have attracted a crowd of 30,000.

The common was one of the earliest London cricket venues and is known to have been used for top-class matches in 1724. Kennington Park hosts the first inner London community cricket ground, sponsored by Surrey County Cricket Club whose home, The Oval, is close to the park. Casual games of both cricket and football are regularly held in the park.

In the 1970s, the old tradition of mass gatherings returned to the park which was host to the start of many significant marches to Parliament. Today, a number of commercial and community events are held in the park each year and recently the Flower Garden was restored with a Heritage Lottery grant. The Friends of Kennington Park, FoKP, was founded in 2002 and provides a local forum for park issues as well as fundraising for improvements.

== Kennington Common ==
=== Before 1600 ===
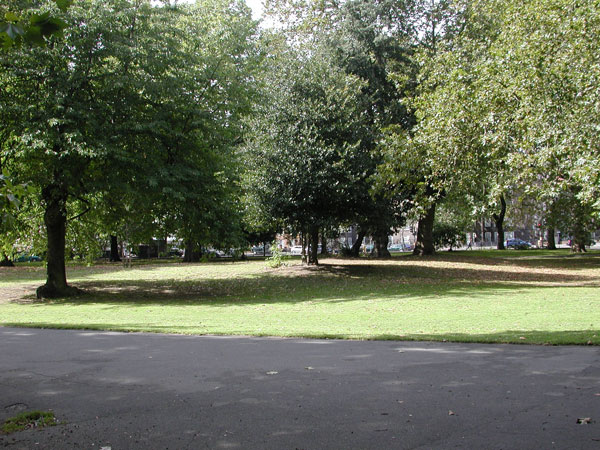
Probable site of ton or mound

Although there are no available written records of the area before 1600, analysis of the area's archaeology and landscape reveals its earlier history. Recently discovered post stumps in the south Thames foreshore near Vauxhall Bridge point to a ritual jetty or possibly the first London bridge, by the outlet of the River Effra, from around 1500 BC. The Effra formed the southerly boundary to the common.

Three closely related geographic features defined the area of Kennington Common as sacred in ancient times: the sharp bend in the river Effra before it flowed into the Thames, a strategic mound or tumulus, and an important fork in the main road from the river crossing which is now known as London Bridge. This made it a sacred place of 'national' assembly which may have related to the jetty or bridge. The mound may have also been used by the locals of the South London marsh community as a refuge from tidal flash floods. As the flood water receded, the river silt left a level field which was ideal for grazing animals or playing team ball games.

=== 17th century ===
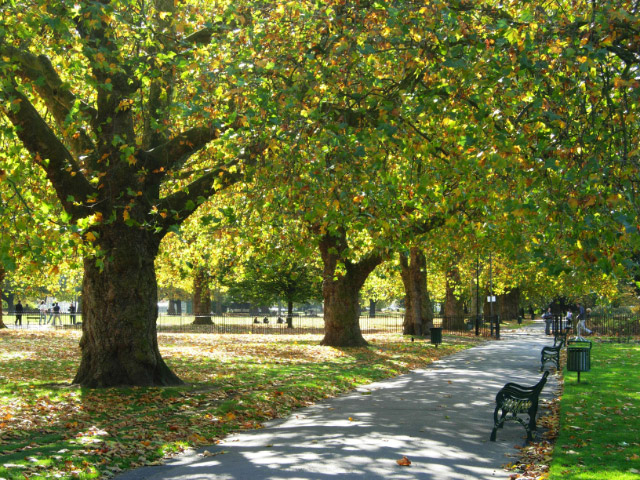
A path in the park

- 1600 gives the first record of the common. "The common was bounded on the South West by Vauxhall Creek" It seems that the common extended over marshy land to the South West of the Roman Road Stane Street, now Kennington Park Road. When the common became bounded by the Kennington Park Road is not known. There is a 1660 record of a common keeper being paid for grazing.
- 1661 The famous Vauxhall Pleasure Gardens are laid out nearby.
- 1678 First recorded execution at Kennington Common was that of Sarah Elston who was burnt for murdering her husband on 24 April. Kennington Common was the South London equivalent of Tyburn (now Marble Arch).
- 1678 John Masters and Gabriel Dean, highwaymen, executed on 24 April.
- 1679 Dorothy Lillingstone was executed for murder on 7 April.
- 1685 William Disney was executed for High Treason on 29 June.

=== 18th century ===
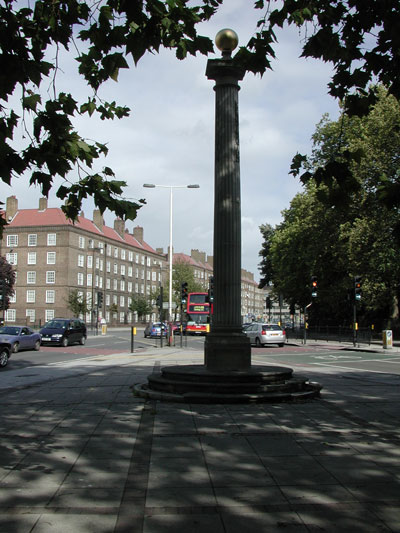
The road fork looking north 2004

"During the holiday season, Kennington Common in the last (18th) century was an epitome of "Bartlemy Fair", with booths, tents, caravans, and scaffolds, surmounted by flags. It also had one peculiarity, for, as we learn from "Merrie England in the Olden Time", it was a favourite spot for merryandrews, and other buffooneries in open rivalry, and competition with field-preachers and ranters. It was here that Mr. Maw-worm encountered the brickbats of his congregation, and had his "pious tail" illuminated with the squibs and crackers of the unregenerate."

- 1724 London v Dartford is the earliest known cricket match on Kennington Common
- 1725 First record of the Green Man and Horns Tavern near Kennington Common. The cricket played on the common used the Horns as a base. Also other sports including quoits and bowling were played.
- 1739 Methodists John Wesley and George Whitefield preach to 30,000. Whitefield is remembered in the nearby 'Whitefield House' home of the Evangelical Alliance. Dissenting Methodists, such as the son of a slave Robert Wedderburn, spoke in a more radical voice on Kennington Common speaking out against the enclosures and slavery (active from 1786 through 1813). Kennington Common was a key South London place for public speaking, acting as a kind of open air free university of the day.
- 1739 John Hannah executed for robbery and perjury.
- 1743 James Hunt and Thomas Collins hanged for sodomy at Kennington Common gallows.
- 1746 Col. Francis Towneley and eight men of the Manchester Regiment who had taken part in the Jacobite rising were hanged, drawn and quartered on 30 July.
- 1749 Richard Coleman executed "for a murder he did not commit" on 12 April.
- 1751 A road was "cut through gardens 80-foot wide" from Kennington Common to Westminster Bridge. (The Gentleman's Magazine Monday 16 December 1751). The road is Kennington Road and comes up to the common next to the Horns tavern.
- 1767 The common was flooded by a high tide coming up Vauxhall Creek.
- 1785 Last known use of the Common as a venue for first-class cricket.
- 1790 William Blake moved to North Lambeth and may have attended commons meetings in the 1790s, in all likelihood with Thomas Paine.
- 1792 Mungo, a black prize fighter breaks the jaw of his opponent, a carpenter, in a boxing match on the common. (Peter Linebaugh The London Hanged Verso 2003 p. 414)
- 1795 Lewis Jeremiah Avershaw an infamous highwayman, was executed for shooting a Peace Officer on 3 August.
- 1799 The last person to be hanged at the common (six years after public execution was ended at Tyburn) was a fraudster from nearby Camberwell by the name Badger.
- "The Gymnastic Society" met regularly at Kennington Common during the second half of the eighteenth century to play football The Society – arguably the world's first football club – consisted of London-based natives of Cumberland and Westmoreland.

=== 19th century ===
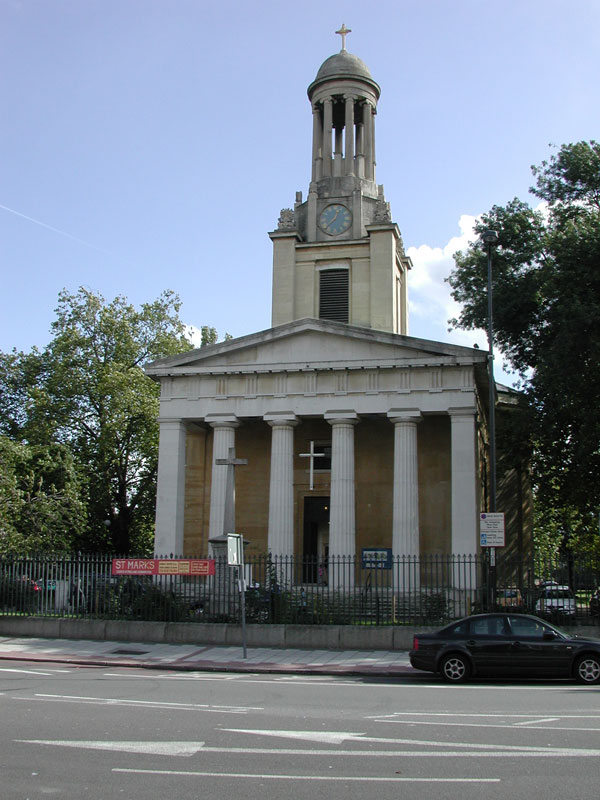
St Mark's Church, built on a corner of the common in 1824

- 1800 The much-respected Mr. Briant becomes landlord of the Horns runs a famous Glee Club. Briant died 1852 but his relatives still live in Kennington, one of whom chaired the Parks Management Advisory Committee in 1996.
- 1815 In February, a mob breaks windows 'round the Horns'. LifeGuards called out to quell the mob. The Riot Act was read. In 1819 The Peterloo Massacre signalled an end to repression by violence.
- 1818 Camberwell New Road is built running east/west, cutting the southern corner of the common off from the rest of it.
- 1824 St. Mark's Church by D. R. Roper, built on an enclosed corner of the common, over the river Effra. Promoted by the Church of England as the 'salvation of the common', twenty four years later it was the vicar of this church who led the move to enclose the whole common.
- 1832 First Reform Act, after which hustings were set up on Kennington Common (outside The Horns).
- 1845 Surrey County Cricket Club formed (22 August formally constituted on 18 October) at the Horns.

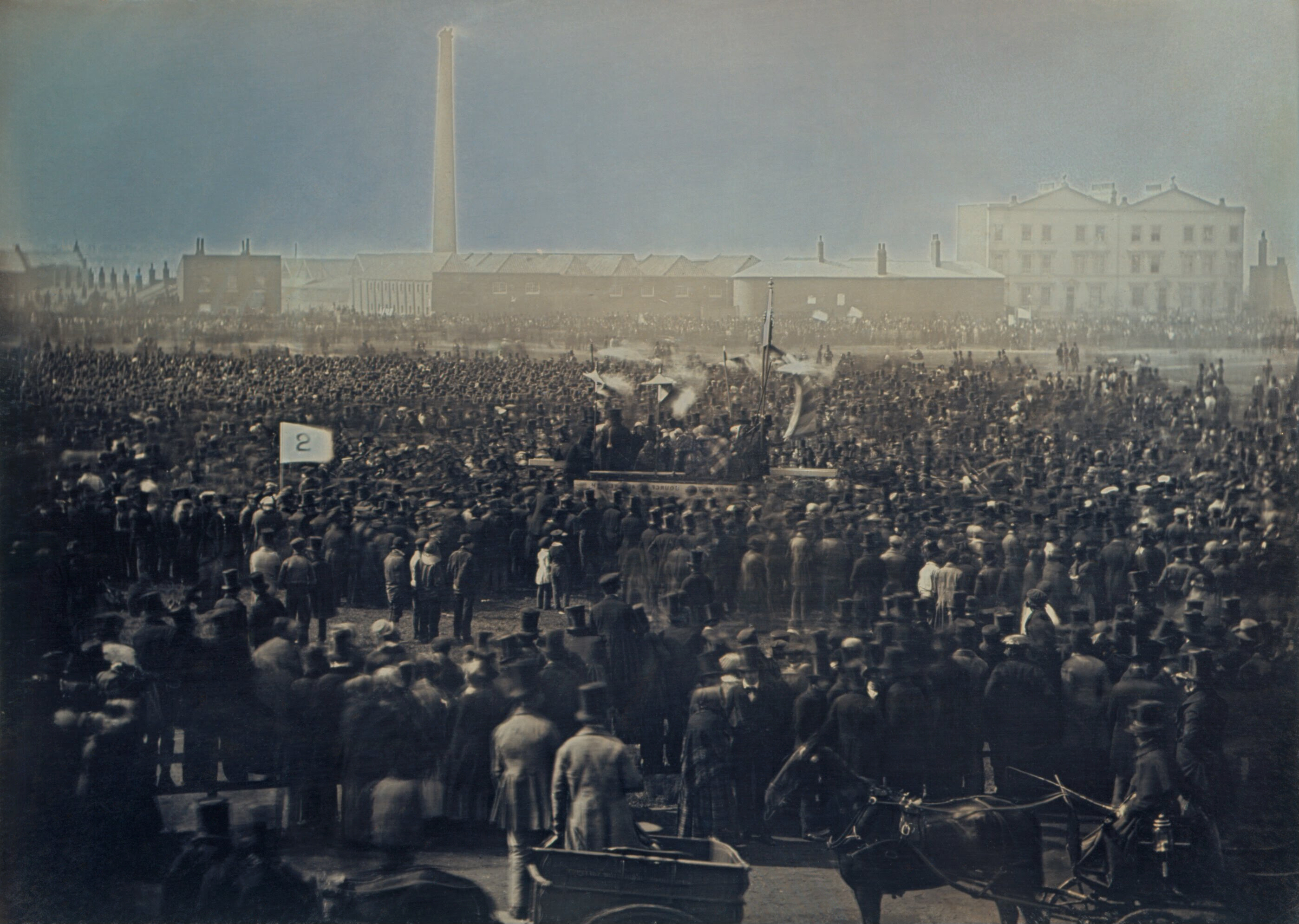
William Edward Kilburn's photograph of the 1848 Chartist meeting on Kennington Common

- 1848 10 April Chartist mass meeting organised by Black Briton and leader of London Chartists William Cuffay. Chartism was a federation of different groups who had agreed on a set of political demands for an inclusive people's democracy. Chartism was the first British national working class organisation. 1848 was known as the Year of Revolutions.
- 1848 First photograph of a crowd taken by William Kilburn probably from the Horns. The daguerreotype negative is now kept by and copyright Queen Elizabeth and is kept in the Royal archives at Windsor Castle.
- Around 1849 William Booth preached here.
- 1852 Kennington Common was enclosed. The petition for enclosure was led by the vicar of St. Mark's, aided by the young Prince of Wales. No more gathering or vulgar recreations were allowed without permission. The sacred mound was levelled, the common fenced and landscaped into an urban park. Planted with mostly sapling London Plane trees (which are still living). North and South game pitches are fenced with iron railings (removed during the Second World War).

"Inclosure, thou'rt a curse upon the land, And tasteless was the wretch who thy existence plann'd" John Clare the peasant poet from Peterborough (1793–1864) By now there were more people in cities than country. London's population had reached 2.5 million.

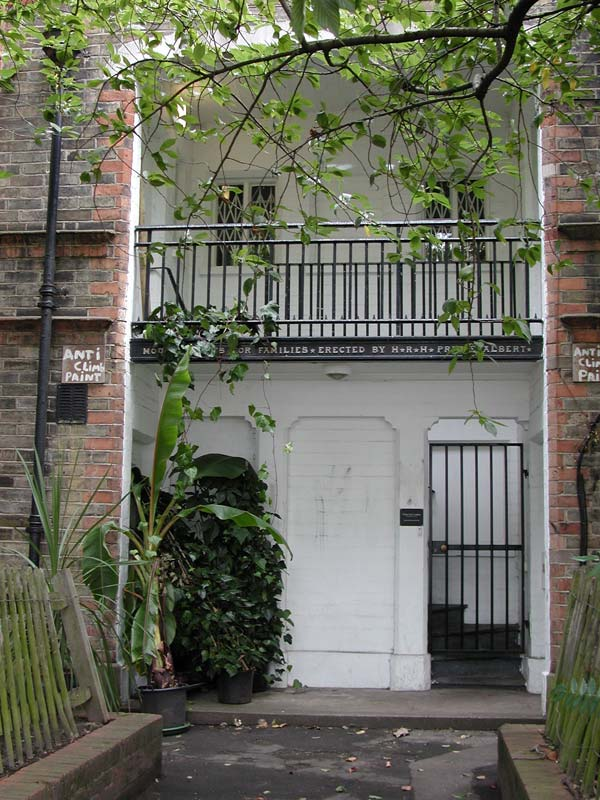
Prince Albert's Model Cottage was moved to the common in 1852

- 1853 Prince Consort Model Lodge (aka 'Prince Albert's Cottages') re-erected from the Great Exhibition (where they were provided by the Society for the Improvement of the Condition of the Labouring Classes) and back porch added. Architect: Henry Roberts.
- 1853 September The new toll house opens at the fork in Kennington Park Road.

== Kennington Park ==
=== 19th century ===
- 1854 Kennington Park opened and maintained by the Crown's Office of Works.
- 1859 Vauxhall Pleasure Gardens opened for the last time on the night of Monday, 25 July 1859.
- 1861 Two panelled gardens laid out by John Gibson on the west side to either side the lodge.
- 1861 A gymnasium erected (which became tennis courts before the children's playground moved there in 2006).
- 1861 Meeting of the Juvenile Temperance Society allowed in the summer. (PRO work 1/71)
- 1862 Felix Slade drinking water fountain designed by Charles Henry Driver. Slade donated this after feeling sorry for the local children who, after playing in the gymnasium, had been taking their refreshment from the cab horse trough.
- 1869 Sir Henry Doulton donates local artist George Tinworth's 'Fountain of Life'.
- 1874 Parish of St Agnes, Kennington Park founded.
- 1877 Church of St. Agnes, Kennington Park consecrated by the Lord Bishop of London.
- 1887 Kennington Park maintenance passed over to London's Metropolitan Board of Works.
- 1889 Kennington Park passed to London County Council that later became the Greater London Council, GLC, in 1965.
- 1896 A 7-year old Charlie Chaplin spent a day playing in the park after his mother discharged the family from the Lambeth Workhouse in desperation to see her children. After a day in the park and at a coffee-shop they returned to the workhouse to undergo the shameful admissions process again.
- 1897 An Arts & Crafts style refreshment house erected which is now a rare survival.
- 1898 Princess of Wales Theatre, designed by W. G. R. Sprague, opens at the height of the music hall era. (closed c. 1934 and site 'Compulsorily Purchased' for flats in 1949) The theatre had one of earliest air conditioning systems.
- 1899 The first all-night illuminated footpath through a public park.

=== 20th century ===
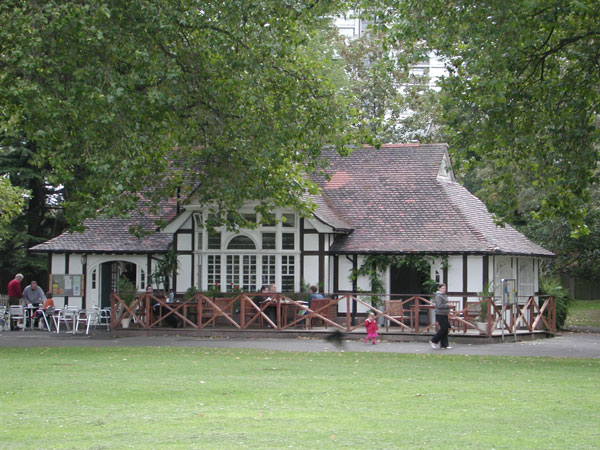
The Refreshment House, built in 1897

- 1900 Bandstand completed with seated concerts from military bands playing there until 1950 Sundays, Wednesdays and bank holidays – This was 'Rational Recreation' set against the vulgarity of the surrounding music hall and tavern culture. Charlie Chaplin grew up locally and is said to have met his first girlfriend in the park. His errant father habituated the Horns.
- 1902 An outdoor gymnasium for children was opened. The site is now the modern Fitness Trail
- 1914 c "The ancient privileges of the 'ton' are preserved, however, on a triangular piece of ground fenced off for the purpose (the site probably of the mound), where a notice states that here public meetings may be held." 'A tradition may neither be made nor destroyed' Benjamin Disraeli (from Prehistoric London: its mounds and circles, by E.O. Gordon Covenant Publishing 1914).
- 1914 c. The railings were removed for war use. The first bomb dropped on London in World War I is said to have been dropped from a Zeppelin on the south field.
- 1920 Kennington Park Extension Committee formed who bought land that became the swimming pool, flower garden and children's playground.
- 1924 War Memorial designed by Lucas Lancaster and Lodge erected (by public subscription?). It commemorated the casualties of the 24th Bn, The London Regiment, whose headquarters were in New Street, now Braganza Street.
- 1926 The park occupied during the General Strike.

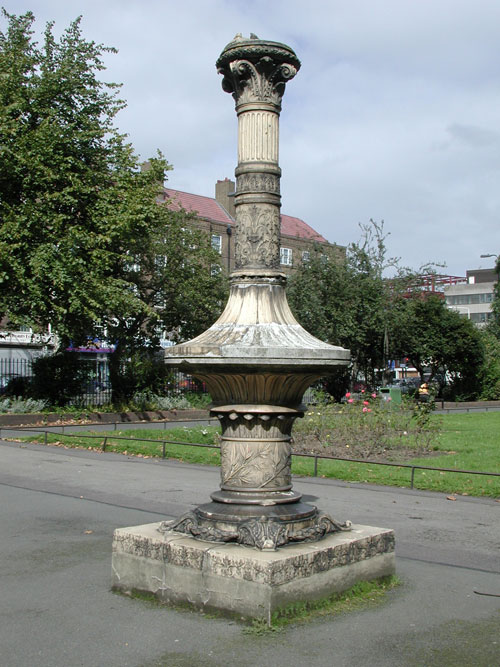
Tinworth Fountain, donated to the park by Henry Doulton in 1869

- 1930s Wooden shelter (replaced in the 1950s and repaired at the end of 2006).
- 1931 Old English Garden opened, based on the designs of Lt-Col J. J. Sexby.
- 1931 The Lido provided by the LCC was opened. (It closed at the end of the 1987 season – see external link below.)
- 1934 Last licence given to Princess of Wales Theatre.
- 1938 Architecturally bland Park Superintendent's house built in north east corner.
- 1940 The local areas of Lambeth and Southwark very heavily bombed in The Blitz.
- 1940 (15 October) A public trench-style bomb shelter dug as a grid of trenches in the field, known as the 'south pitch', suffers a direct hit during the Blitz. An estimated 104 people are killed. Only c. 50 bodies could be identified by name. Due to treacherous wet ground conditions, with the shelter walls collapsing on rescuers, the remains of up to another 54 local people were left in the ground, covered in lime, and the trenches were filled in.
- 1940 The north field of the Park used for allotments so people can grow their own food. (source: aerial photos taken by the Royal Air Force)
- 1944 (16 August) Horns pub was badly damaged by a flying bomb.
- 1947 Additional panels were added to the war memorial to commemorate World War II casualties.
- 1949 A 24 ft high illuminated Christmas tree erected in the park.

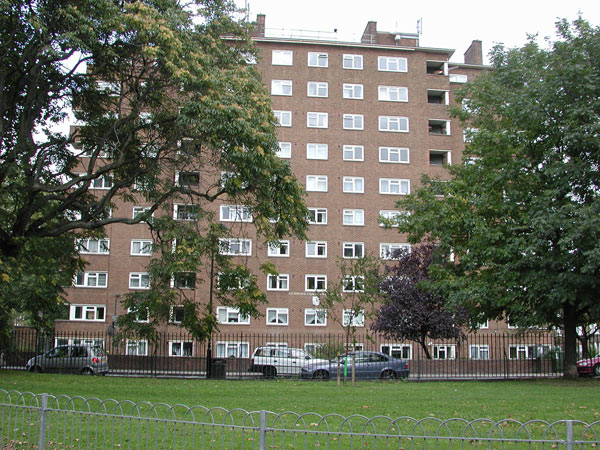
Kennington Park House – site of The Princess of Wales Theatre (see 1898)

- 1950s The Horns Tavern was 'one of the most famous landmarks of South London'. It is still remembered as being a centre of Kennington's community spirit in the 1950s.
- 1951 Eighteen acres of land to the east of the park were earmarked as an extension to the park.
- 1958 St. Agnes new parish church, designed by Ralph Covell (who was the parish organist), is consecrated by the Lord Bishop of Kingston. The old church designed by George Gilbert Scott was demolished in the 1940s following bombing by enemy action. John Betjeman, poet laureate, dedicated his first Collins Guide to the English Parish Church to the memory of St. Agnes Kennington Park, describing it as being "...destroyed by the diocese of Southwark after some war damage."
- 1960s Horns public house demolished (later replaced by Richard Seifert's Department of Social Security building – see photo)
- 196? Land to the east of St. Agnes Place is designated public open space that becomes Kennington Park East.
- 1963 Two piece bronze Reclining Figure No. 3 by sculptor Henry Moore bought for the new prizewinning Brandon High rise Estate, Southwark (adjacent to Kennington Park East).
- 1965 A scene from the film The Ipcress File was filmed in Kennington Park. It shows the park bandstand (the concrete area in front of Prince Consort Lodge)where the Irish Guards are playing a concert, rows of chairs are laid out in front of the raised stage. The bandstand burnt down several years later.
- 1971 Control of the park passes from the Greater London Council to Lambeth Council.
- c1976 Radical religion returns to Kennington Park with the establishment of the Rastafarian Temple in St. Agnes Place backing onto the park.
- 1974 St. Agnes Place housing squatted and defended against demolition (1977) with a high court injunction, the first to be obtained by telephone.
- 1977 Bob Marley visits the Rastafarian Temple frequently whilst recording his record Exodus in London. He also enjoyed playing football with friends in the park.
- 1978 The Kennington Skateboarding Bowl was erected on the site of derelict netball courts.
- 1978 (November) Public gatherings return to the park with a municipal firework display and bonfire.
- 1981 Lambeth Fightback Campaign used the park as an assembly point. This was the first recorded use of the park for a political gathering since the enclosure.
- 1984 Oval Fountain designed by landscape architect Georgina Livingston.

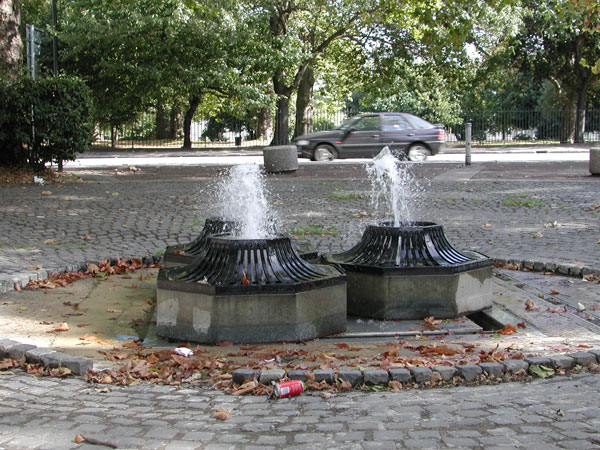
Oval Fountain – site of public hangings until 1800

- 1986 Gay Pride march started in Kennington Park, followed in the next ten years by many political rallies.
- 1988 The much loved but neglected swimming pool is closed, filled in and replaced with tennis courts.
- 1990 A branch of the historic Poll Tax march starts in the park.
- 1996 KP Management Advisory Committee (the MAC) started by Lambeth Council prepares lottery bid with the architect Carl Callaghan.
- 1997 A 16-page pamphlet on the park's history from a working-class viewpoint written and published by Stefan Szczelkun. In the following year, it sells over 1,000 copies in local newsagents and bookshops.
- 1998 The 150th anniversary of the Chartist rally was commemorated with banners, song and a play, by latter-day Chartists organised by Maryanne Gordon and Louisa Hillier.
- 1998 Reclaim the Streets and Liverpool Dockers March rally sets off from the park.

=== 21st century ===
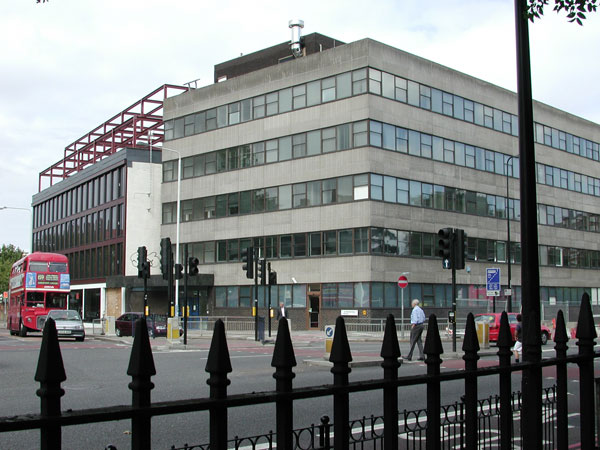
Department of Social Security, built in the 1960s on the site of The Horns Tavern

- 2001 Last municipal fireworks display.
- 2002 July Park Arts event. 12 artists install work in the park for the day.
- 2002 Inaugural meeting of Friends of Kennington Park (FoKP). Their formation was a reaction to concern for the current condition and upkeep of the park, which was very poor. The cafe was closed, and in disrepair, before reopening later in the year.
- 2002 Organised cricket returns to Kennington Park with Tony Moody's inner-city cricket project. Kennington United CC is financially supported by Surrey CCC, based nearby at The Oval and receives coaching from professional players.
- 2002 '15 Storeys High', a comedy TV series set in the Brandon Estate flats adjacent to the park, is broadcast in the UK. It is now considered a classic.
- 2003 Lambeth council get eviction order against St. Agnes Place.
- 2003 First memorial service at St. Mark's for those who died in the park bomb shelter in 1940.
- 2003 The tree planting charity, Trees for London (later Trees for Cities) moves into Prince Consort Lodge.
- 2004 A march to start the Cannabis Festival in Brockwell Park started from Kennington Park.

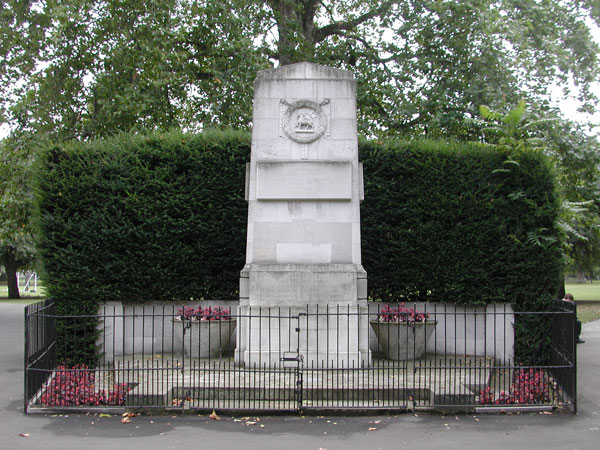
War Memorial, unveiled in 1924

- 2004 cJune Lambeth Council posters announce illegality of ad hoc barbecues in the park.
- 2004 The public toilets are reopened.
- 2004 July Jumble sale organised by Cathy Preece raises over £700 for park bird boxes made by local community eco group Roots & Shoots.
- 2004 August An Ecuadorian community group are excluded from using the park for volleyball Ecua-volley, after complaints over public health matters are received by the council.
- 2004 Commemoration of the 150th anniversary of the park with a funday organised by the Friends of Kennington Park group.
- 2004 October 'SaveKPVolleyball' campaign group sends an open letter to Lambeth Council defending the use of the park for Ecuadorian community volleyball. But volleyball continues to be excluded.
- 2004 November/December Birdboxes are installed by Roots & Shoots, as reported in South London Press Friday, 3 December 2004
- 2005 Community Planting Day in Kennington Park east, to define the boundary of the new cricket pitch. Young cricketers and other local volunteers do the planting including fifteen Lime trees. Trees for Cities with Friends of KP.
- 2005 Riot police evict the squatters in St. Agnes Place adjoining the park. The Rastafarian Temple is temporarily spared. Demolition of all the houses follows.
- 2006 Kennington United Cricket Club play their first formal at home game at Kennington Park against Temple Bar. TB batted first, 169 all out. KUCC won 173 to 6.
- 2006 A memorial is unveiled to victims of Blitz entombed in the park shelter. Designed by sculptor Richard Kindersley, it takes the form of a rough slab of Caithness stone, and bears the dedication: To commemorate the wartime suffering of the people of Kennington and in particular over 50 men, women and children who were killed on 15 October 1940 when a bomb destroyed an air-raid shelter near this spot. Rest in peace. It also bears an inscription from poet Maya Angelou: History despite its wrenching pain cannot be unlived but if faced with courage need not be lived again.
- 2006 saw the construction of a new fitness course, new playground and other improvements.
- 2007 The Archbishop of Canterbury was amongst the speakers at an outdoor service to commemorate the passing of the Slave Trade Act 1807. There had been a march from Holy Trinity, Clapham Common to Kennington Park
- 2007 The Rastafarian Temple on St. Agnes Place was raided by 60 armed police, with about 150 other officers as back-up, after it had been taken over by drug dealers. 23 people were arrested, although only three people were charged, and no class A drugs were found. The Ethiopian World Federation was awarded over £8,000 of costs from the police. However, by 21 May demolition was underway.
- 2008 A new children's playground opens in the park after a fundraising campaign led by FOKP
- 2010 the 70th anniversary of Kennington Park's air raid shelter tragedy is commemorated
- 2011 The Park is awarded a Green Flag – a national award that recognises the best green spaces in the country.
- 2012 Park Masterplan drawn up
- 2014 Kennington Park receives a grant of £374,000 from the Heritage Lottery Fund for the restoration of the 1930s Flower Garden. This was a joint project between Lambeth Council and FOKP.
- 2014 July re-dedication of the park's war memorial on the 90th anniversary of its unveiling.
- 2015 The Midnight Path is widened and straightened with money from Transport for London. In July the restored Flower Garden is officially opened. New fitness equipment is installed on the park's fitness trail.
- 2016 Monthly volunteer gardening sessions in the park funded by the HLF project monies. The restored Flower Garden is a prize winner in various awards – Civic Trust London Regional Finalist; London in Bloom Silver Gilt; Landscape Institute Highly Recommended; Bali Award (British Association of Landscape Architects). The fifth year the park gains a Green Flag.
- 2017 Monthly volunteer gardening sessions; fruit trees planted and raised lavender bed installed on the Green Link
