= Cleaver Square =

Garden square in London

Coordinates: 51°29′16″N 0°06′31″W

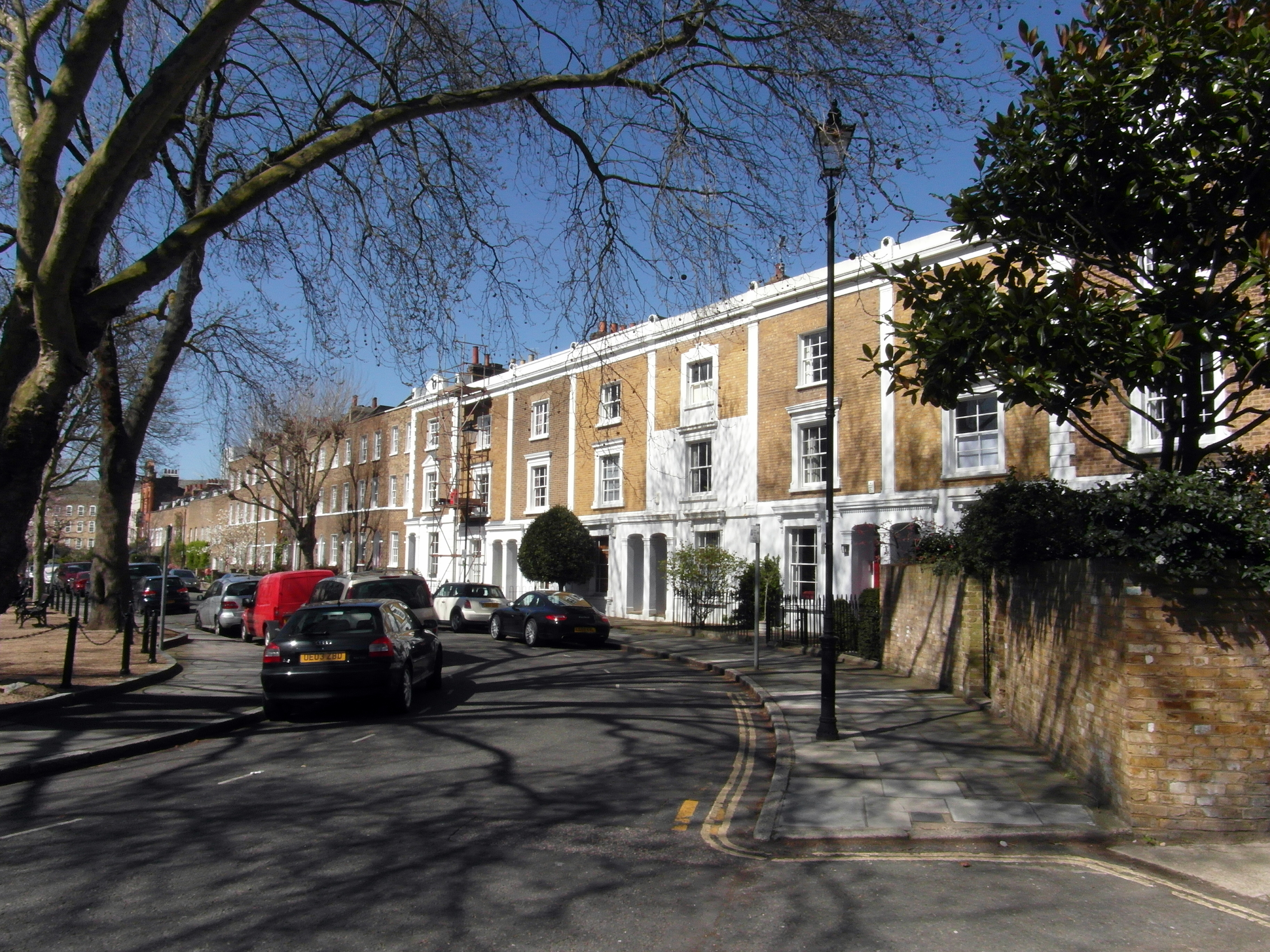
Cleaver Square

Cleaver Square (formerly Prince's Square) is an 18th-century garden square in the London Borough of Lambeth, dating from 1789. It is notable for having been the first garden square in South London.

== History ==
Cleaver Square was laid out in 1789, and was the first garden square in South London.

== Features ==
There is a residents' association, which hosts an annual outdoor carol service and other events.

Until the middle of the 18th century, the locality consisted of hedgerows, fields and meadows, traversed by Kennington Road from the City to Clapham. Mary Cleaver inherited the estate in 1743; at that point it consisted of a large open pasture, screened from the high road by a line of trees and known as White Bear Field. In 1780 she leased it to Thomas Ellis, the landlord of the Horns Tavern on Kennington Common, who laid out and developed the square. The terraces at the entrance of Kennington Park Road were built in 1788, houses on the north west side of the square in 1789, followed by other houses on the north side in 1792. Other houses were built later, between 1815 and 1824, and 1844 and 1853. By the 1870s the area had reduced in status, and the houses were overcrowded. Originally named Prince's Square, it was renamed Cleaver Square in 1937.

The centre of the square was enclosed by Ellis in 1792 as a grazing ground. By 1871 it was a garden circumscribed by a formal path, and by 1898 it had been cultivated as a nursery with greenhouses. The centre of the square was acquired by the Metropolitan Borough of Lambeth in 1927 in order to prevent development on it. From 1995 the centre of the square was restored as a public space with a grant from the Metropolitan Public Gardens Association.

Cleaver Square is within the Kennington Conservation Area, which was first designated in 1968 and extended in 1979 and 1997. It is a registered historic square. Many but not all, of the houses on the square are Grade II listed. Those that are listed are 1-20; 21–25; 26–33; 34–41; and 50, 51 and 52.

== Features ==
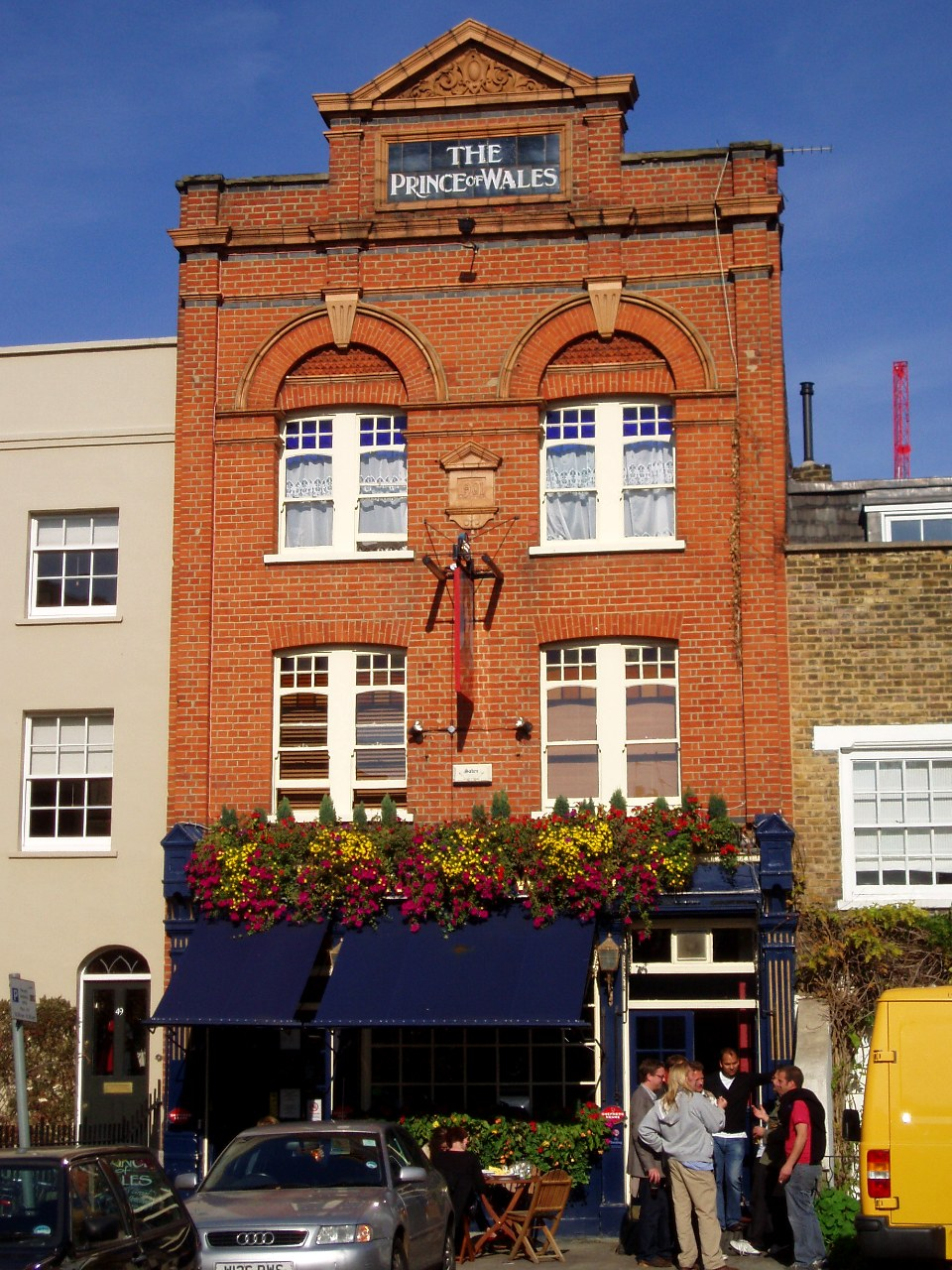
The Prince of Wales on Cleaver Square

There is a residents' association, which hosts an annual outdoor carol service and other events.

To the south-east, the square is bordered with the City and Guilds of London Art School (formerly the Lambeth School of Art).

In the north-west corner is the Prince of Wales public house, dating originally from 1792 but refaced in 1901. A Shepherd Neame tied house until 2019, the Prince of Wales is now a free house. It has pétanque sets available for hire, for use in the gravelled centre of the square.

== Notable residents ==
Notable residents have included the artist Innes Fripp, the Tate & Lyle businessman Sir Saxon Tate Bt, and former Prime Minister, Sir John Major.

== Cultural references ==
- Patrick McGrath's 2021 novel Last Days in Cleaver Square (2021: Hutchinson) is about the end of life of a resident of the square.
- Peter Snow's 1988 oil painting Cleaver Square from Kennington Park Road is held by Southwark Art Collection. His 1985 oil painting, The Passing World, from a similar perspective, is held by the Museum of London.
