= St Agnes, Kennington Park =

Coordinates: 51.48333°N 0.10702°W

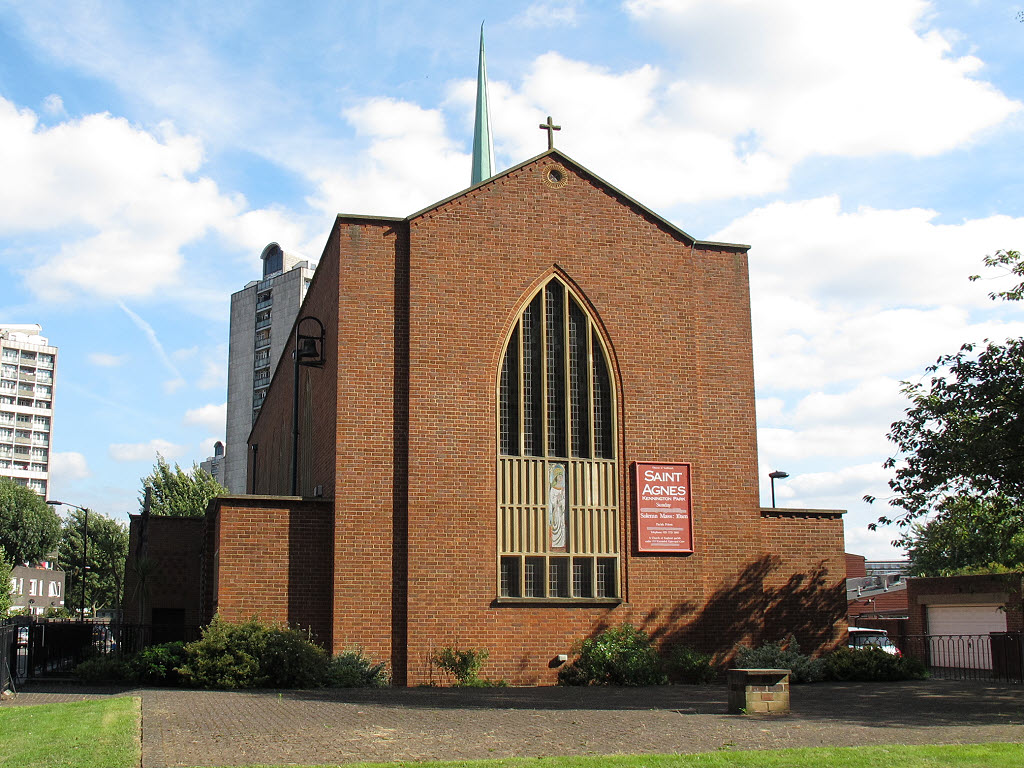
St Agnes, Kennington Park

St Agnes, Kennington Park, is an Anglo-Catholic church in south London in the Diocese of Southwark, though it is under the episcopal oversight of the Bishop of Fulham. The church is situated in the Borough of Southwark placed behind Kennington Park and near the Oval Cricket Ground. The nearest tube stations are Kennington and Oval.

The first church on this site was designed by George Gilbert Scott Jr. and could seat 1,000 people. The church was bombed during World War II and rebuilt by Halliday and Greenwood, to a design by Ralph Covell, in 1956.

== Architecture ==
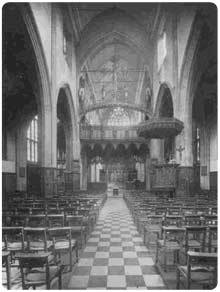
The original building at St Agnes Place

The original building started construction in 1875 in a Neo-Gothic building by George Gilbert Scott Jr., who also worked on three of the Cambridge colleges. "The fittings of the present church are from the old, including the triptych reredos by Temple Moore said to be based on the golden reredos in the Church of Our Lady, Oberwesel in Rhineland-Palatinate, Germany". The current church houses a baptistry under the west gallery and organ loft, a Lady Chapel in the north-east side, an office and meeting space along with a church hall, all contained within a small churchyard. The main body of the church includes a nave and chancel under a continuous pitched roof.

== Worship ==
St Agnes is a Church of England parish church in which worship follows the Catholic tradition. Mass is celebrated every weekday - except Wednesdays and Saturdays - in the Lady Chapel at 10 am, with weekly Sunday Solemn Mass and Feast days.

== Music ==
St Agnes houses four instruments, including a two-manual choir organ built by N.P. Mander between 1960 and 1961 which is situated in the organ loft. There is also a harmonium from 1903 in the Lady Chapel that is used for Festal services and during Christmas.

In May 2018, a new four-manual nave organ using a Hauptwerk set-up was installed. It includes 67 stops and thumb pistons on each division. From 2015 to 2021, the director of music at St Agnes was the composer and organist Matt Geer.

== Clergy ==
Fr. Robert Wright was inducted as the Vicar at St Agnes, Kennington Park in April 2023. The honorary Assistant Priest is Fr Simon Acland, son of the New Zealand National Party politician Sir Jack Acland.
