= ArtsLav =

Former arts venue in Kennington, London

Coordinates: 51.488911°N 0.111038°W

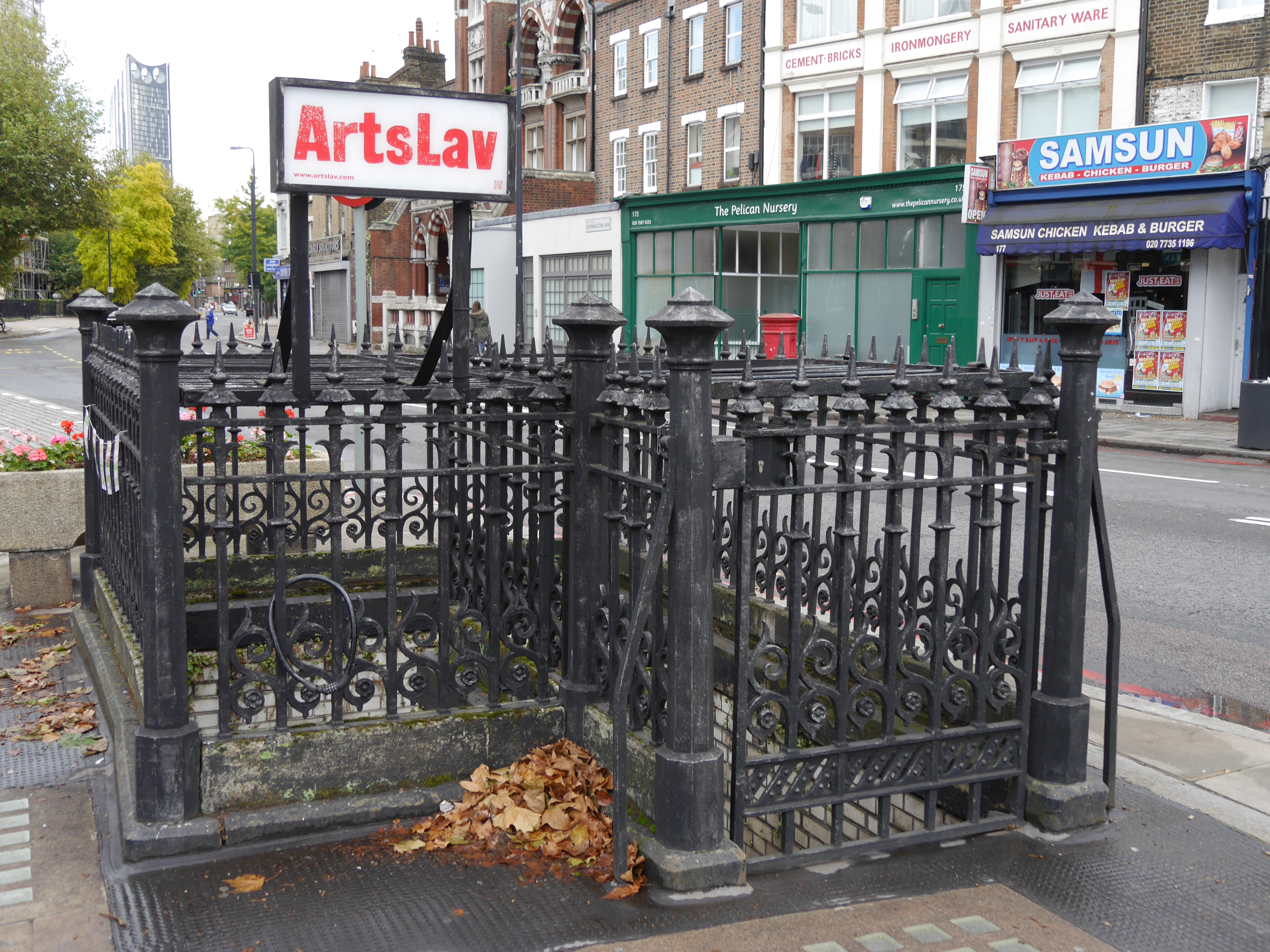
ArtsLav, Kennington Cross, 2014

ArtsLav was an arts venue located at Kennington Cross in Kennington, London, England. It started life as an underground Victorian gentlemen's public lavatory. It is now a listed and restored Kennington landmark used as a community arts facility, Artslav. Engineered by B. Finch and Co. in 1898. It went out of commission in 1988 during a period of public convenience closures in Lambeth.

Original features included marble urinals, three cubicles, a glass water tank, a mosaic floor from the 1960s, an attendant's booth, a ventilator shaft and horse trough.

== History ==
Charlie Chaplin is thought to have used the lavatory during his childhood, and writes about sitting nearby when locked out of his home.

The lavatory was featured on Disappearing London in January 2006, an ITV programme that highlighted endangered London landmarks. After campaigning, led by Celia Stothard a local resident, and extensive fundraising, fundamental repairs were carried out with electricity and water being re-installed in 2013.

From 2013 until 2017, it functioned as a local community arts centre and a base for community employment projects. It became a Community Interest Company run by local residents and artists.

In 2018, the local authority leased the structure to a commercial wine bar group, Bermondsey Arts Club.

== Features ==
In 2001, Lambeth Council described it as containing the following features of architectural and historical interest:

- A fine stone cattle trough erected by the Metropolitan Drinking Trough Association in the 19th century (c.1880) – supported on four sturdy stone pillars.
- Elegant black painted cast iron railings enclosing the stairway down to the former public lavatory beneath.
- An imposing ventilation pipe over 6 meters in height – also of cast iron, mounted on a substantial black painted metal plinth.

It has been Grade II listed since October 2001.
