= Walcot Square =

Garden square in London, England

Coordinates: 51°29′39″N 0°06′33″W

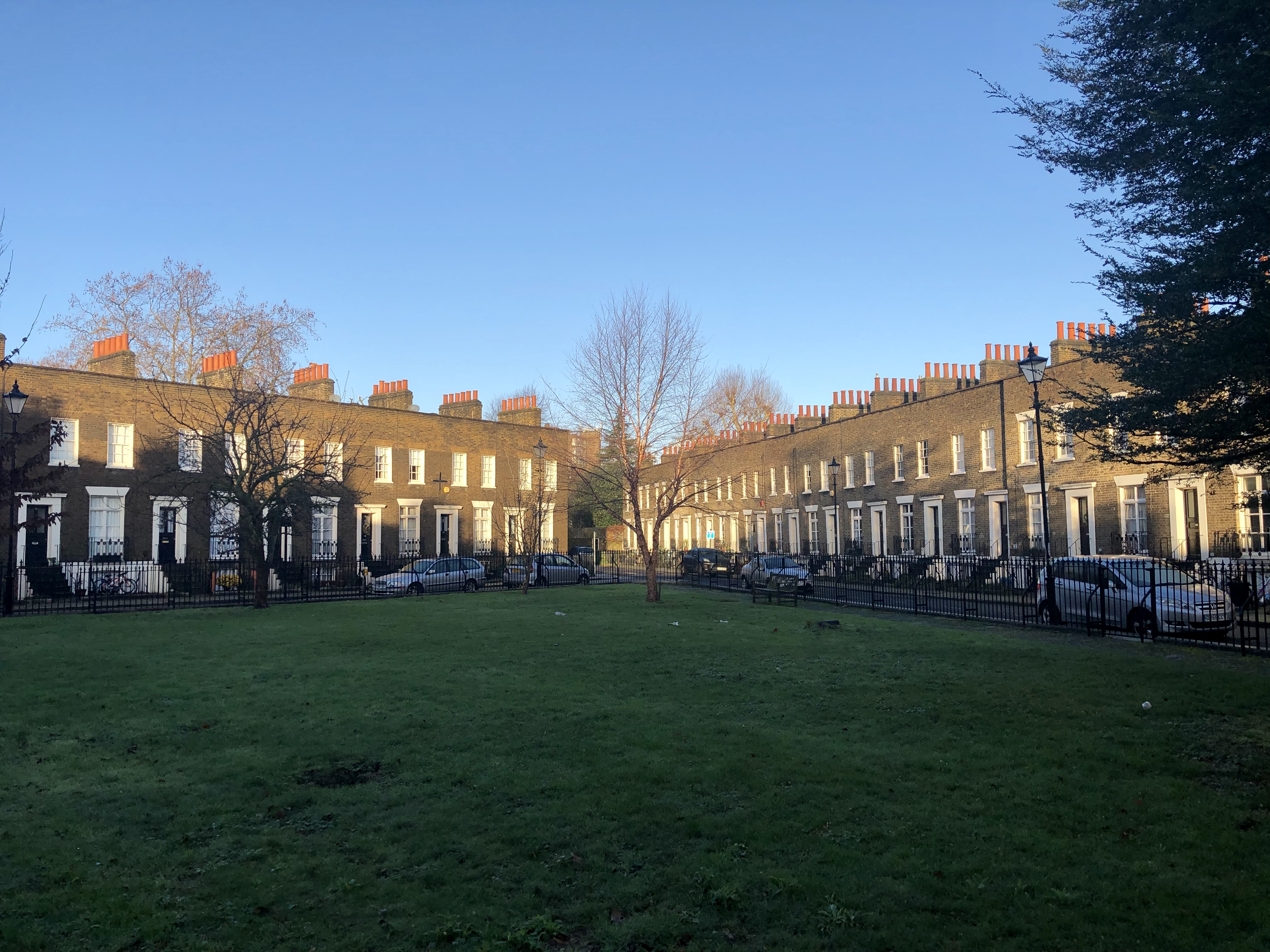
Walcot Square

Walcot Square is an 18th-century garden triangle in Central London. The "square" is in the London Borough of Lambeth and has a very rare triangular shape. Since 1968 in planning policy it is a Conservation Area. Three rows of houses front its communal green, granted Grade II listed status under the statutory protective and recognition scheme in 1981 (the mainstream and initial category).

== Location and layout ==
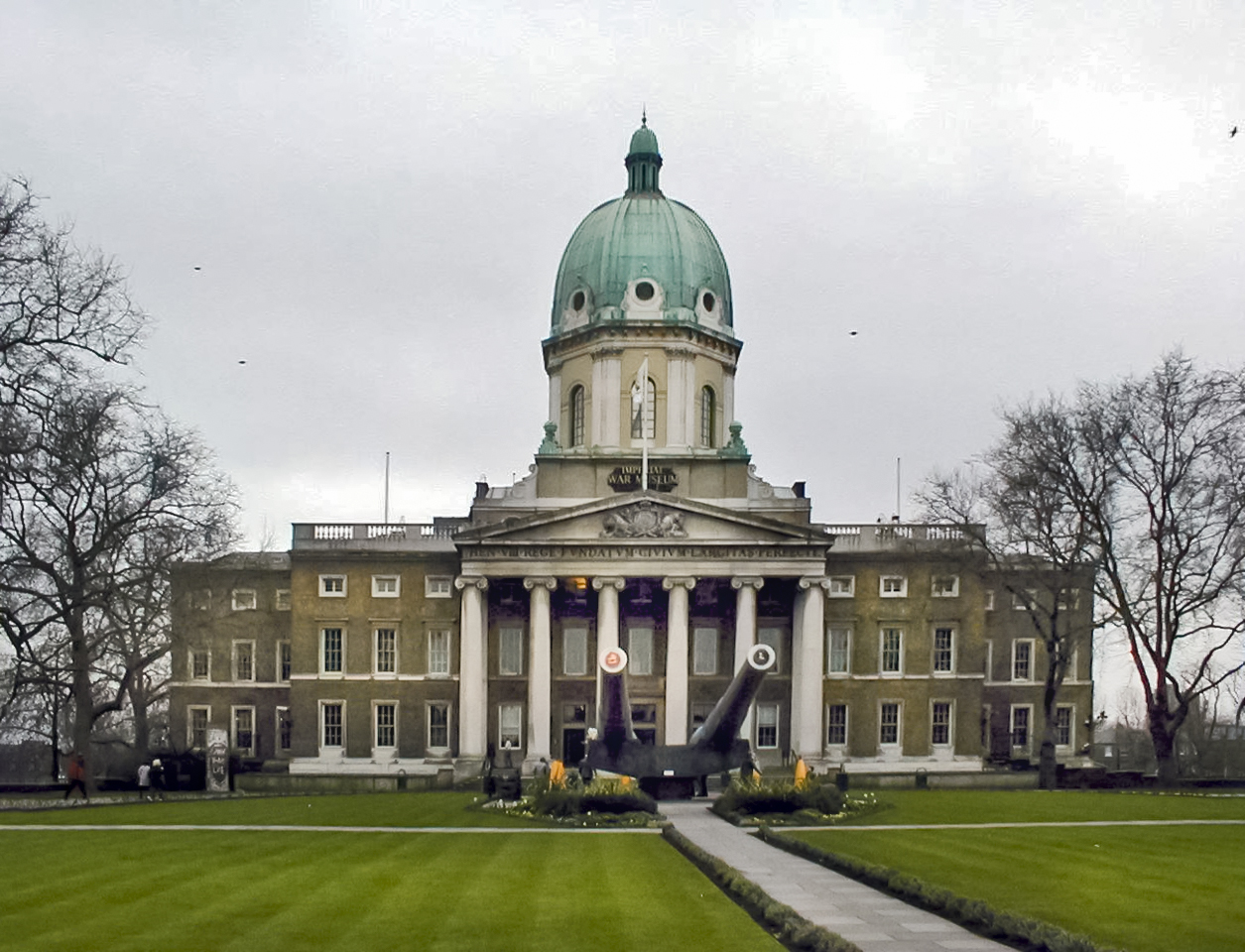
The Imperial War Museum, by Walcot Square.

North of a double row of homes with gardens, Brook Street, is Geraldine Mary Harmsworth Park in which stand Imperial War Museum and two cafes (on the site of a mental-health hospital). To the south is St Mary's Gardens, to the west an avenue, Kennington Road, and east is West Square.

The communal-green-centred street is in the SE11 postcode district. The nearest tube station is Lambeth North, 500 m north.

The late Georgian three-storey terraced houses, forming its stock (some of which due to slightly raised-above subterranean-only level basements), surround a private 0.2-acre (0.081 ha) communal garden, owned and maintained by the Walcot Foundation. No No.1 nor 64 exist; the highest of sets being the sole addition number, 68A, (on the evens sides of the estate) or 95 (odds side of the estate).

== History ==
The street is named after Edmund Walcott, a haberdasher, who bequeathed the 30 acres (12 ha) on his death, in 1667, in trust for the poor of St. Mary, Lambeth, and St Olave's Church, Southwark.

Each of the three terraced sides differ slightly in design but are all constructed from stock brick and stucco which contributes to the modestly formal domestic scene. Notable features include stucco door surrounds, black painted doors, and long casement windows with ornamental anthemion cast iron balconette and railings. No. s9–81 (odds) were built by John Woodward; 16–24 (evens) by Charles Newnham; and 26–50 (evens) by John Chapman.

== London Blitz ==
As with the rest of London, incendiary bombs hit some of the street in the London Blitz in World War II. Where buildings were destroyed comparatively new ones were put up to match the originals.

== Notable residents ==
- William Henry Jones (1817–1885)– vicar of Bradford-on-Avon, occupied No. 19 (ex-No. 60).
- William Hosking (1800–1861), architect and civil engineer, occupied No. 20 (ex-No. 4) From 1840 to 1841. Engineer to the West London Railway he designed Trinity Chapel in Poplar and claimed to have designed the Reading Room in the British Museum. He also held a professorship at King's College, London.
- Thomas Barnes (1785–1841), editor of The Times occupied No. 77 (ex No. 31).

== Film and literature ==
- In Bleak House, by Charles Dickens and published in 1853, Mr Guppy, the law clerk, proposes to Esther and states he has taken a residence on Walcot Square
- Walcot Stores, on the corner of the street, features in scenes from the 1990 film The Krays
- Scenes from the 2014 film The Woman in Black: Angel of Death were filmed on the square.
- Scenes for the 2016 film Fantastic Beasts and Where to Find Them, and the 2018 sequel Fantastic Beasts: The Crimes of Grindelwald were filmed on the square. The neighbouring St Mary's Gardens is the home of Newt Scamander.
- Walcot Square was the location of a number of scenes in The Electrical Life of Louis Wain, the 2022 film biopic of surrealist painter Louis Wain.
