= Felix Slade =

English lawyer and collector

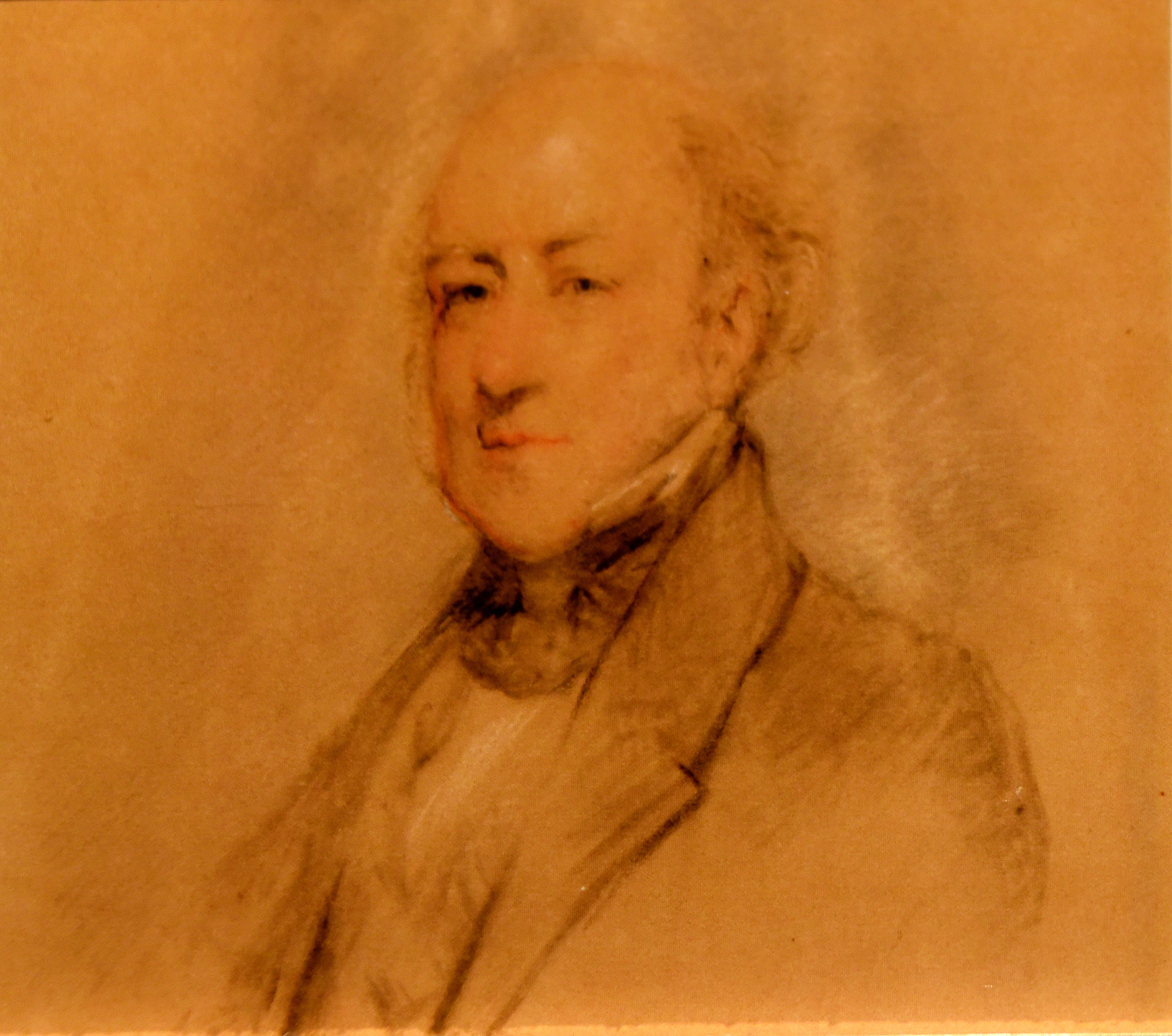
Portrait of Slade, c. 1851, by Margaret Sarah Carpenter

Felix Joseph Slade FSA (6 August 1788 – 29 March 1868) was an English lawyer and collector of glass, books and prints.

A fellow of the Society of Antiquaries (1866) and a philanthropist who endowed three Slade Professorships of Fine Art at the University of Oxford and Cambridge University, and at University College London, where he also endowed scholarships which formed the beginning of the Slade School of Art (founded 1871) in London, whose Director holds the Slade Professorship. The bequest was also indirectly responsible for the foundation of the Ruskin School of Drawing in Oxford, which was financed by the first Oxford Professor, John Ruskin, who announced his intention in his inaugural lecture "to the general dismay of his listeners."

The Oxford and Cambridge professorships are visiting ones, who give the Slade Lectures, one of the most prestigious series of lectures on the history of art, which are commonly published. The first Slade Professors were John Ruskin, at Oxford, and Matthew Digby Wyatt at Cambridge; Edward Poynter. gave the first lecture on 2 October 1871 at University College, London.

He was the son of Robert Slade, a Surrey landowner and proctor in Doctors' Commons, who eventually became deputy lieutenant for Surrey, and his wife Eliza Foxcroft of Halsteads (near Thornton-in-Lonsdale, Yorkshire). From his father he inherited a considerable fortune, which supported his purchases of books and prints. He lived with his bachelor brother Henry in the family house in Walcot Place (in the Kennington area of London) and built up a valuable collection of historical glass. When he died unmarried he left a fortune of £160,000 and bequeathed the bulk of his art collection to the British Museum; the books are now in the British Library. One of the features of the book collection includes twenty-five bindings from the sixteenth, seventeenth, and eighteenth centuries, representing English, French, and Italian styles. £35,000 was specified for the endowment of art professorships, to be known as Slade Professorships, at Oxford, Cambridge, and University College, London. University College received the additional bequest of six art scholarships for students, the nucleus of the Slade School of Art.

He meticulously catalogued his collection of glass, which was published in 1869 and 1871.

Slade was the subject of a portrait in coloured chalk by Margaret Sarah Carpenter.
