= St Mary's Gardens =

Garden triangle in London

Coordinates: 51°29′36″N 0°06′33″W

St Mary's Gardens is an 18th-century garden triangle in Central London. The "square" is in the London Borough of Lambeth and has an unusual triangular shape. Since 1968 in planning policy it is a Conservation Area. Three rows of houses front its communal green, granted Grade II listed status under the statutory protective and recognition scheme in 1981 (the mainstream and initial category).

== Location and layout ==
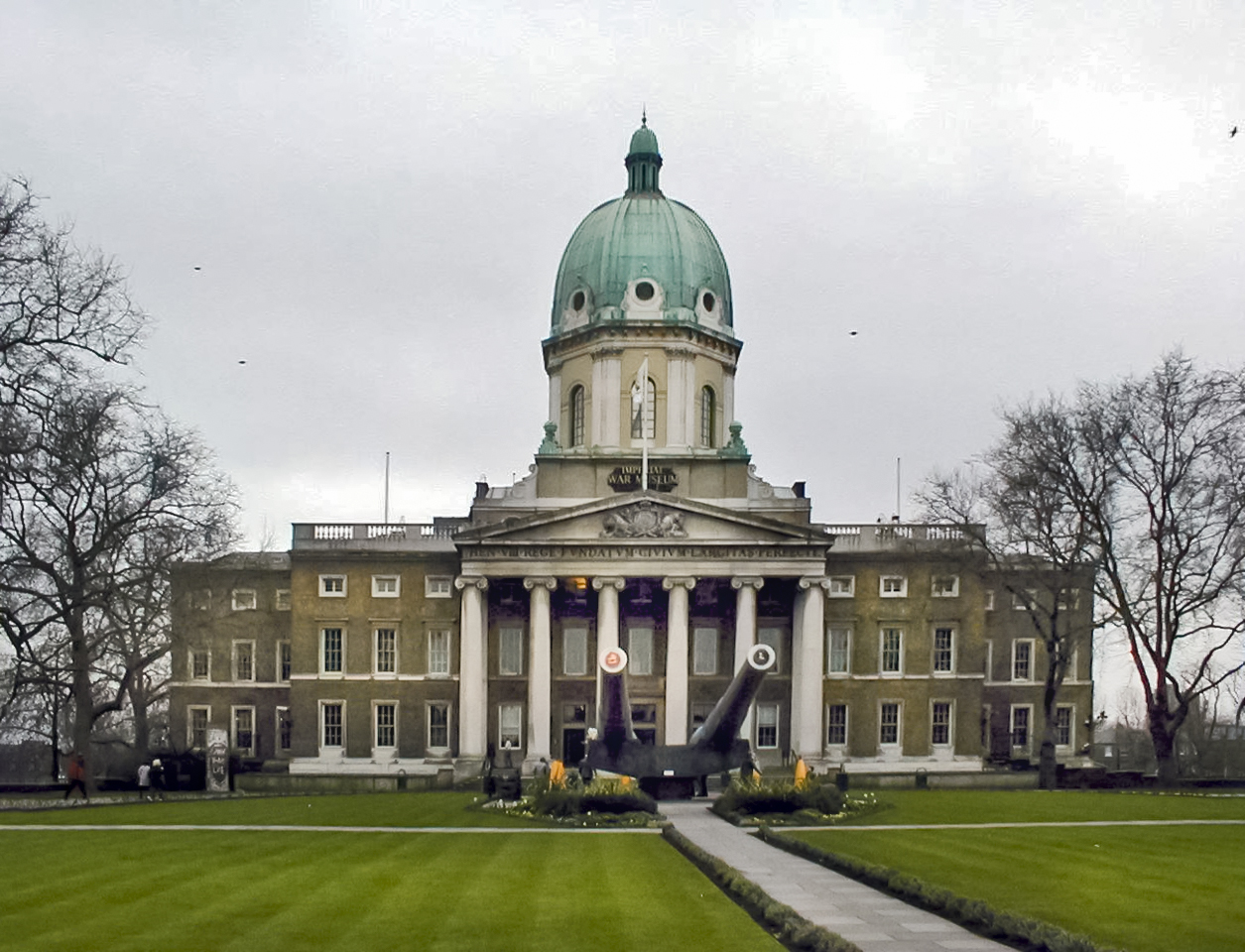
The Imperial War Museum, by Walcot Square.

To the north is Walcot Square and Geraldine Mary Harmsworth Park in which stand Imperial War Museum and two cafes (on the site of a mental-health hospital). To the west an avenue, Kennington Road, and east is West Square.

The communal-green-centred street is in the SE11 postcode district. The nearest tube station is Lambeth North, 500 m north.

The late Georgian three-storey terraced houses, forming its stock (some of which due to slightly raised-above subterranean-only level basements), surround a private 0.2-acre (0.081 ha) communal garden, owned and maintained by the Walcot Foundation.

== History ==
Edmund Walcott, a haberdasher bequeathed the 30 acres (12 ha) on his death, in 1667, in trust for the poor of St. Mary, Lambeth, and St Olave's Church, Southwark.

In 1713 the estate was partitioned between the two parishes in order that it might be developed more conveniently. With St. Mary's taking the northeastern and St. Olave's the south-western portion. In 1750–51, when the New (Kennington) Road was laid out, St. Olave's and St. Mary's parishes both sold land to the Turnpike Trustees, St. Mary's retaining part of the land on the west side of the road and St. Olave's a tiny triangular piece of land on the east side.

In 1815 it was found necessary to make a further partition of the estate, since in its development two houses (Nos. 112 and 114 Kennington Road) had been built half on St. Olave's and half on St. Mary's land. The triangular piece of land to the west of Kennington Road was given to St. Mary's parish and an adjustment was made in the boundaries on the other side of the road.

== Film and literature ==
- Scenes for the 2016 film Fantastic Beasts and Where to Find Them (film), and the 2018 sequel Fantastic Beasts: The Crimes of Grindelwald were filmed on the square. St Mary's Gardens is the home of Newt Scamander.
- St Mary's Gardens was the location of a number of scenes featured in crime drama Trigger Point.
