= Kennington Park Road =

Street in south London

Coordinates: 51°29′12″N 0°06′27″W

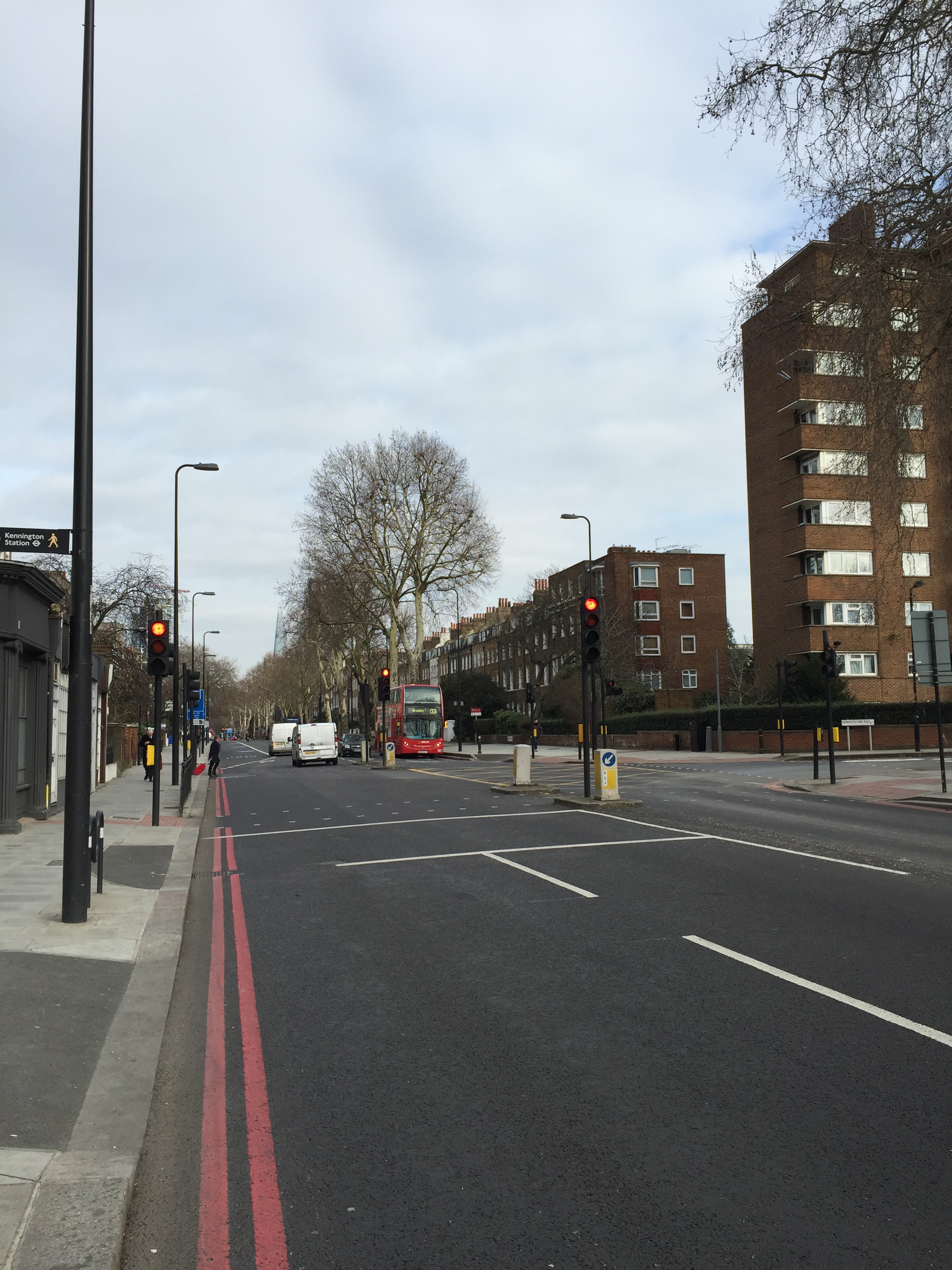
Facing North. February 2016

Kennington Park Road is a main road in south-east London, England, and is part of the A3 trunk road. It runs from Newington Butts at its Y-junction with Kennington Lane, south-west to the Oval, where the A3 continues as Clapham Road, towards Stockwell. At this crossroads junction, Camberwell New Road and Kennington Oval head towards Camberwell Green and Vauxhall respectively.

Heading south, the street first passes Kennington station and then Kennington Park.

It is part of the Roman Stane Street, from London to Chichester.

It should not be confused with Kensington Park Road, a street in the west London district of Notting Hill.

== Places of interest ==
The Street has been home to the City and Guilds of London Art School (formerly Lambeth School of Art) since 1879.
