= Lambeth Marsh =

Coordinates: 51.50434°N 0.11283°W

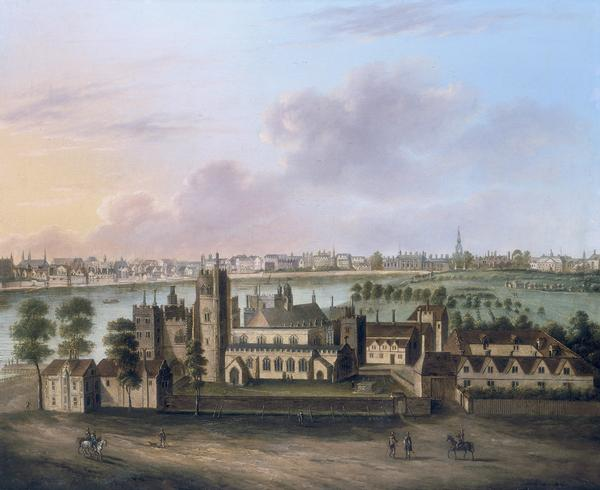
Lambeth Palace with Lambeth Marsh behind it, c. 1685

Lambeth Marsh (also Lower Marsh and Lambeth Marshe) is one of the oldest settlements on the South Bank of London, England.

Until the early 19th century much of north Lambeth (now known as the South Bank) was mostly marsh. The settlement of Lambeth Marsh was built on a raised through road over the marsh lands, potentially dating back to Roman times. The land on which it stands was owned by the church of England, with Lambeth Palace nearby. Records and maps show that it was a separate village until the early 19th century when the church sold off the land in small pockets, thereby leading to sporadic development of individual houses rather than the grander redevelopments occurring north of the river.

The northern tip of the ancient parish of Lambeth was a marshland known as Lambeth Marshe, but it was drained in the 18th century and is remembered in the Lower Marsh street name. Sometime after the opening of Waterloo railway station in 1848 the locality around the station and Lower Marsh became known as Waterloo. Lower Marsh street in the Waterloo neighbourhood of London was named after the nearby Lower Marsh. It is the location of Lower Marsh Market.

== History ==
=== Early records ===
At a very early date, probably dating to the original Roman settlements, banks of earth were erected along the south side of the Thames to keep out the tidal waters and to hold them in check. One of them near the river was called Narrow Wall whilst another binding the marsh to the east was called Broad Wall, an ancient raised road which followed the line of Lambeth Marsh.

- Domesday Book entry

One of the first records of the area is recorded in the Domesday Book, referring to the local manor closest to London (Water Lambeth & Lambeth Marsh):

There is a manor of St Mary's which is called Lambeth. Countess Gode, sister of King Edward, held it. It was then assessed at ten hides; now at two and a half hides. There is tand for two and a half ploughs. In demesne are two ploughs, twelve villeins and 27 bordars with four ploughs. There is a church, and 19 burgesses in London who pay 36/-, and there are three slaves and 16 acres (65,000 m^{2}) of meadow and woodland for three pigs.

There is no mention of Vauxhall in the 1086 Domesday Book. The area originally formed part of the extensive Manor of South Lambeth, which was held by the de Redvers family. Falkes de Breauté acquired it in 1216 when he married Margaret, widow of Baldwin de Redvers; de Breauté's lands reverted to the de Redvers family after his death in 1226. In 1293 South Lambeth Manor and the Manor of "la Sale Faukes" passed, probably by trickery, to Edward I. In 1317 King Edward II granted the manor of Vauxhall, Surrey, to Sir Roger d'Amory for his "good services" at the Battle of Bannockburn.

London circa 1300, showing "Lambethmoor"

From various accounts, three local roads – the South Lambeth Road, Clapham Road (previously Merton Road) and Wandsworth Road (previously Kingston Road) – were ancient and well-known routes to and from London.

- 17th century

...and away to Westminster Hall, and there sight of Mrs Lane, and plotted with her to go over to the old house in Lambeth Marsh, and there eat and drank, and had my pleasure with her twice, she being the strangest woman in talk of love to her husband sometimes, and sometimes again she do not care for him, and yet willing enough to allow me a liberty of doing what I would with her. So spending 5s or 6s upon her, I could do what I would, and after an hours stay and more, back again and set her ashore again.
Samuel Pepys 25th July 1664.

- 18th century —

Mark Beaufoy's Vinegar Yard was established in the 1750s in Cupers Gardens and extended in 1763.

In 1779 William Curtis established his London Botanical Garden on the site of the present-day Mitre Road and Ufford Street, to the south of The Cut.

As the Horwood Map of 1799 shows, by the end of the 18th century Lambeth Marsh was still a predominantly rural area, with people maintaining market gardens.

=== 19th-century Lambeth Marsh ===
Until the beginning of the 19th century Lambeth Marsh was surrounded by open fields, and a windmill in the cut. The land around Vauxhall was flat, partly marshy and poorly drained by ditches, and only started to be developed with the draining of Lambeth Marsh in the mid-18th century, but remained a village. Prior to this it provided market garden produce for the nearby City of London. Lower Marsh Market is a street market adjacent to Waterloo station in the London Borough of Lambeth. Lower Marsh and The Cut formed the commercial heart of the area from the early 19th century. The street market then established has operated almost continuously since this time. At its peak, the market stretched from Blackfriars to Vauxhall. The building of Waterloo station in 1848 and its subsequent expansion cut the street off from the riverside, and created a number of yards and cul de sacs from former streets. These fragments exist alongside surviving courts and alleyways characteristic of urban development in the 18th and early 19th centuries.

A number of notable factories would have employed a number of local people:

- Maudslay's Ironworks and Engineering — Westminster Bridge Road — 1810–1899
- Napier and Son Ltd, engineers – York Road – 1830–1903
- John Doulton's pottery — Lambeth High Street — 1826, and from the 1870s at the Doulton Works on the Thames Embankment
- William Clowes (Printer) & Sons – 1825 in Upper Ground, and then in Duke Street (in the 1840s was the largest printworks in the world). It closed following bombing in 1941.

In August 1815, the Bedlam Hospital was opened nearby for 200 patients. The dome was added between 1830 and 1850. It remained until 1930 when patients were moved to a new site in Beckenham.

By 1824, most of the cultivated land had been built over, including the addition of the following streets.

Sometime after the opening of Waterloo railway station in 1848 the locality around the station and Lower Marsh became known as Waterloo.

Vauxhall Bridge and Vauxhall Bridge Road were opened in 1816. By 1860 the village had been subsumed by the town of Lambeth.

=== The arrival of the railway ===
Waterloo station was built in 1848 and completely changed forever Lambeth Marsh's relationship to its surroundings. The sheer scale and proximity of the railway created a barrier between the street and the rest of the Lambeth Marsh.

Lower Marsh was not a place that respectable Londoners would have ventured in the latter part of the 19th century.

George Augustus Sala "Twice Round the Clock" 1859

Writing of the New Cut:

"It isn't picturesque, it isn't quaint, it isn't curious. It has not even the questionable merit of being old. It is simply Low. It is sordid, squalid, and the truth must out, disreputable. The broad thoroughfare, which, bordered with fitting houses, would make one of the handsomest streets in London, is gorged with vile, rotten tenements, occupied, by merchants who ofttimes pursue the very contrary to innocent callings. Everything is second hand, except the leviathan gin shops, which are ghastly in their newness and richness of decoration. The broad pavement presents a mixture of Vanity Fair and Rag Fair. It is the paradise of the lowest of costermongers, and often the saturnalia of the most emerited thieves. Women appear there in their most unloveley aspect: brazen, slovenly, dishevelled, brawling, muddled with beer or fractious with gin. The howling of beaten children and kicked dogs, the yells of ballad-singers, death and fire-hunters, and reciters of sham murders and elopements; the bawling recitations of professional denunciators of the Queen, the Royal family, and the ministry; the monotonous jodels of the itinerant hucksters; the fumes of the vilest tobacco, of stale corduroy suits, of oilskin caps, of mildewed umbrellas, of decaying vegetables, of escaping (and frequently surreptitiously tapped) gas, of deceased cats, of ancient fish, of cagmag meat, of dubious mutton pies, and of unwashed, soddened, unkempt, reckless humanity; all these make the night hideous and the heart sick. The New Cut is one of the most unpleasant samples of London that you could offer a foreigner."

The following quote is from "Old and New London" published in 1879:

"The regular habitués of the place may be divided into two classes — the various deals and vendors, mostly of "perishable articles", with their regular customers, on the one hand; and on the dealers in miscellaneous goods, and the hundreds of men and boys of the working, and what some people call the "dangerous" classes — irregular customers — among whom may be seen the real British "navvy" as good a specimen of humanity after his kind as one need wish to look upon, whose Sunday morning costume differs only from his week-day in having his boots unlaced."

=== Early 20th century ===
Tanswell Street, which runs south off Lower Marsh was identified for slum clearance in 1930–1. Pictures in the metropolitan archives show the condemned back to back houses in 1937 shortly before they were pulled down.

Another aerial photograph shows the area in the late 1930s shortly after the Spur Road was built linking the station down to Baylis Road. Many of Vauxhall's streets were destroyed during the construction of the railway to Waterloo station, by German bombing in World War II or ravaged through poor city planning. .

In the twentieth century war damage, and subsequent housing redevelopment has significantly changed the historic street patterns and urban scale to the south. Widening of Baylis Road and the growth of The Cut as a main traffic route in the 1960s led to the confinement of the street market to Lower Marsh, and a breakdown of the incumbent urban grain between Lower Marsh and The Cut. The buildings on Lower Marsh Street represent many phases of development and many different styles. Courts and alleyways and streets off to the sides still retain some original sett or yorkstone pavings.

=== 1980s and 1990s – The impact of Eurostar and LCC ===
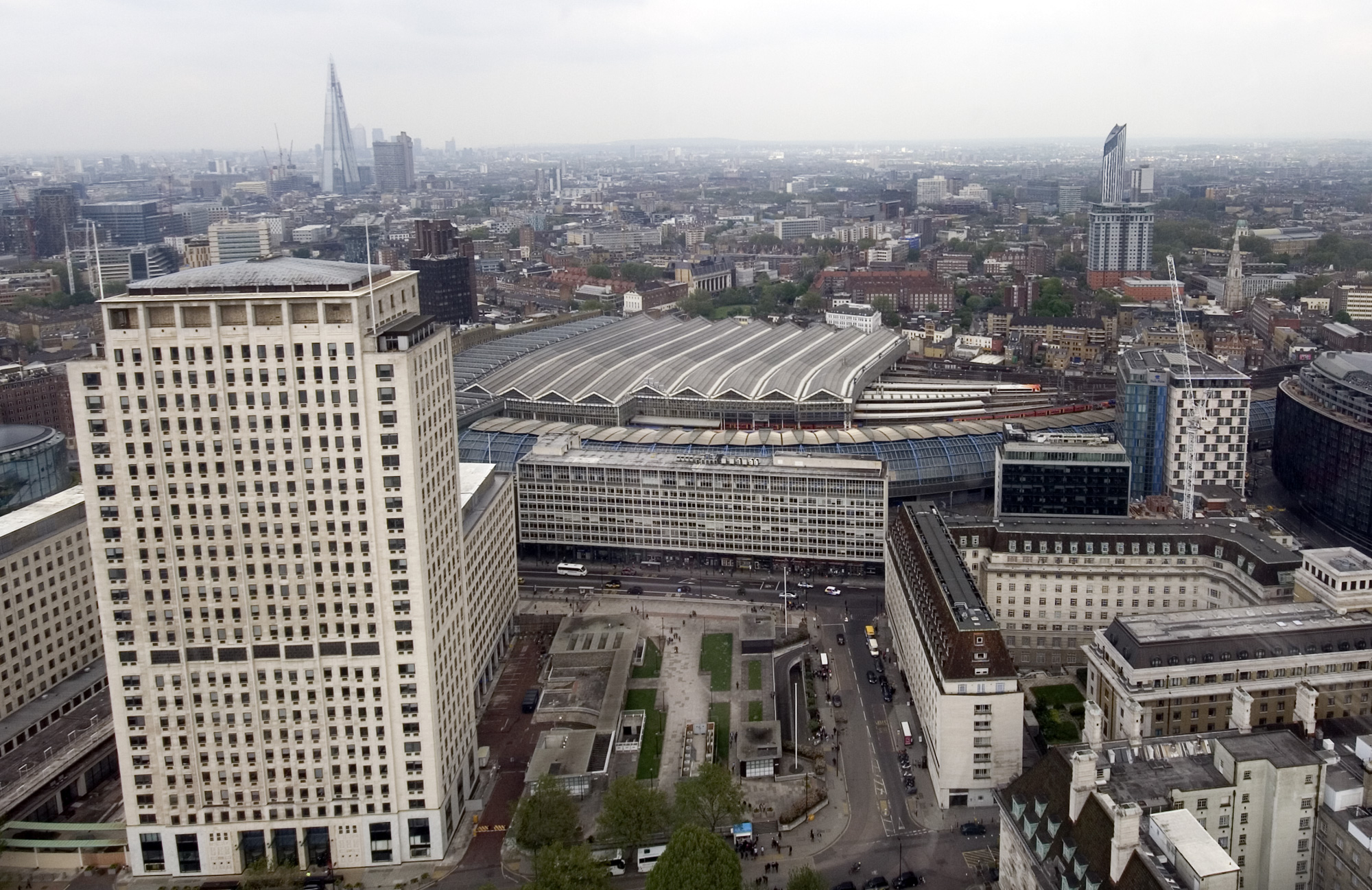
The disused Grimshaw-designed shed of the former Waterloo International can be seen nearer to camera, with the older train shed behind. In the foreground are the Shell Centre (left) and County Hall (right).

When the Eurostar was announced in the 1980s a wave of speculative property acquisition started, based on developers assumptions that Lower Marsh would be swallowed up by compulsory purchase orders to make way for hotels and car parks. As the Eurostar development was limited to the north of Waterloo station this left many freeholds in the hands of developers who had little interest in enhancing the properties that they had purchased, leading to stagnation of renovation projects in the street.

The closure of Greater London Council (GLC) headquarters at County Hall on the South Bank had a significant impact on the level of footfall traffic coming to the street, and contributed further to the decrease in the number of traders operating on the street.

=== 21st century ===
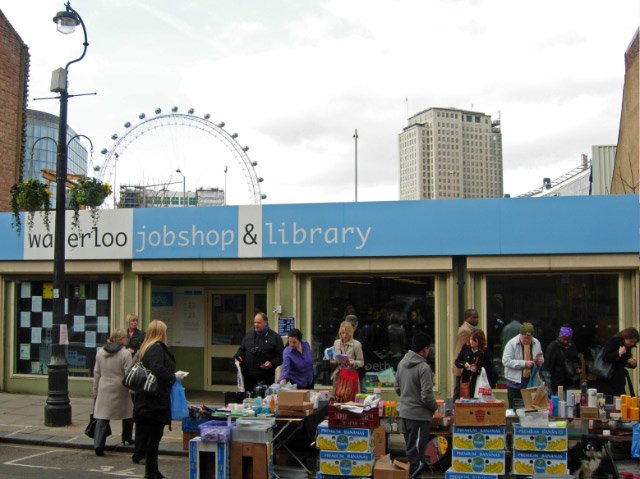
Shops and market stalls on Lower Marsh in 2014

Lower Marsh retains a quiet sense of community and is slowly being regenerated. There are an active number of community and business groups working on the regeneration of the area:

- Waterloo Community Development Group
- Waterloo Quarter Business Alliance

A recent project in 2006 has been organised by the Royal Festival Hall to capture residents memories of the street and includes a community photography project.

== Land ownership ==
- 1066 – Countess Gode, sister of King Edward (listed in the Domesday book)
- After Domesday – Bishop of Rochester.
- 14th century – Edward III grants Kennington Palace (Lambeth Marsh part of the estate?) to Edward Duke of Cornwall.
- 1646 – Act of Sequestration – returns land to the crown (but Lambeth Marsh remains in Duchy of Cornwall?).
- 1800? — Sir Robert Clayton, leased from the Duchy of Cornwall.
- 1800 – Thomas and John Lett sublet from Clayton?

Railway dates

- 1848: The railway extends from Vauxhall to Waterloo. The original station was considerably smaller than today.
- 1866: The first extension on the northern side is opened.
- 1911–2: A further, more sizable extension in 1911–12 is established. Replacing James Street and Aubin Street which at the time ran parallel to Lower Marsh.

== Bridges ==
The bridges built across the Thames had a significant effect on Lambeth Marsh and on its links with the north bank of the river. In the early nineteenth century, proposals for additional bridges met resistance from watermen, whose work depended on ferry traffic.

The principal bridges in the area include:

- Westminster Bridge: the original stone bridge, designed by Charles Labelye, opened in 1750. It was later replaced in the Victorian period by the present iron bridge.
- Blackfriars Bridge: the original stone bridge opened in 1769. It was rebuilt in 1833 and 1840.
- Waterloo Bridge: the original bridge, designed by John Rennie, opened in 1817. It was demolished in 1936 and later replaced by the current bridge.
- Lambeth Bridge: the first structure at this crossing was a suspension bridge.

== Notable residents ==
William James – James, the son of a solicitor, was born in Henley-in-Arden in 1771. He trained as a solicitor but became a land agent for the Earl of Warwick. He later moved to London where he established one of the largest land agency businesses in the country. In 1804, he projected the drainage of Lambeth Marsh which he surveyed on the instructions of the Prince of Wales and the Archbishop of Canterbury. His plans included a proposal for a new bridge over the River Thames although not quite in the same position as the Waterloo Bridge that was eventually built. He tried to raise interest in draining Lambeth Marsh again in 1808 and this time he proposed a tunnel under the Thames from College Lane (roughly in the middle of Jubilee Gardens) to Scotland Yard.

Bishop Bonner — Bonner was the Bishop of London. He was born around 1500

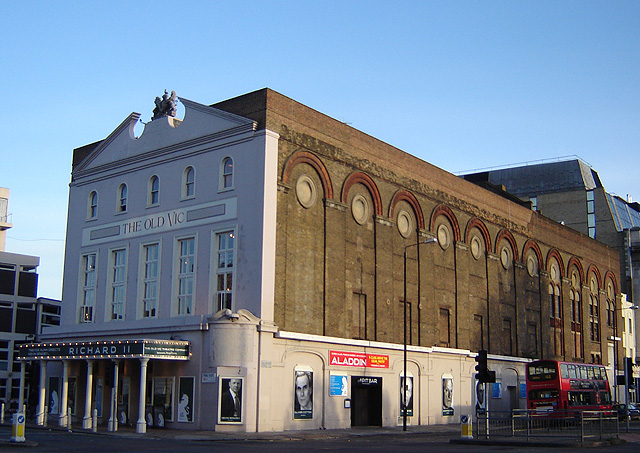
The Old Vic Theatre, at the western end of the Cut (in Lambeth).

William Curtis — Curtis ran a botanical garden close to the site of The Old Vic from 178? to ???? when he felt forced to close the botanical garden due to poor air quality. He published a magazine called The Botanical Magazine, which has remained in publication for over 200 years. The later, larger "Flora Londinensis" followed, both of which featured full page hand-colored illustrations of various plant species. Born in Alton in 1746, William Curtis started as an apothecary and went on to pursue the publication of plants. Flora Londinensis, though highly acclaimed by his fellow naturalists, was not a financial success. Curtis had labored on this work for over ten years, initially issuing the works from his premises. His fortune was made in the publication still bearing his name.

== Local governance ==
The borough covered the area of the former Lambeth parish vestry.

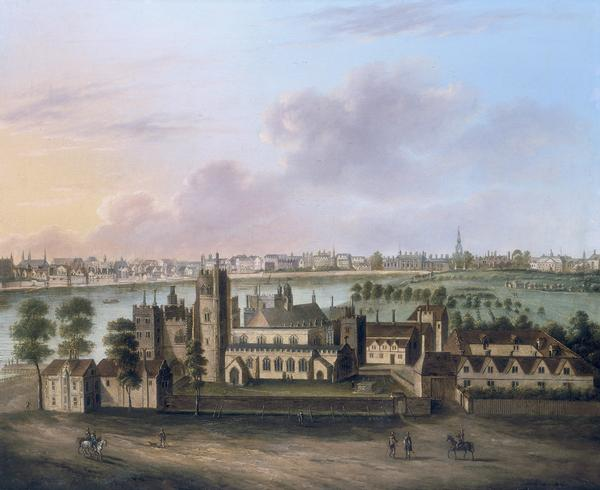
Lambeth Palace from the south circa 1685.

Since the 19th century North Lambeth has been one of the names to describe the area around Waterloo station and the shopping district around Lower Marsh market, which was the heart of the original Lambeth village. This area contains many business premises and nationally important locations such as St Thomas' Hospital, the London Eye, the Royal National Theatre, the Royal Festival Hall, County Hall, Lambeth Palace, and the Imperial War Museum (strictly this is just over the boundary in London Borough of Southwark). Lambeth North tube station is located in the area.

North Lambeth is also used to describe a modern division of the London Borough of Lambeth. This has an administrative boundary corresponding to the wards of Bishop's, Prince's, Oval and Vassall. These include the whole of the north of the Borough from the predominantly commercial areas around Waterloo to include Vauxhall, Kennington and the Oval areas which are more residential.

There is some controversy over Lambeth Council's use of the phrase 'North Lambeth Town Centre', as Waterloo, Kennington and Vauxhall each have a separate commercial centre.

It was part of the Metropolitan Borough of Lambeth was a Metropolitan borough under London County Council from 1900 to 1965.

Lower Marsh can be seen in the background of this picture in 1685.

== Maps ==
Lower Marsh appears on the following historic maps:

- Hollar — 1666
- John Rocque — 1746 — The Rocque Map of 1746
- Horwood – 1799 The Horwood Map of 1799

== See also ==
- Lambeth
- South Lambeth
- London Borough of Lambeth
