= General Lying-In Hospital =

Coordinates: 51.501598°N 0.116660°W

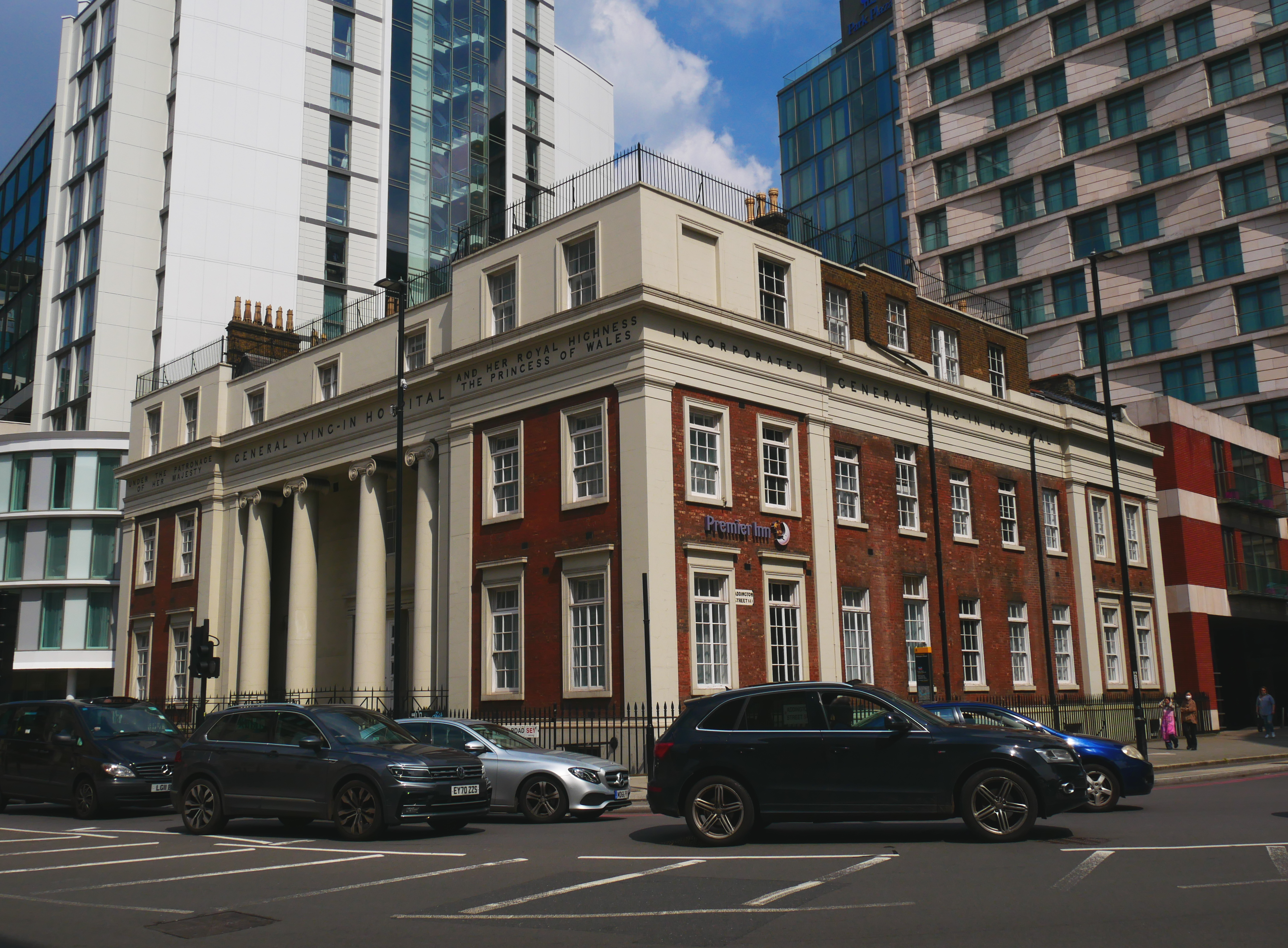
- The General Lying-In Hospital

- Location within Lambeth

Geography
- Location: Lambeth, London, England, United Kingdom

Organisation
- Care system: NHS England
- Type: Maternity
- Affiliated university: St Thomas' Hospital

Services
- Emergency department: No Accident & Emergency

History
- Founded: 1767, moved 1828
- Closed: 1971

Links
- Lists: Hospitals in England

The General Lying-In Hospital was one of the first maternity hospitals in Great Britain. It opened in 1767 on Westminster Bridge Road, London and closed in 1971. Lying-in is an archaic term for childbirth (referring to the month-long bed rest prescribed for postpartum confinement).

== History ==
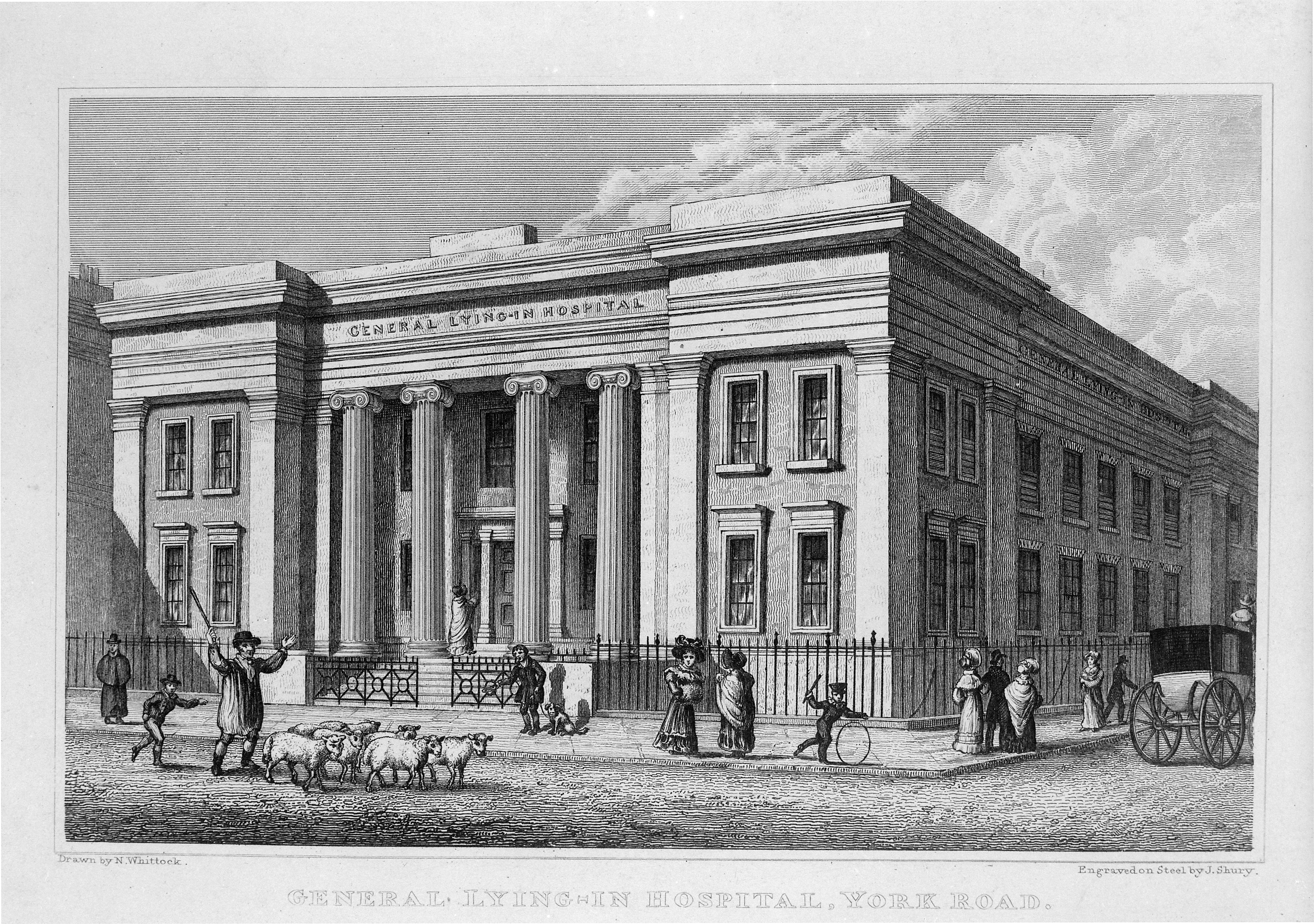
1830 illustration of the building

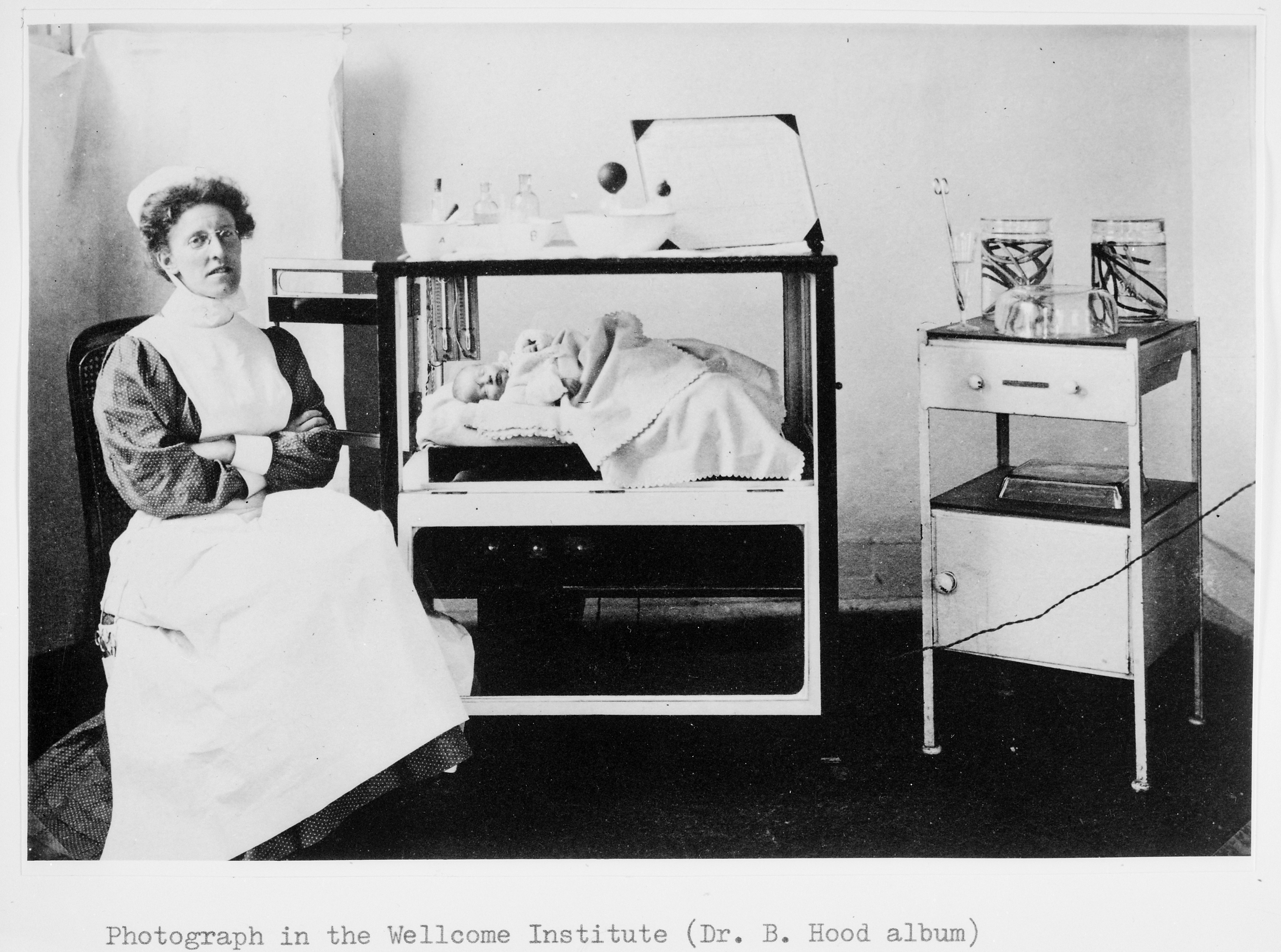
Nurse sitting with baby in incubator at the General Lying in Hospital, 1908

The General Lying-In Hospital was an initiative of Dr John Leake, a physician, and the site chosen was on the north side of Westminster Bridge Road, Lambeth, then on the outskirts of London. Its foundation stone was laid in August 1765 and the facility opened as the Westminster New Lying-in Hospital in April 1767.

With a view to expansion, the governors bought a lease of a plot of ground with 100-foot frontage on the east side of York Road, Lambeth in the early 1820s. The new building was designed by Henry Harrison and was built at a cost of about £3,000. On 22 September 1828, the minutes record that "On Friday Morning a Patient was delivered of a Son in the New Hospital and the Committee met this day in the new Hospital for the first time." The facility was incorporated by royal charter as the General Lying-In Hospital in 1830. A new ward and a training school for midwives was established in 1879.

Joseph Lister became consulting surgeon in March 1879 and Sir John Williams and Sir Francis Champneys were appointed physicians the following year. Two houses on the north side of the hospital, known as the Albany Baths, were converted into a nurses' home (i.e. staff accommodation) in 1907; this facility was re-built between 1930 and 1933 as a modern red brick building with a mansard roof, designed by E. Turner Powell. The hospital was evacuated to Diocesan House, St Albans during the Second World War, but returned to Lambeth as the maternity unit of St Thomas' Hospital in 1946.

== Restoration ==
The hospital closed in 1971, and fell into a state of dereliction. It was restored and refurbished in 2003 at a cost of £4.27 million financed in part by a grant from the Guy's and St Thomas' Charity. Since March 2013 the building has comprised part of the Premier Inn Hotel Waterloo. The modern elements of the hotel were nominated for the 2013 Carbuncle Cup for bad buildings.

== See also ==
- Rotunda Hospital, formerly the Dublin Lying-in Hospital, founded 1745
- Queen Charlotte's and Chelsea Hospital, founded 1739 in West London
- British Lying-In Hospital, 1749
