= Soho Society =

Soho Society may refer to:

- The Soho Society, a community association for the London district of Soho
- Soho Society (book), a 2008 book by Bernie Katz
