= Oakley Street =

Oakley Street may refer to:

- Oakley Street, Chelsea, London
- Baylis Road, Lambeth, London; previously called Oakley Street
