= Kennington Road =

Street in Lambeth, London

Coordinates: 51°29′38″N 0°06′39″W

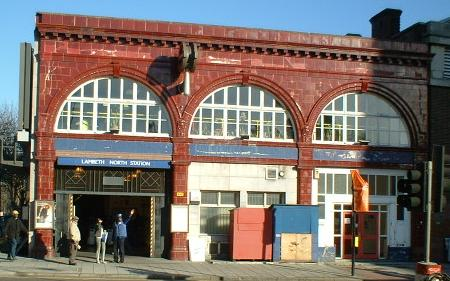
Lambeth North Underground station at the north end of Kennington Road.

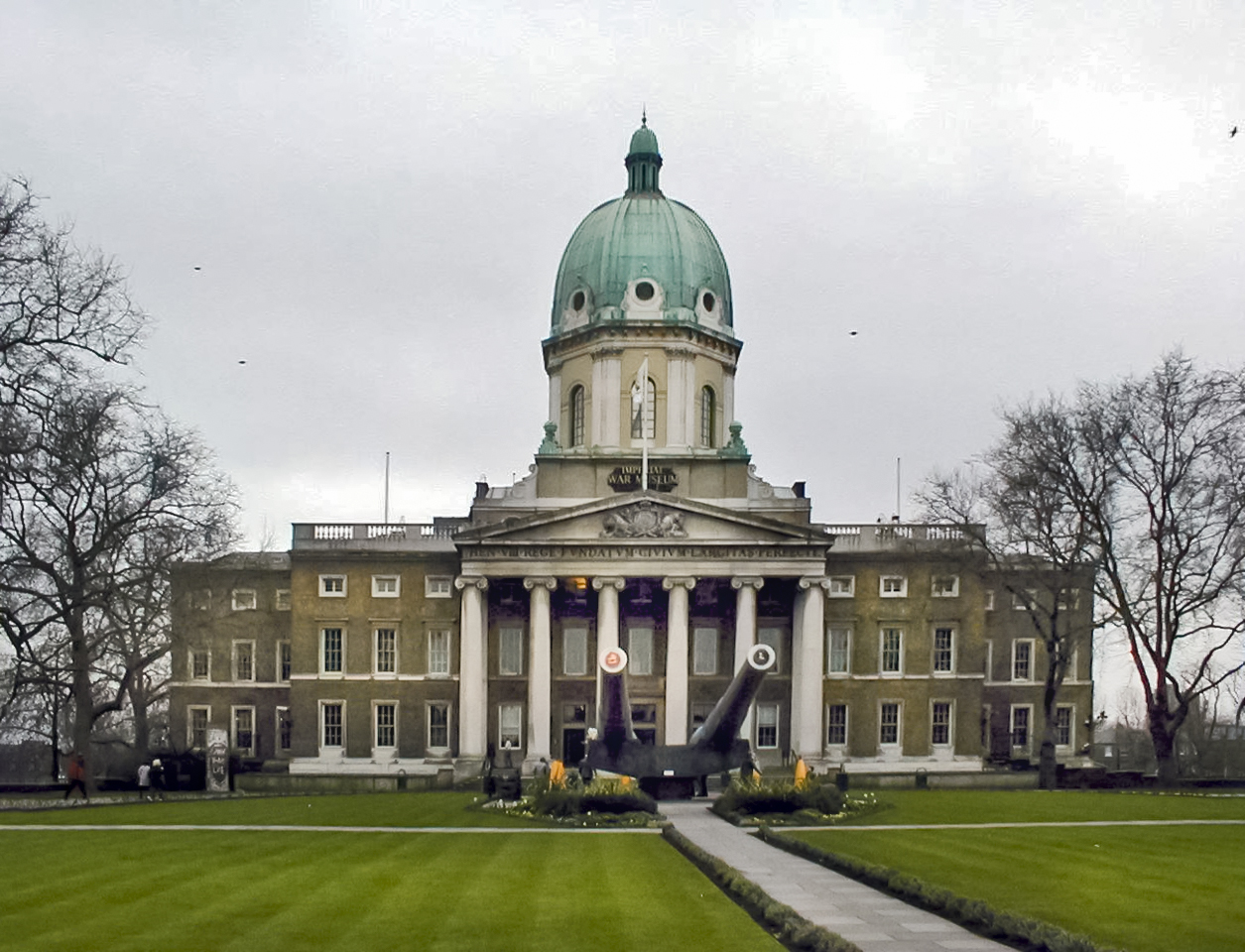
Imperial War Museum off Kennington Road.

Kennington Road is a long straight road, approximately a mile in length, in the London Borough of Lambeth in London, England, running south from Westminster Bridge Road (at the junction with Baylis Road to the north-east) to Kennington Park Road.

The road is designated as the A23. Formerly open land, in 1751, a year after Westminster Bridge was opened, it was constructed by the Turnpike Trustees to improve communication from the bridge to routes south of the river Thames. With the growing popularity of Brighton as a resort in the later eighteenth century it became part of the route there, used by George IV on his excursions there and later for other London to Brighton events such as the London to Brighton Veteran Car Run.

Lambeth North Underground station is located at the north end of the road at the junction with Westminster Bridge Road. The Imperial War Museum (formerly the Bethlem Royal Hospital) is to the east, in Geraldine Mary Harmsworth Park, south of the junction with Lambeth Road (A3203). Kennington Park is to the south.

The Lincoln Tower built by Christopher Newman Hall in the late nineteenth century in memory of Abraham Lincoln and the Emancipation Proclamation is situated close to the junction with Westminster Bridge Road along with the modernist Christ Church and Upton Chapel that replaces Newman Hall's Victorian gothic chapel that was destroyed during the Second World War.

Though there has been much rebuilding and demolition, many of the grand Georgian terraces lining Kennington Road still survive. The Old Town Hall for the Metropolitan Borough of Lambeth also still survives.

== Notable residents ==
Sir Julian Corbett, 1854–1922, prominent British naval historian and geostrategist of the late 19th and early 20th centuries, whose works helped shape the Royal Navy's reforms of that era, was born at Walcot House, 139 Kennington Road.

Felix Slade (1788–1868), lawyer and collector, lived with his brother at Slade House, Walcot Place East, 173 Kennington Road, at the corner with Wincott Street (not at the corner of Walnut Tree Walk as some have claimed). The house was pulled down sometime after World War 1, and the site is now occupied by a 1930's mixed development of shops (Wincott Parade) with flats above. In his will Slade endowed professorships of fine art at Oxford, Cambridge and University College London, and founded the Slade School of Art.

The artist Vincent van Gogh (1853–1890) lived at Ivy Cottage, 395 Kennington Road, from August to October 1874 and from December 1874 to May 1875.

Ray Ellington (1916-1985), the popular singer, jazz musician, and bandleader, was born Henry Pitts Brown at 155 Kennington Road. The Ray Ellington Quartet achieved fame as the resident band on The Goon Show, which ran from 1951 to 1960.

Victoria Drummond (1894-1978), Queen Victoria's god-daughter and Britain's first qualified female marine engineer, lived at 143, and later at 160 Kennington Road, from 1929 until near the end of her life.

Sir Michael Grylls, 1934–2001, Conservative politician, lived at Walcot House, 139 Kennington Road. His son, Bear Grylls, the Chief Scout, lived there as a child.

Sir Christopher Chataway, 1931–2014, Olympic athlete and politician, lived at 145 Kennington Road.

As a child, Charlie Chaplin lived at 287 Kennington Road (now marked by a plaque) and at various other locations on the road and in the immediate vicinity, such as 3 Pownall Terrace (since demolished). In the 19th century this area, near the Canterbury and Gatti's music halls in Westminster Bridge Road, was much favoured as a residence by performers in the music hall tradition such as Charlie Chaplin's parents. Public houses on Kennington Road such as 'The Three Stags' (which still exists and now has a 'Chaplin Bar'), 'The White Horse', 'The Tankard' (which exists now as the Grand Union) and the famous 'Horns Tavern' (demolished in the 1960s) were also patronised by music hall professionals.

South London criminal Brian "Little Legs" Clifford lived at 126 Kennington Road where he was murdered in 1985. The case has never been solved.
