= Verulam House, St Albans =

Coordinates: 51.7539°N 0.3422°W

Verulam House
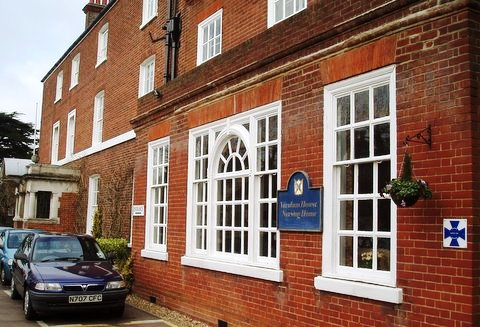
- Verulam House, St Albans
- Interactive map of the Verulam House area

General information
- Location: St Albans Hertfordshire, England
- Construction started: 1825

Verulam House is located in Verulam Road, St Albans on the northwestern side between Church Crescent and Britton Avenue opposite College Street. It has previously been referred to as Diocesan House and also known as the Bishop's Palace. Named after a house built in central St Albans by Francis Bacon, it is of early nineteenth-century origin and is a Grade II Listed Building.

== History ==
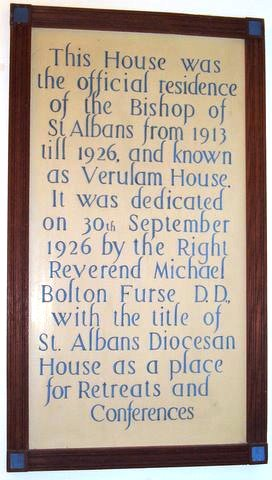

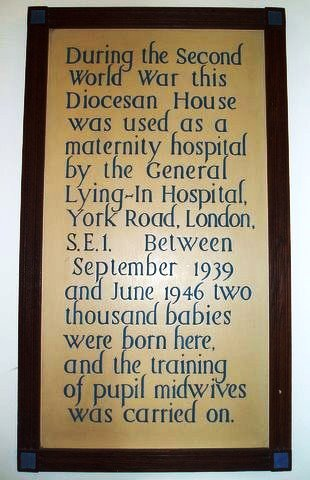

Originally built as a coaching inn known as ‘The Verulam Arms’ which opened in 1826 at the same time as Verulam Road which was then a new section of a super highway (post road) built by Thomas Telford (the 'Colossus of Roads') from London to the port of Holyhead. The new road bypassed a section of the town and the narrow main road northwest out of St Albans at the time: George Street, Romeland and Fishpool Street.

In 1849, after the expansion of the railways and the subsequent decline in the stage/mail coach and carriage traffic for which St Albans depended upon for much of its prosperity, the inn was sold and its associated stables were demolished.

The former stable area provided land for the building of an adjacent Roman Catholic church under the patronage of the local MP of that time, Alexander Raphael. Raphael died intestate shortly after commencement of construction of the church and the site was purchased by Mrs Isabella Worley, who had the church completed according to its original design in 1856 and donated it to the Church of England. This church was known as Christ Church and, although it has been converted to offices since the early 1970s, its Lombardic style tower can still be seen on Verulam Road just to the north west of the house.

The house then became a private residence and was occupied in the mid nineteenth century by the Palin family who are believed to have been related to the Vyses (John Palin married Anne Vyse in 1796), operators of a straw hat factory in the Hatfield district of St Albans. John Palin married Anne Vyse in 1796.

The house became the official residence of the Anglican Bishop of St Albans and became known as the Bishop's Palace in 1908 and then became a Diocesan Retreat and Conference Centre used by the Church of England Diocese of St Albans in 1926.

Throughout the Second World War it was known as Diocesan House. It became a maternity hospital and a facility for training pupil midwives by the General Lying-In Hospital which had been evacuated from York Road, Lambeth, (Waterloo), in central London. During the period between September 1939 and June 1946 two thousand babies were born here. The General Lying-In Hospital was re-established at its former Lambeth premises in 1946 after the end of the war.

In 1994, Verulam House was sold by the Diocese of St Albans and a trust fund set up with the proceeds. Since 1996 the House has been the site of the 'Verulam House Nursing and Residential Home'. The home is owned by Peter Jackson and Damian Tominey and trade as Verulam Healthcare. Religious services are still held in the old chapel.
