= Union Jack Club =

Military club in London, England

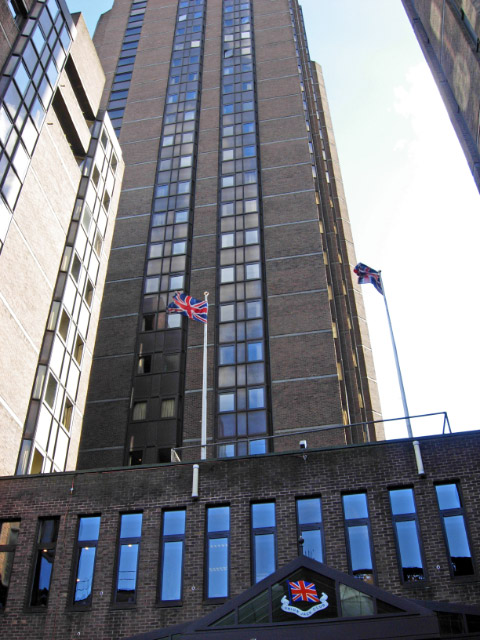
- View at the main entrance looking up
- Formation: 1904
- Purpose: To provide Non-Commissioned members of the Armed Forces with a club and accommodation in London
- Coordinates: 51°30′13″N 0°06′39″W
- Members: Enlisted/Non-Commissioned Members of the British Armed Forces
- Patron-in-Chief: King Charles III
- Website: https://ujc.org.uk/

The Union Jack Club is a private members club in central London, England, for enlisted / non-commissioned (other ranks) serving and veteran members of the His Majesty's Armed Forces and their families. Located adjacent to London Waterloo railway station, in central London's South Bank, the club has over 266 rooms for accommodation (singles, twins, doubles, fully accessible, family, suite and flats), a restaurant, a bar, small library, and a full range of meeting and banqueting rooms, which can be hired by the public. The Union Jack Club also organises an extensive annual programme of events for its members, including military talks, battlefield tours, masterclasses, day trips, and summer schools.

The club's main entrance is in Sandell Street, off Waterloo Road, opposite Waterloo East railway station. Many guest bedrooms and meeting rooms are on the upper floors, with views over London.

== History ==
The idea for the club came from Ethel McCaul, a Royal Red Cross nurse who served in field hospitals during the South African War at the start of the 20th century. She noted that while officers enjoyed membership of various gentlemen's clubs in London, no equivalent existed for enlisted personnel, and they therefore used public houses and inns of varying repute. The initial sum of £60,000 was raised at various galas and functions. Any donor giving £100 could name a room. Sir Arthur Conan Doyle took the opportunity to endow the "Lady Conan Doyle Room" with his contribution. Members of the royal family attended a benefit concert at the Royal Albert Hall.

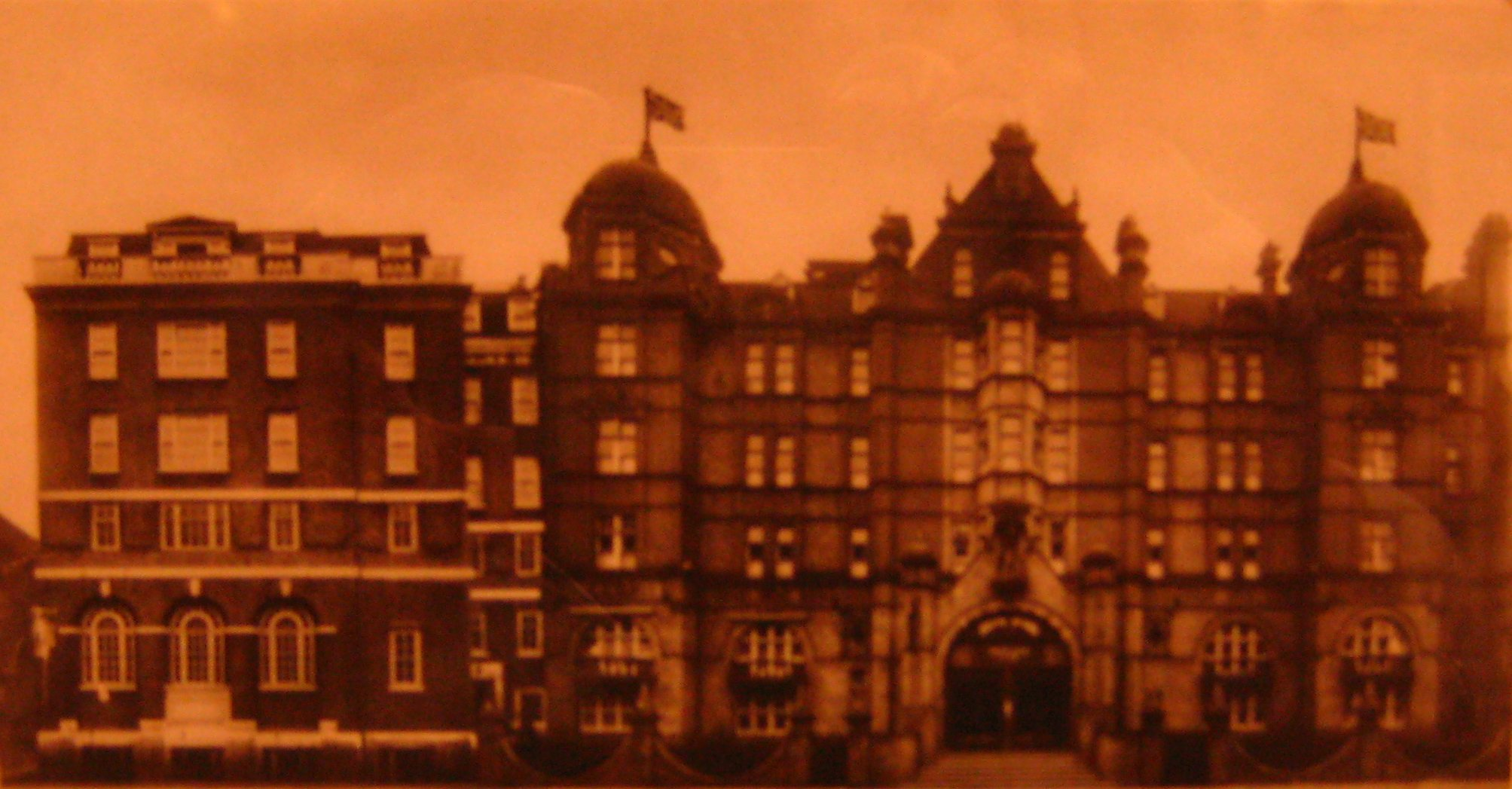
The first Union Jack Club building in Waterloo Road

George V, while the Prince of Wales, laid the club's foundation stone in July 1904. It was officially opened three years later, in July 1907, by King Edward VII and Queen Alexandra. The address of the original Edwardian building was 91 Waterloo Road, London.

Ethel McCaul was adamant that her brave servicemen and their families should have somewhere to stay at no more cost than one day's pay. Waterloo seemed the obvious place as this was the principal railhead leading to the ports and garrisons that served the Empire. The Union Jack Club was to be built as a National Memorial to those who had fallen in the South African War. The Union Jack Club naturally found itself in great demand during both World Wars, and its resources were fully stretched, with the Union Jack Club growing from 208 bedrooms in 1904 to a total of 800 beds in 1939. For many years after World War I, an annual donation was sent anonymously to the Union Jack Club, and with each payment came a note with the words "In gratitude for a scrap of comfort". The words of this anonymous donor are today commemorated by a marble plaque sited in the reception area.

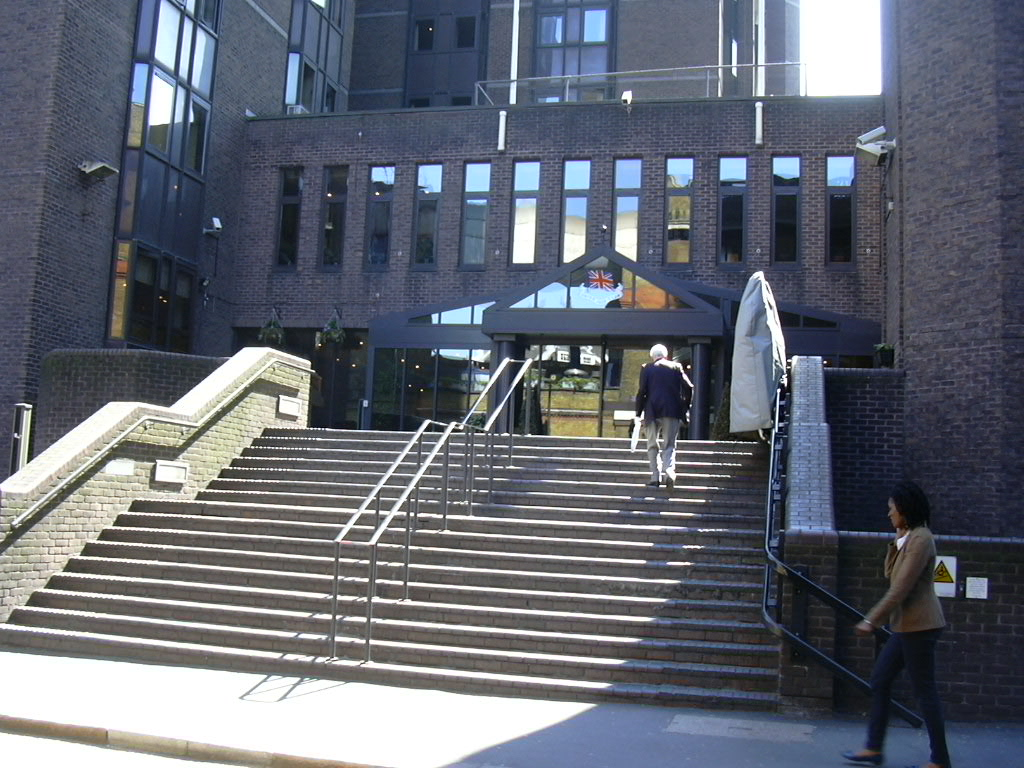
The main entrance in Sandell Street

During World War II, the area around Waterloo Station was bombed severely, and the Union Jack Club itself suffered considerable damage, which required extensive repair. Added to this, there was an urgent need to modernise its amenities, décor, and the way it conducted its business. In 1970, it was therefore decided to construct a completely new building, with 'Investors in Industry' (now 3i) building three tower blocks, leasing one block for a period of 125 years while the remaining two blocks would constitute the new Union Jack Club. Demolition work began in 1971, and the Union Jack Club opened for business on its new premises on 16 October 1975.

In 2004, Queen Elizabeth II and her husband Prince Philip, Duke of Edinburgh visited the club to help celebrate its centenary.

There are a number of points of historical interest throughout the Union Jack Club, such as the Victoria Cross and George Cross boards, which are the only known commemoration of their kind to all those who have earned the medals. During state ceremonial events and particularly Remembrance weekend, the club is a major focal point for the non-commissioned military community. The Saturday evening of Remembrance weekend is marked by the club with an enormous projection onto its 24-storey tower, which honours the fallen.

The club has Royal patronage. Queen Elizabeth II was the Union Jack Club's Patron from 1974 until her death in 2022. King Charles III became Patron-in-Chief in 2023. Since it opened in 1907, over 23 million people have stayed at the Union Jack Club.
