= Baylis Road =

Road in Lambeth, London

Coordinates: 51°30′01″N 0°06′40″W

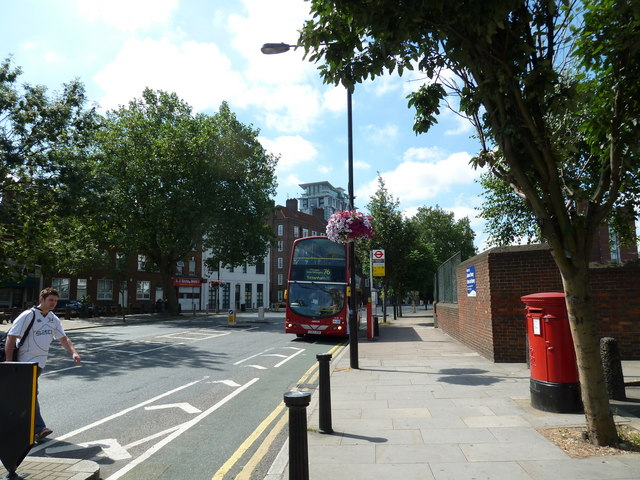
Baylis Road, looking west

Baylis Road is a thoroughfare in Lambeth, London SE1, England running between Westminster Bridge Road to the South-West and Waterloo Road to the North-East.

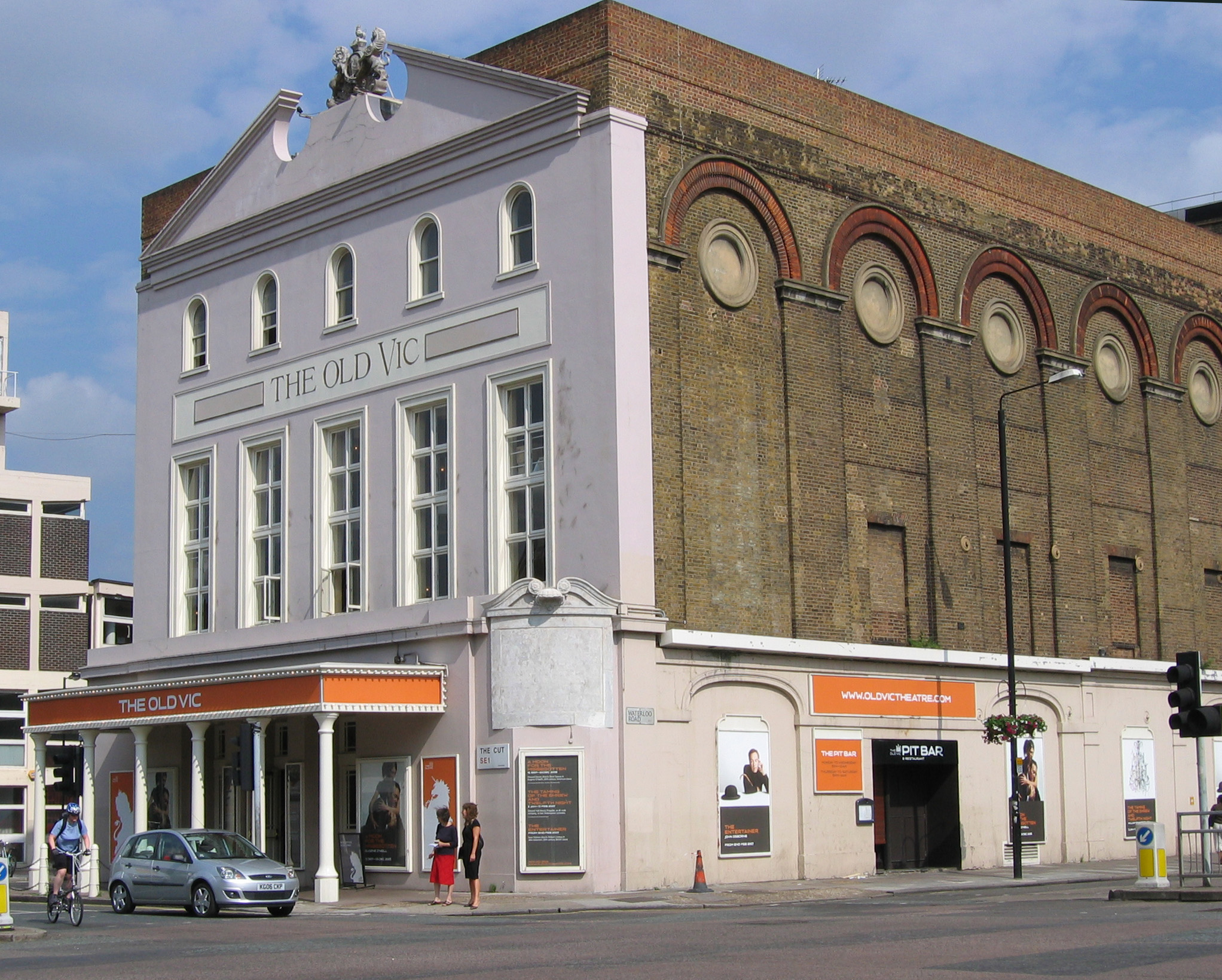
The Old Vic Theatre from the north-east end of Baylis Road.

At its northern end Baylis Road continues North-East as The Cut. The Old Vic Theatre is located on The Cut where the roads meet. Waterloo station is to the north.

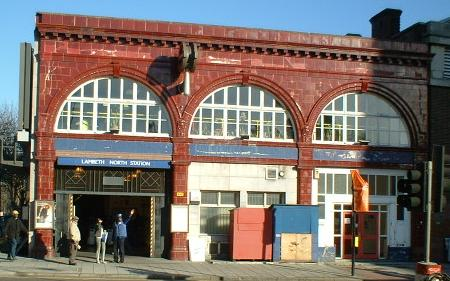
Lambeth North Underground station at the South end of Baylis Road.

To the South the road crosses Westminster Bridge Road and continues as Kennington Road (the A23). Lambeth North Underground station is located at this junction.

The Waterloo Action Centre is located at 14 Baylis Road. It is co-located with the Waterloo Action Centre Gallery, formerly known as Waterloo Gallery, which was established in 1997 and is close to the South Bank arts area of London.

The Duke of Sussex public house is at 23 Baylis Road. Historically, this served beer from the now defunct Truman, Hanbury, Buxton & Co Ltd brewery in London.

Lilian Baylis (1874–1937), theatrical producer, who managed the Old Vic.

The road is named after Lilian Baylis (1874–1937), a theatrical producer and manager, who managed the Old Vic Theatre. Previously, the road was called Oakley Street, since when the route of the road has been moved at its northern end to merge with Lower Marsh.

On 16 November 1802, Colonel Edward Marcus Despard and his co-conspirators were arrested at the Oakley Arms public house at 72 Oakley Street for their part in the Despard Plot. In all, some forty people were arrested and they all appeared before magistrates at Union Hall police office the following day. Their somewhat half baked conspiracy had been betrayed by one of the group, Thomas Windsor, who was the chief witness at their trial. Those convicted of high treason were Colonel Edward Marcus Despard, 50, John Wood, 36, John Francis, 23, both privates in the army, Thomas Broughton, 26, a carpenter, James Sedgwick Wratton, 35, a shoemaker, Arthur Graham, 53, a slater, John Macnamara, Thomas Newman, Daniel Tindall, and William Lander. All were charged with three counts of High Treason and tried before a Special Commission on Monday, 7 February 1803, for conspiring to capture and kill the King and overthrow the government. They had also planned to stop the mail coaches entering and leaving London and take over the Tower. Admiral Lord Nelson appeared in Despard's defence and gave him an excellent character reference. However, all ten were found guilty. Newman, Tindall and Lander were respited and later transported as convicts to Australia. The remaining seven executed at Horsemonger Lane Gaol.

The road was home to Campbell Buildings, a Victorian estate which in the late 1970s and early 1980s was home to one of London's larger squats for the punk community. Australian author Bob Short wrote of his time in Baylis Road in his book Trash Can. The estate was finally demolished in the mid-1980s. The estate was featured in Hammer House of Horror episode 3, 'Rude Awakening' where the estate agent and his girlfriend are trapped in the building as it is demolished.

== See also ==
- List of eponymous roads in London
