= Brian "Little Legs" Clifford =

English criminal and club owner

Brian Benham "Little Legs" Clifford (29 February 1940 - 28 September 1985) was a south London criminal and club owner who was murdered at home as he slept. His murder has never been solved.

== Early life ==
Brian Clifford was born on 29 February 1940 in Lambeth, London. In 1960, he married Rhoda R. Katz in Stepney, London. The couple had children Karon (born 1961), Deborah (born 1962) and Bernard (Bernie) (1968-2017) who was the manager of the Groucho Club in Soho.

== Career ==
Bernie Katz described his father as "a real villain with a heavy clout around south London." His nickname came from his short stature. According to professional thief Shirley Pitts, he had to attach wooden blocks to the pedals of his Rolls-Royce car in order to drive it. Stephen Smith, who knew Clifford well, described him as handsome with wavy black hair combed back but an uncontrollable temper.

Shirley Pitts said in her memoirs that Clifford ran several night clubs in London's West End while "Mad" Frankie Fraser described him as a "mover, a buyer of gear" (a fence) who shot Johnny Mangan twice in the head in 1979 and was tried for attempted murder but acquitted. Stephen Smith described an occasion on which he flew with Clifford to Switzerland and successfully exchanged forged U.S. dollars for genuine British currency in the banks there.

== Death ==
Clifford was killed by a masked assailant or assailants while he slept at his home of 126 Kennington Road, London, on 28 September 1985. According to Shirley Pitts, he was killed by Italians after a deal relating to a lot of Capodimonte porcelain went bad but the crime has never been solved. According to official records he left an estate not exceeding £40,000. In December 1985, Stuart Holland MP revealed in a parliamentary debate that the house had been bought for Clifford in the false name of Mrs Robinson for less than £17,000 in 1984 and the police were investigating the connection between Clifford and a number of sales of property by the St Olave charity, from whom Clifford had bought number 126.
