= Bernie Katz =

Manager of the Groucho Club

Bernard Daniel Katz
- Bernie Katz
- Born: Bernard Daniel Clifford; August 10, 1968
- Died: August 31, 2017 (aged 49)
- Other name: "The Prince of Soho"
- Occupations: Club manager, author
- Known for: Long-serving manager of the Groucho Club
- Notable work: Soho Society (2008)
- Parent: Brian "Little Legs" Clifford (father)

Bernard Daniel Katz, born Bernard Daniel Clifford, (10 August 1968 – 31 August 2017) was the long-serving manager of the Groucho Club. Katz was the author of Soho Society in 2008. He was nicknamed "The Prince of Soho" by Stephen Fry. He was the son of the notorious south London gangster Brian "Little Legs" Clifford, who was killed in an unsolved murder in 1985.

A podcast was made about his life in 2021 by Mark Edmonds; Edmonds died in 2024.

== See also ==
- Muriel Belcher
