= Waterloo Road, London =

Road in London

Coordinates: 51.5018°N 0.1091°W

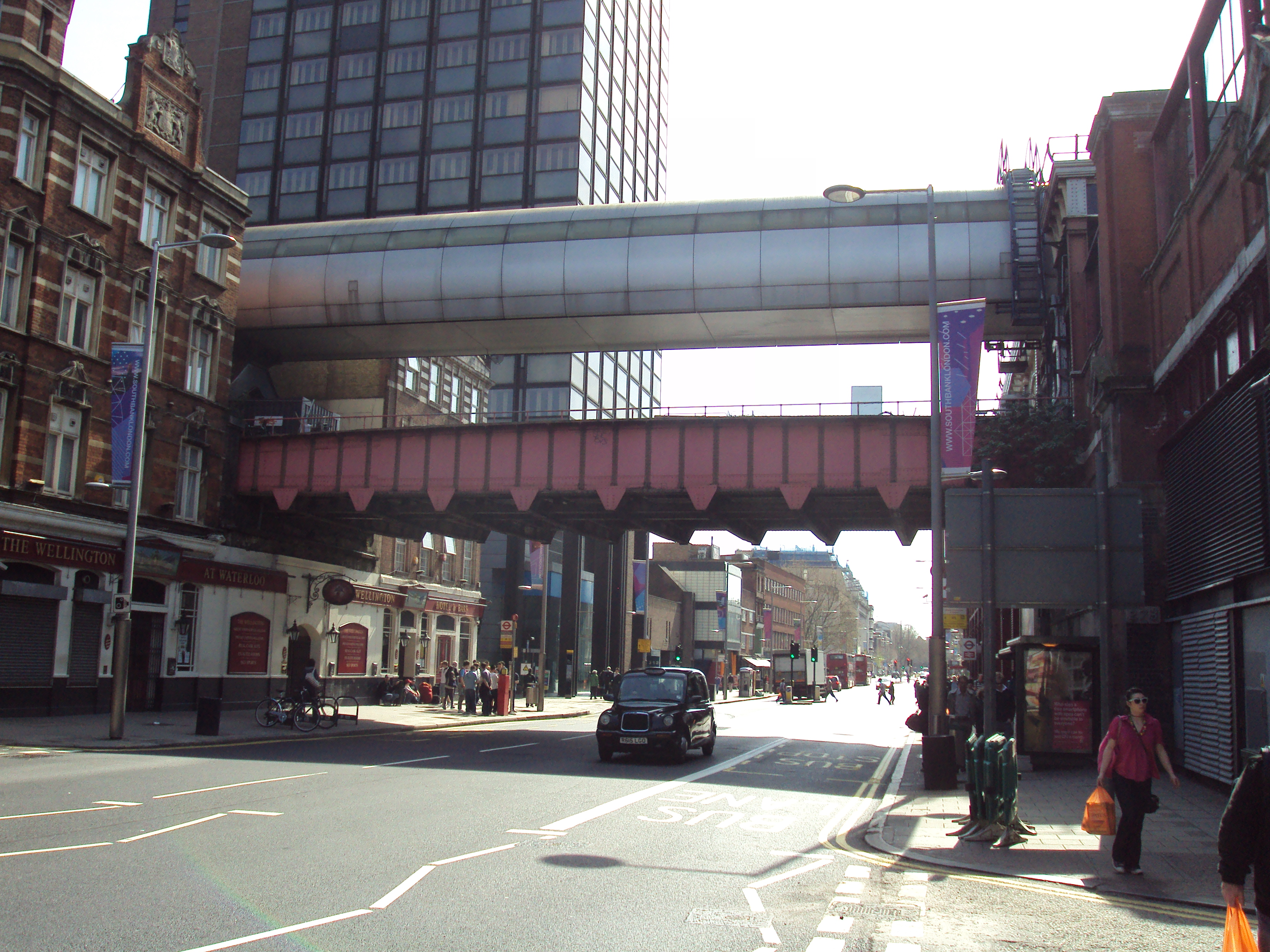
Interconnecting bridges between Waterloo and Waterloo East stations, crossing Waterloo Road

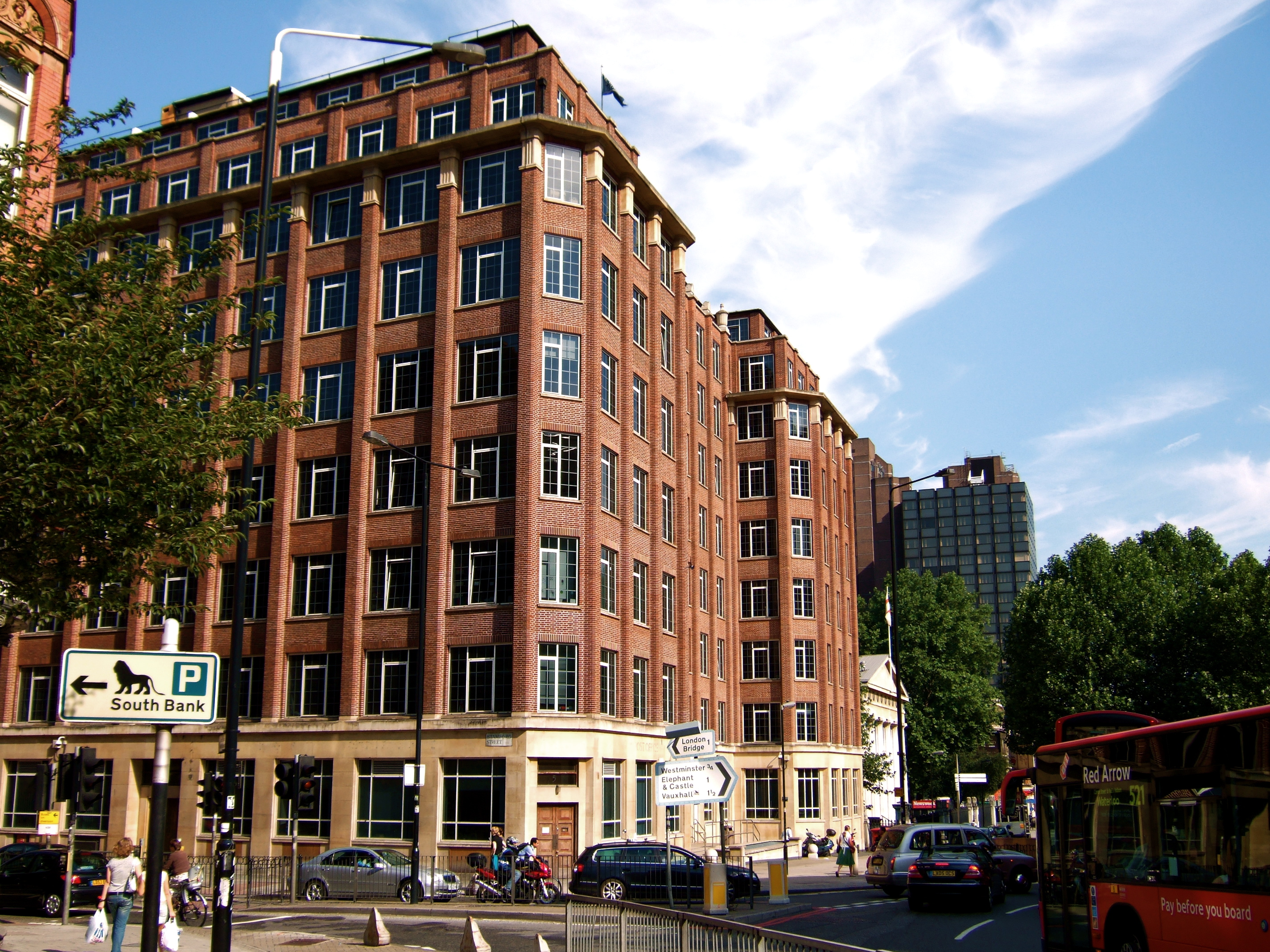
The James Clerk Maxwell Building of King's College London, on the east side of Waterloo Road near the BFI London IMAX cinema.

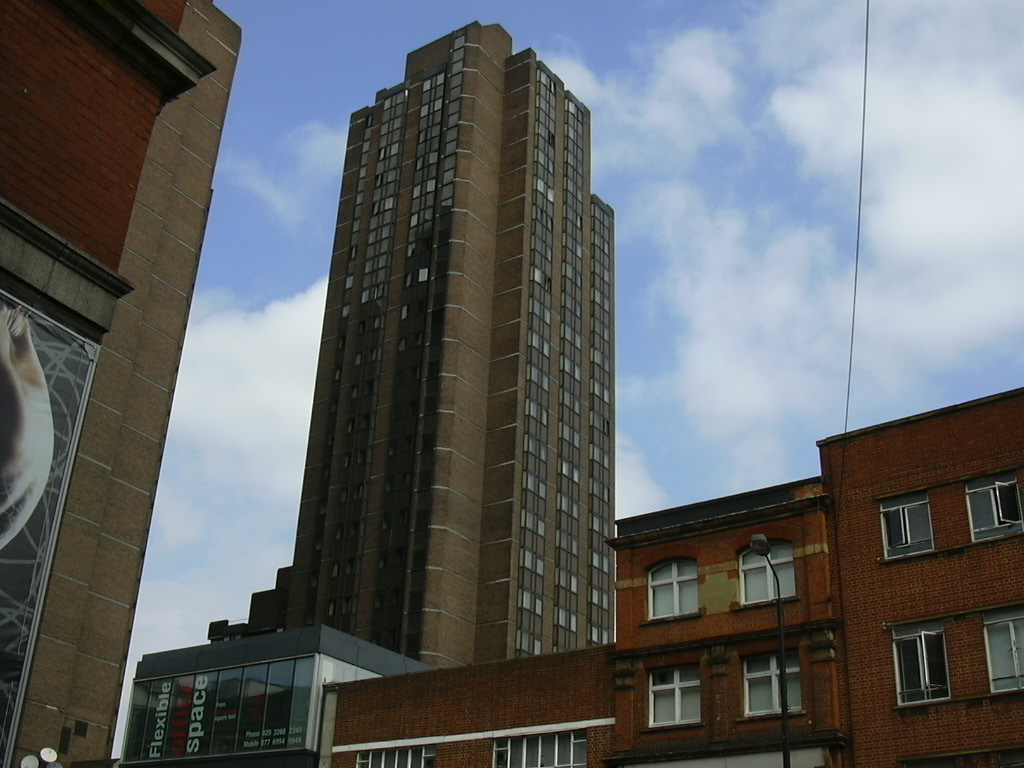
The Union Jack Club from Waterloo Road, opposite Waterloo Station.

Waterloo Road is the main road in the Waterloo district of London, England straddling the boroughs of Lambeth and Southwark. It runs between Westminster Bridge Road close to St George's Circus at the south-east end and Waterloo Bridge across the River Thames towards London's West End district at the north-west end.

At the northern end near the river are the Queen Elizabeth Hall and the Hayward Gallery to the west, the National Film Theatre below the road, and the Royal National Theatre to the east. In earlier times, this was the location of Cuper's Gardens.

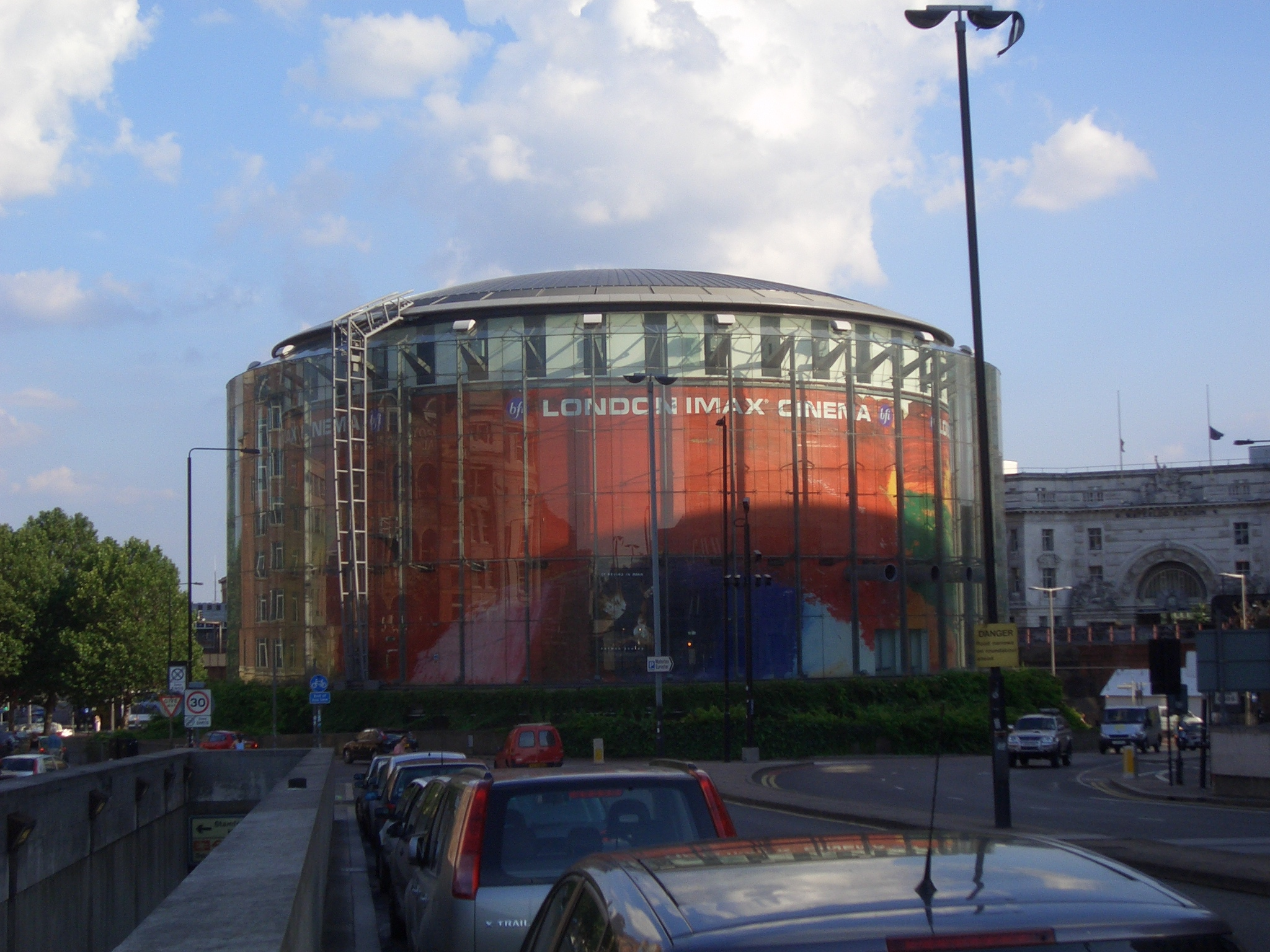
The BFI London IMAX cinema towards the north-west end of Waterloo Road.

Just to the south in the middle of a large roundabout with underground walkways is the British Film Institute (BFI) London IMAX Cinema. Nearby to the east is the James Clerk Maxwell Building of King's College London, named in honour of the physicist James Clerk Maxwell (1831–1879), who was a professor at the college from 1860.

A little further to the south is St John's Waterloo church, designed by Francis Octavius Bedford and built in 1824 to celebrate the victory of the Napoleonic Wars. The church was firebombed in 1940 and much of the interior was destroyed. It was restored and reopened in 1951, serving as the parish church for the Festival of Britain on the South Bank nearby.

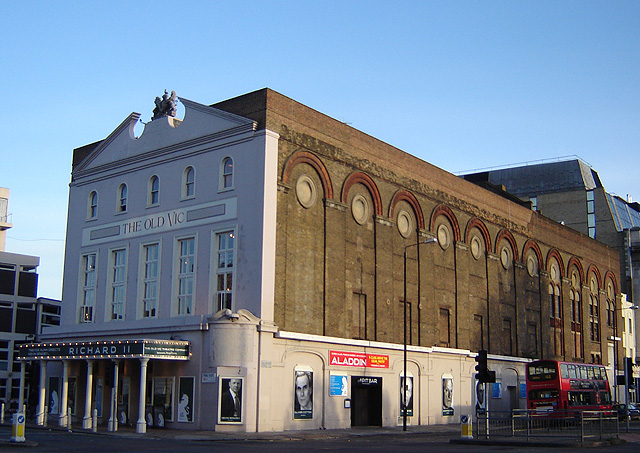
The Old Vic Theatre from the corner of Baylis Road and Waterloo Road.

Continuing south, to the west is Waterloo station. To the east is the Union Jack Club in Sandell Street and, further on, the well-known and historic Old Vic Theatre to the south of the corner with The Cut. Also located even further south in Waterloo Road on the west side is the headquarters of the London Ambulance Service. On the opposite side is 157 Partnership House, former headquarters of USPG, CMS and other church mission/community-based organisations. Now boarded up and ready for redevelopment.

The road is designated as the A301, which continues across Waterloo Bridge.

== Adjoining roads ==
- Baylis Road
- The Cut
- Stamford Street
- Westminster Bridge Road
- York Road
- St George's Circus
