= St George's Circus =

Road junction in Southwark, London, England

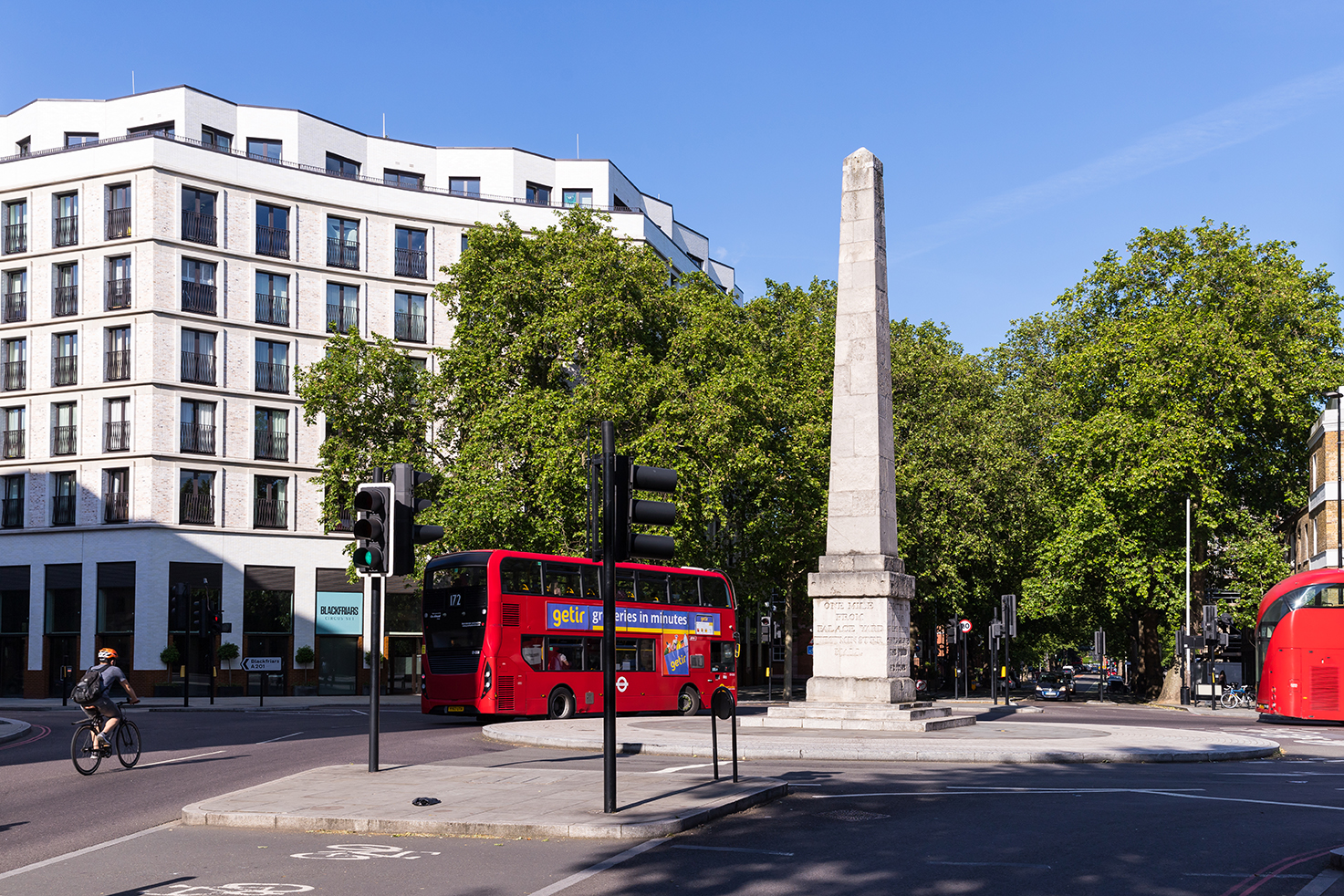
- Obelisk at St George's Circus, 2021
- Interactive map of St George's Circus

Location
- London, United Kingdom
- Coordinates: 51°29′55″N 0°06′18″W
- Roads at junction: Blackfriars Road, Borough Road, London Road, Lambeth Road, Westminster Bridge Road and Waterloo Road

Construction
- Type: Intersection
- Opened: 1771

St George's Circus is a road junction in Southwark, London, England. At its centre, which is now a traffic roundabout, is an historic obelisk, designed by Robert Mylne (1733–1811), in his role as surveyor and architect of Blackfriars Bridge.

== History ==
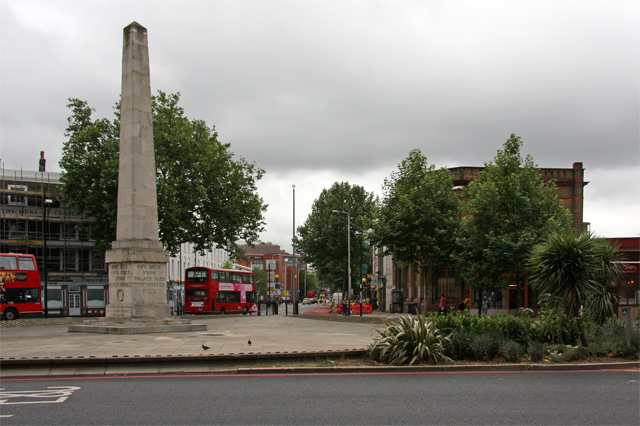
Obelisk at St George's Circus, 2008

St George's Circus was built in 1771 to mark the completion of the new roads through St George's Fields in the parish of Southwark St George the Martyr during the tenure of Brass Crosby as Lord Mayor of the City of London. It was the first purpose-built traffic junction in London, and initially featured an obelisk with four oil lamps affixed to it. The obelisk was removed in 1897 for a clocktower, to commemorate Queen Victoria's diamond jubilee. In 1905, it was relocated to what is now the Geraldine Mary Harmsworth Park, in front of the Imperial War Museum. The clocktower was demolished as a "nuisance to traffic" in the 1930s, but the obelisk did not return to its original location until 1998, by then without the oil lamps. At the base of the obelisk is the inscription Erected in XI year of the reign of King George MDCCLXXI, with the inscriptions on the other three sides reflecting the obelisk's distances from Palace Yard (one mile), London Bridge (one mile 40 feet) and Fleet Street (one mile 350 feet). The obelisk has been Grade II listed since 1950, when it was in its previous location.

The landscaping introduced in the centre of the circus when the obelisk returned incorporated a semi circle of soil in which two Cabbage Palms were planted. This was then neglected and fell into long term decay until in 2005 guerrilla gardeners took over the land. They subsequently replanted it with lavender, rosemary, tulips, campanula, azalea and even a 7' Christmas tree, but is no longer planted.

The circus and obelisk provided a formal termination of Blackfriars Road, a mile long boulevard from the recently constructed Blackfriars Bridge. At the circus, Blackfriars Road intersected with new and existing highways to Lambeth, Newington, Westminster Bridge and The Borough at Southwark. In local parlance the area was known as the "obliss", it was a destination point for both trams and busses, so passengers, – if they so wished – could ask for a "tuppeny to the obliss please guv."

The St. George's Fields (Surrey) Improvement Act 1812 (52 Geo. 3. c. ccxi) required that all new building around the circus should have concave fronts and should be consistent with a minimum diameter across the Circus of 240 ft. It also specified that no houses "inferior to the 3rd building rate should be erected on the frontages of Borough Road and St. George’s Circus".

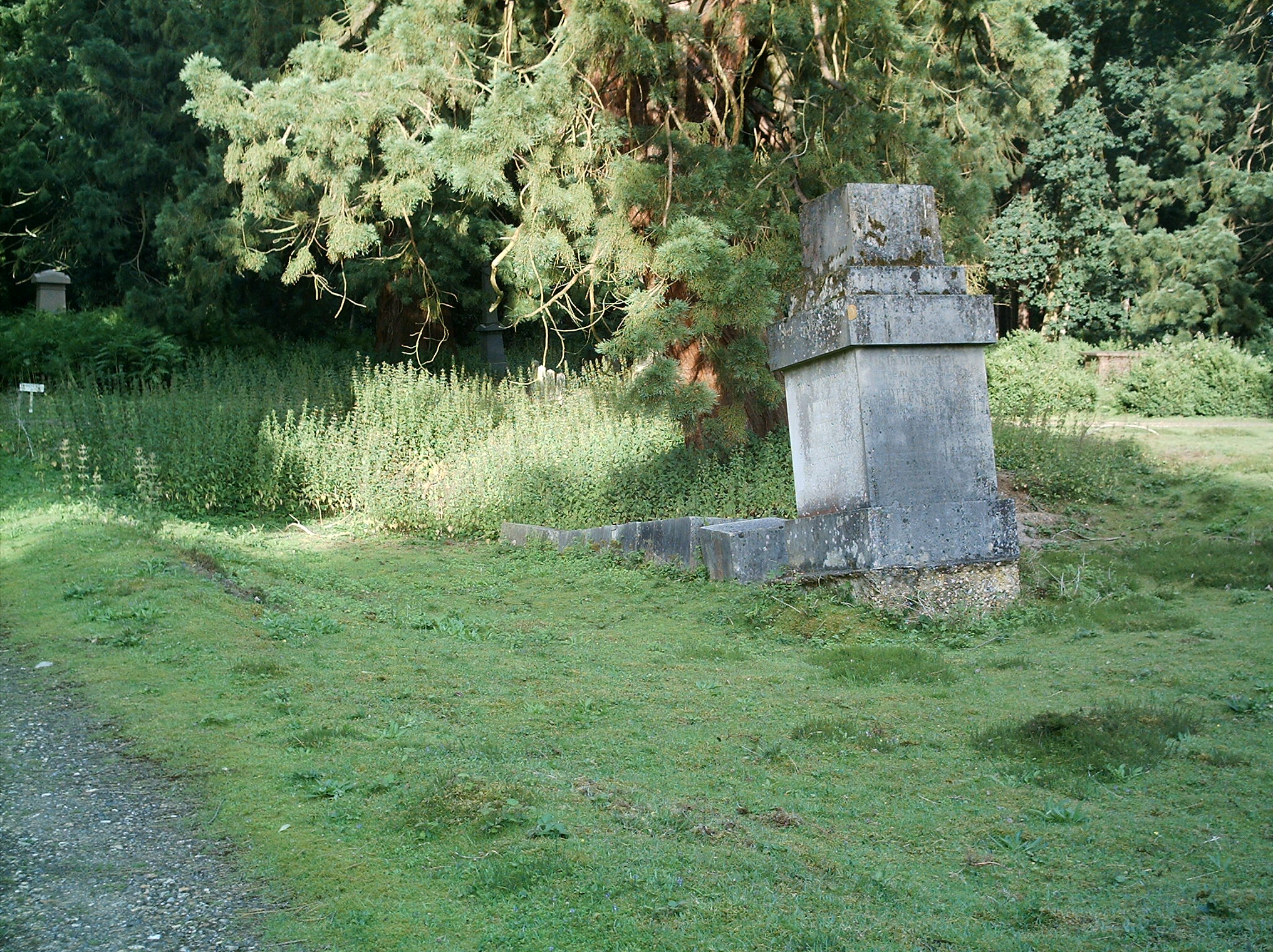
The fallen replica of the St George's Circus obelisk, in Brookwood Cemetery.

Following the construction of Waterloo Bridge, Waterloo Road was also cut through to terminate nearby, but this was not part of the original formal layout. Following the growth of nearby industry, and the construction of a railway viaducts by the London, Chatham and Dover Railway in the 1860s bringing noise and smoke pollution, the area become less popular as a middle class residential suburb. The surrounding streets contain a number of social housing estates constructed by the City of London Corporation and Peabody Trust, dating from the Victorian era to the 1950s.

St George's Circus was the location of a tube station on the abortive City and Brixton Railway, which was authorised by the City and Brixton Railway Act 1898 (61 & 62 Vict. c. lx) but which was never built.

The south side of the circus was originally occupied by the School for the Indigent Blind. This was reconstructed and enlarged in the 1830s, but subsequently moved out of London. The site is now occupied by a brick building of 1901 on the same scale as the adjacent terraces. This conceals the subsurface depot for London Underground's Bakerloo line.

In 1900 a replica of the obelisk was placed in Brookwood Cemetery to mark where human remains from the crypt of St George the Martyr Southwark were reburied in 1899. Located on St. George the Martyr Avenue in plot 81 in the South side of the cemetery, this replica has subsequently toppled due to the subsidence of the remains beneath it.

== Surroundings ==
To the north western side is McLaren House, a hall of residence for students of London South Bank University. The building was opened in 1996 and holds around 600 students. This ten-storey building replaced a derelict 1890s building that previously housed the Royal Eye Hospital.

In 2013, the property developer Barratt London purchased existing office blocks on the north eastern side of the junction, announcing plans for up to 400 new homes to replace the existing office buildings. The development was subsequently named Blackfriars Circus, reflecting its position on Blackfriars Road and St George's Circus. The development, designed by architects Maccreanor Lavington received a multitude of awards, including the RIBA National Award and RIBA London Award for 2021.

The area is now a conservation area, including a number of Georgian buildings that was part of the original development. Many of these had been allowed to deteriorate to a near-derelict state of repair, following their purchase by the London South Bank University for redevelopment plans that were subsequently abandoned, and were on the "buildings at risk" register. In 2007, facade repairs were completed to most of the buildings, although their long-term use remains unresolved. In 2013, the listed Victorian dwellings and the former Duke of Clarence public house on the southeast corner and down London Road were restored by London South Bank University and is now a business centre dedicated to supporting the university's graduates in creating new businesses.

From the north and clockwise, the following roads converge here:

- Blackfriars Road (A201); leading to Blackfriars Bridge
- Borough Road; with entry to Southwark Bridge Road leading to Southwark Bridge, and leading to Borough High Street and London Bridge
- London Road (A201), entry-only except for cycles and buses; leading to Elephant and Castle
- Lambeth Road (A3203), entry-only except for cycles; leading to Lambeth Bridge
- Westminster Bridge Road (A3202), exit-only for all traffic; leading to Westminster Bridge
- Waterloo Road (A301); leading to Waterloo Bridge
