= York Road, Lambeth =

Road in Lambeth, London

Coordinates: 51°30′10″N 0°6′58″W

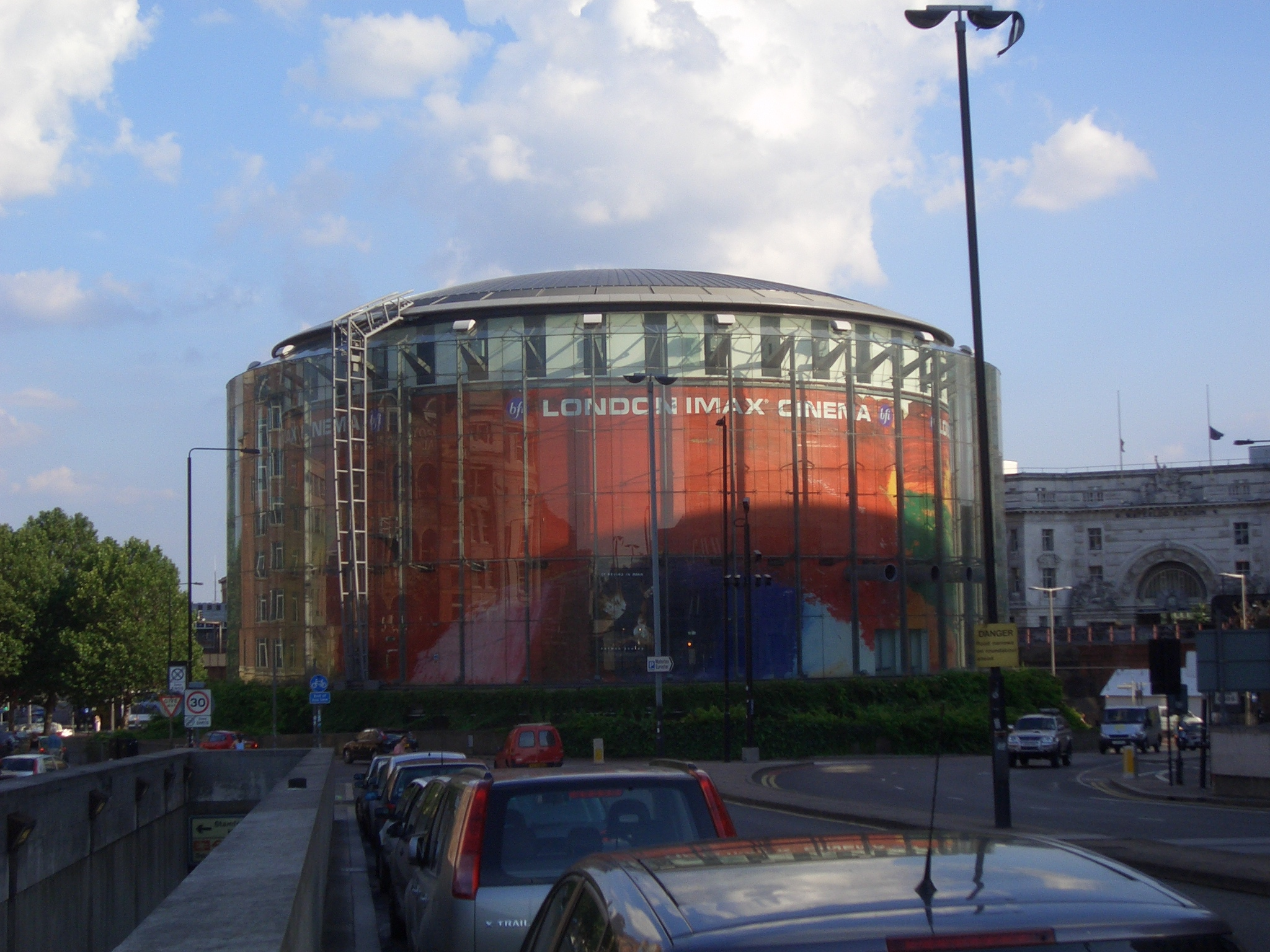
The London IMAX from the A301 Waterloo Bridge

York Road is a road in Lambeth, London, running between Westminster Bridge Road (south) and Waterloo Road (north). To the west is the old County Hall, Shell Centre, Jubilee Gardens and, beyond, the London Eye and the River Thames. Waterloo station is located on the road's eastern edge, as well as the former Waterloo International Eurostar terminal and General Lying-In Hospital. The London IMAX cinema is located within the Bullring roundabout at the northern end of the road, on a site previously occupied by Cardboard City for the homeless.

The road forms part of the A3200.
