= Cuper's Gardens =

Coordinates: 51°30′19″N 0°6′50″W

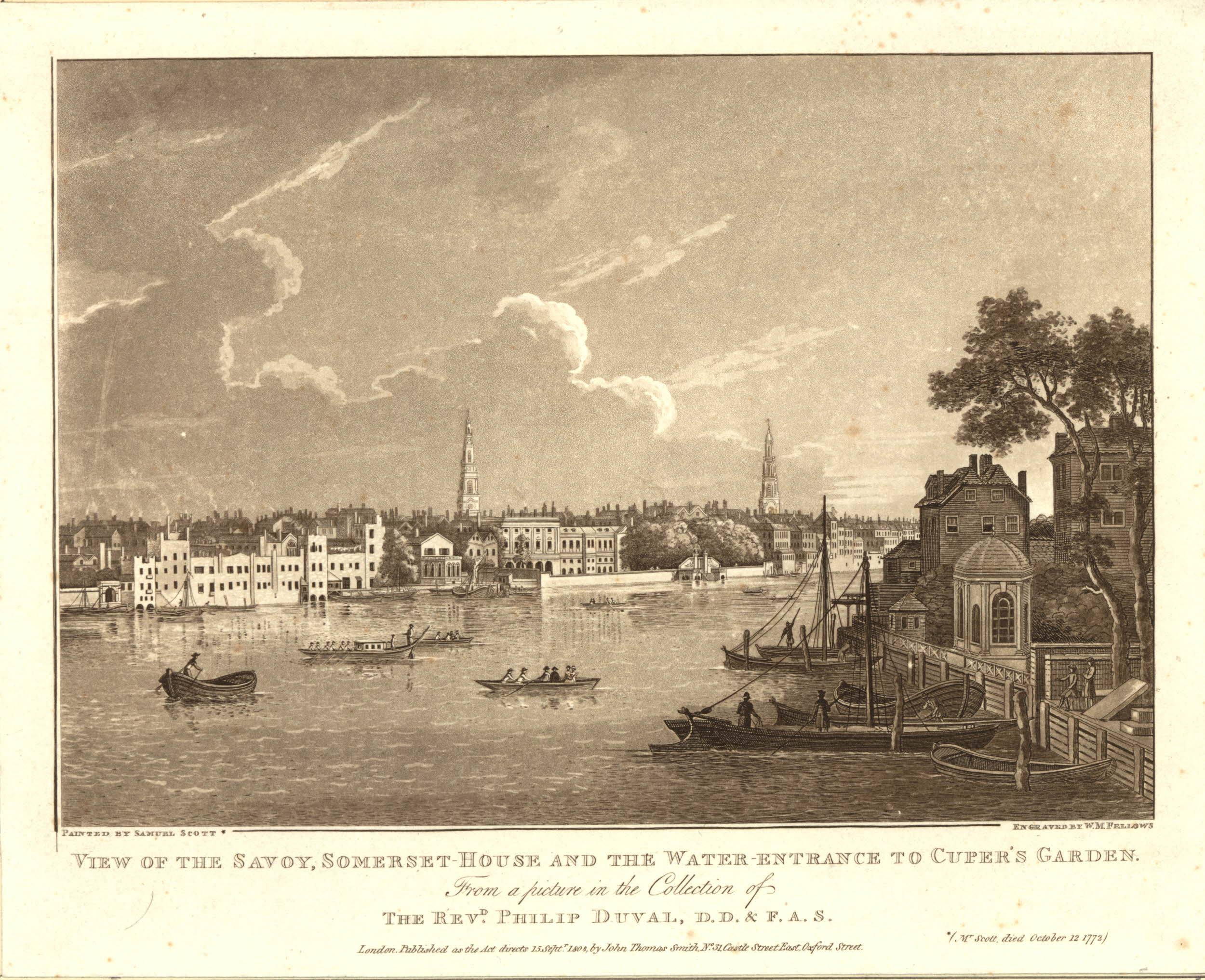
View of the Savoy, Somerset House and the Water Entrance to Cuper's Garden, 1808

Cuper's Gardens were 17th- and 18th-century pleasure gardens (or tea gardens) on the south side of the River Thames in Lambeth, London. The gardens looked over to Somerset House near Waterloo Bridge, and were centered on what is now the north end of Waterloo Road.

In 1643, Thomas Howard, 21st Earl of Arundel bought 3 acres (1.2 ha) of land which he leased to his gardener Abraham Boydell Cuper. The gardens opened in the 1680s and were named after the original proprietor. They were also known as Cupid's Gardens. In 1686, 7 acres (2.8 ha) of adjoining land was bought from the Archbishop of Canterbury, William Sancroft, and added to the gardens. A long landing stage in the river known as Cuper's Bridge acted as a popular entrance for the gardens.

In 1736, an orchestra was included among the attractions. It also became known for its firework displays. However, it lost its license in 1753 due to the loose morals of its visitors. It remained open as an unlicensed tea garden before finally closing in 1760.

== See also ==
- Vauxhall Gardens
