= The Cut, London =

Street in London, England

Coordinates: 51°30′12.3″N 0°6′24.6″W

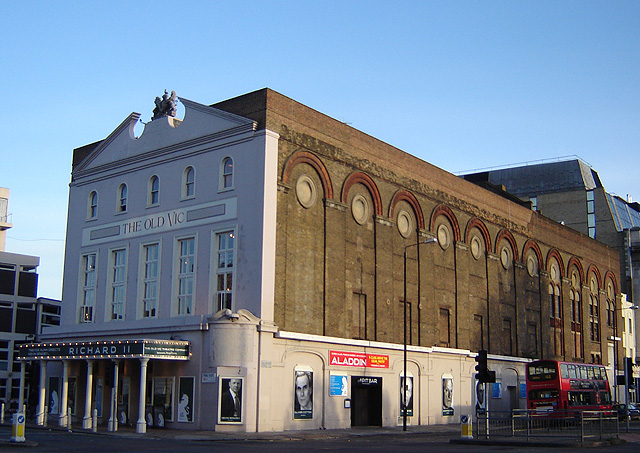
The Old Vic theatre, at the western end of the Cut in Lambeth

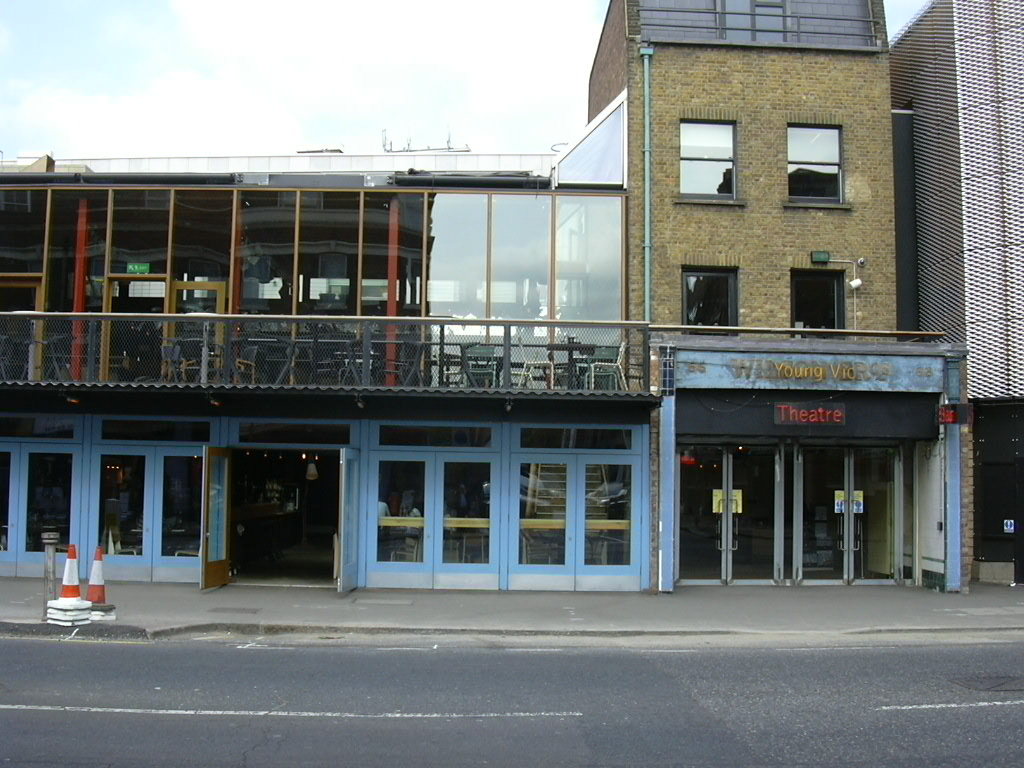
The Young Vic theatre, halfway along the northern side of the Cut

The Cut (formerly New Cut) is a street in London which runs between Waterloo Road in Lambeth and Blackfriars Road in Southwark, approximately parallel to the South Eastern Railway. The Old Vic theatre is at the western (Lambeth) end, and the more experimental Young Vic theatre halfway along on the other side. Lewisham Southwark College is sited on the south side of the Cut and at the eastern (Southwark) end is Southwark Underground station. Waterloo and Waterloo East stations are also nearby.

== Street market ==
Lower Marsh and the Cut formed the commercial heart of the area from the early 19th century. Henry Mayhew estimated in the 1840s that 300 costermongers attended the market here. He described the scene in his work London Labour and the London Poor:

THE LONDON STREET MARKETS ON A SATURDAY NIGHT.

The street sellers are to be seen in the greatest numbers at the London street markets on a Saturday night. Here, and in the shops immediately adjoining, the working-classes generally purchase their Sunday's dinner ... on Saturday night, or early on Sunday morning, the New-cut, and the Brill in particular, is almost impassable.

Indeed, the scene in these parts has more of the character of a fair than a market. There are hundreds of stalls, and every stall has its one or two lights ... these, with the sparkling ground-glass globes of the tea-dealers' shops, and the butchers' gaslights streaming and fluttering in the wind, like flags of flame, pour forth such a flood of light, that at a distance the atmosphere immediately above the spot is as lurid as if the street were on fire. ...

This stall is green and white with bunches of turnips—that red with apples, the next yellow with onions, and another purple with pickling cabbages. One minute you pass a man with an umbrella turned inside up and full of prints; next, you hear one with a peepshow of Mazeppa, and Paul Jones the pirate, describing the pictures to the boys looking in at the little round windows. Then is heard the sharp snap of the percussion-cap from the crowd of lads firing at the target for nuts; and the moment afterwards, you see either a black man half-clad in white, and shivering in the cold with tracts in his hand, or else you hear the sounds of music from Frazier's Circus ... Such, indeed, is the riot, the struggle, and the scramble for a living, that the confusion and uproar of the New-cut on Saturday night have a bewildering and saddening effect upon the thoughtful mind.

The fortunes of the street market changed rapidly with time. In 1851 Mayhew wrote: "Since the above description was written, the New Cut has lost much of its noisy and brilliant glory. In consequence of a New Police regulation, "stands" or "pitches" have been forbidden, and each coster, on a market night, is now obliged, under pain of the lock-up house, to carry his tray, or keep moving with his barrow. The gay stalls have been replaced by deal boards, some sodden With wet fish, others stained purple with blackberries, or brown with walnut-peel; and the bright lamps are almost totally superseded by the dim, guttering candle. Even the pole under the tray or "shallow" is resting on the ground, the policeman on duty is obliged to interfere. The mob of purchasers has diminished one-half; and instead of the road being filled with customers and trucks, the pavement and kerb-stones are scarcely crowded."

The market in the Cut continued until the 1950s, when the street was designated as the B300 thoroughfare between Borough High Street and Westminster Bridge Road; the remaining traders moved to Lower Marsh where some street stalls continue (to 2019), or to new shops rebuilt on the bombed sites.

A boxing gymnasium situated above a pub on the Cut is alleged to be where the modern rules for the sport of boxing were penned. The street is also now home to a range of restaurants, shops and offices.
