= Westminster Bridge Road =

Road in London, England

Coordinates: 51°29′54″N 0°06′29″W

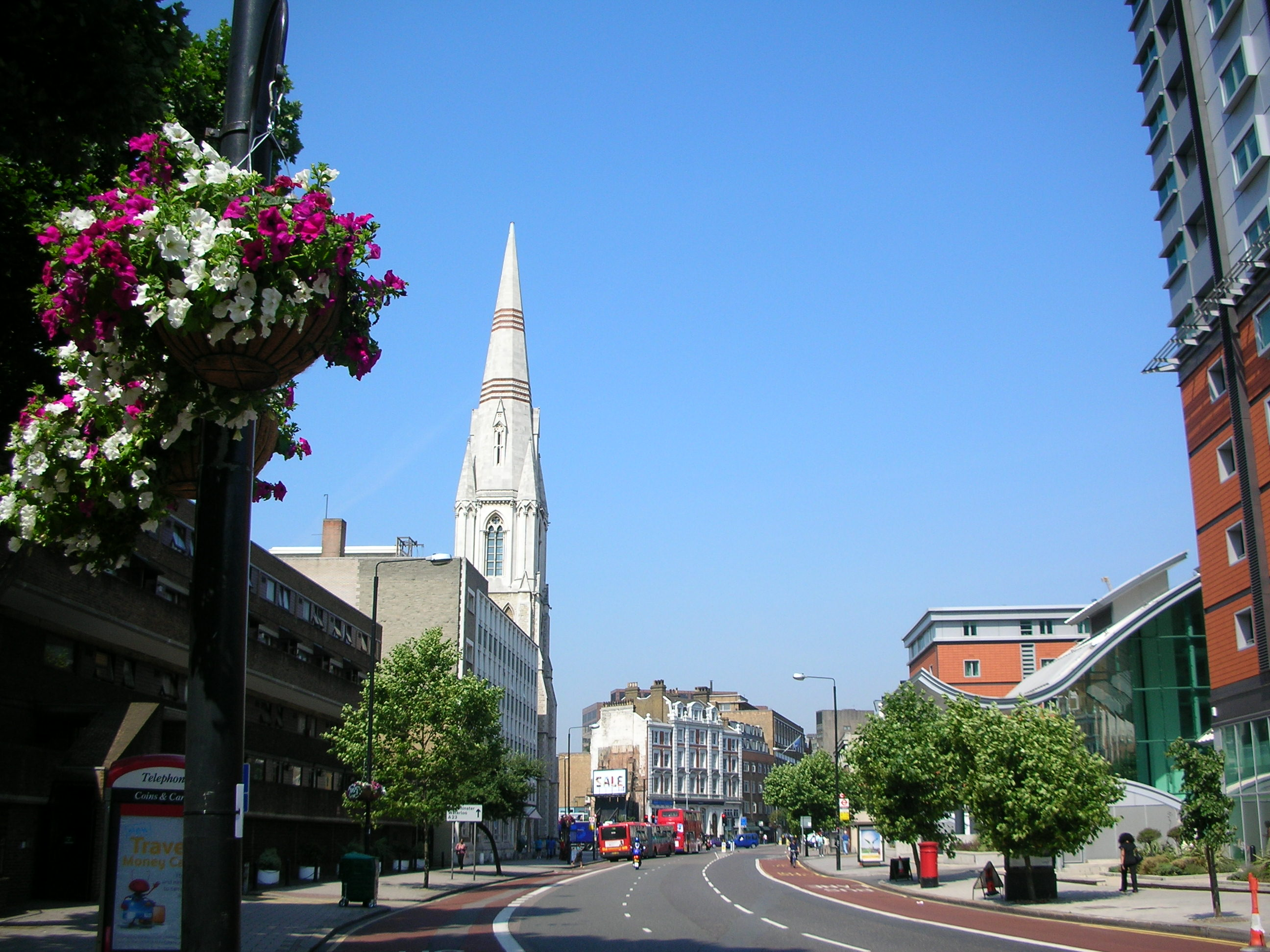
Looking west along Westminster Bridge Road, with the spire of Christ Church on the left and The Perspective Building (designed by Assael Architecture) on the right

Westminster Bridge Road is a road in London, England. It is on an east–west axis, and passes through the northern extremities of the boroughs of Lambeth and Southwark.

Between 1740 and 1746, the Commissioners of Westminster Bridge bought land from the Archbishop of Canterbury and ground in Lambeth Marsh from the Lord Mayor and Commonalty of the City of London for the approach to the bridge on the southern side (which at that time was in Surrey). This was the start of Westminster Bridge Road.

== The route ==
From its western end, the road begins as the A302 on the east side of the County Hall roundabout, where Westminster Bridge, York Road and the A3036 Lambeth Palace Road meet.

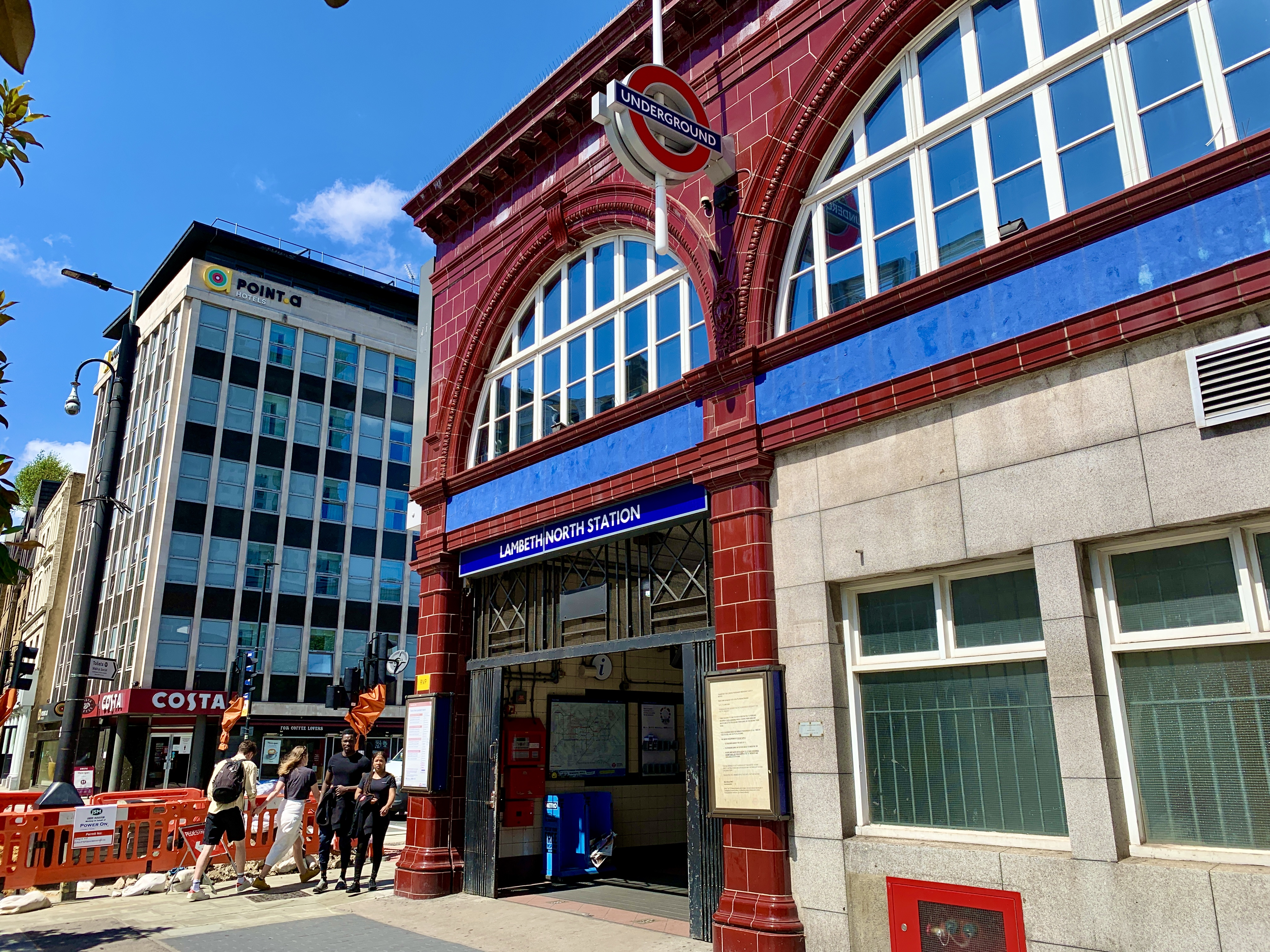
Lambeth North tube station on Westminster Bridge Road

The road then passes beneath the railway viaduct south of Waterloo station and intersects with Lower Marsh and Upper Marsh before reaching the junction at Lambeth North Underground station. The station opened on 10 March 1906 as Kennington Road, was renamed Westminster Bridge Road in July 1906, and received its present name, Lambeth North, in April 1917. At this junction, Baylis Road, Hercules Road and the A23 branch off, the last continuing south as Kennington Road. The intersection was formerly known as Asylum Circus because of its proximity to the Bethlem Royal Hospital, which occupied from 1815 to 1930 the building now used by the Imperial War Museum, about 0.3 miles southeast on Lambeth Road.

The route continues as the A3202 and turns east-northeast as it enters the St George's one-way system, where traffic, including cycles, flows eastbound only. It ends at St George's Circus, where Waterloo Road, Blackfriars Road, Borough Road, London Road and Lambeth Road converge.

The western section of the road was originally numbered as part of the A23. That road now begins at Lambeth North tube station and no longer includes Westminster Bridge Road.

== Places of interest ==
The Florence Nightingale Museum is at the west end of the street, within the grounds of St Thomas' Hospital.

Between 1964 and 1994 the office block at 100 Westminster Bridge Road, then known as Century House, was home to the UK's overseas intelligence agency, the Secret Intelligence Service (SIS), more commonly known as MI6. The building was refurbished and converted into the residential Perspective Building, designed by Assael Architecture, in 2001.

The Lincoln Memorial Tower, built by Christopher Newman Hall in the late 19th century in memory of Abraham Lincoln and the Emancipation Proclamation, stands close to the junction with Kennington Road.

The Roman Catholic St George's Cathedral, Southwark, is between Westminster Bridge Road and St George's Road, the frontage to the diocesan offices being on Westminster Bridge Road. Morley College, an adult education college, is located on the road, and so is the associated Morley Gallery.

=== Former public buildings/landmarks ===
Remaining visible

The London Necropolis Railway rebuilt its urban terminus in 1902, moving it to Westminster Bridge Road. The station was bombed in the London Blitz in 1941 and subsequently closed. Its entrance remains intact at 121 Westminster Bridge Road.

Entirely replaced

The Canterbury Music Hall stood at 143 Westminster Bridge Road, commissioned by Charles Morton in 1852 when it was built adjacent to the Canterbury Tavern. It was destroyed by Second World War bombing in 1942.

The later Gatti's-in-the-Road music hall opposite was commissioned by Carlo Gatti and opened in 1865. It later became a cinema and, after being badly damaged in the Second World War, was demolished in 1950.

Astley's Amphitheatre was a performance venue that once stood at 225 Westminster Bridge Road. It was opened in 1773, was burned and rebuilt several times, and was finally demolished in 1893.

The Overseas Development Institute's office was on Westminster Bridge Road until 2019, when it moved to Blackfriars Road.
