= Soho Society (book) =

2008 album-format book

- Author: Bernie Katz
- Illustrator: Damien Hirst; Tracey Emin; Sam Taylor-Wood
- Cover artist: Peter Blake
- Subject: London, Soho
- Genre: Autobiography
- Set in: London
- Publisher: Quartet Books
- Publication date: 2008

Soho Society is a 2008 album-format book by Bernie Katz, long-time maitre d' at London's Groucho Club. It was published by Quartet, with a foreword by Stephen Fry. In addition to Katz's personal reminiscences of Soho characters and culture, the book contains nearly twenty illustrations by celebrated artists such as Damien Hirst, Tracey Emin and Sam Taylor-Wood, most of whom were personal friends of Katz and contributed their work for free. The book's front cover featured artwork by Sir Peter Blake.

== Background ==
Katz served as 'front-of-house' at the Groucho Club on Dean Street for 18 years and acted as gatekeeper for a venue once called 'the A-list crowd's favourite stomping ground.

Outside of The Groucho, the book also covers Katz's off-duty wanderings and encounters in Soho haunts such as Soho House, Blacks and Bar Italia.

Stephen Fry, a collector of Soho literature, said that he had despaired of ever hearing a new voice who really understood Soho, bur Bernie Katz' collection of stories had made him happy.
