= Lambeth North tube station =

London Underground station

Lambeth North
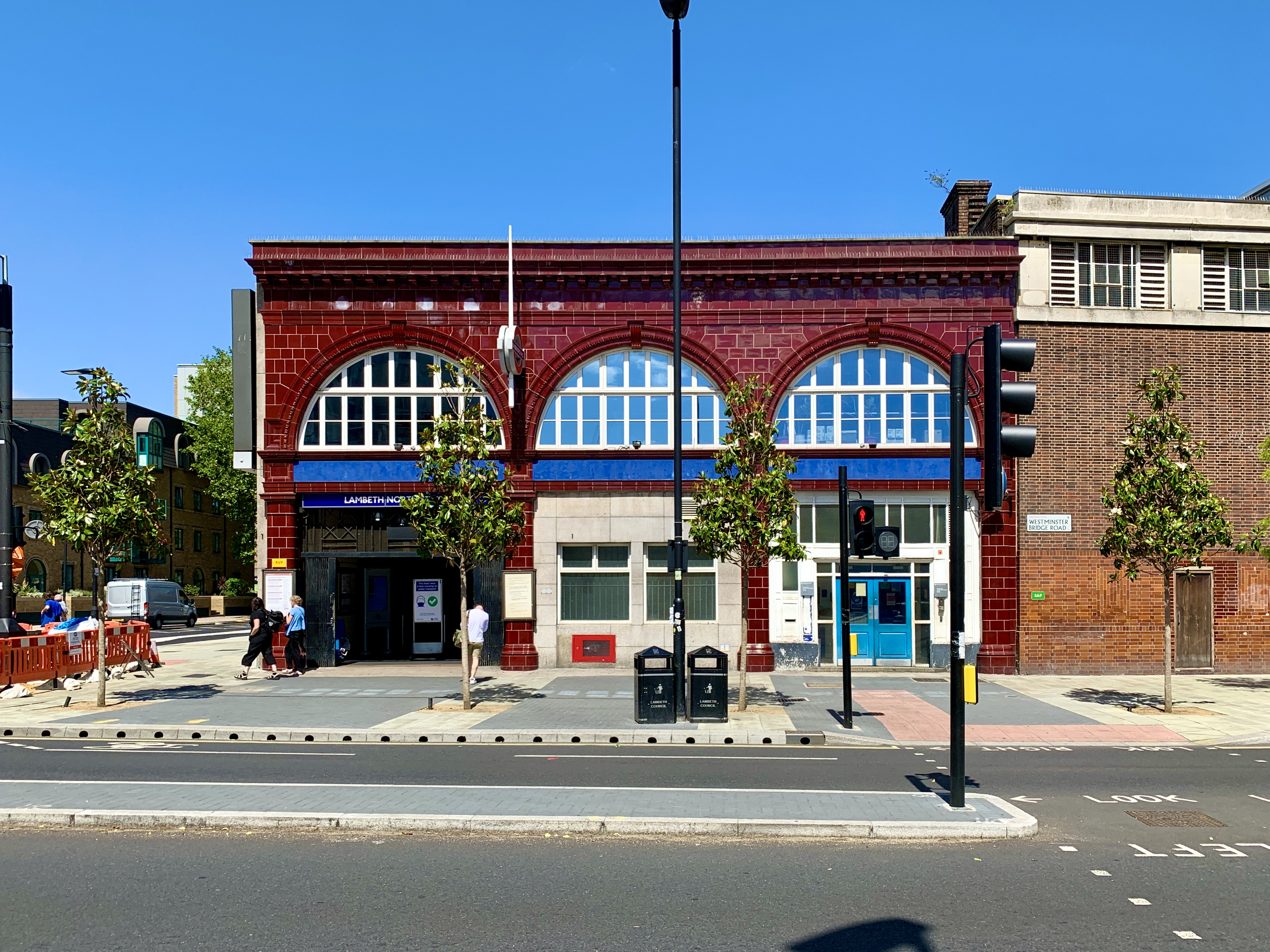
- Station entrance
- Interactive map of Lambeth North

General information
- Location: Lambeth
- Local authority: London Borough of Lambeth
- Managed by: London Underground
- Number of platforms: 2
- Fare zone: 1

London Underground annual entry and exit
- 2021: ▲1.29 million
- 2022: ▲2.57 million
- 2023: ▲2.69 million
- 2024: ▼2.61 million
- 2025: ▼2.58 million

Railway companies
- Original company: Baker Street and Waterloo Railway

Key dates
- 10 March 1906: Opened as Kennington Road
- 5 August 1906: Renamed Westminster Bridge Road
- 15 April 1917: Renamed Lambeth (North)
- c. 1928: Renamed Lambeth North

Other information
- External links: TfL station info page
- Coordinates: 51.499°N 0.1118°W

Lambeth North is a London Underground station in the district of Lambeth, located at the junction of Westminster Bridge Road and Baylis Road. It is the penultimate station on the Bakerloo line between Waterloo and Elephant & Castle stations, and is in London fare zone 1. It is the nearest tube station to exit for the Imperial War Museum. In 2017, it was ranked the least-used Underground station in zone 1.

== History ==
Designed by Leslie Green, the station was opened by the Baker Street & Waterloo Railway on 10 March 1906, with the name Kennington Road. It served as the temporary southern terminus of the line until 5 August 1906, when Elephant & Castle station was opened. The station's name was changed to Westminster Bridge Road in July 1906 and it was again renamed, to Lambeth (North), in April 1917, and then to Lambeth North in 1928.

At 03:56 on 16 January 1941, a German "Satan" 1800 kg general-purpose bomb hit a hostel at nearby 92 Westminster Bridge Road. The shock wave severely damaged the southbound platform tunnel injuring 28 people sheltering there, one of whom died in hospital 15 days later. Thirty-seven rings of the damaged tunnel had to be completely replaced, 15 partially replaced, and 86 feet (26 m) of platform rebuilt. Traffic through the station resumed after 95 days.

The station closed for maintenance works in July 2016, and reopened in February 2017.

== Layout ==
There are two tracks in separate tunnels. The station has two lifts and a spiral staircase connecting the street level to platform level (about 70 feet (21 m) below). Immediately north of the station is a crossover enabling trains to terminate at either platform. This is necessary for trains that are stabled at the London Road Depot, which can be seen on London Road at St George's Circus, and connects with the northbound Bakerloo line north of the station. Southbound trains destined for the depot must use the crossover. The Northern line does not serve the station but only passes beneath it.

== Services ==
Lambeth North station is on the Bakerloo line in London fare zone 1. It is between Waterloo to the north and Elephant & Castle to the south. The typical service pattern in trains per hour (tph) is:

- 4 tph to Harrow & Wealdstone via Queens Park & Stonebridge Park (Northbound)
- 4 tph to Stonebridge Park via Queens Park (Northbound)
- 8 tph to Queens Park (Northbound)
- 16 tph to Elephant and Castle (Southbound)

Preceding station	London Underground	Following station
Waterloo towards Harrow & Wealdstone	Bakerloo line	Elephant & Castle Terminus

== Connections ==
Various day and nighttime London Buses routes serve the station.
