= Lower Marsh =

Street in Waterloo, London

Coordinates: 51.5009°N 0.1127°W

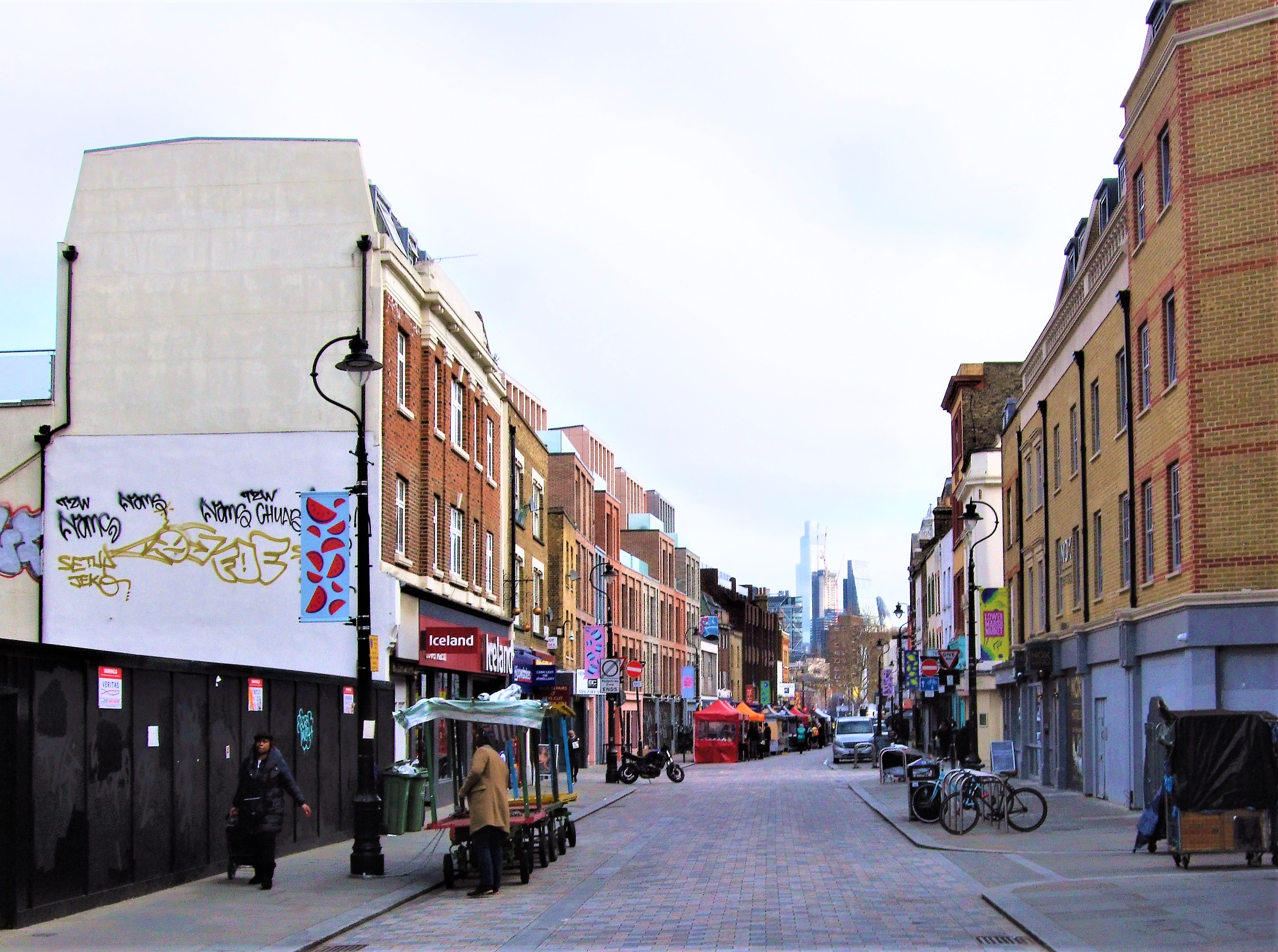

- Location within Greater London
- London borough: Lambeth
- Ceremonial county: Greater London
- Region: London
- Country: England
- Sovereign state: United Kingdom
- Post town: LONDON
- Postcode district: SE1
- Dialling code: 020
- Police: Metropolitan
- Fire: London
- Ambulance: London
- UK Parliament: Vauxhall and Camberwell Green
- London Assembly: Lambeth and Southwark

Lower Marsh is a street in the Waterloo neighbourhood of London, England. It is adjacent to Waterloo railway station in the London Borough of Lambeth. It is the location of Lower Marsh Market.

== History ==
Until the early 19th century much of north Lambeth (now known as the South Bank) was marsh. The settlement of Lambeth Marsh was built on a raised through road over the marsh lands, potentially dating back to Roman times. The land on which it stands was owned by the church of England, with Lambeth Palace nearby. Records and maps show that it was a separate village until the early 19th Century when the church sold off the land in small pockets, thereby leading to random development of individual houses rather than the grander redevelopments occurring north of the river. Lower Marsh and The Cut formed the commercial heart of the area from the early 19th century.

The northern tip of the ancient parish of Lambeth was a marshland known as Lambeth Marshe, but it was drained in the 18th century and is remembered in the Lower Marsh street name. Sometime after the opening of Waterloo railway station in 1848 the locality around the station and Lower Marsh became known as Waterloo.

Previously regarded as a comparatively run-down location, Lower Marsh has more recently undergone gentrification, supported by private enterprise and injections of capital from Lambeth and Southwark councils.

The street has been home to Lower Marsh Market since the mid-nineteenth century and has, as of 2015, 77 stalls. The street also has a variety of vintage shops, pubs, bookshops, art galleries, independent coffee spaces and restaurants, featuring food from many ethnic origins.
