= Southern Crossrail =

Proposed railway in London, England

For the lines through London also called 'Crossrail' see Crossrail and Crossrail 2

Southern Crossrail is a privately proposed rail link between Waterloo and Waterloo East. The plans would see a direct link between the South Eastern Mainline and South West Mainline and would involve the reinstatement of the link between Waterloo and the line to Charing Cross. It also suggests the closure of Waterloo East and Charing Cross stations and a new interchange station with the London Underground at Southwark. These plans do not fit with Network Rail's current plans for Waterloo.
