= Southwark tube station =

London Underground station

Southwark
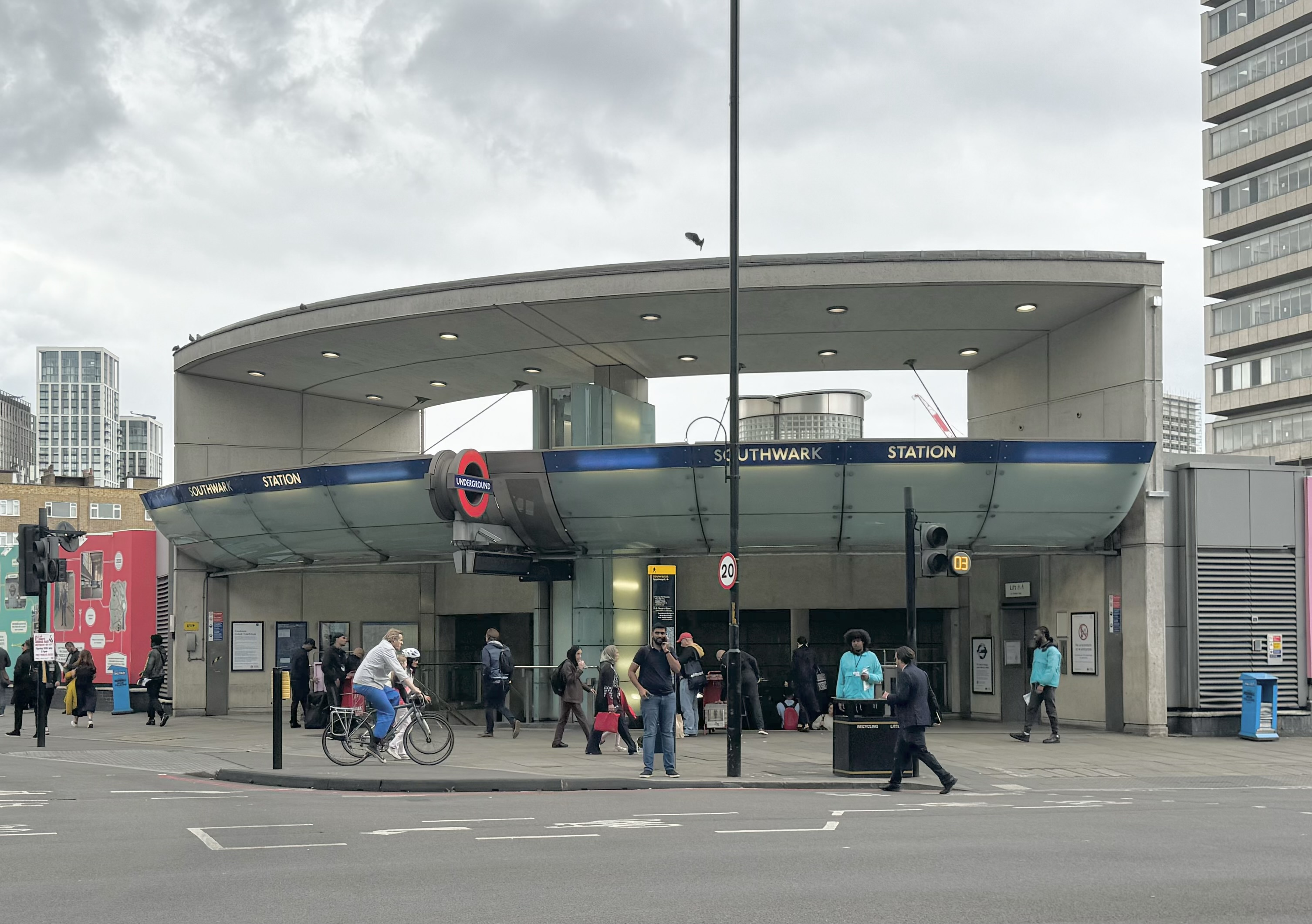
- Main station entrance, July 2024
- Interactive map of Southwark

General information
- Location: Bankside
- Local authority: London Borough of Southwark
- Managed by: London Underground
- Number of platforms: 2
- Accessible: Yes
- Fare zone: 1
- OSI: Waterloo East; Blackfriars at Bankside entrance

London Underground annual entry and exit
- 2021: ▲5.03 million
- 2022: ▲8.92 million
- 2023: ▼8.51 million
- 2024: ▲8.72 million
- 2025: ▼8.58 million

Railway companies
- Original company: London Regional Transport

Key dates
- 20 November 1999: Opened

Listed status
- Listed feature: Station (including Waterloo East interchange)
- Listing grade: II
- Entry number: 1491631
- Added to list: 10 November 2025

Other information
- External links: TfL station info page
- Coordinates: 51.5039°N 0.1050°W

Southwark (/ˈsʌðərk/) is a London Underground station. It is located in the London Borough of Southwark at the corner of Blackfriars Road and The Cut. The station is on the Jubilee line, between Waterloo and London Bridge stations. It is in London fare zone 1.

The station was opened on 20 November 1999 as part of the Jubilee Line Extension. It is Grade II listed.

== History ==
The original plan for the Jubilee Line Extension did not include a station between those at Waterloo and London Bridge; Southwark station was added after lobbying by the local council as well as North Southwark and Bermondsey MP Simon Hughes.

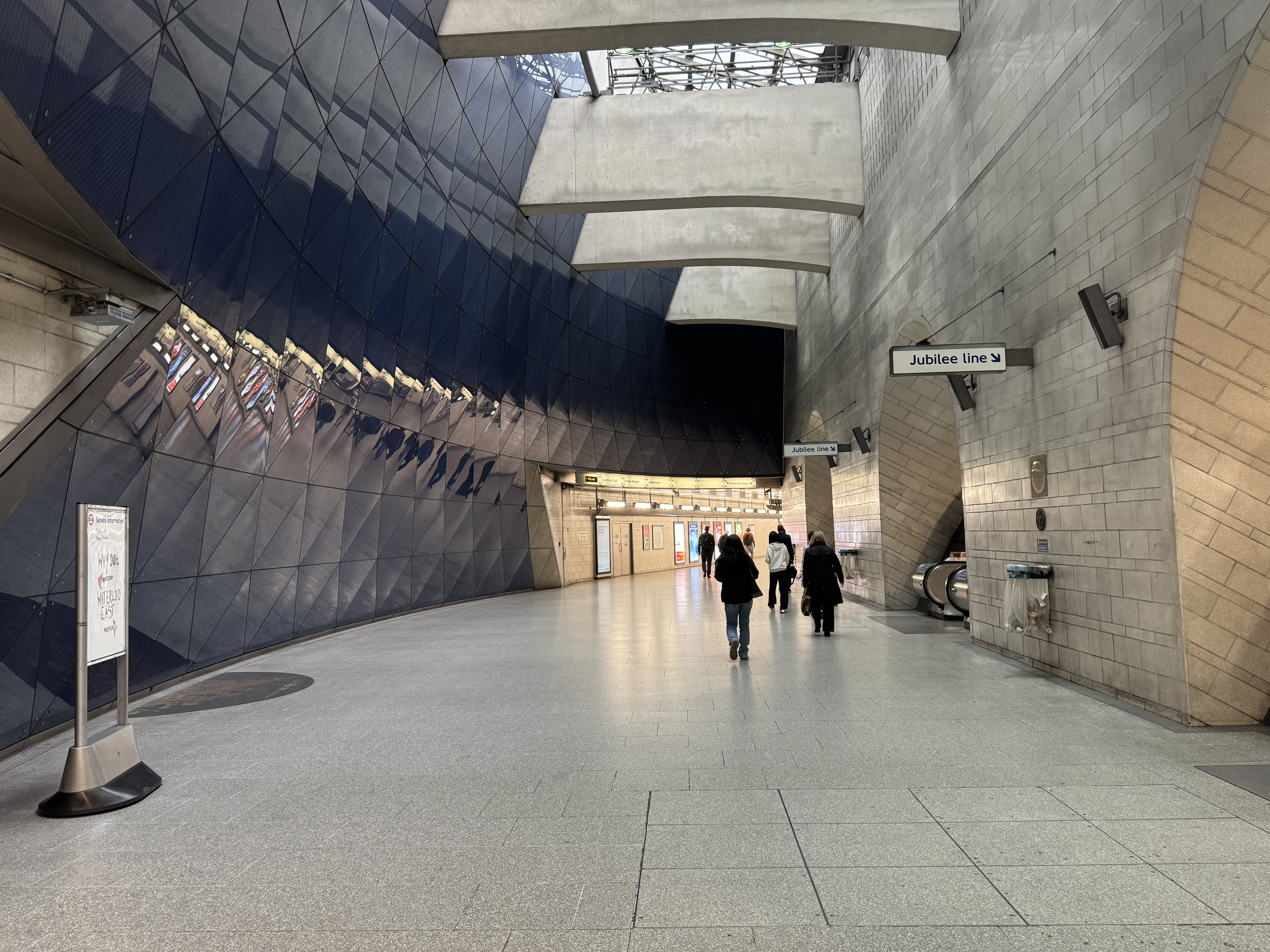
The concourse leading to Waterloo East and the escalators to the Jubilee line platforms, July 2024

The architects MacCormac, Jamieson, Prichard were appointed in January 1991 by the Jubilee Line Extension design team led by Roland Paoletti. Planning approval for the station was given in 1992, with the contract to build the station and adjacent tunnels awarded to a joint venture of Aoki Corporation and Soletanche in November 1993 at a cost of £64 million. Construction began in 1994, with tunnelling beginning in April 1995.

Built on a cramped site, with its platforms underneath the Victorian main line viaduct between Waterloo East and London Bridge stations, the station presented significant technical and architectural difficulties which were resolved by constructing two concourses at different levels. Substantial compensation grouting was required to stabilise the railway viaducts. The station opened with the final phase of the Jubilee Line Extension on 20 November 1999.

== Design ==
The station was designed by Sir Richard MacCormac of MacCormac, Jamieson, Prichard. Jubilee Line Extension project director Hugh Doherty called the station a "remarkable feat of engineering".

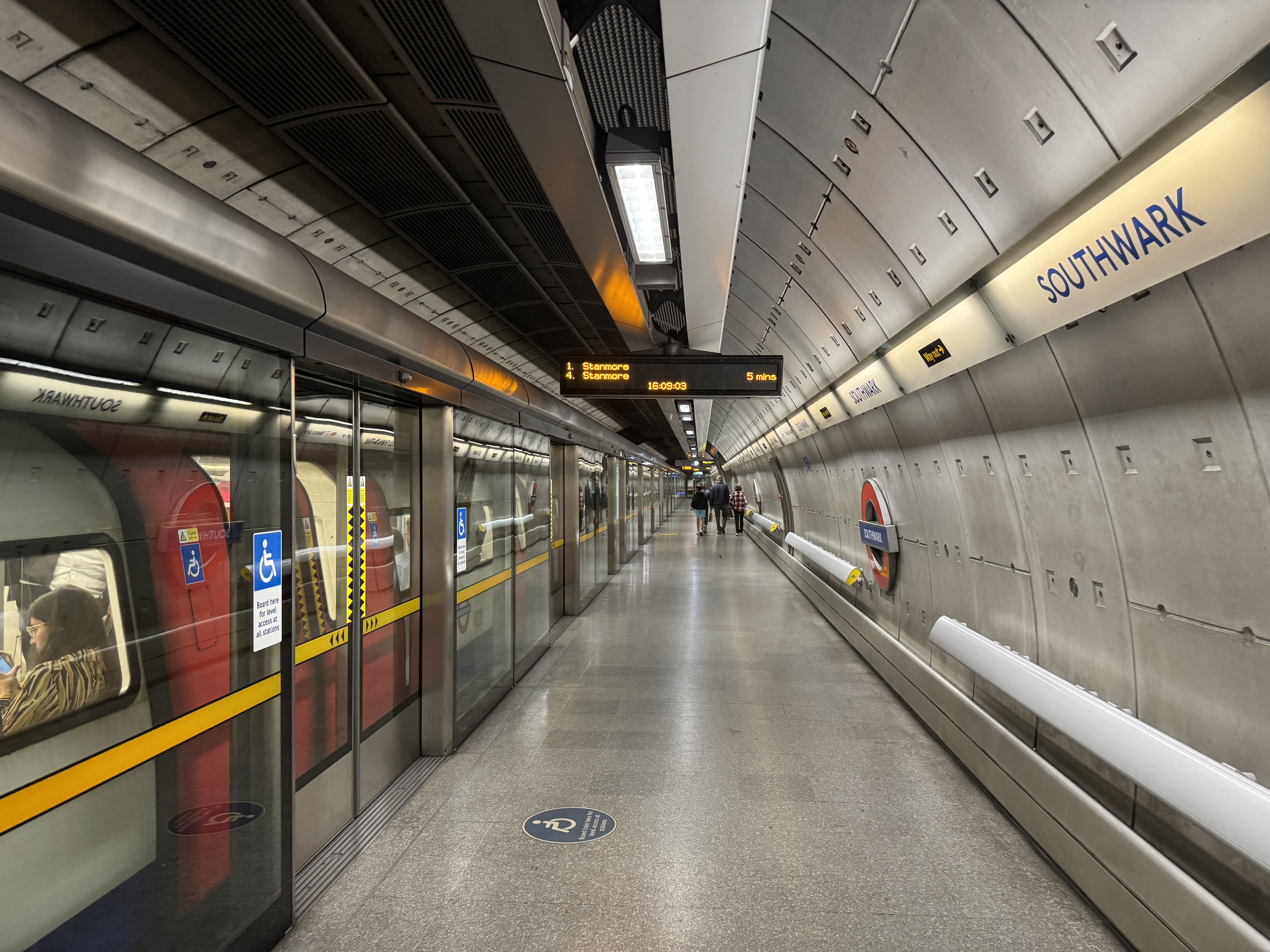
The Jubilee line westbound platform, July 2024

The upper concourse is the centrepiece of the station. It is a space 16 metres (52 ft) high with a glass roof that allows daylight to enter deep into the station. It is faced with a spectacular glass wall, 40 metres (130 ft) long, consisting of 660 specially cut pieces of blue glass, which was designed by the artist Alexander Beleschenko. MacCormac said the design of this and the lower concourse was inspired by a stage set design by 19th-century Prussian architect Karl Friedrich Schinkel for The Magic Flute. The wall is one of the extension's more celebrated architectural features, winning critical approval and a number of awards.

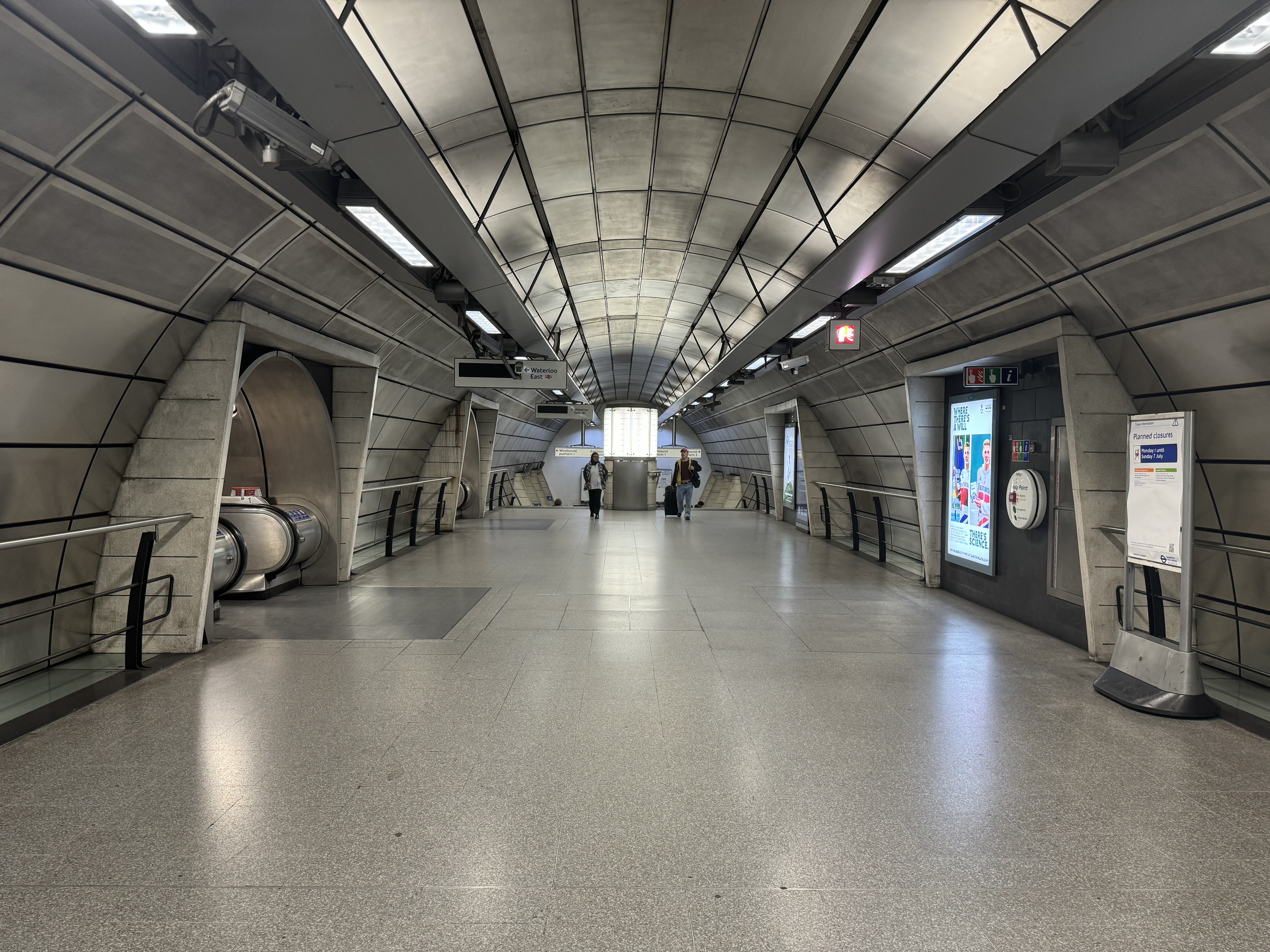
The concourse leading to the Jubilee line platforms, July 2024

The two platforms have platform screen doors which are meant to prevent passengers or debris from falling onto the tracks. They are connected at each end to the lower concourse which is a simple tunnel between the platforms and is illuminated by glass and steel "beacons" at each end, and is faced with stainless steel panels, deliberately left unpolished. Stairs lead up to a section of high floor in the central area of the tunnel, from where three narrow tube-like escalator shafts lead sideways (south) to the higher concourse. One end of the higher concourse connects to Waterloo East station, and the other end to the station's modest low-rise entrance building which is intended as a base for a future commercial development.

In 2000, the station was awarded a Royal Institute of British Architects Bronze medal, as well as being named Royal Fine Arts Commission/British Sky Broadcasting Building of the Year. The entire station, including the Waterloo East interchange, was Grade II listed on 10 November 2025.

== Location ==
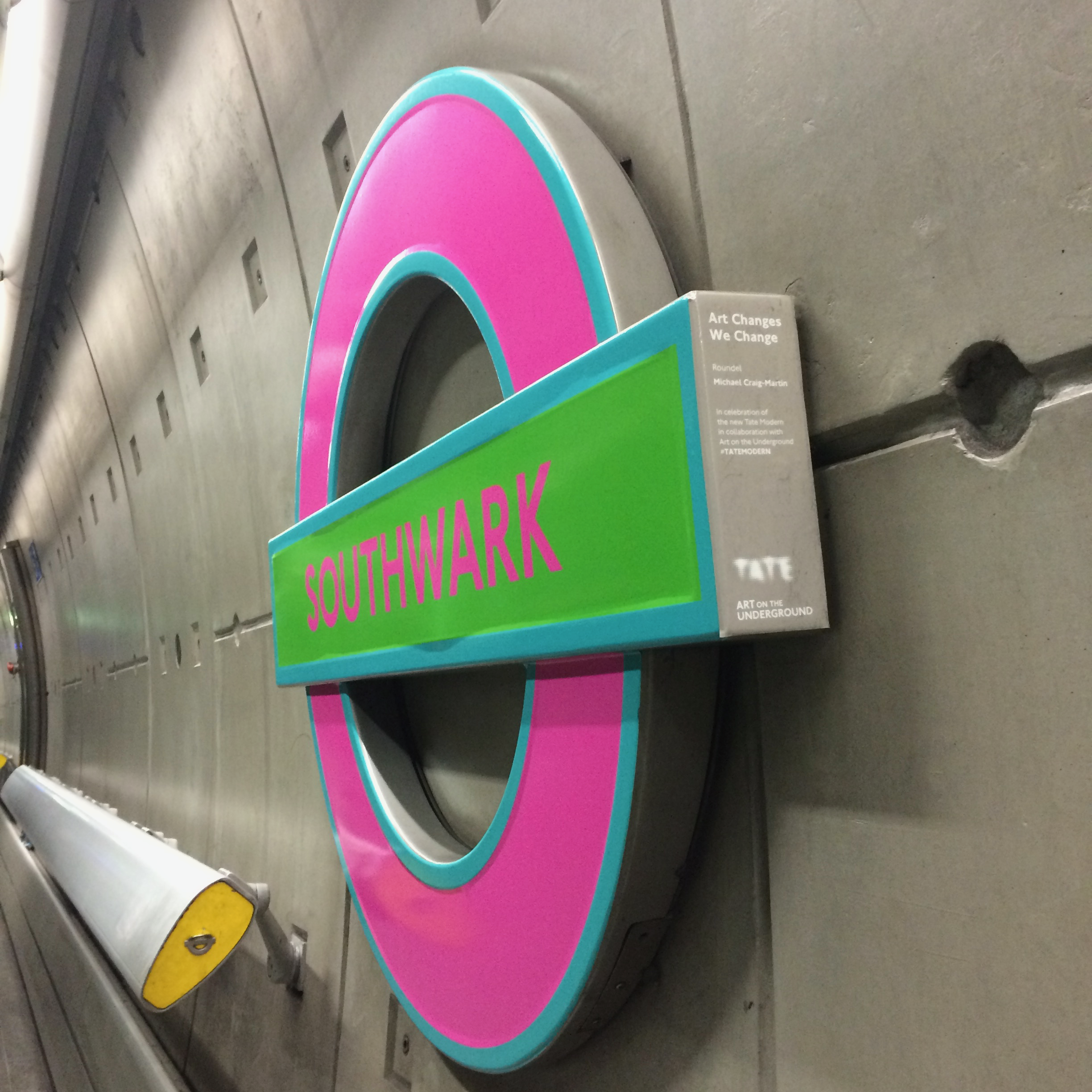
New roundel design by Michael Craig-Martin in celebration of the new Tate Modern in collaboration with Art on the Underground

It is somewhat west of historic Southwark, which is served by Borough and London Bridge stations. Its entrance is across the road from the disused Blackfriars Road railway station. Nearby attractions are Shakespeare's Globe, Young Vic and Old Vic theatres and the Tate Modern.

Although it is close to Waterloo, not near the Bankside attractions it was intended to serve, and its only National Rail interchange is to London Waterloo East main line station; the passenger usage matches those of other minor central stations. It does however get over twice the traffic of nearby Borough station, and around three times that of Lambeth North.

Day and nighttime London Buses routes serve that station.

Preceding station	London Underground	Following station
Waterloo towards Stanmore	Jubilee line	London Bridge towards Stratford
