= Stamford Street =

Street in London

Coordinates: 51.5066°N 0.1092°W

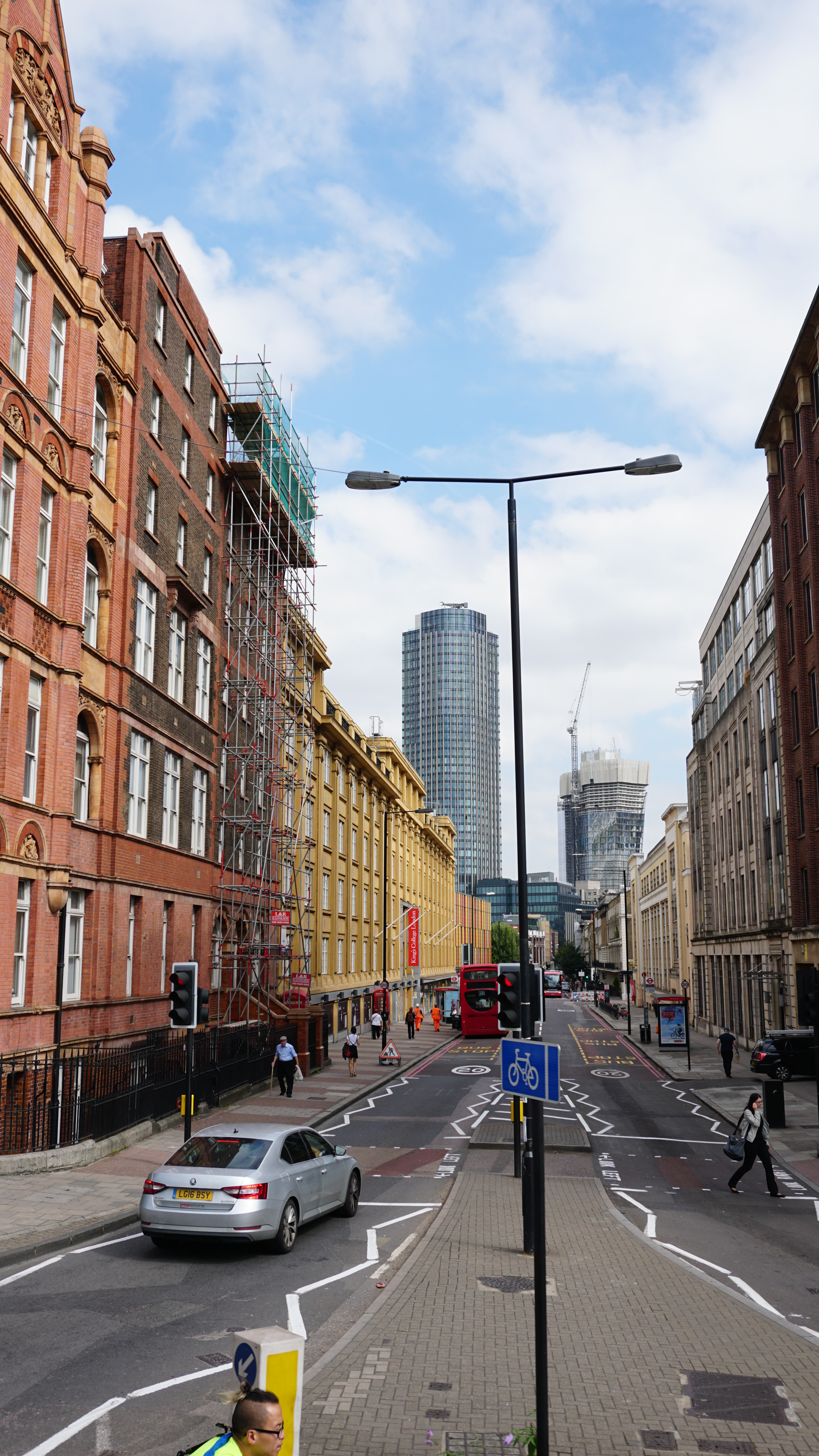
Stamford Street from Waterloo Road in 2016.

Stamford Street is a street in Lambeth and Southwark, London, England, just south of the River Thames. It runs between Waterloo Road to the west and Blackfriars Road to the east. It forms part of the A3200.

The street has a wide variety of buildings. There are two large Georgian terraces, a school and the entrance to a chapel from the 1820s; a Victorian bank and hotel; an Edwardian hospital now used for student accommodation; early 20th century industrial buildings now forming the Waterloo campus of King's College London; office buildings from the 1930s and 70s; housing co-operatives from the 1980s and 90s; and a 21st-century residential tower with a second one planned.

At the western end, in the middle of a large roundabout, is the British Film Institute London IMAX Cinema.

== History ==
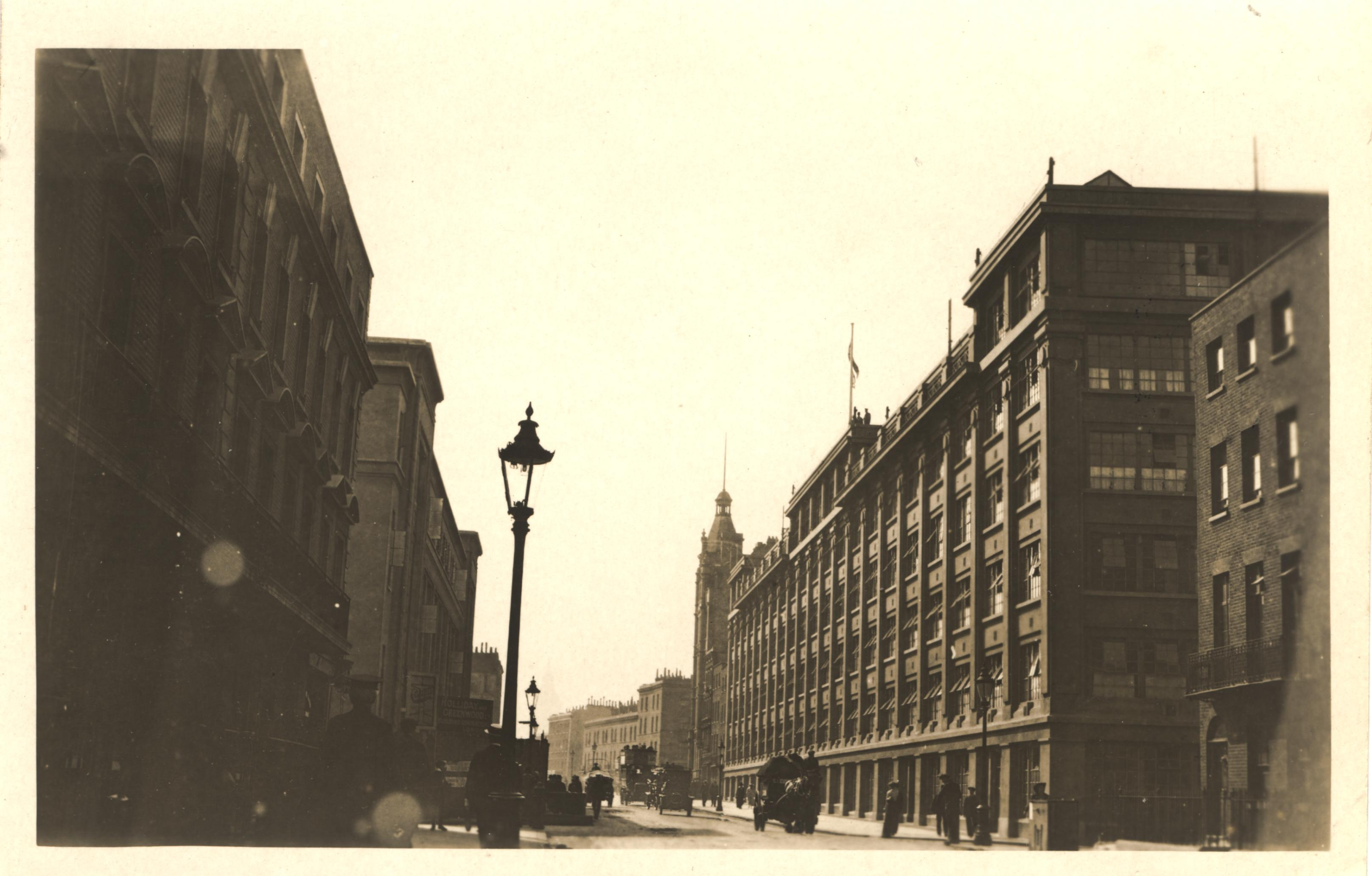
Stamford Street in 1915.

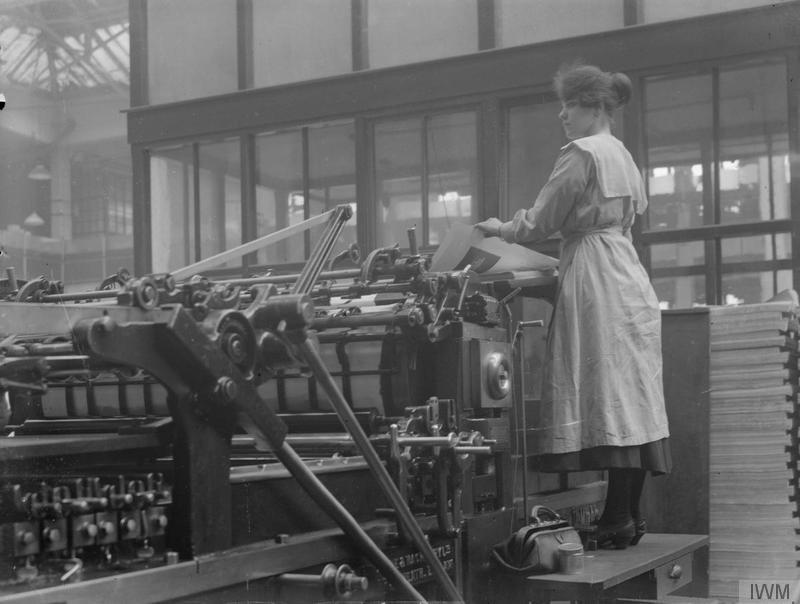
A female worker operating a laying machine in the printing works of WH Smith & Sons, Stamford Street, in 1918.

The eastern end from Blackfriars Road to No. 40 (i.e. as far as the bend opposite Dorset House) was built c1790, with open gardens or fields to the west. The continuation westward to Broadwall was added c1803, and known as Upper Stamford Street. The extension from Broadwall to Waterloo Road was made in 1815 as part of the approach to Waterloo Bridge. In 1868 Upper Stamford Street was incorporated with Stamford Street and re-numbered.

At this time the Bankside area was a centre for hat-making. There were 7 hat-makers in Stamford Street in 1882. These are now commemorated only by the street Hatfields and the Mad Hatter Hotel.

Most of the original houses of Stamford Street were demolished in the early 1900s and replaced with industrial buildings. During World War II the area suffered bomb damage, but Stamford Street was by-passed by post-war development of the South Bank.

In 1977 a developer announced plans to build offices and Europe's tallest hotel on eight largely derelict sites around Coin Street. The Coin Street Action Group was set up to develop community-led alternative plans. The Greater London Council owned half of the land and blocked the development, selling the site to Coin Street Community Builders in 1984, with the aim of making the area a better place to live, work and visit by creating a mix of uses. Between 1984 and 1988 derelict buildings were demolished, housing co-operatives were built, and a new park was created between Stamford Street and the riverside.

== Buildings ==
=== South Side ===
Starts at: Blackfriars Road

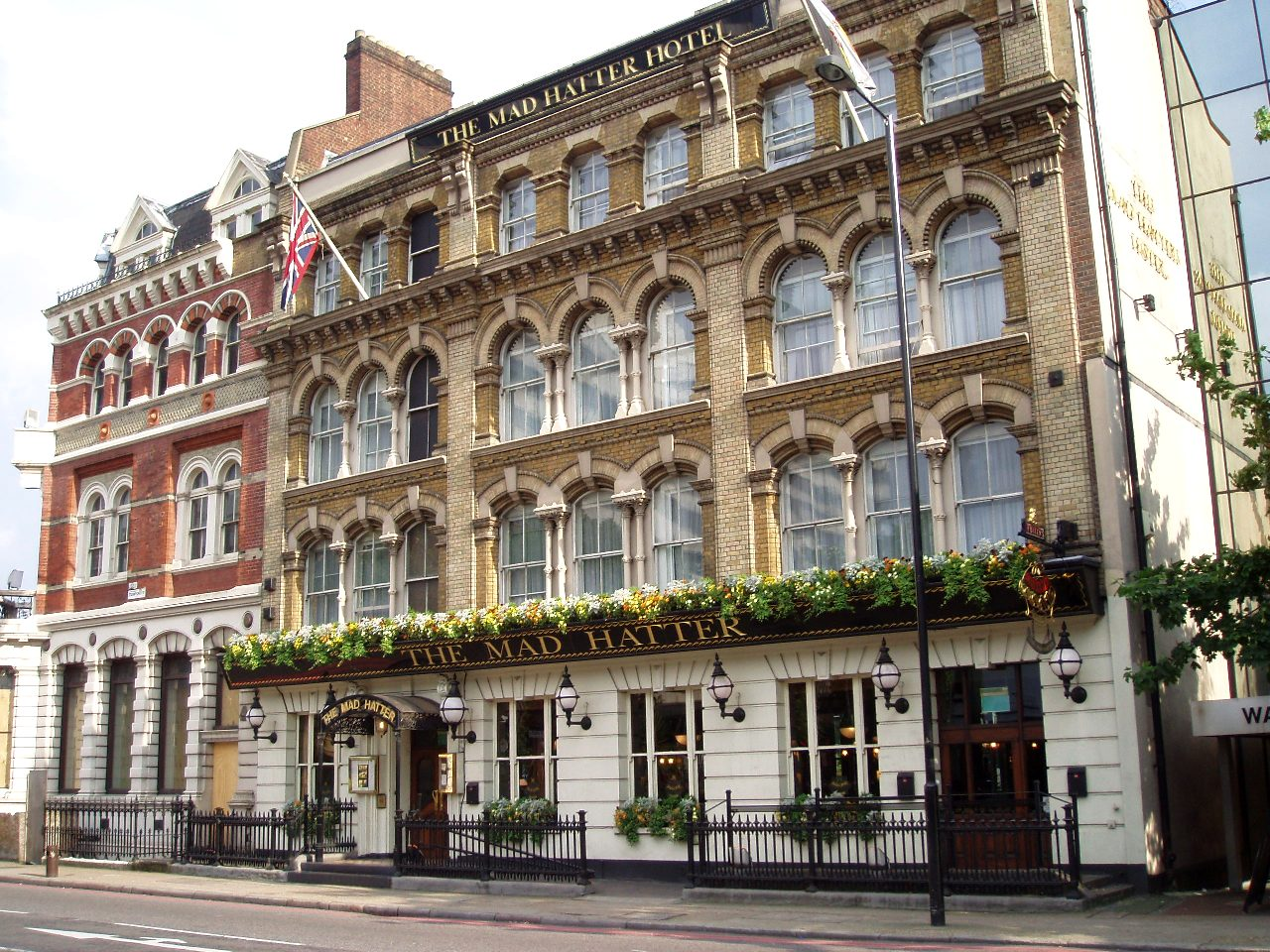
The Mad Hatter Hotel, 3-7 Stamford Street, in 2008.

1 Stamford Street - a Grade II listed 4-storey commercial building, built c1870 in red brick with stone dressings. It was previously a bank, and is now awaiting refurbishment as part of the development at 18 Blackfriars Road.

The Mad Hatter Hotel, 3-7 Stamford Street - a Grade II listed 4-storey hotel and public house, built c1875 in stock brick with stone dressings and roof hidden behind a parapet. The site was formerly occupied by the hat maker Tress & Co.

Construction site, a proposed 40-storey residential tower above a 3-storey retail podium, part of the development at 18 Blackfriars Road, designed by Foster + Partners, which also incorporates a 45-storey office tower on Blackfriars Road, and a 22-storey affordable residential tower on Paris Gardens.

Side street: Paris Gardens.

Dorset House, 27-45 Stamford Street - an 8-storey office building of rusticated stone, which curves to follow the road. It was built during 1931-33 for Iliffe & Sons, who printed periodical magazines. It was later occupied by IPC magazines and HM Revenue & Customs. It is currently empty awaiting refurbishment.

Crossing street: Hatfields

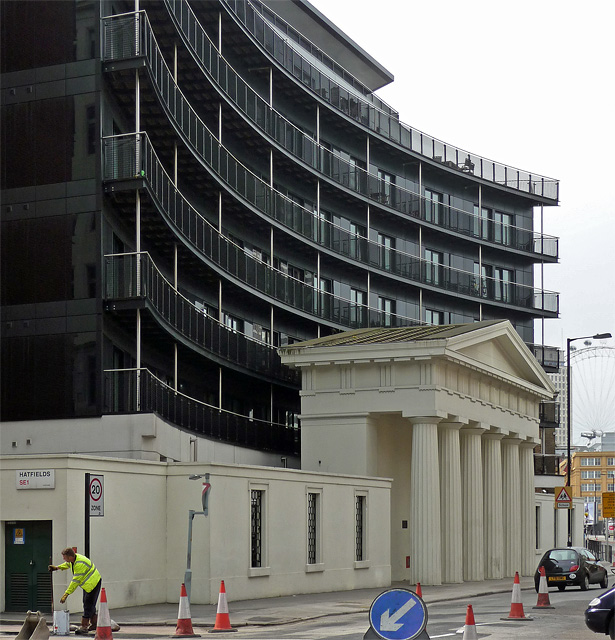
Former portico in front of 57 Stamford Street in 2011.

57 Stamford Street - an 8-storey apartment building built c2005. The entrance consists of the Grade II listed portico of a Unitarian Chapel, built in 1821. The chapel fell into disuse and the main body was demolished in 1964.

London Nautical School, 61 Stamford Street - a Grade II listed 3-storey school building built in 1820 in yellow stock brick with stone dressings. It was designed by James Mountague for the Benevolent Society of Saint Patrick, an educational charity for poor Irish children in London. The schoolrooms were planned as wings each side of a centre block containing committee rooms and living quarters for the master and mistress. An additional storey was built over each wing in 1909. In 1921 the property was bought by the London County Council for use as the Central Printing School. Since 1965 it has been occupied by the London Nautical School, a specialist sports and naval college.

Crossing street: Duchy Street

63 Stamford Street - a Grade II listed 4-storey house, built in the early 19th century in stock brick with stone coped parapet. The ground floor shop was added in the mid-19th century, and is currently occupied by Konditor. The two posts outside are cast gun barrels, also Grade II listed.

65-87 Stamford Street - a Grade II listed 4-storey Regency terrace, built in 1829 in stock brick with stone dressings. There are two 8-bay wings and a higher 10-bay central section.

89 Stamford Street - a Grade II listed 3-storey house built in the early 19th century of stock brick with parapet.

91 Stamford Street - a Grade II listed 4-storey house built in the early 19th century of stock brick with parapet. A ground floor shop was added in the mid-19th century, and is currently occupied by the Sticky Mango restaurant.

Crossing street: Coin Street

32-34 Coin Street - a 4-storey building containing 7 flats, built in 1997 in yellow stock brick with stone details and concrete moulding on the ground floor. It was intended to harmonise with the adjacent terrace, but is crudely detailed in comparison to the originals.

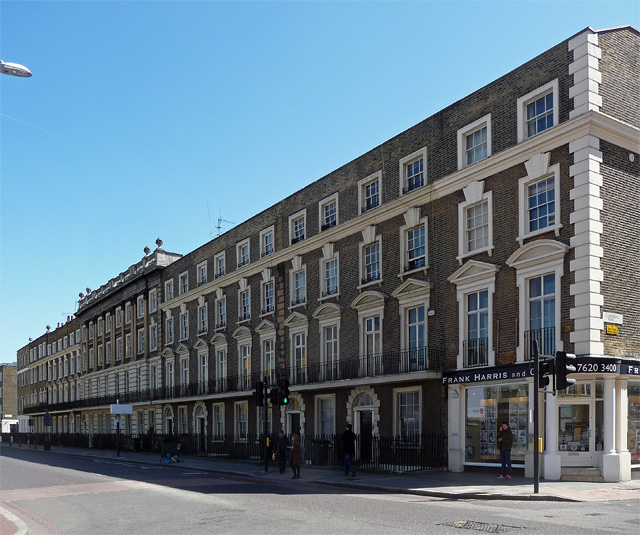
95-123 Stamford Street in 2013.

95-123 Stamford Street - a Grade II listed Regency terrace of 4-storey town houses, built in 1829. It is built in stock brick with stone dressings including quoins at the corners. There are five sections of 4, 6, 8, 6 and 4 bays. No 123 was converted into a shop in the mid-19th century.

Crossing street: Cornwall Road

Stamford Street Apartments, 127 Stamford Street - a student hall of residence. It was built during 1914-16 as a printing works for W H Smith & Son. The design by Stanley Peach incorporates monolithic Egyptian style features to its façade and railings. It was sold to the proprietors of the Daily Telegraph in 1939, but was not occupied by them owing to the outbreak of war. It was badly damaged by bombing and subsequently used for storage.

BPP University College, 137 Stamford Street - a 7-storey university building, with Portland stone façade on the lower floors. The lower 3 storeys were built in 1930 as a headquarters for the London Electricity Supply Co, and named Lesco House. It was extended to five floors in 1965 and vacated in 1983. It has been used by BPP College as a law school since 2004.

James Clerk Maxwell Building, 57 Waterloo Road - a 9-storey, brick-built teaching facility for King's College London Waterloo Campus. It was formerly offices named Waterloo Bridge House and a post office.

Ends at: Waterloo Road

=== North Side ===
Starts at: Blackfriars Road

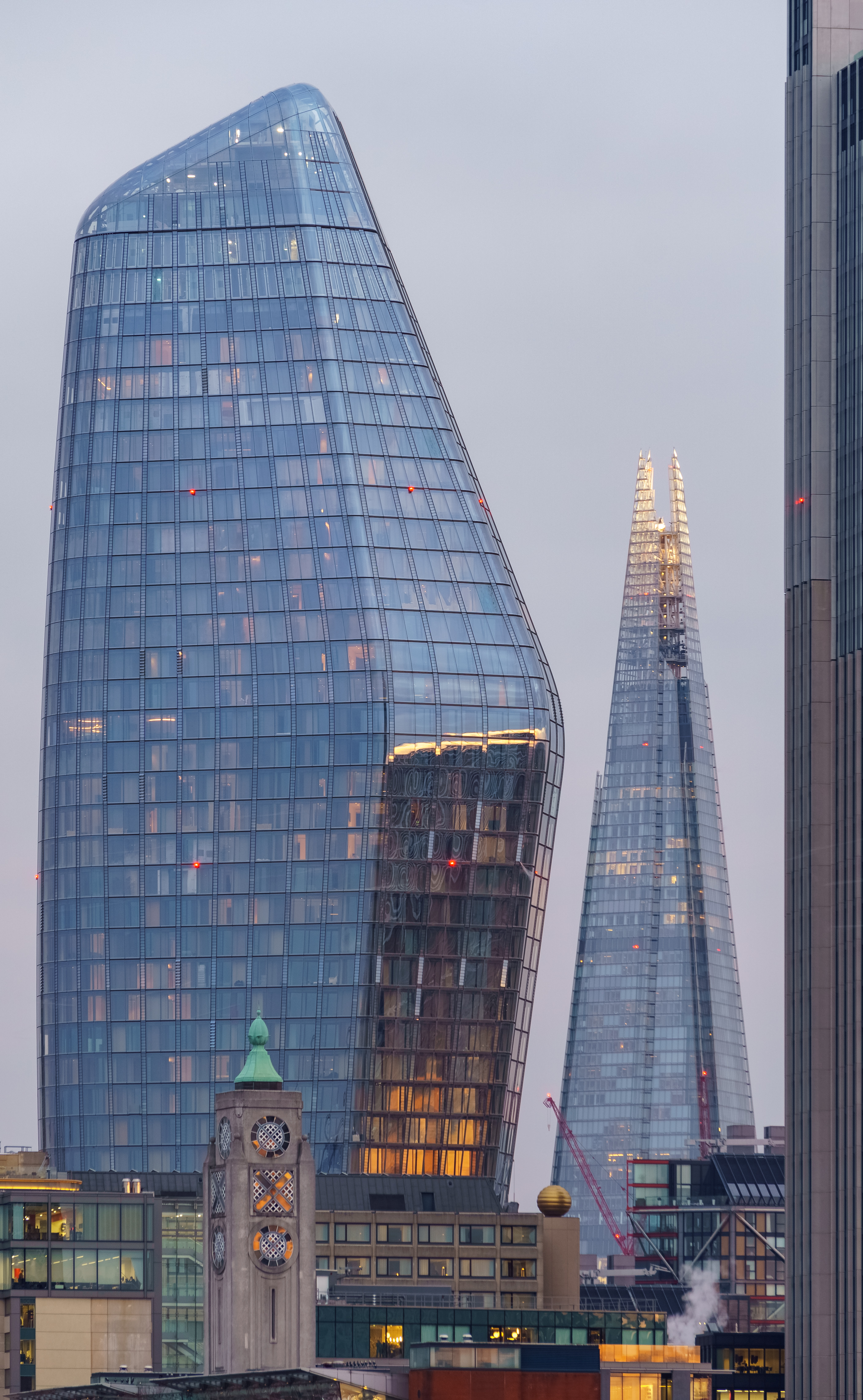
One Blackfriars, The Shard and the South Bank Tower from Waterloo Bridge in 2019.

One Blackfriars - a 52-storey residential tower designed by SimpsonHaugh and built during 2013–19. It has a curved glass façade in graduated colours and is known as "The Vase". The site includes a 4-storey podium building at the corner of Stamford Street and Blackfriars Road. The site was formerly occupied by the headquarters of Sainsbury's supermarket, demolished in 2003.

Bankside Hotel, a 6-storey glass-walled hotel along Rennie Street, part of the One Blackfriars development, completed in 2018.

Side street: Rennie Street

Vivo Building, 30 Stamford Street - a 9-storey office building with a concave frontage that follows the curve of Stamford Street. It was designed by Richard Seifert and Partners as a 5-storey office podium building for the King's Reach Tower with a concrete frame structure and smoked glass and was built during 1973–78. It was extended and raised as part of the redevelopment of the tower into the residential South Bank Tower during 2013–16. Ground floor retail units include Little Waitrose.

Crossing street: Hatfields

Hatfield House, 52-54 Stamford Street - a 4-storey office building with brick frontage and stone facing on the ground floor entrance. The ground floor bar was previously the Slug & Lettuce and Dr Inks, and has been The Fountain & Ink since 2016.

56 Stamford Street - a 6-storey block of apartments with offices on the ground floor.

58-60 Stamford Street - a 6-storey office building with high brick arches and glazed infills, reflecting the Unitarian chapel portico opposite. It was previously an engineering works.

Thirsty Bear Pub, 62 Stamford Street - a 3-storey brick-built pub. It opened in 1839 as the Stamford Arms. It was renamed The Thirsty Bear in 2012.

Side street: Broadwall

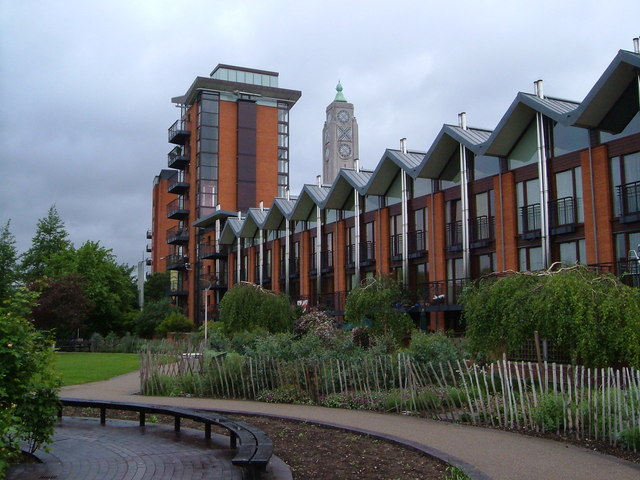
Bernie Spain Gardens with the Palm Housing Co-operative and the Oxo Tower behind in 2006.

Palm Housing Co-operative - a terrace of 3-storey houses and a 9-storey tower, completed in 1994. It is built in warm red brick with varnished oak cladding, zinc and copper roofs with large French doors overlooking the gardens.

Bernie Spain Gardens - named after Bernadette Spain, one of the original Coin Street Action Group campaigners. The gardens were completed in 1988. They occupy the site of the former Eldorado Ice Cream factory (64-76 Stamford Street).

Crossing street: Duchy Street

Mulberry Housing Co-operative, 88 Stamford Street - a quadrangle development of 4-storey homes faced with render and brick. It was the first of the Coin Street housing co-operatives, completed in 1988.

Crossing street: Coin Street

Coin Street Neighbourhood Centre, 108 Stamford Street - a 5-storey community centre and mixed-use building, including the headquarters of social enterprise, Coin Street Community Builders. It was designed by Haworth Tompkins and opened in 2007. The ground floor is occupied by Nando's restaurant.

Car park – land intended for development by Coin Street Community Builders. The site was occupied by a Boots commercial building until it was demolished in 1985.

Crossing street: Cornwall Road

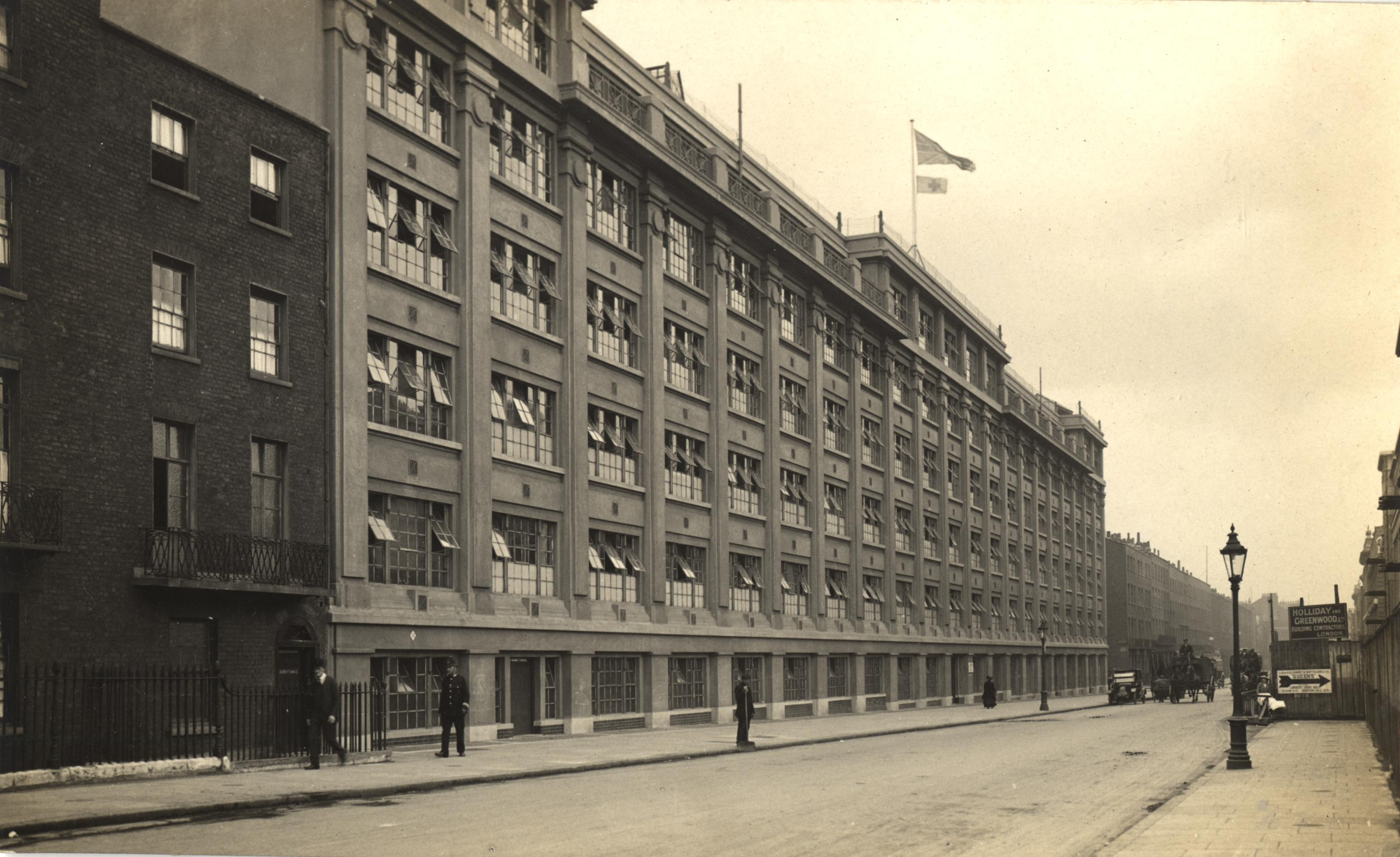
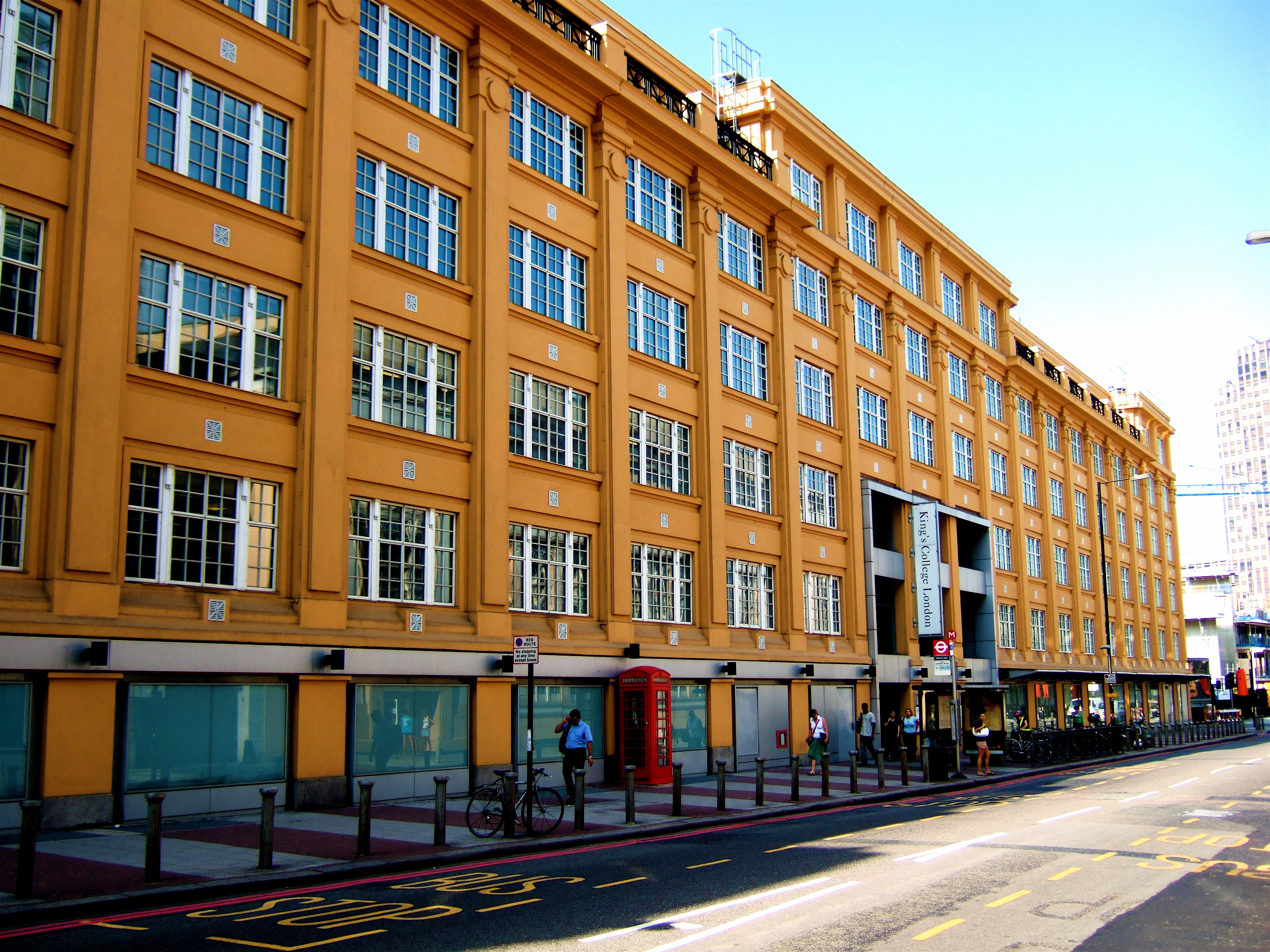
King George Military Hospital in 1915 (left) now the Franklin-Wilkins Building, Waterloo Campus, King's College London, photographed in 2006 (right)

Franklin Wilkins Building, 150 Stamford Street - a 6-storey reinforced concrete building, forming part of the Waterloo Campus of King's College London. It was built between 1912 and 1915 for Her Majesty's Stationery Office, known as Cornwall House, with tunnels connecting it to nearby Waterloo Station. Before HMSO could move in the building was requisitioned in 1915 for use as a military hospital, and the tunnels were used to transfer wounded soldiers arriving by train. From 1920 it was used as government offices. King's College acquired the building in the late 1980s and after refurbishment it opened as an educational site in 1999. Outside are two Grade II listed telephone kiosks. The kiosk on the left is a cast-iron K2 design from 1927. The kiosk on the right is a cast-iron K6 design from 1935.

Conway Hall, 51-55 Waterloo Road - a Grade II-listed 5-storey building of red brick with terracotta dressing, and open arcading on 3 upper floors. It is used as student accommodation for the University of Notre Dame. The site was occupied by the Royal Universal Infirmary for Children in 1824. It was rebuilt in 1903 as the Royal Waterloo Hospital for Children and Women. It joined the NHS in 1948 as part of St Thomas' Hospital, and closed in 1976. In 1981 the building became the central London campus of Schiller International University. In 2011 it was renovated and converted into student accommodation.

Ends at: Waterloo Road
