= Blackfriars Road =

Road in Southwark, London

Coordinates: 51°30′20″N 0°06′16″W

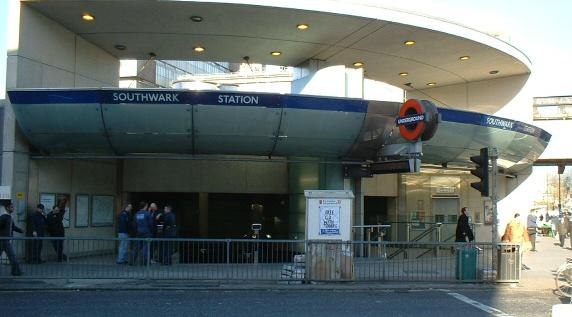
Southwark tube station on the corner of Blackfriars Road and The Cut.

Blackfriars Road is a road in Southwark, SE1. It runs between St George's Circus at the southern end and Blackfriars Bridge over the River Thames at the northern end, leading to the City of London. Halfway up on the west side is Southwark Underground station, on the corner with The Cut. Opposite is Palestra, a large office building which houses the Surface transport division of Transport for London, which was formerly the headquarters of the London Development Agency.

The road forms part of the A201. The road adjoins Stamford Street and Southwark Street at the northern end. Originally known as Surrey Street, the road was built in the 1760s as the south approach to Blackfriars Bridge, and was laid out by the bridge surveyor, Robert Mylne.

From 2010 a number of major development schemes have transformed Blackfriars Road from the bridge to the south at St George's Circus and new buildings have replaced the post World War II offices with residential and hotel accommodation along its length, especially at the junction with Stamford Street where major high rises have been erected, such as the 166.3 m (546 ft) tall One Blackfriars.

In April 2024, Southwark Liberal Democrat councillor Victor Chamberlain proposed a rainbow plaque be unveiled on Blackfriars Road to commemorate James Pratt and John Smith, who in 1835 were arrested nearby and became the last men executed for sodomy in England.

== See also ==
- Blackfriars Road railway station (1864–1868)
- Blackfriars station
- A201 road
- Surrey Chapel, Southwark
