= Waterloo East railway station =

Railway station in central London

Waterloo East
- London Waterloo East
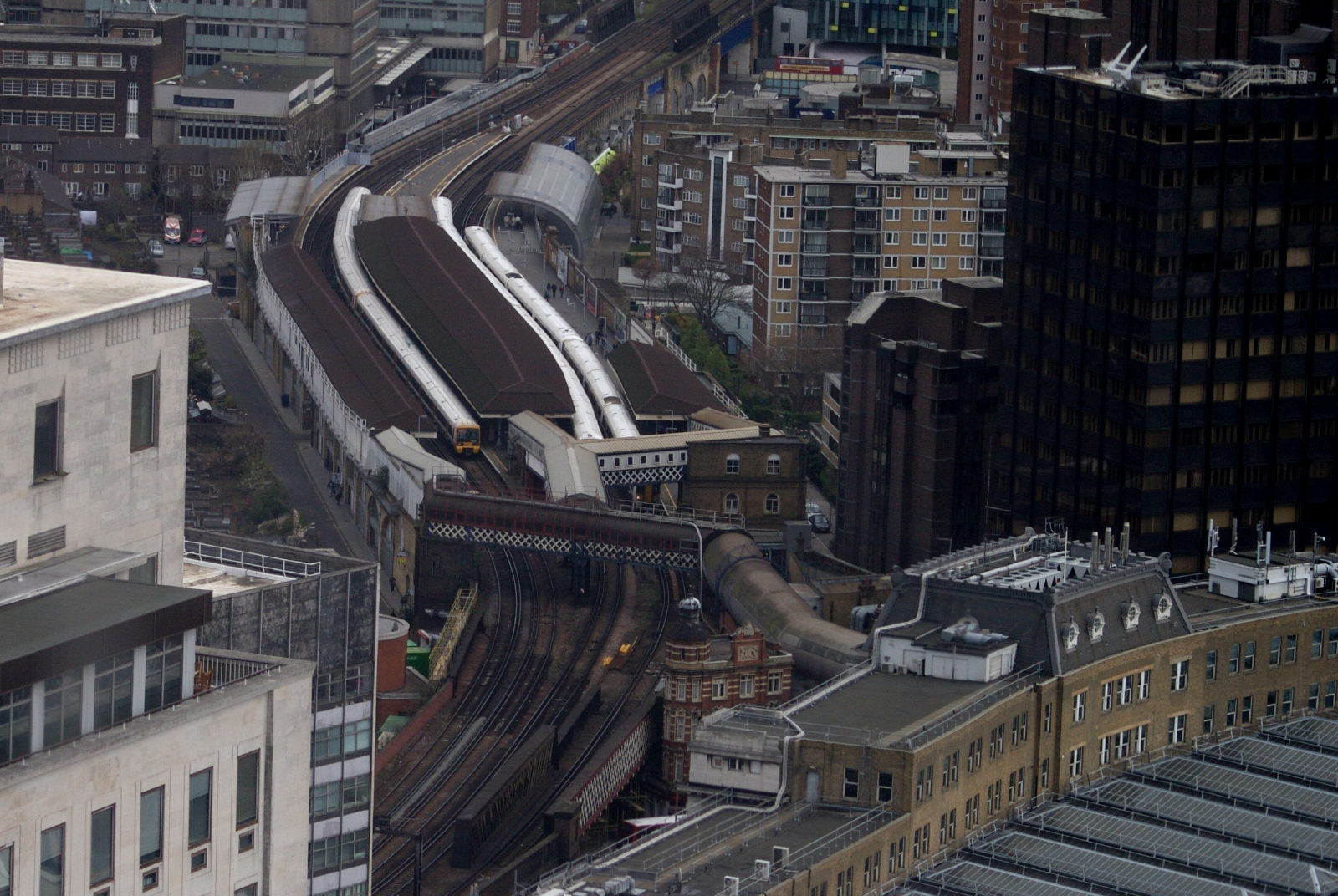
- Waterloo East viewed from the London Eye
- Interactive map of Waterloo East

General information
- Location: Waterloo
- Local authority: London Borough of Lambeth
- Grid reference: TQ313800
- Managed by: Southeastern
- Owner: Network Rail
- Station code: WAE
- DfT category: B
- Number of platforms: 4 (lettered A–D)
- Fare zone: 1
- OSI: Waterloo; Waterloo; Embankment; Southwark

National Rail annual entry and exit
- 2020–21: ▼2.194 million
- Interchange: ▼0.255 million
- 2021–22: ▲5.109 million
- Interchange: ▲0.557 million
- 2022–23: ▲5.430 million
- Interchange: ▲0.641 million
- 2023–24: ▲5.676 million
- Interchange: ▲0.692 million
- 2024–25: ▲6.841 million
- Interchange: ▲0.803 million

Railway companies
- Original company: South Eastern Railway
- Pre-grouping: South Eastern and Chatham Railway
- Post-grouping: Southern Railway

Key dates
- 1 January 1869: Opened as Waterloo Junction
- 7 July 1935: Renamed Waterloo
- 2 May 1977: Renamed Waterloo East

Other information
- External links: Departures; Facilities
- Coordinates: 51.5037°N 0.111°W

Waterloo East railway station, also known as London Waterloo East, is a railway station in central London on the line from Charing Cross through to London Bridge towards Kent, in the south-east of England. It is to the east of London Waterloo railway station and close to Southwark tube station.

The station opened in 1869 as Waterloo Junction, to provide a connection between the London and South Western Railway at Waterloo, and the South Eastern Railway at Charing Cross. A dedicated line was built between Waterloo and Waterloo East, which was later converted to a footpath. Trains originally ran to Cannon Street, but after competition from the London Underground, these were withdrawn as a wartime measure in 1916. The station continued to be connected to Waterloo mainline via a footbridge. Waterloo East was given its current name in 1977, and remains an important interchange in London. It is part of the London station group. The station is located in London fare zone 1.

== Location ==
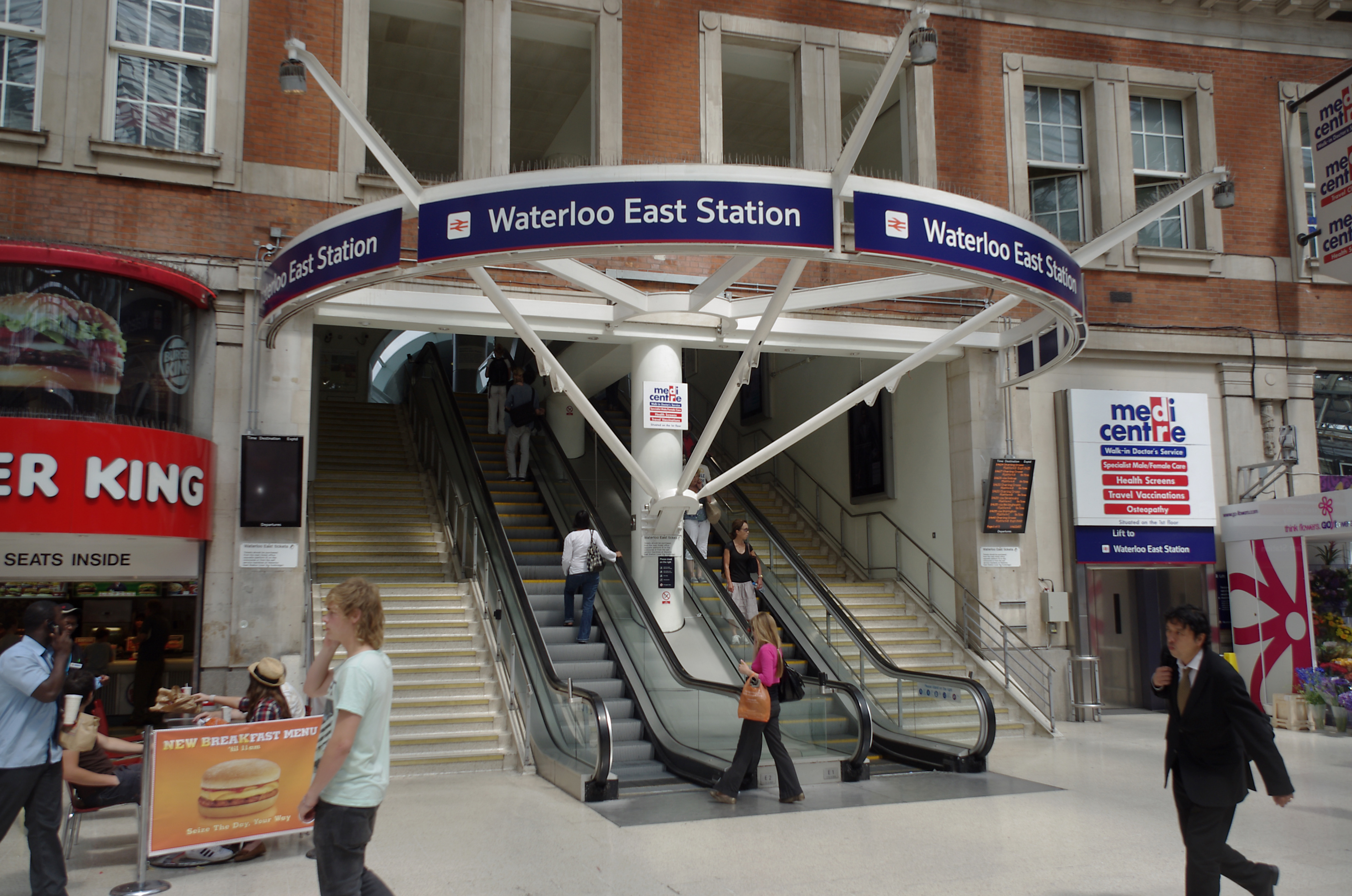
Entrance to Waterloo East from Waterloo station prior to the completion of the retail balcony in 2012.

The station is on the South Eastern Main Line 61 chains (1.2 km) down the line from Charing Cross, on the other side of the River Thames across from Hungerford Bridge. Although Waterloo East is a through-station, it is classed for ticketing purposes as a central London terminus.

Services through the station are operated by Southeastern and it is situated within London fare zone 1. The main access is via an elevated walkway across Waterloo Road, which connects it to the larger Waterloo station. The eastern ends of the platforms provide pedestrian connection to Southwark station which is served by London Underground's Jubilee line; at street level there is an entrance in Sandell Street. Connections with the Underground's Bakerloo, Northern and Waterloo & City lines are available at Waterloo Underground station.

The four platforms at Waterloo East are lettered rather than numbered to ensure that staff and passengers do not confuse the platforms at the two stations. (Note: The Thameslink platforms at St Pancras International and the platforms at New Cross use this numbering convention, as did the platforms at the predecessor Thameslink station to St Pancras, King's Cross Thameslink.)

The station is served by London Buses daytime, peak hours express, and nighttime routes.

== History ==
=== South Eastern Railway ===
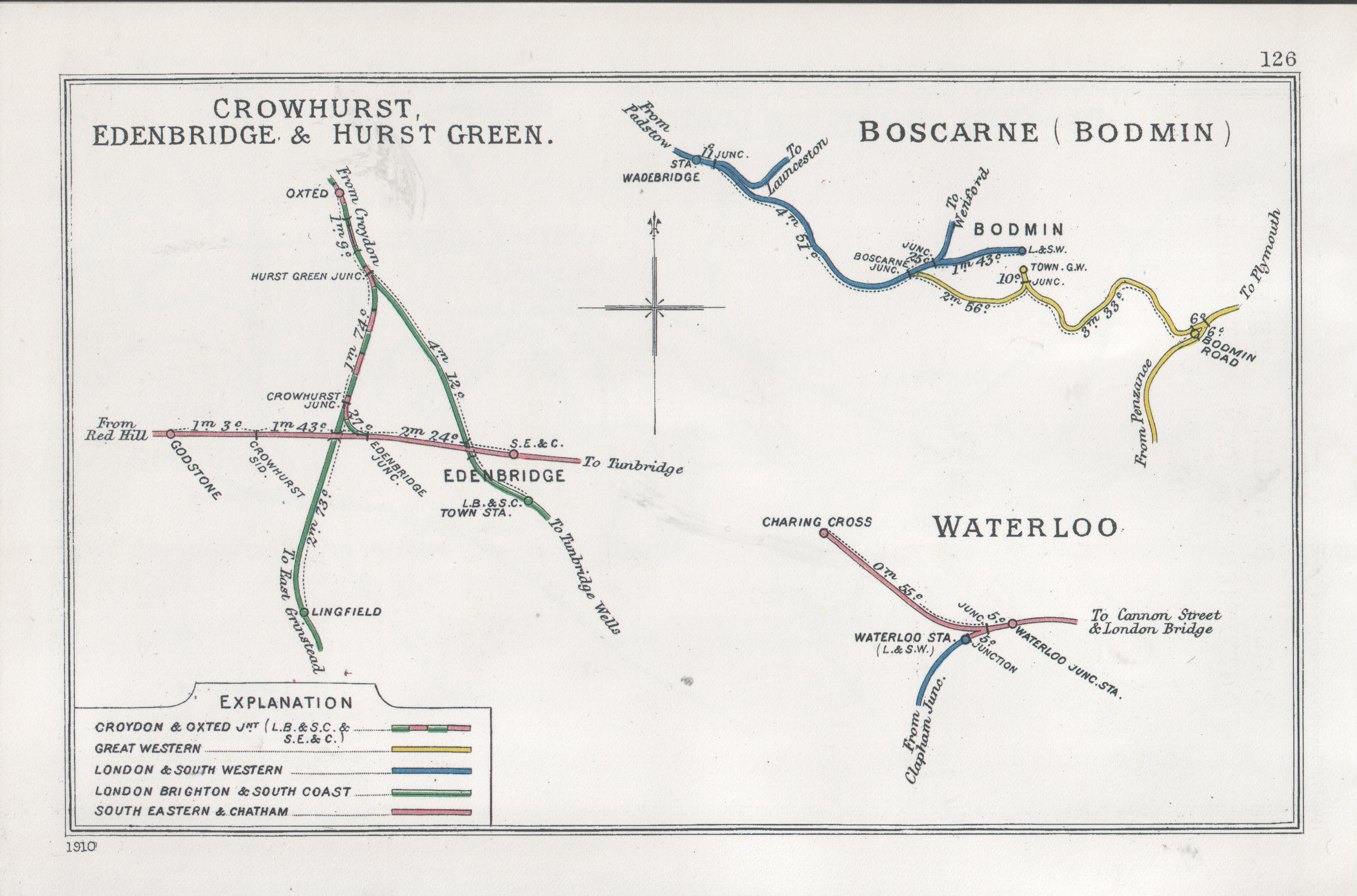
A 1910 Railway Clearing House map of lines around Waterloo – note the connecting line between Waterloo and Waterloo East.

The station was built by the South Eastern Railway (SER) after the line to Charing Cross opened in 1864. The company were under pressure to connect with London and South Western Railway (LSWR) services, as it would allow the latter to connect to the City of London via Cannon Street. The LSWR were not interested in making Charing Cross a joint station, but were amenable to providing a connection with the SER next to Waterloo.

In 1867, the two companies agreed to build a joint connection so that passengers could change from LSWR to SER services in order to reach the City of London via Cannon Street. Another station, Blackfriars was built to the east, but it was closed in favour of a connecting station with the LSWR. Construction of a single-line, 5-chain (100 m) connection begun in May 1868, and the new connection station opened on 1 January 1869 at a total cost of £14,290 (£1,471,000 as of 2025). Blackfriars station closed on the same date. Trains began running from Waterloo Junction to Charing Cross and Cannon Street around every five minutes. Queen Victoria used the connection for royal trains travelling from Windsor Castle to Dover and Continental Europe.

The original station was built with two platforms, which were 530 feet (160 m) and 440 feet (130 m) long, and both 18 feet (5.5 m) wide. The waiting room and ticket offices were housed in arches underneath the line. The bridge connection from the main Waterloo station included a movable platform, which allowed passengers to cross directly into Waterloo East when trains were not running. It was mounted on a four-wheel truck which could easily be moved out of the way if a train needed to come through. The connection ran until January 1893, when it was discontinued because of overcrowding.

When the SER line opened between Charing Cross and Cannon Street in 1864, it was frequented by prostitutes, who discovered the journey between the two stations was sufficiently long to service clients while paying minimum rent. After Waterloo East opened, the frequent stopping of trains there made this impractical.

The connection from Waterloo Junction through to Cannon Street did not prove a success because of competition from the Metropolitan District Railway (now the District line) and the spread of the Underground. Passengers were generally unaware of the existence of the station, as it was not obvious to find it from the main concourse in Waterloo. Following the opening of the Waterloo and City line on 8 August 1898, connections to Cannon Street were reduced. Cross train services from Waterloo Junction to Cannon Street ended on 31 December 1916, as a wartime economy measure.

The dedicated line from Waterloo through to Waterloo Junction was demolished in 1911 when the main-line station underwent an extensive reconstruction. The bridge which carried the line over Waterloo Road subsequently accommodated the pedestrian walkway between the two stations.

=== Southern Railway and later ===
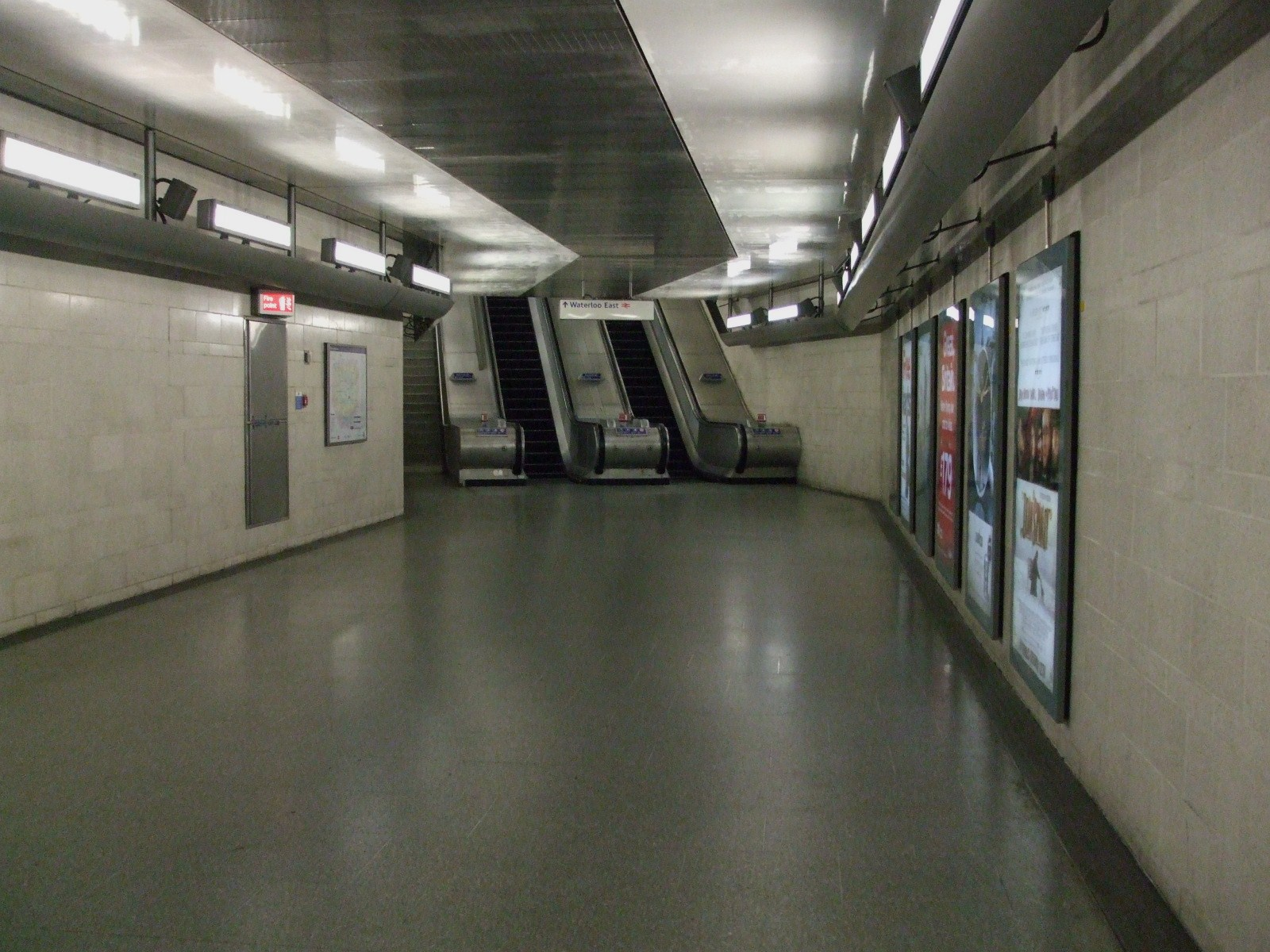
Escalators leading to Waterloo East station from Southwark tube station.

The Southern Railway renamed the station Waterloo (also known as Waterloo Eastern) on 7 July 1935 and it took its present name on 2 May 1977. The platforms were designated A – D at the same time.

The pedestrian access from Waterloo mainline was replaced by the current high level covered walkway in 1992. The site of the original rail link, which had been out of use since 1916 was then demolished.

Waterloo East was closed for maintenance on 24 July 1993 so a link with Southwark tube station, then under construction, could be built. It re-opened on 16 August. Southwark tube station opened on 20 November 1999 with the extension of the Jubilee line to Stratford, and included a direct connection to Waterloo East.

In 2012, ticket barriers were installed at the Sandell Street and Southwark station entrances, and also at the main entrance from Waterloo station following the completion of the retail balcony. In 2018, Transport for London announced a new entrance would be built on Greet Street, providing access to both Waterloo East and Southwark.

== Services ==
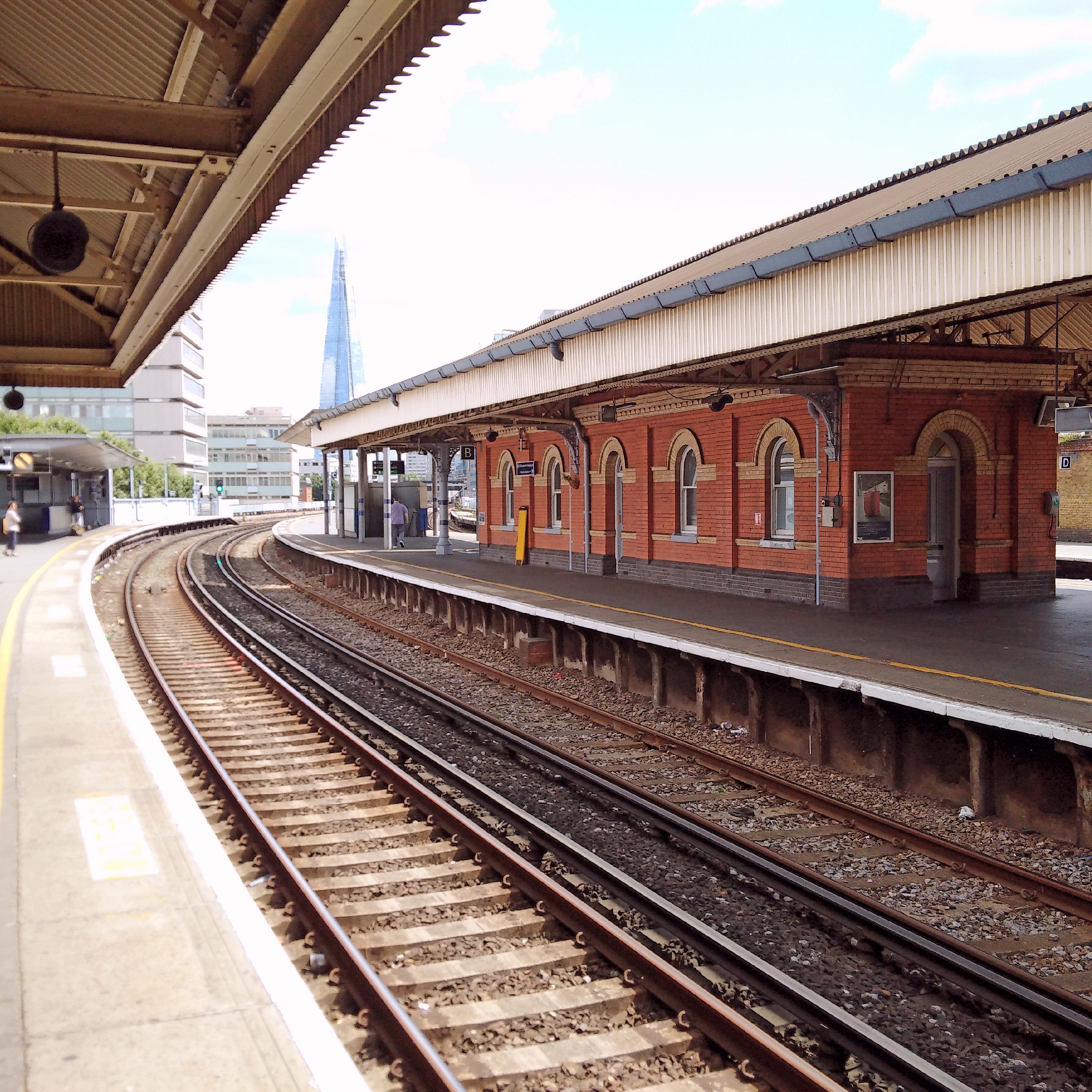
Platform A view towards the Shard

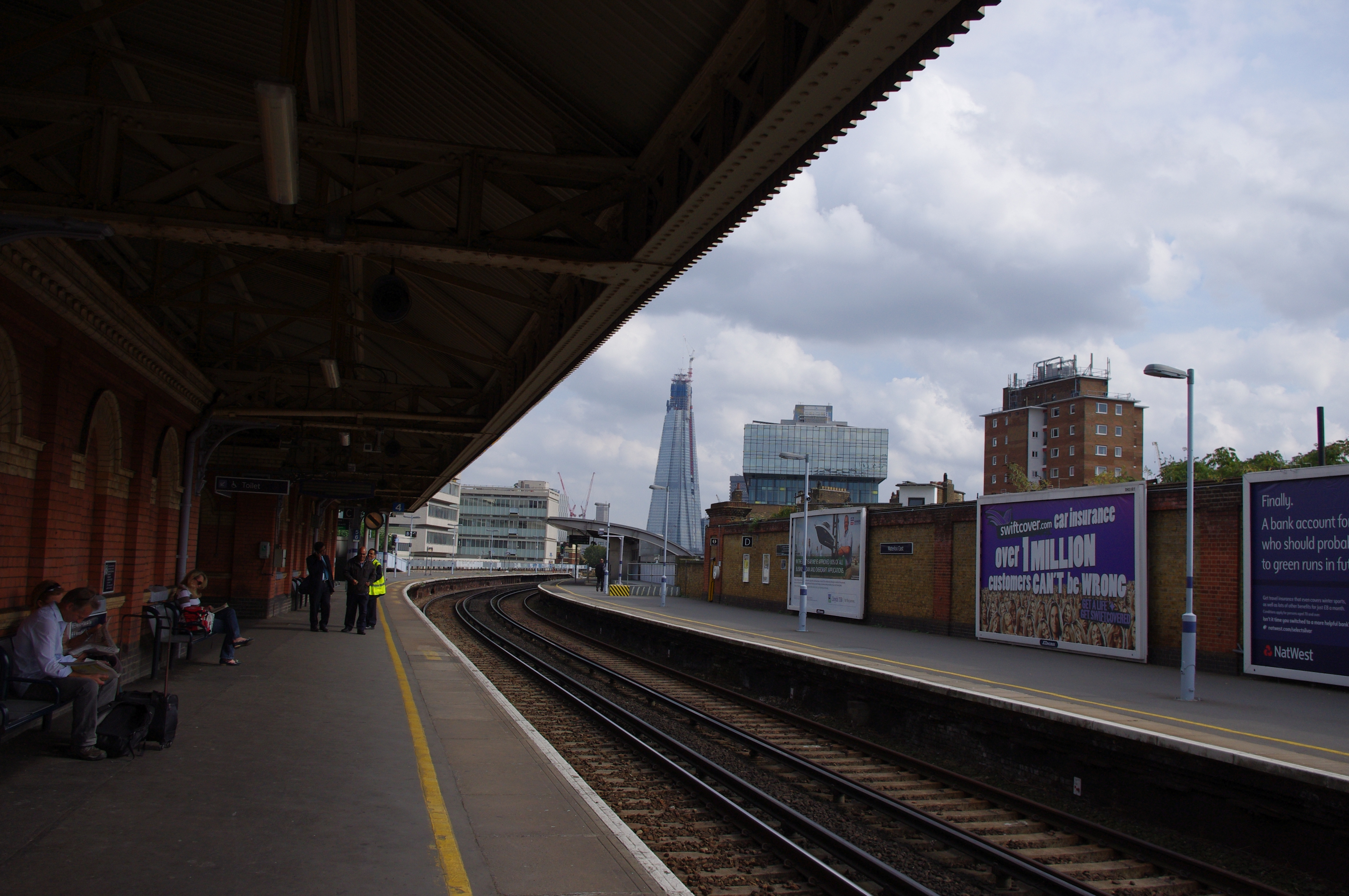
Platform C and Platform D

All "up" trains run to Charing Cross only, and depart from platforms B and D. All "down" trains run from platforms A and C.

All services at Waterloo East are operated by Southeastern.

The typical off-peak service in trains per hour (tph) is:

- 16 tph to London Charing Cross
- 4 tph to Dartford via Sidcup of which 2 continue to Gravesend
- 1 tph to Dartford via Bexleyheath
- 4 tph to Hayes via Catford Bridge
- 2 tph to Sevenoaks via Grove Park
- 1 tph to Dover Priory
- 1 tph to Ramsgate via Canterbury West
- 2 tph to Hastings via Tunbridge Wells (1 semi-fast, 1 stopping)
- 1 tph to Maidstone East via Swanley

Preceding station	National Rail	Following station
London Charing Cross	Southeastern South Eastern Main Line	London Bridge
	Historical railways	
Terminus	South Eastern Railway South Eastern Main Line	Blackfriars

== Incidents ==
On 25 October 1913, a passenger train coming into Waterloo Junction from Blackheath collided with a stationary train in heavy fog. Three people were killed and 24 injured. An inquest was held, where it was determined that the accident was caused by negligence of a signalman, though not to the level of criminal negligence.
