= Blackfriars (SER) railway station =

Station between Charing Cross and London Bridge

Blackfriars (SER)
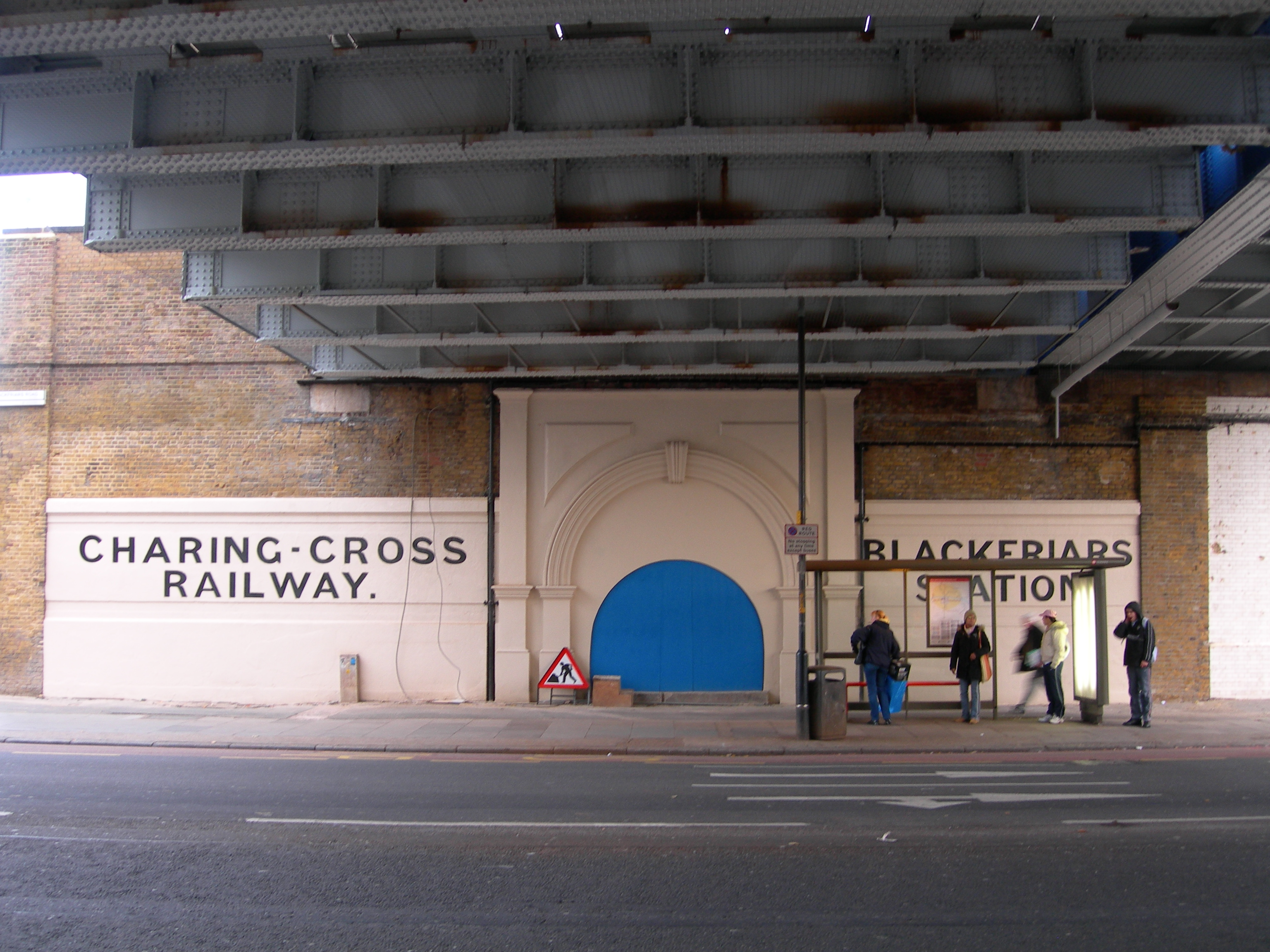
- Blackfriars Road railway station entrance
- Interactive map of Blackfriars (SER)

General information
- Location: Southwark Christchurch
- Local authority: London Borough of Southwark
- Owner: South Eastern Railway

Key dates
- 11 January 1864: Opened
- 1 January 1869: Closed
- Replaced by: Waterloo Junction

Other information
- Coordinates: 51°30′15″N 0°06′15″W

Blackfriars was a short-lived railway station on the South Eastern Railway (SER) line, in the parish of Southwark Christchurch, between Charing Cross and London Bridge. It was opened in 1864 with the name Blackfriars but closed less than five years later when it was replaced by the station now called Waterloo East (originally named Waterloo).

In 1886 the London, Chatham and Dover Railway (LCDR) opened a station on the north bank of the river called St. Paul's – this was renamed Blackfriars in 1937.

The former entrance to the South Eastern Railway Blackfriars station under the railway bridge on Blackfriars Road itself is still clearly visible. In 2005 the bricked-up former street-level entrance and original wording were restored. At track level, widening of the viaduct on its north side is the only indication of its site. In July 2009 planning permission was granted for a café to be built over the entranceway to the station.

== See also ==
- Blackfriars Bridge railway station, an LCDR station opened in June 1864, south of the Thames but north of Blackfriars (SER).

Preceding station	Historical railways	Following station
London Charing Cross	South Eastern Railway; South Eastern Main Line	London Bridge
