= Charing Cross railway station =

Central London railway terminus

Charing Cross
- London Charing Cross
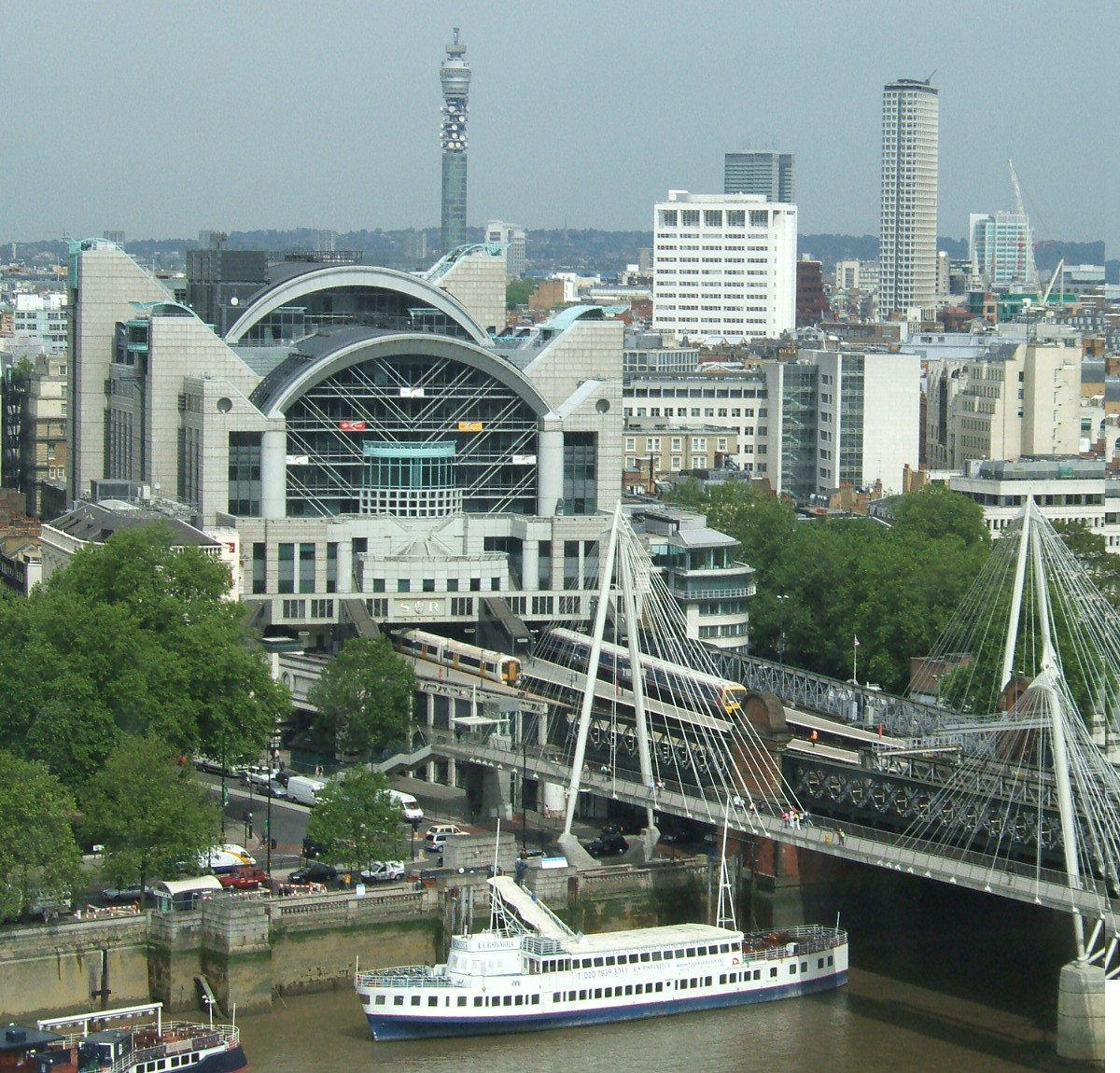
- Approach tracks across the River Thames
- Interactive map of Charing Cross

General information
- Location: Charing Cross
- Local authority: City of Westminster
- Managed by: Network Rail
- Station code: CHX
- DfT category: A
- Number of platforms: 6
- Accessible: Yes
- Fare zone: 1
- OSI: Charing Cross; Embankment
- Cycle parking: No
- Toilet facilities: Yes

National Rail annual entry and exit
- 2020–21: ▼5.373 million
- Interchange: ▼91,995
- 2021–22: ▲15.733 million
- Interchange: ▲0.295 million
- 2022–23: ▲16.191 million
- Interchange: ▲0.419 million
- 2023–24: ▲17.701 million
- Interchange: ▲0.488 million
- 2024–25: ▲19.768 million
- Interchange: ▼0.316 million

Railway companies
- Original company: South Eastern Railway
- Pre-grouping: South Eastern & Chatham Railway
- Post-grouping: Southern Railway

Key dates
- 11 January 1864: Opened

Other information
- External links: Departures; Facilities
- Coordinates: 51.508°N 0.125°W

Charing Cross railway station (also known as London Charing Cross) is a central London railway terminus between the Strand and Hungerford Bridge in the City of Westminster. It is the terminus of the Southeastern Main Lines to Dover via Ashford and Hastings via Tunbridge Wells. All trains are operated by Southeastern, which provides the majority of commuter and regional services to south-east London and Kent. It is connected to Charing Cross Underground station and is near to Embankment Underground station and Embankment Pier.

The station was originally opened by the South Eastern Railway in 1864. It takes its name from its proximity to the road junction Charing Cross, the notional "centre of London" from which distances from the city are measured. During the 19th century the station became the main London terminus for continental traffic via boat trains, and served several prestigious international services. It was badly damaged by a roof collapse in 1905 and extensively rebuilt, subsequently becoming an important meeting point for military and government traffic during World War I. By this time, Charing Cross station was seen as out of date by some politicians and proposals were made to replace Hungerford Bridge with a road bridge or road/rail combination, with the station moving to the south bank of the River Thames in the case of a road-only replacement. The station was bombed several times during World War II, and was rebuilt afterwards, re-opening in 1951. In the late 1980s, the station complex was redesigned by Terry Farrell and rebuilt to accommodate a modern office block, now known as Embankment Place.

== Location ==
Charing Cross station is located at the western end of the Strand in the City of Westminster, east of Trafalgar Square and northeast of Whitehall. It is close to the Embankment Pier, providing river services along the River Thames. The railway leads directly out onto Hungerford Bridge and across the river towards the London Borough of Lambeth.

The station code is CHX. It is one of twenty stations in Great Britain that are managed by Network Rail and is the 15th busiest station in the country. A number of key bus routes run in the area, and are designated "Trafalgar Square for Charing Cross".

== History ==
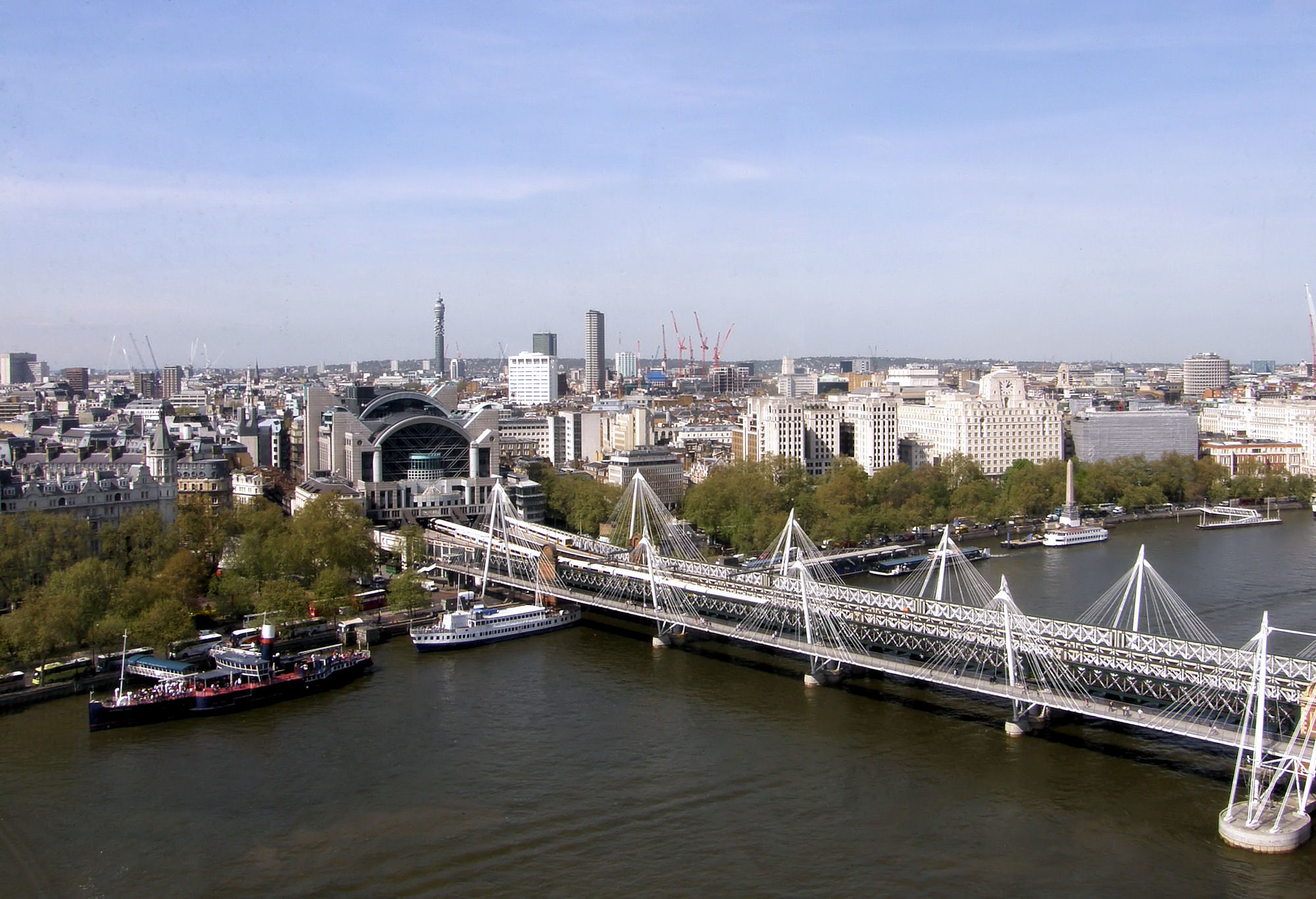
Trains to and from Charing Cross go over Hungerford Bridge to cross the River Thames.

The station was planned as the London terminus of the South Eastern Railway (SER). They had wanted to extend the line from Bricklayers Arms towards Hungerford Bridge, but a bill presented in 1846 was unsuccessful. In 1857, they proposed to Parliament that they would build a railway terminus in the West End, hoping to use Victoria, before reaching an agreement with the London, Brighton and South Coast Railway to build a line west from London Bridge.

Charing Cross Railway Act 1859
- Act of Parliament
- Parliament of the United Kingdom
- Long title: An Act for the making and maintaining of the Charing Cross Railway, and for other Purposes.
- Citation: 22 & 23 Vict. c. lxxxi

Dates
- Royal assent: 8 August 1859

Charing Cross Railway (City Terminus) Act 1861
- Act of Parliament
- Parliament of the United Kingdom
- Long title: An Act for authorizing the Charing Cross Railway to make a Line of Railway from their authorized Line into the City of London, with an additional Line in Southwark, and to raise further Monies; and for other Purposes.
- Citation: 24 & 25 Vict. c. xciii

Dates
- Royal assent: 28 June 1861

Charing Cross Railway (City Terminus Bridge) Act 1862
- Act of Parliament
- Parliament of the United Kingdom
- Long title: An Act for amending "The Charing Cross Railway (City Terminus) Act, 1861."
- Citation: 25 & 26 Vict. c. ccxx

Dates
- Royal assent: 7 August 1862
Other legislation
Amends	Charing Cross Railway (City Terminus) Act 1861

Later in the year, the SER secretary Samuel Smiles looked for potential routes and decided the best location would be on the site of the former Hungerford Market adjacent to The Strand, and that the line should be directly connected to Waterloo, allowing a link with London and South Western Railway services. The Charing Cross Railway Company was formed by the Charing Cross Railway Act 1859 (22 & 23 Vict. c. lxxxi) in order to build the extension, and the SER paid £300,000 (now £32,600,000) in capital to help build this. The line towards Charing Cross was expensive to build as it traversed a heavily built-up area, which was exacerbated in 1862 when the company chose to upgrade the two running lines to three, and doubled the capacity over the bridge to four tracks. The bridge replaced the original suspension bridge designed by Isambard Kingdom Brunel which opened in 1845. (Note: The scrap ironwork from the old Charing Cross bridge was later used to build the Clifton Suspension Bridge.) Work began in June 1860 and took around three years. The old suspension bridge remained open until the new Hungerford Bridge was suitable to carry foot traffic. A trial run over the new line took place on 1 December 1863.

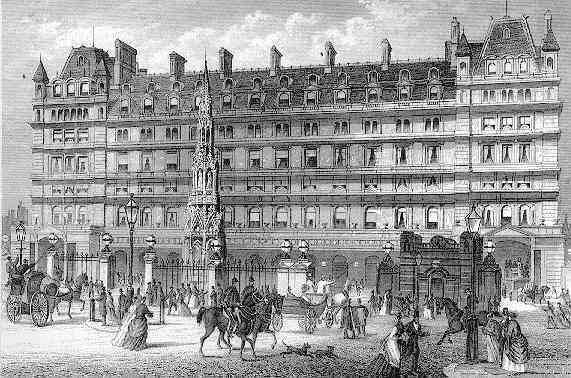
The front entrance of Charing Cross station in a 19th-century print. The reimagined Charing Cross is in front of the Charing Cross Hotel.

Charing Cross Railway Act 1863
- Act of Parliament
- Parliament of the United Kingdom
- Long title: An Act for regulating the Capital and Debenture Debt of the Charing Cross Railway Company; and for authorizing the Amalgamation of that Company with the South-eastern Railway Company; and for other Purposes.
- Citation: 26 & 27 Vict. c. cxv

Dates
- Royal assent: 13 July 1863

Revised text of statute as amended

The station was designed by Sir John Hawkshaw, and featured a single span wrought iron roof, 510 feet (155 m) long and 164 feet (50 m) wide, arching over the six platforms on its relatively cramped site. It was built on a brick arched viaduct, the level of the rails above the ground varying up to 30 feet (9 m). The space underneath the line was used as wine cellars. The roof above the tracks is a single 164-foot (50 m) wide great arch, rising to 102 feet (31 m) at its highest point. The station was built by Lucas Brothers.

Charing Cross Railway Act 1864
- Act of Parliament
- Parliament of the United Kingdom
- Long title: An Act for authorizing the Charing Cross Railway Company to acquire additional Lands at or near to their Cannon Street Station in the City of London, and to raise further Monies; and for other Purposes.
- Citation: 27 & 28 Vict. c. cxcii

Dates
- Royal assent: 14 July 1864

Text of statute as originally enacted

Charing Cross station opened on 11 January 1864. The Charing Cross Railway was absorbed into the SER on 1 September, shortly after the station opened.

The Charing Cross Hotel, designed by Edward Middleton Barry, and built by Lucas Brothers, opened on 15 May 1865 and gave the station an ornate frontage in the French Renaissance style. It had 250 bedrooms spread over seven floors and extended along Villiers Street as well as the front of the Strand. The public rooms had balconies overlooking the main station concourse. It quickly became popular and was profitable, leading to a 90-bedroom annexe on the other side of Villiers Street opening in 1878. A bridge over the street connected the two parts of the hotel together.

In 1887, Hungerford Bridge was widened to 48 feet 9 inches (14.86 m) in order to provide three more tracks into the station. On 1 January 1899, the SER merged with the London, Chatham and Dover Railway to form the South Eastern and Chatham Railway (SECR), which took over operations at Charing Cross.

=== Eleanor Cross ===
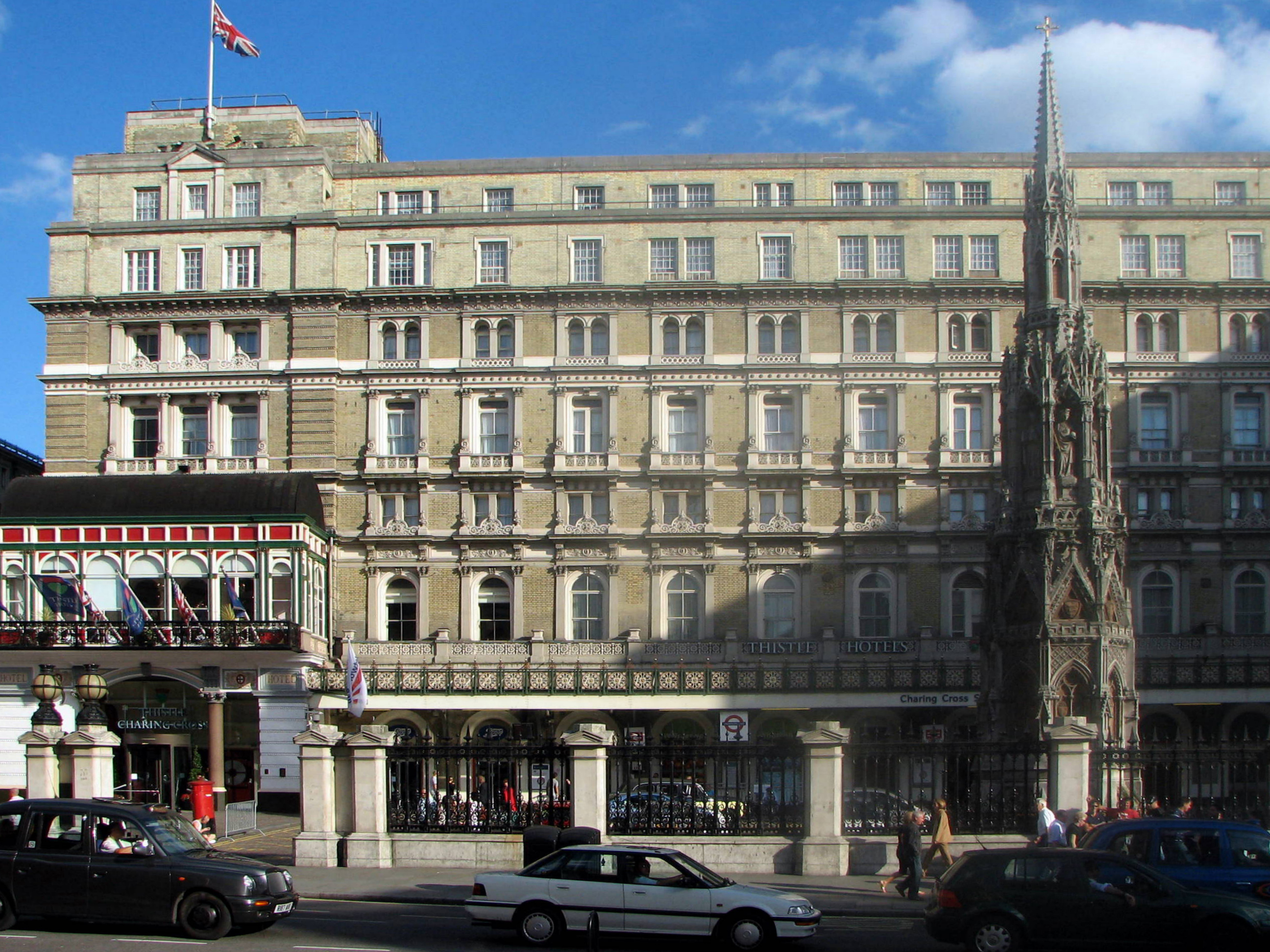
A replica of the Eleanor Cross in Charing Cross station forecourt

Contemporary with the Charing Cross Hotel was a replica of the Eleanor Cross in Red Mansfield stone, also designed by Edward Middleton Barry, that was erected in the station forecourt. It was based on the original Whitehall Cross built in 1291, that had been demolished in 1647 by order of Parliament. Distances in London are officially measured from the original site of the cross, now the statue of Charles I facing Whitehall, and not from this replica.

The cross deteriorated over time until it was in such a vulnerable condition that it was placed on English Heritage's "Heritage At Risk Register" in 2008. A ten-month project to repair and restore the cross was completed in August 2010. This work included recreating and attaching almost 100 missing ornamental features including heraldic shields, an angel, pinnacles, crockets and finials; securing weak or fractured masonry with stainless steel pins and rods and re-attaching decorative items which had previously been removed after becoming loose.

=== International services ===
After opening, Charing Cross became the main terminus of all SER services instead of London Bridge, including boat trains to Continental Europe. Along with Victoria, it became the main departure point from London to abroad, and was called "the Gates of the World" by Percy Fitzgerald. Thomas Cook established a travel office on the corner of the station forecourt. The SER route became the shortest from London to Dover after a diversion at Sevenoaks was built in 1868, and by 1913 it was possible to travel from Charing Cross to Paris in six and a half hours.

Owing to its international connections, Charing Cross played an important part in World War I as the main departure point for both the military and government towards the Western Front. All civilian and public boat services were suspended on 3 August 1914. Return journeys from Dover carried the sick and wounded towards Charing Cross and hence to hospitals around the country. Over the course of the war, 283 journeys departed from the station. On 26 December 1918, shortly after the war, the US President Woodrow Wilson met King George V at Charing Cross. Commercial cross-Channel services resumed to Ostend on 18 January 1919, Boulogne on 3 February and Calais on 8 January 1920, but by this time, Victoria had been expanded to accommodate the strict wartime immigration and customs checks, and Charing Cross ceased to be important as an international terminal.

=== 1905 roof collapse ===
A 70-foot (21 m) length of the original roof structure, comprising the two end bays at the south of the station, and part of the western wall collapsed at 3:57 p.m. on 5 December 1905. A gang of men were employed at the time in repairing, glazing and painting the section of roof which fell. Shortly after 3:45 p.m, the roof emitted a loud noise, which was when someone noticed that one of the main tie rods had broken and was hanging down. Part of the roof began to sag and the western wall began to crack.

It was another 12 minutes before the collapse occurred, which enabled trains and platforms to be evacuated and incoming trains to be held back. The roof, girders and debris fell across four passenger trains, blocking all tracks. The part of the western wall that fell had crashed through the wall and roof of the neighbouring Royal Avenue Theatre (now the Playhouse Theatre) in Northumberland Avenue, which was being reconstructed at the time. Six people died (two workmen on the roof, a W.H. Smith bookstall vendor and three workmen on the Royal Avenue Theatre site).

At the Board of Trade Inquiry into the accident, expert witnesses expressed doubts about the design of the roof, even though the cause of the failure was attributed to a faulty weld in a tie rod. Though the SECR believed the roof had a lifespan of at least forty more years, they decided not to repair it but to replace it entirely. A travelling timber gantry had to be constructed to take the remainder of the station roof down safely. The replacement was a utilitarian post and girder structure supporting a ridge and furrow roof. The curve of the original roof design can still be seen on the interior brickwork. The station was partially re-opened on 19 March 1906.

The old booking offices were demolished and the various rooms on the ground floor were rearranged. A new 58-by-22-foot (17.7 m × 6.7 m) booking hall was constructed, along with a separate ladies' waiting-room. The additional remedial work was completed in 1913.

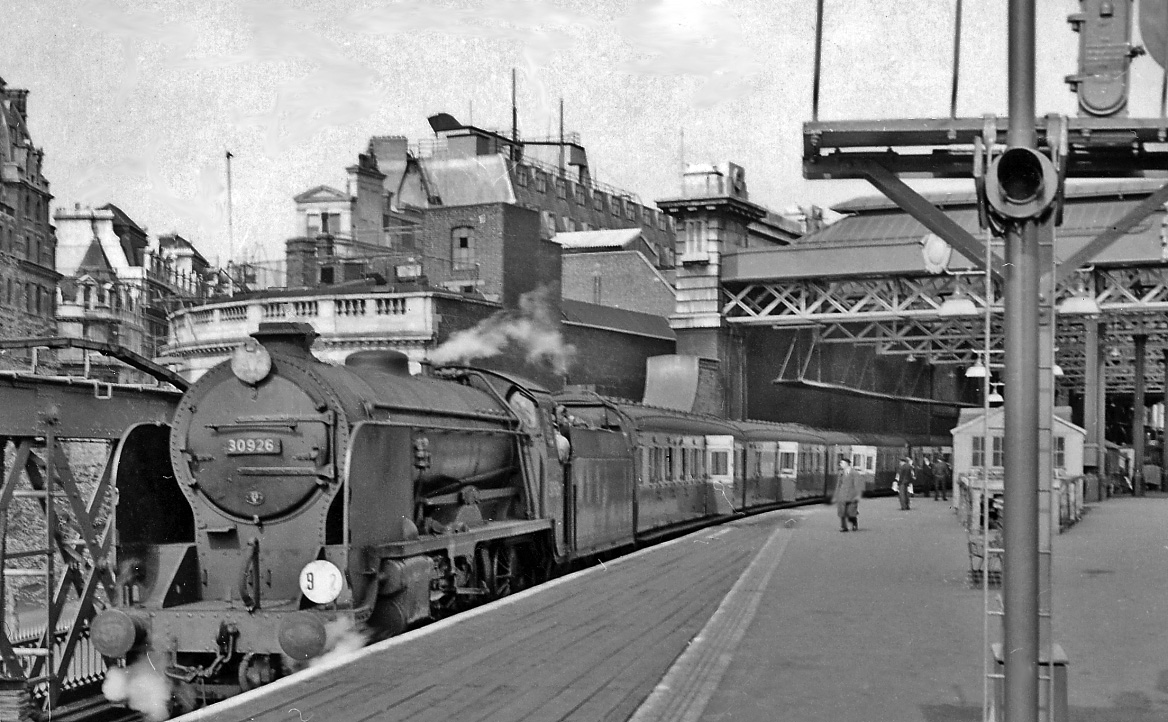
Express train to Hastings in 1957, showing the station roof before its late 1980s reconstruction

=== Proposed closure and relocation ===
By the late 19th century, Charing Cross was seen as being inconveniently placed. In 1889, the newly formed London County Council's John Burns proposed that the station and its approach should be demolished, with a road bridge put in place. The idea gained support within the council as it would allow the Strand to be widened and put a road crossing over the Thames that could bypass Whitehall. When the SECR went to Parliament asking for an act to strengthen the bridge in 1916, Burns suggested the station was in the wrong place and should be rebuilt on the south side of the Thames. The following year, an act was passed to reconstruct the bridge, with strict conditions about its appearance and a ban on enlarging the station building itself.

Ownership of Charing Cross passed to the Southern Railway (SR) in 1923 following the Big Four grouping. The line was electrified in 1926 to cater for suburban services. The lighter load of multiple-unit electric trains was found to put far less strain on the bridge, and so traffic was redesigned so that local services ran on the older section, with mainline services using the 1887 extension.

In 1926, the Royal Commission on Cross River Traffic proposed that Hungerford Bridge should be replaced by a double deck road / rail bridge, and a new Charing Cross station built to the east of the old one. The SR approved the idea as it would allow them to expand the station. Two years later, a proposal appeared again to build just a road bridge and relocate the station south of the Thames, as it was significantly cheaper. The Prime Minister Stanley Baldwin urged the SR to accept the proposal, as "a matter of national importance", but the bill failed in 1930 after the select committee did not accept building a new Charing Cross on the south bank. The proposal was formally rejected in 1936 by the London & Home Counties Traffic Advisory Committee, which revived the double-deck bridge option. The plans were all abandoned following the outbreak of World War II.

=== World War II ===
Charing Cross sustained substantial damage in air-raids during the war. On 8 October 1940, a train was hit during a daylight raid on Whitehall. On the evening of 16/17 April 1941, the hotel was damaged by fire and explosives, four trains caught fire and there were several fires on the bridge. A 28 long hundredweight (3,100 lb; 1,400 kg) parachute mine landed next to platform 4. The station was closed to repair the damage and defuse the mine. A further raid took place on the night of 10/11 May, leading to the station's closure again. On 18 June 1944, a bomb took out a span of the bridge. Normal operation did not resume until 4 December.

Following the war, the hotel received extensive repairs in 1951. This consisted of a whole new set of top floors, while the mansard roof of the upper floors of the hotel was rebuilt in a plain neo-Georgian white brick.

=== Modernisation ===
The booking hall and ticket offices were modernised in 1974. Electronic ticket printing was first trialled at the station in 1983.

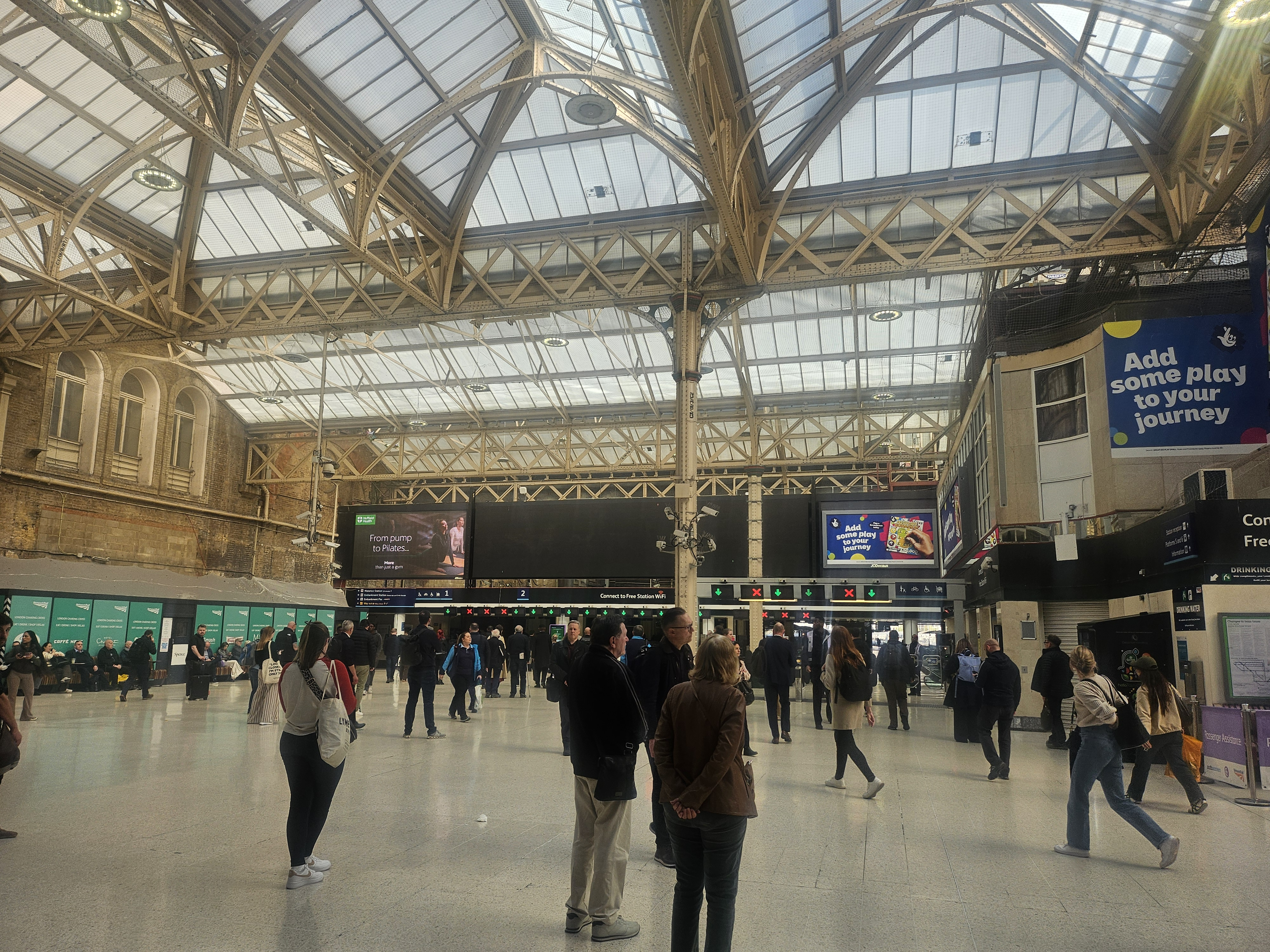
Station concourse

In 1986, redevelopment began over most of the area above the platforms. The new buildings were named Embankment Place, a postmodern office and shopping complex designed by Terry Farrell and Partners. This development led to the replacement of almost the whole of the 1906 roof. The rear two spans of this structure – immediately adjacent to the existing concourse roof – were retained as part of an enlarged waiting area. In addition the original retaining side walls of the station which once supported it remain in near complete condition. The works were completed in November 1990. Most of the Embankment Place complex is office space, with a selection of restaurants on the ground floor.

In 2026, Charing Cross and Waterloo East were closed for 22 days during a £20 million programme of engineering works. The works included the replacement of 1.8 km (1.1 mi) of track between the stations and 16 sets of switches and crossings, the rebuilding of sections of all six platforms at Charing Cross, and structural repairs to Hungerford Bridge.

== Services ==
The station has six platforms. All trains call at Waterloo East and London Bridge.

All services at London Charing Cross are operated by Southeastern.

The typical off-peak service in trains per hour (tph) is:

- 4 tph to Dartford via Sidcup of which 2 continue to Gravesend
- 1 tph to Dartford via Bexleyheath
- 4 tph to Hayes via Catford Bridge
- 2 tph to Sevenoaks via Grove Park
- 1 tph to Dover Priory
- 1 tph to Ramsgate via Canterbury West
- 2 tph to Hastings via Tunbridge Wells (1 semi-fast, 1 stopping)
- 1 tph to Maidstone East via Swanley

Preceding station	National Rail	Following station
Terminus	Southeastern South Eastern Main Line	Waterloo East
	Historical railways	
Terminus	South Eastern Railway South Eastern Main Line	London Blackfriars

== London Underground ==
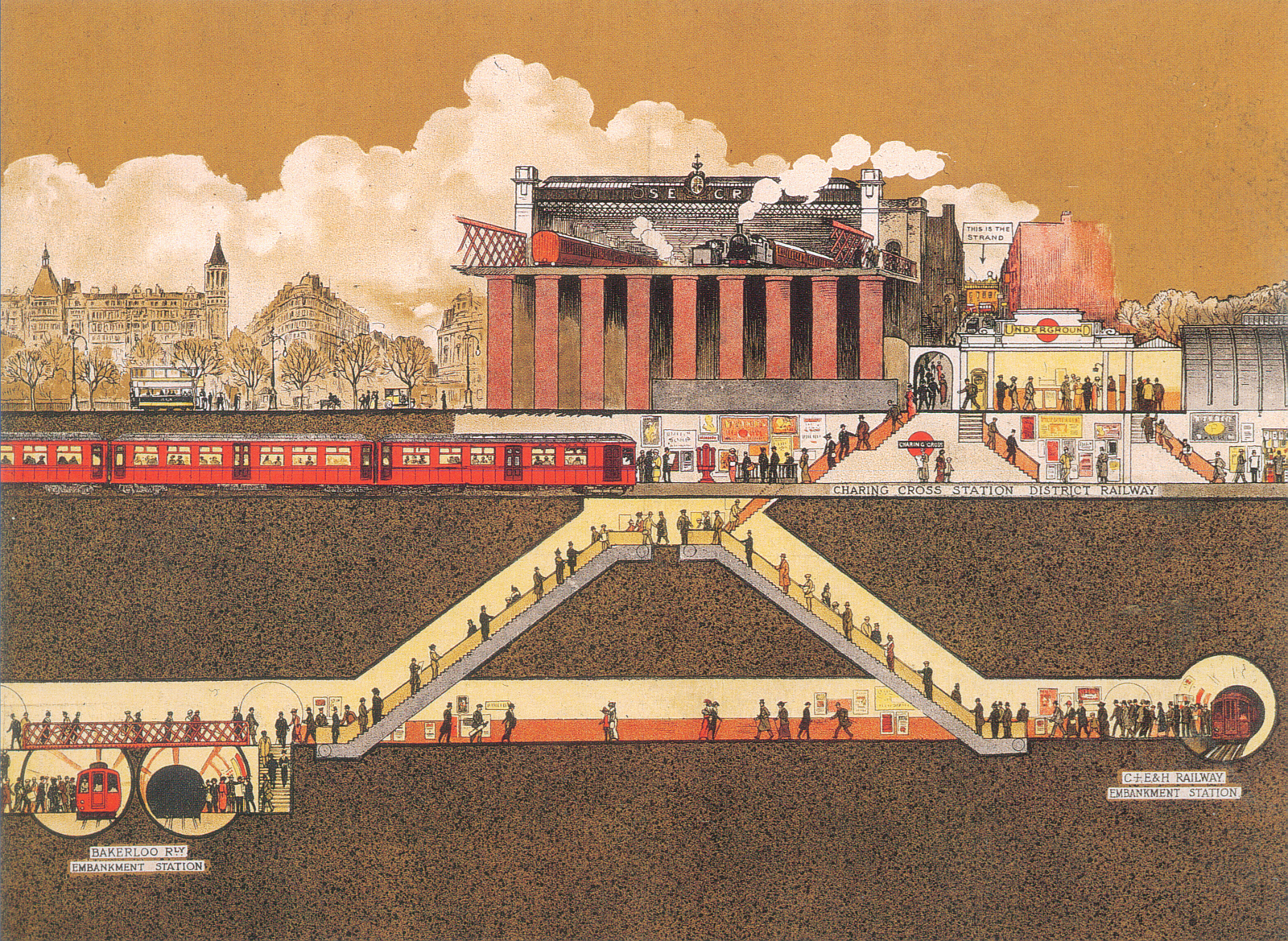
Cross section through Embankment station from 1914 showing the various London Underground lines beneath Charing Cross

The station is served by two London Underground stations, both within walking distance of the mainline terminal and sited at each end: Charing Cross (to the north), and Embankment (to the south). Both stations have an Oyster Out of Station Interchange, which allows passengers to change lines while still being charged as a single journey.

Numerous proposals for underground connections for the mainline station were considered in the decades after its opening. Almost as soon as work was complete on the station, the SER wanted to build a connection from Charing Cross to the railway terminals further north. Soon after Charing Cross station opened, the North Western and Charing Cross Railway Act was passed, a joint act between the SER and the London and North Western Railway (LNWR) that proposed a shallow sub-surface line to Euston. The scheme collapsed in 1866 due to a shortage of funding caused by a banking crisis. The scheme was revived with the London Central Railway, that proposed to link Charing Cross to Euston and St Pancras, but was again abandoned in 1874.

The first underground railway to serve Charing Cross was the District Railway (now the District line), which opened its station at Charing Cross on 30 May 1870.

In 1884, bills were submitted to parliament by the Charing Cross and Euston Railway and the London Central Subway for sub-surface underground lines between Charing Cross and Euston and Charing Cross and King's Cross respectively and by the King's Cross, Charing Cross and Waterloo Subway for a deep-level railway linking the three terminals in its name. None of the three plans proceeded.

The Baker Street and Waterloo Railway (now the Bakerloo line) constructed a deep-level tube line on the west side of the station in the late 19th century, which opened on 10 March 1906 with a new station in Trafalgar Square and an interchange with the District Railway's station. The link between Charing Cross and Euston was finally built by the Charing Cross, Euston and Hampstead Railway (now part of the Northern line) as a deep-level tube line in 1906 which opened its station under the forecourt of the mainline station on 22 June 1907. (Note: While the mainline station was closed for reconstruction of the roof, the Charing Cross, Euston and Hampstead Railway was able to get permission from the SER to excavate the forecourt for six weeks to start construction of their ticket hall beneath. The previous intention was to have excavated upwards from platform level.)

Originally, Embankment tube station was called Charing Cross, while the present Charing Cross tube station was the separate Trafalgar Square (Bakerloo line) and Strand (Northern line) stations. The two northern stations were combined under the current name when connected by the development of the Jubilee line. New below ground passageways were constructed linking the platforms so that an interchange could be made. The Northern line's Strand station was temporarily closed from 1974 to enable new escalators to be installed and it reopened along with the opening of the Jubilee line on 1 May 1979. The Jubilee line platforms were closed on 20 November 1999, following the extension of the Jubilee line where it was diverted to Westminster and onwards south of the River Thames.

== Accidents and incidents ==
On 25 October 1913, two trains collided in thick fog at Waterloo junction, killing three people. On 31 July 1925, there was a minor side-on collision near platform 2.

In May 1927, a trunk was deposited in Charing Cross station's cloakroom that contained the five severed body parts of Minnie Alice Bonati. She was later identified as having been murdered in Rochester Row by John Robinson, who was convicted of the Charing Cross Trunk Murder, for which he was later executed.

On 19 September 1928, a train formed of two 3SUB electric multiple units and a trailer set ran into the buffers. Sixty-eight people were injured, 45 of whom were treated at the Charing Cross Hospital.

== Cultural references ==
The Maggie Hambling statue A Conversation with Oscar Wilde is directly opposite the station. It was erected in 1998 and designed for people to sit on the monument and have a virtual conversation with Oscar Wilde.

Charing Cross is referenced in numerous Sherlock Holmes stories. In The Adventure of the Abbey Grange, Holmes and Watson catch a train from the station towards the fictional Abbey Grange in Kent, while in The Adventure of the Golden Pince-Nez, they travel to Chatham from the station.
