= Thomas Boddington =

British political activist (1736–1821)

Thomas Boddington (3 June 1736 – 28 June 1821) was a West Indies merchant and political activist in London in the late 18th century.

He lived in Clapton (then in Middlesex). Boddington was involved in the Atlantic slave trade and active as part of the West India lobby, including the London Society of West India Planters and Merchants, but also participated in other committees: the Committee for the Relief of the Black Poor, and the Committees for Repeal of the Test and Corporation Acts. He was a director of the Bank of England (1776–1810) and was on the Board of the London Dock Company. He worked at the Board of Ordnance based at the Tower of London from 1770, where he was the direct superior of Granville Sharp. Along with James Ware, Samuel Bosanquet and William Houlston, Boddington was involved in setting up the School for the Indigent Blind in St George's Fields, Southwark in 1799, housed in the former Dog and Duck tavern.

Both he and his brother, Benjamin Boddington were West Indian merchants, based in 17 Mark Lane, London. He retired in 1794, whereon his son, Benjamin Boddington, took his place. His daughter, Elizabeth, married Isaac Hawkins Browne, MP. His son, Benjamin eloped with his cousin Samuel Boddington's wife, Grace Ashburner. After a court case which awarded £10,000 to Samuel, the couple divorced and Grace married Benjamin in 1798. Grace was the subject of a noted George Romney painting.
