= SeeAbility =

British charitable organisation

SeeAbility (formerly School for the Indigent Blind and Royal School for the Blind) is a UK charity that provides support and campaigns for better eye care for people with learning disabilities, autism and sight loss. In 2017 it reported that 236 people were supported in facilities such as residential homes, supported living and activity and resource centres across the south of England. From 2013, SeeAbility launched its Children in Focus campaign, providing sight tests for children in special schools, after observing that many adults they worked with had not received good eye care when younger.

== History ==
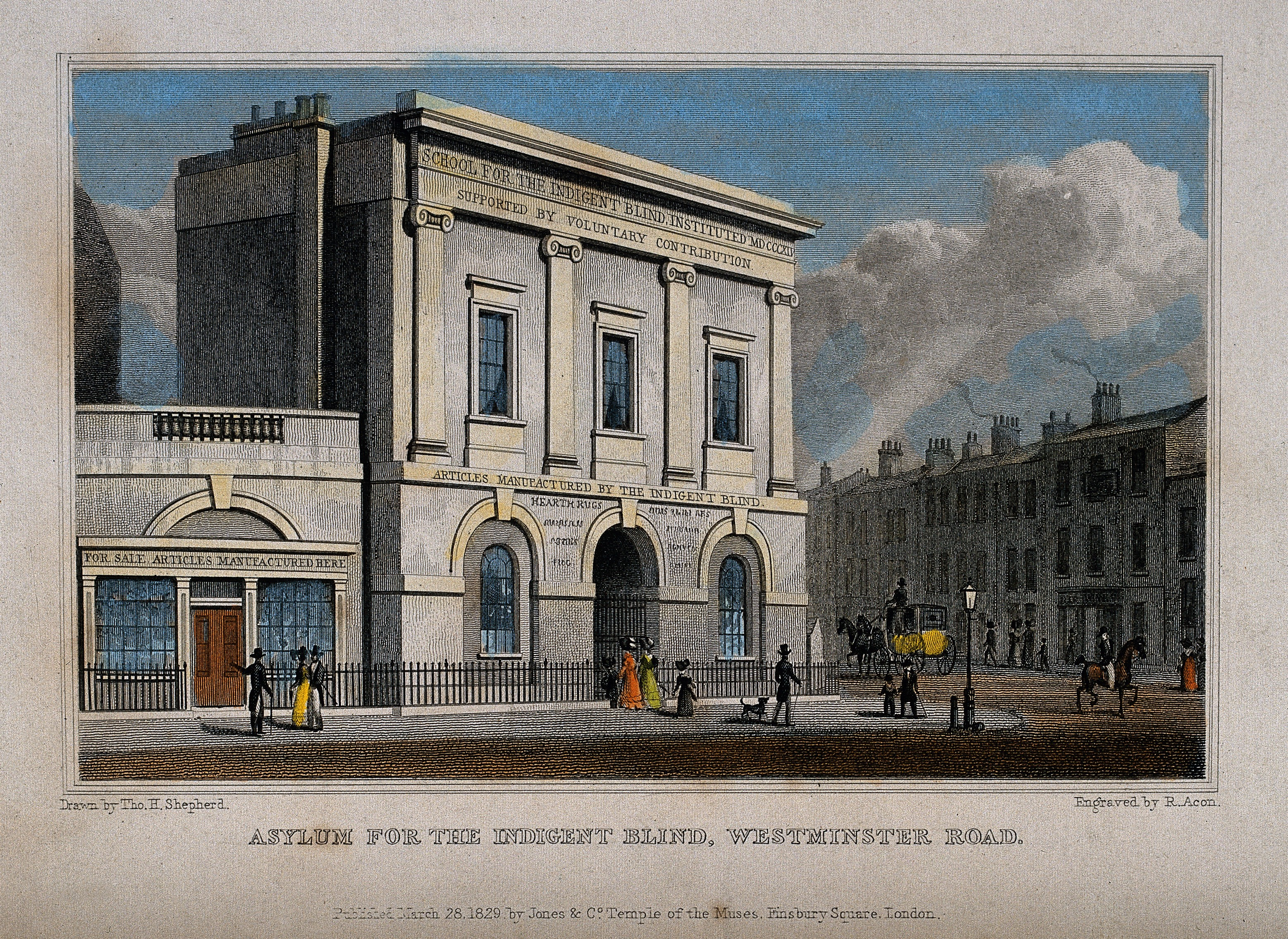
An 1829 coloured engraving of the blind school on Westminster Road, Southwark

The school was founded in 1799 by four philanthropists: London banker Samuel Bosanquet, Thomas Boddington, James Ware (an eye surgeon), and William Houlston (a charity worker). Its original name was The School for the Indigent Blind, and it was established at St George's Fields, Southwark with the intention of educating young blind people and teaching them useful trades.

At first, it was housed in the former Dog and Duck tavern. In 1800 fifteen pupils were housed and instructed in the Long Room. A year or so later the school, with thirty-five male and seventeen female pupils, expanded into the tavern and its gardens. The building was demolished in 1812 to make way for the Bethlem Hospital; the site is now used by the Imperial War Museum within Geraldine Mary Harmsworth Park. Two acres of ground were allotted at the end of Blackfriars Road and a plain school-house for the blind was built. In 1834 additional ground was purchased and the school-house remodelled in the Tudor or domestic Gothic style with a tower and gateway, designed by John Newman.

From the 1860s, it was thought that the school should be moved to "another site more contributive to the health of the inmates and the advantage of the Charity". In 1900, the school committee purchased 15 acres of land in Leatherhead at a cost of £4,000 and C. Pemberton Leach was appointed as architect. Work began on the new school building in May 1901 and the foundation stone was laid by Princess Helena on 13 November.

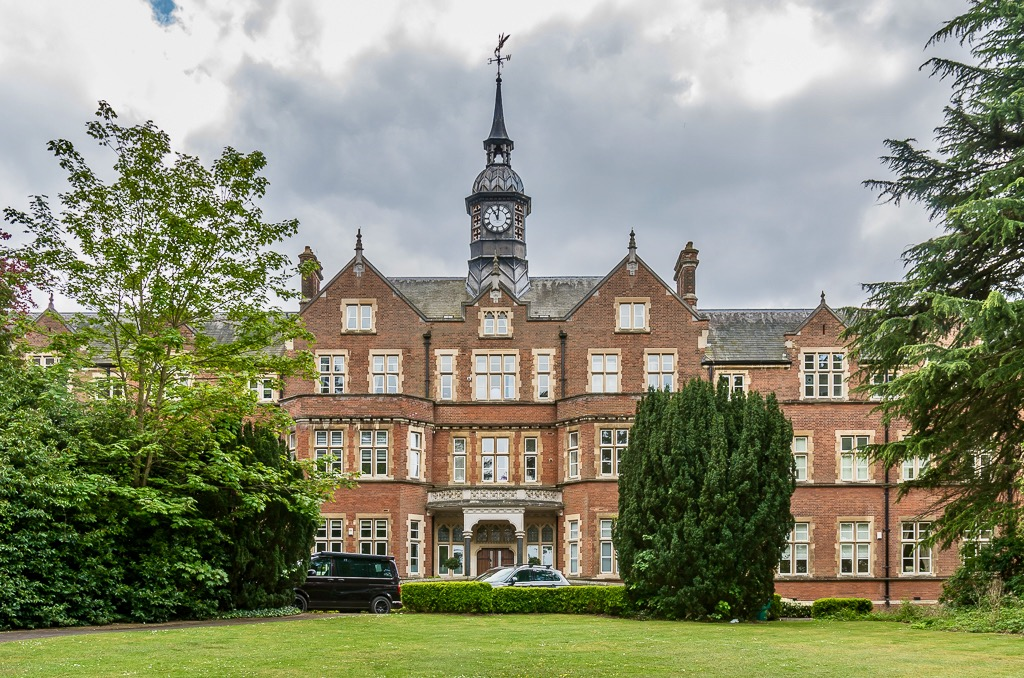
Former main building of the Royal School for the Blind in Leatherhead, Surrey, built 1902-04 (now Lavender Court)

King George V granted the school royal patronage in 1911, and it was renamed The Royal School for the Blind. It consisted of residential workshops and when the Second World War began it was requisitioned by King's College Hospital as a national emergency hospital.

The school underwent rapid change in the 1970s when the accommodation was transformed with individual bedrooms instead of communal dormitories. The new, modernised building was formally opened by Diana, Princess of Wales in November 1982.

In the 1990s the school widened its remit to include people with other physical and learning disabilities and expanded its services to reach out to people in their own homes. It changed its name to SeeAbility in 1994, and adopted the ethos 'Seeing beyond disability'.

The organisation expanded to numerous sites across the south of England during the 1990s, 2000s and 2010s, opening sites in Maidstone, Seaford, Eastleigh, Oxfordshire, Devon, Horley, Tadley, Aldershot and more.

In 1999 SeeAbility opened a residential nursing service called Heather House in Tadley that was built specifically to support 16 younger adults with the very rare, degenerative Juvenile Batten Disease. The service is considered one of the leading providers for people with Juvenile Batten Disease, where the people supported live on average 3–4 years longer than at other services. Since opening, the service has supported almost 30 people with the disease.

In 2013 it launched the Children in Focus campaign, carrying out sight tests in special schools and calling for wide-ranging reforms to eye care for people with learning disabilities and autism. The organisation claims to be the biggest global study on the eye care needs of children with learning disabilities, after carrying out eye tests on over 1000 children in special schools.

In 2017, SeeAbility underwent a brand refresh and changed its strapline to 'Extraordinary every day'. The new logo reduced the size of 'See' and emphasized 'Ability' to reflect its shift in focus from sight loss to the intersection between sight loss and learning disability.

== Children in Focus ==
The Children in Focus campaign was launched in 2013 in four special schools to carry out eye tests on children with learning disabilities and autism. By 2017 it was carrying out eye tests in 8 London schools and a school in Manchester. The charity claims to be the biggest global study on the eye care needs of people with learning disabilities and autism.

In its four year report, Children in Focus - a clear call to action, SeeAbility published its findings, which showed that children with learning disabilities are 28 times more likely to have a sight problem, but much less likely to receive eye care. Nearly half (47.5) had a problem with their vision, a third (31.7%) needed glasses, over four in ten (43.7%) had no history of any eye care and only 7% had ever used a community optician. Of the children with a sight problem, more than a quarter had a problem that was not previously known.

In the 2019 NHS England long term plan, it was announced that the NHS would provide sight and dental testing for all children in special schools across England. This came as a direct result of campaigning by SeeAbility, and SeeAbility are to be involved in its implementation. It is the only known example of a charity successfully campaigning for a change in NHS policy.

== Supporters and ambassadors ==
In 1982, Princess Diana became the patron of SeeAbility and made a number of visits to their services until stepping down in 1996. Since 1999 Birgitte, Duchess of Gloucester has been the Patron. The current president is Lord Coe and the vice-president is former Prime Minister Sir John Major.

In November 2017 the charity organised a fundraising stand-up night with comedians Sally Phillips, Jo Brand and Adam Hills.

In the 2018 New Year's Honours, SeeAbility Eye Care and Vision Development Officer Scott Watkin was awarded a BEM for his work with the charity.

In 2020 SeeAbility appointed their first two celebrity patrons, Amar Latif and Helen Fospero.
