= Duck pond =

Pond that is inhabited by ducks

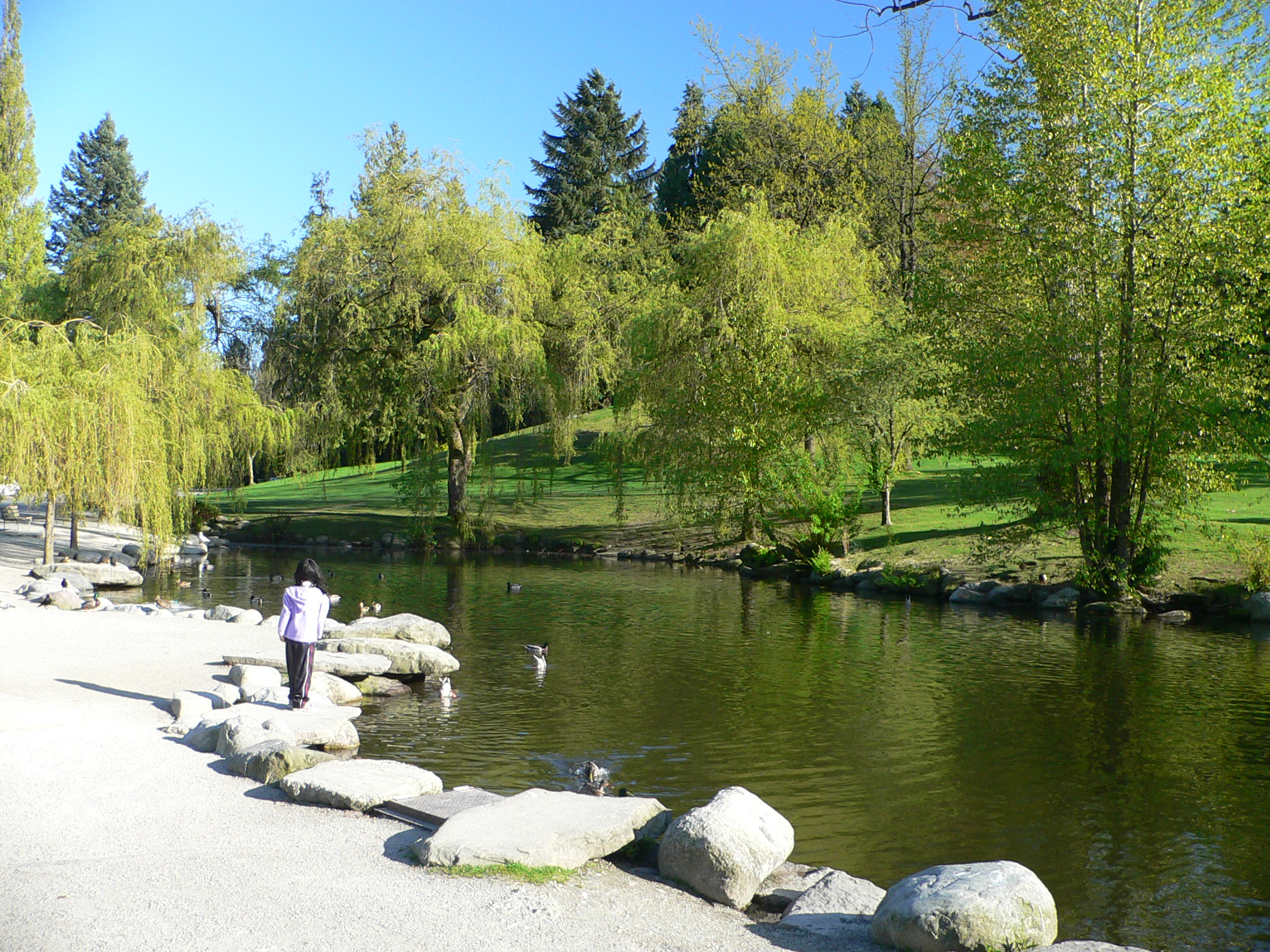
A duck pond in the Queen Elizabeth Park

A duck pond or duckpond is a pond for ducks and other waterfowl. Duck ponds provide habitats for waterfowl and other birds, who use the water to bathe in and drink.

Often, as in public parks, such ponds are artificial and ornamental in design; an example is the lily pond in the University Parks at Oxford in England, constructed in 1925. Sometimes they may be less ornamental, as for example in a farmyard.

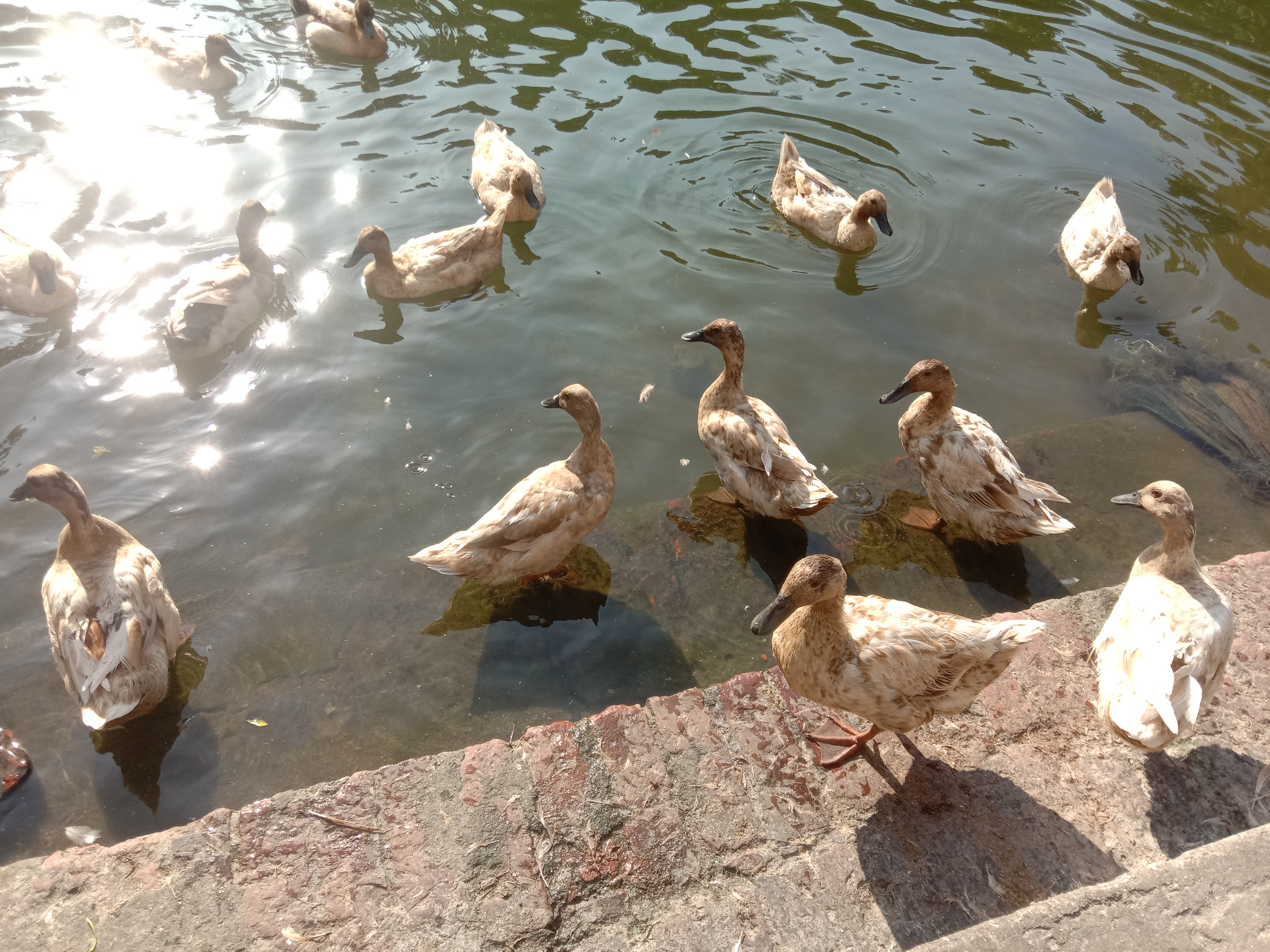
A duck pond and ducks in Howrah, West Bengal, India

Some duck ponds are purposely built for duck hunting. These flight ponds are constructed by hunters and wildfowlers to attract ducks, such as mallard, teals, bufflehead and wigeon, at dawn and at dusk. The ponds have shallow edges to allow ducks to reach food on the bottom. Barley is often used to attract or hold the birds.

== Duck houses ==
A duck house, duck canopy, or duck island, is an often floating structure onto or into which ducks can climb, offering protection from predators such as foxes. Some are simple wooden shelters on land, while others are on islands in duck ponds or lakes; they can be quite ornate and/or large structures. A well-known example can be found at Woodway House in Devon, England. A small domestic version of a duck pond with duck house is at Knowle Farm in Derbyshire. Such houses are also used for the birds to nest in a safe and convenient area. Dummy eggs, originally ceramic and now plastic, are used to encourage birds to lay in the duck house.

=== Installation and maintenance ===
Duck ponds should be cleaned out regularly to prevent an unwanted and smelly buildup of fecal matter that is gradually left behind by the birds using it. They may also be prone to flooding during a storm if they are not raised adequately off the ground.

=== Media reference ===
Duck islands came to public prominence in the United Kingdom in May 2009, when a Member of Parliament claimed expenses to have one installed on his property. Sir Peter Viggers chose to stand down as an MP after he was shown to have attempted to pay for his duck island at the UK Parliament's, and hence UK taxpayers', expense.

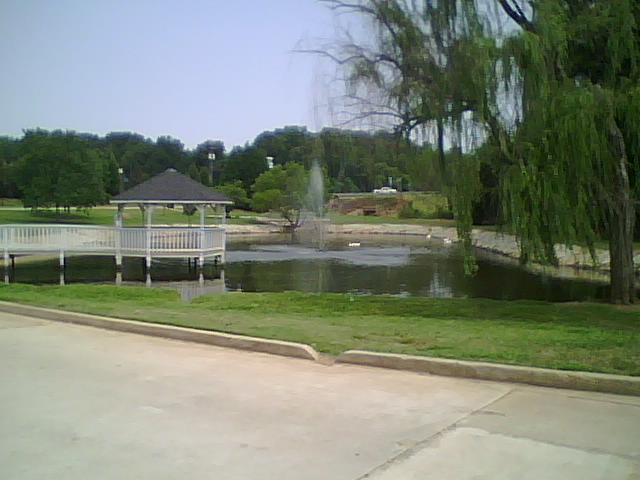
Duck pond with gazebo at apartment in Covington, Georgia, US

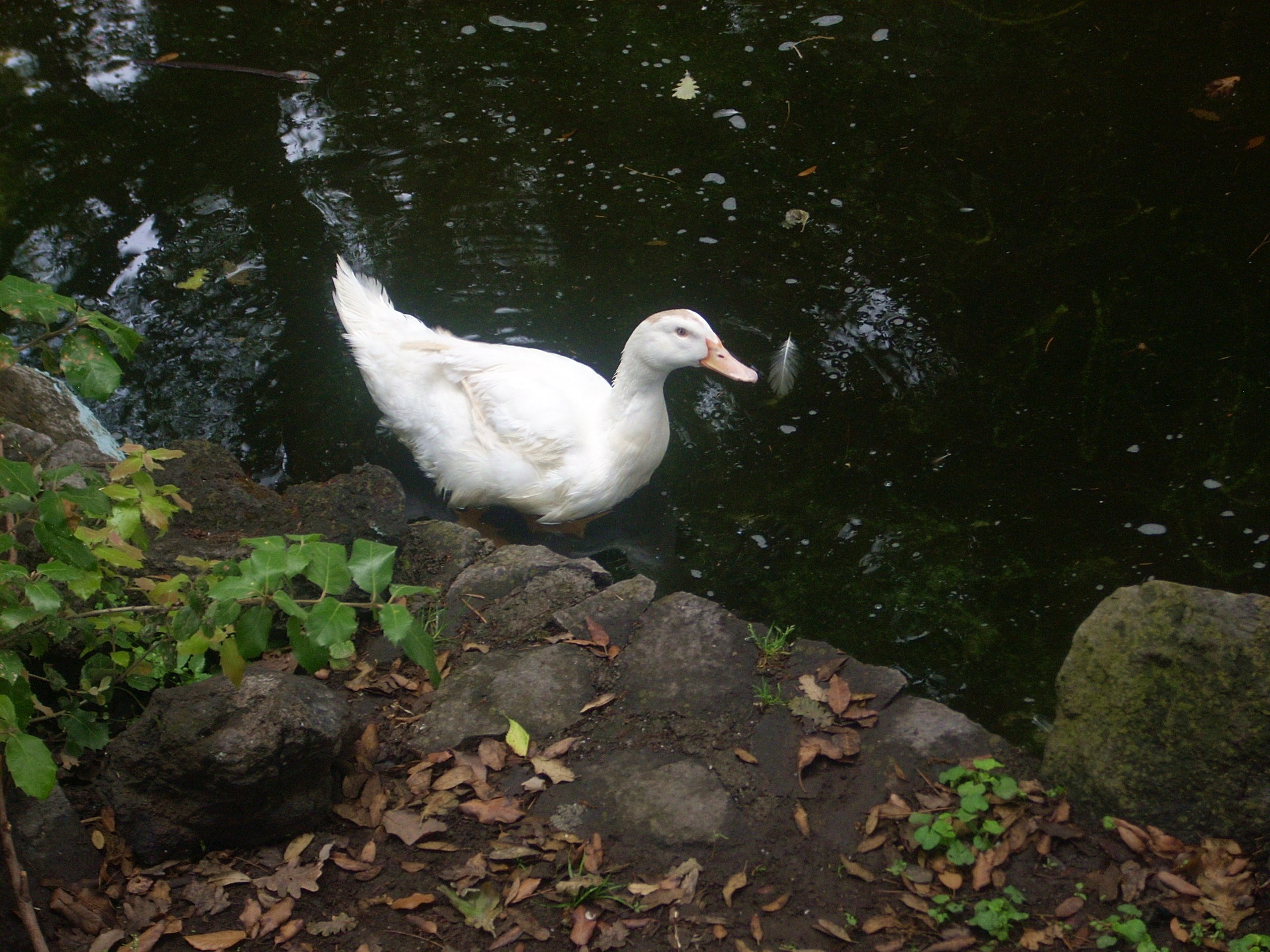
Duck pond in a public park, Aci Sant'Antonio, Sicily

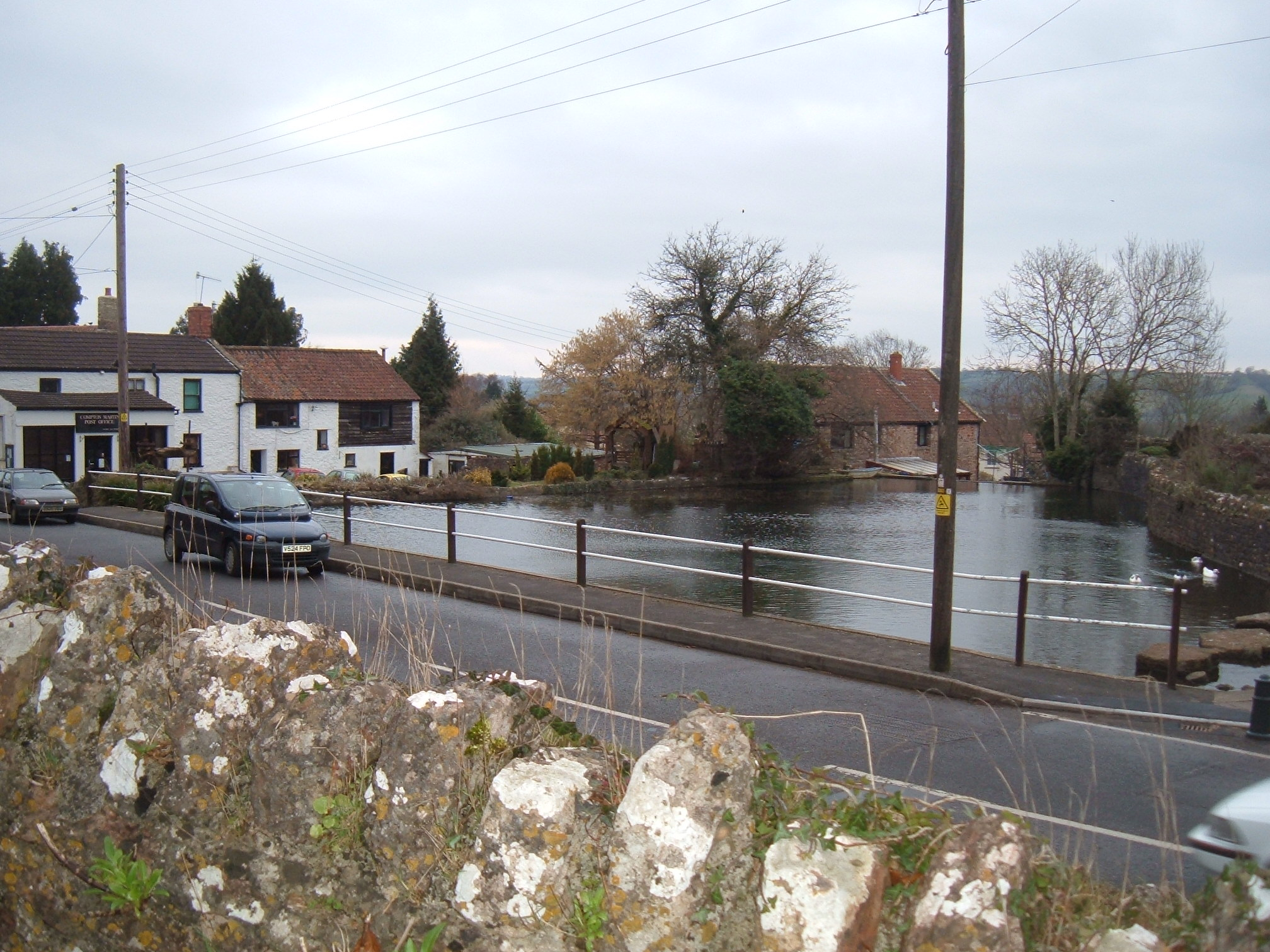
Compton Martin duck pond

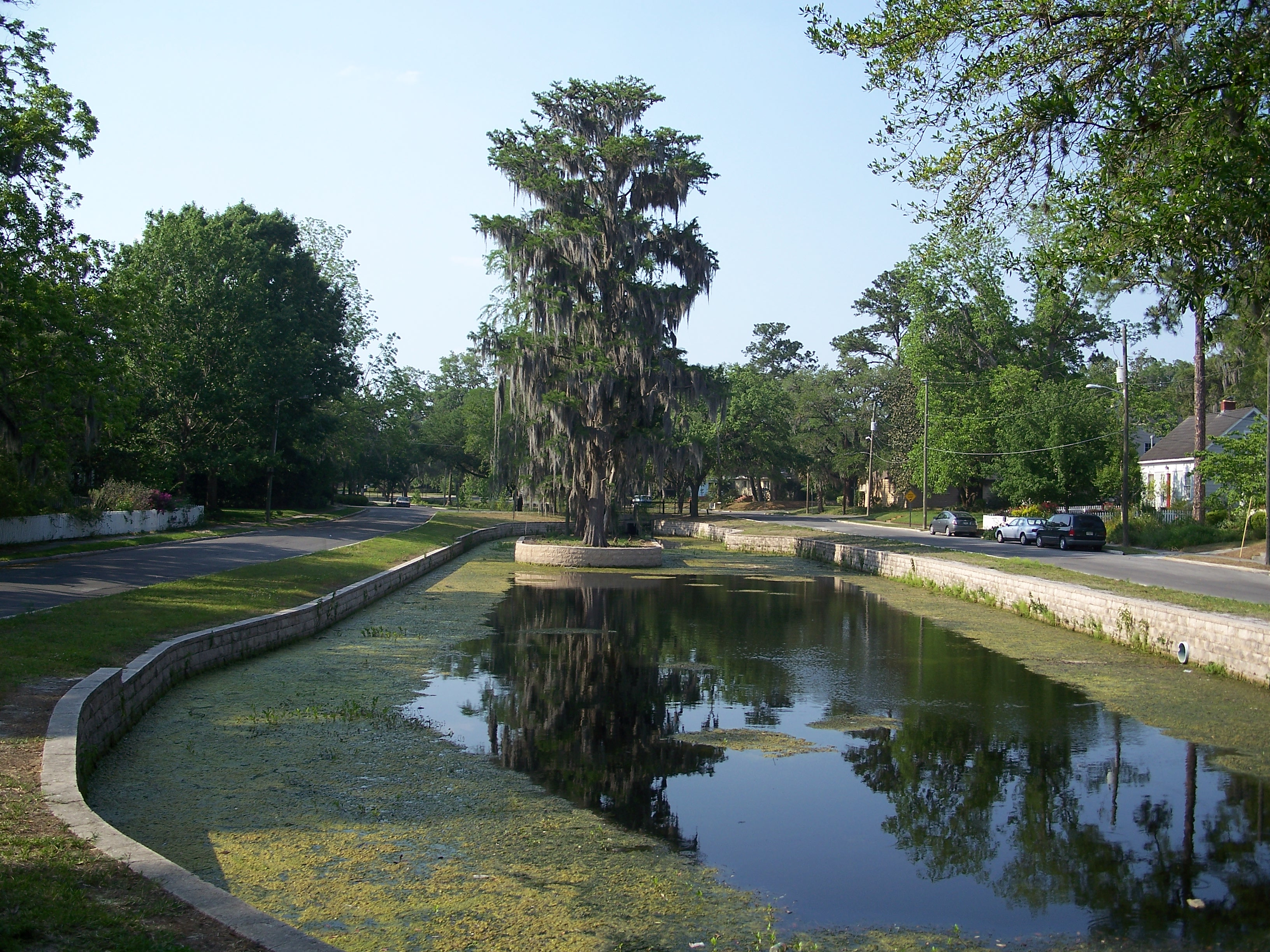
A duck pond in Gainesville, Florida

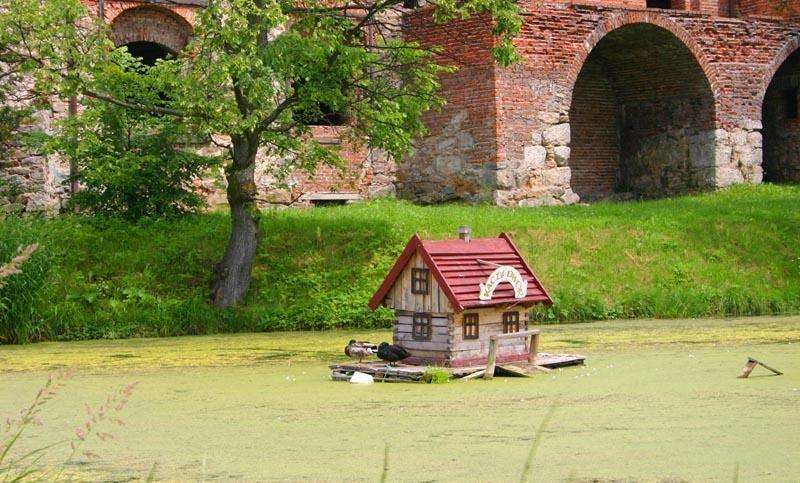
Duck house in Modliszewice, Poland

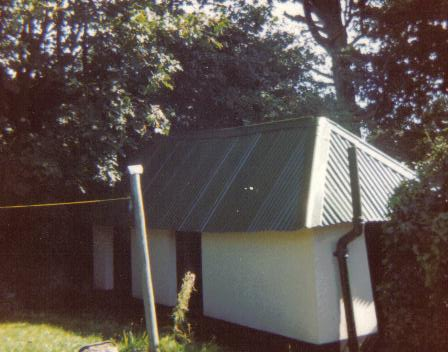
The old cob-built Duck House at Woodway House in Teignmouth, Devon

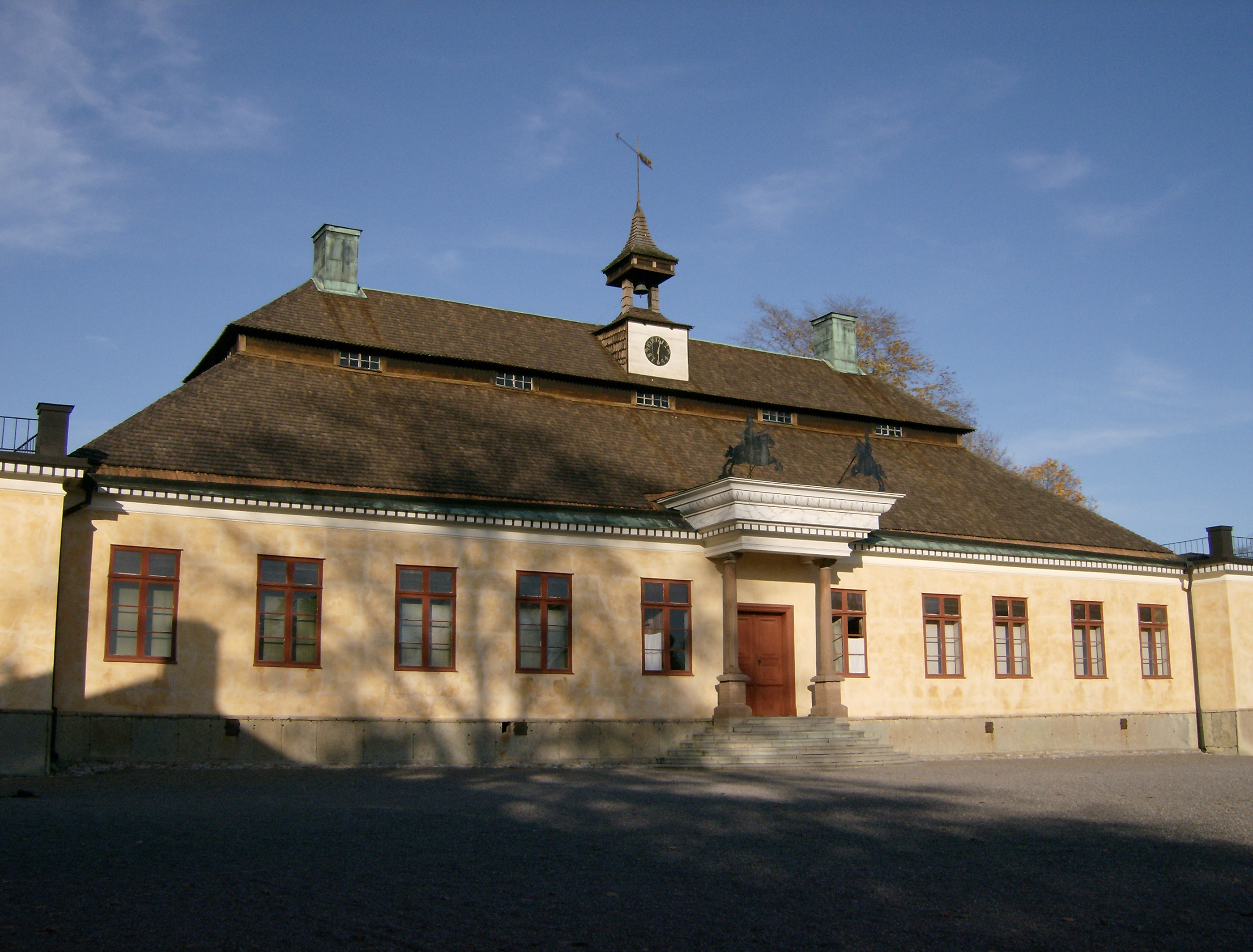
Sir Peter Viggers' duck house was a replica of the Swedish Skogaholm Manor

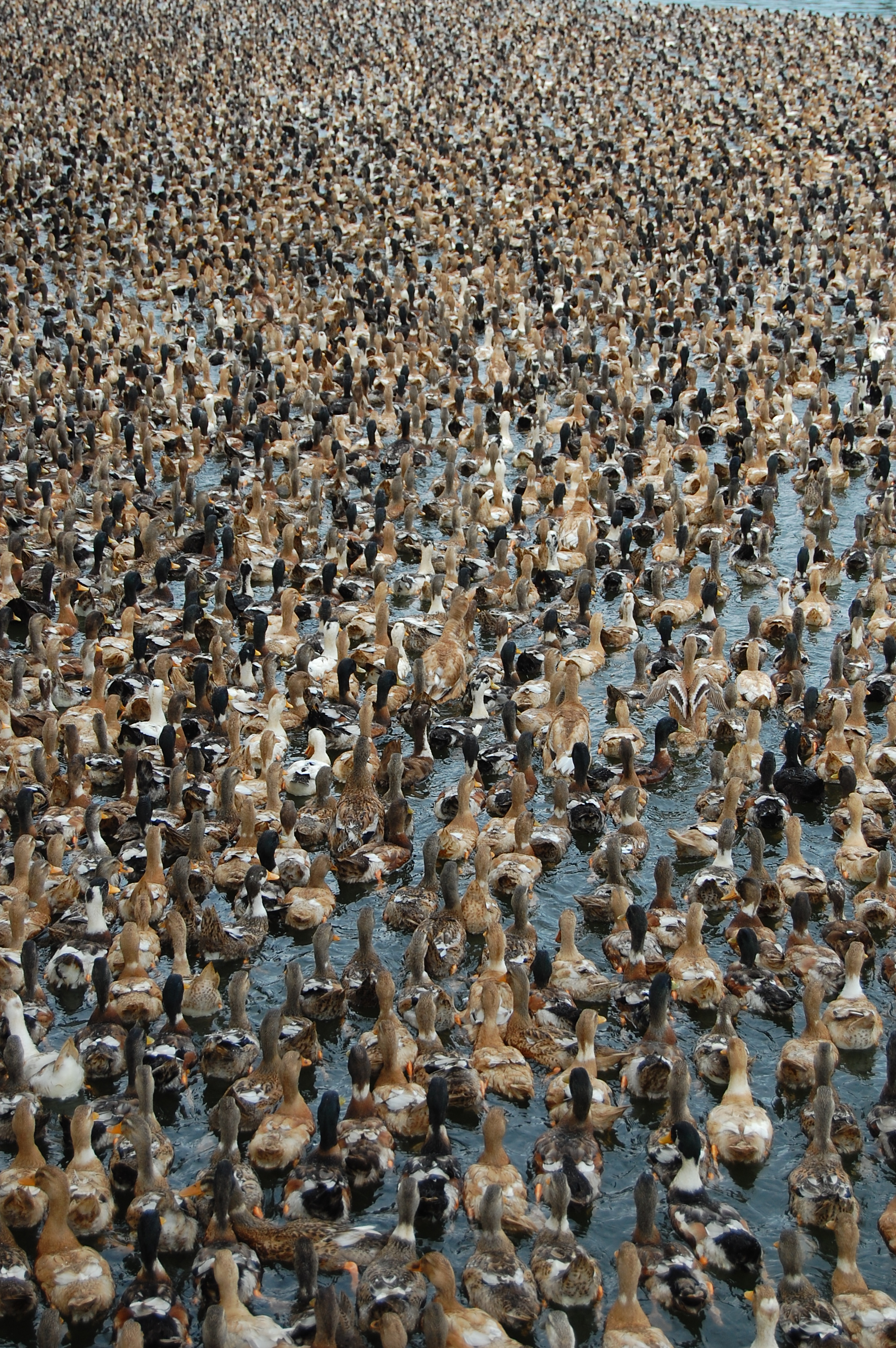
A Duck pond in Alappuzha, Kerala

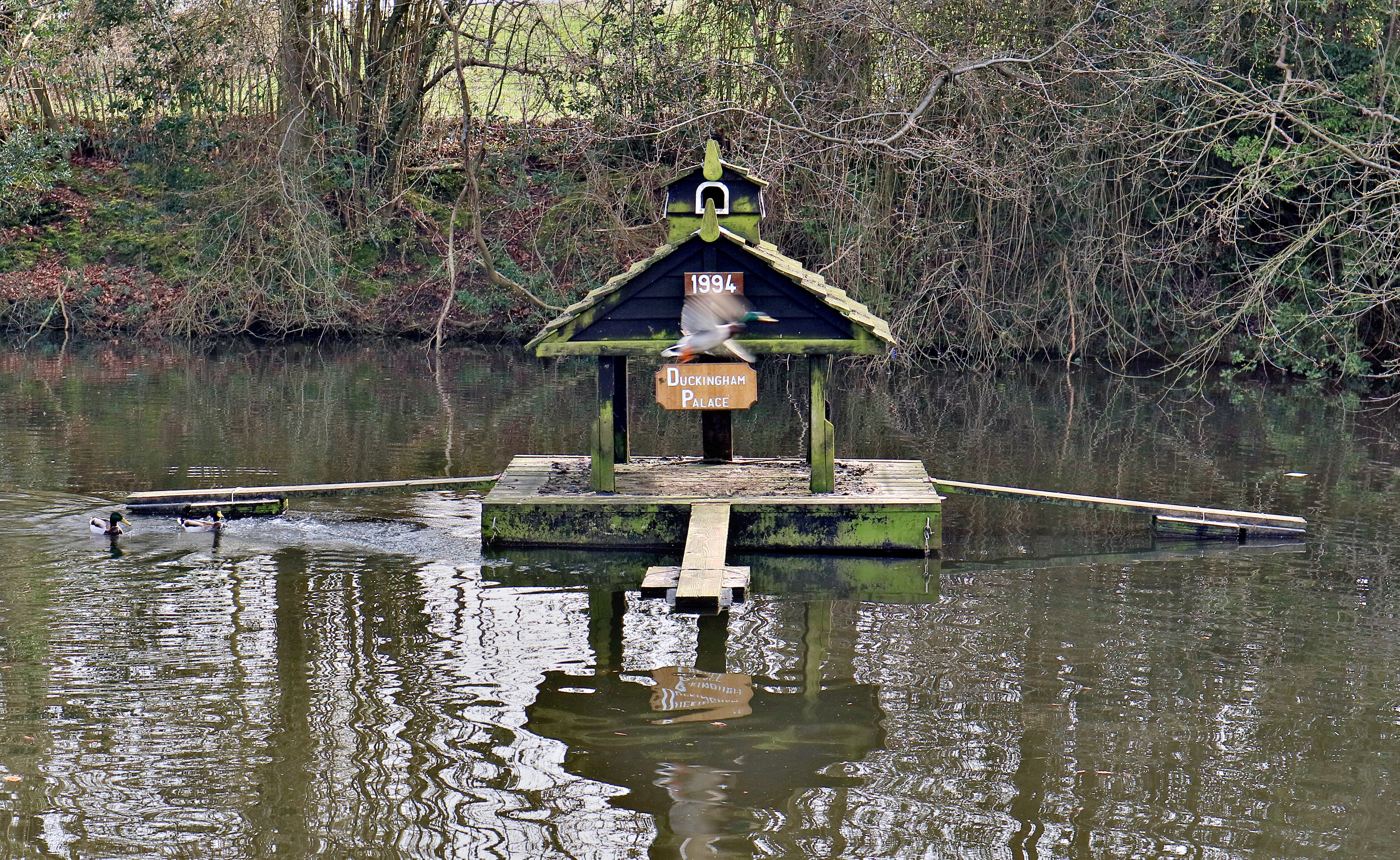
"Duckingham Palace" duck house on Widmore Pond, Sonning Common, UK

== See also ==
- Ponds
- Duck-baiting
- Duck decoy (structure)
- Duck netting
- Duck
- Big Duck building
- Poultry
- Water fountains
- Woodway House
- Hen house
- Dog house
- Pilling's Pond
- Long Duck Pond
