= Duck-baiting =

Blood sport

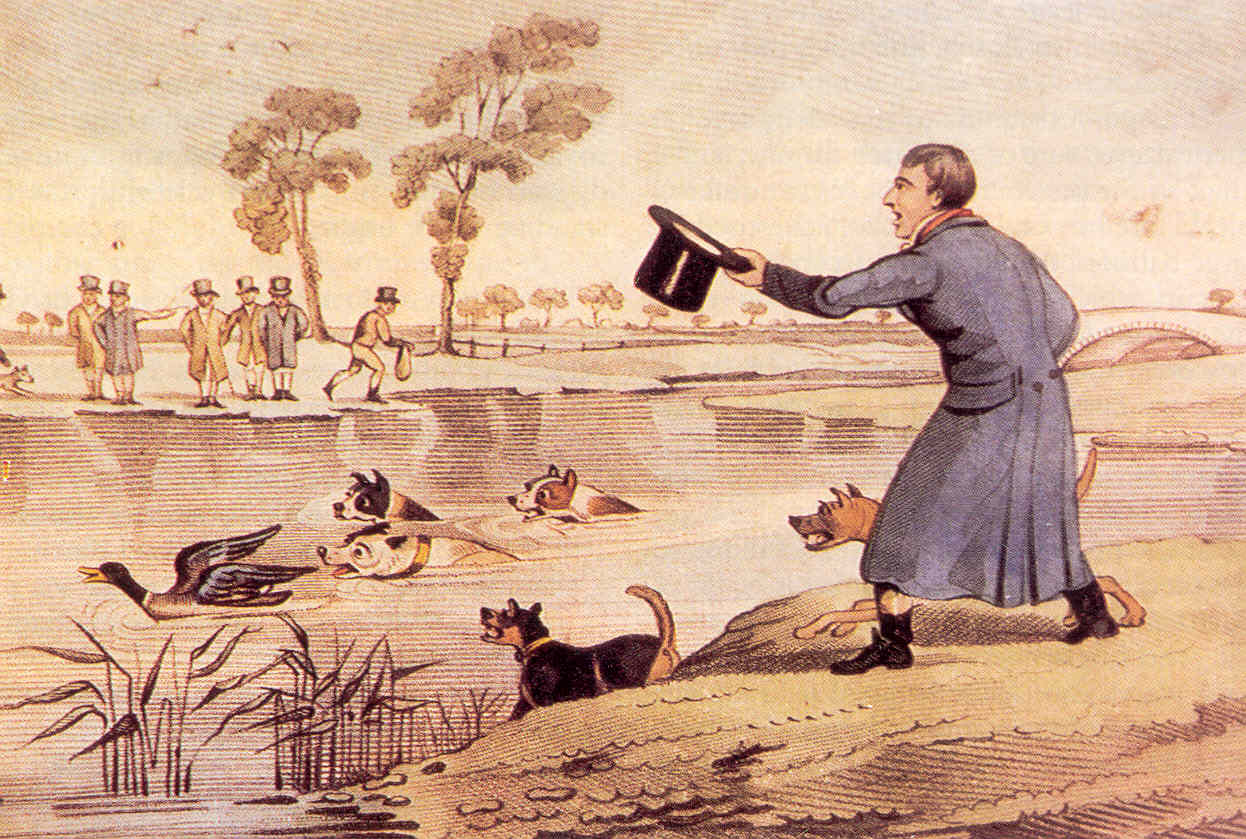
Duck-baiting by Henry Alken circa 1820

Duck-baiting is a blood sport involving the baiting of ducks against dogs.

== Overview ==
Duck-baiting involved releasing a pinioned duck on to a pond. The dog dived into the pond coursing the duck, which was unable to fly. A spectacular diving exhibition ensued, as the duck dived the dog dived to pursue. Inevitably, the dog could not match the duck's speed underwater and would surface in rage. Spectators would gamble and joined in the noise to encourage their animal of choice. Those who backed the dog might throw stones at the duck in an attempt to disable it, which caused fights among the spectators. The dogs would take turns catching the duck. Prizes would be awarded to the dogs that caught the duck in the least amount of time.

Strutt's Sports and Pastimes says of duck-baiting:

"another barbarous pastime and for the performance it is necessary to have recourse to a pond of water sufficiently extensive to give the duck plenty of room for making her escape from the dogs, when she is closely pursued; which she does by diving as often as any of them come near to her."

It was a favourite spectator sport for Charles II of England.

== Locations ==
Duck-baiting events were held in and around London. Rural inns, with names like "Dog and Duck, St George's Fields", located in St George's Fields, Brixton, Hampstead, Dulwich, Stamford Hill, Tottenham, Stoke-on-Trent, Newington and Tooting had ponds where the baiting took place. On the weekends, families, friends and their fighting dogs would frequent these locations.

== Decline ==
The rowdy assemblies associated with the activity caused public alarm. Duck-baiting declined in the late nineteenth century.

== See also ==
- Duck decoy (structure)
- Duck netting
- Kooikerhondje
