= Massacre of St George's Fields =

1768 massacre of protestors in South London

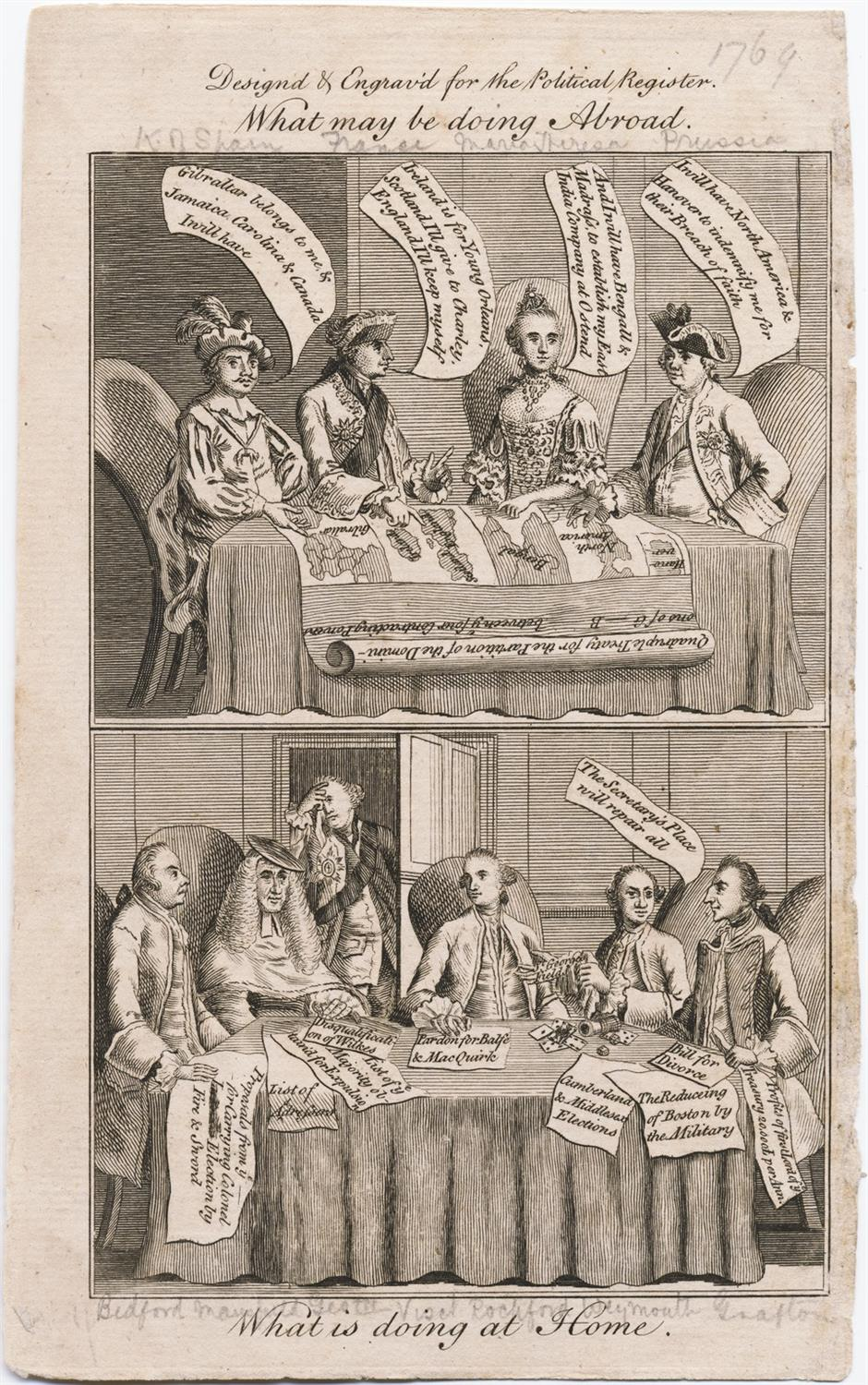
- 1769 cartoon criticising the Grafton ministry's reaction to the massacre
- Date: 10 May 1768
- Location: St George's Fields, Southwark, in South London, England; 51.4986°N 0.1010°W
- Caused by: Protest over the imprisonment of radical MP John Wilkes

Parties
Wilkes' supporters	Horse Grenadier Guards; 3rd Regiment of Foot Guards

Number
15,000	c. 200

Casualties and losses
6 or 7 killed; 15 wounded	None

The Massacre of St George's Fields occurred on 10 May 1768 when government soldiers opened fire on demonstrators that had gathered at St George's Fields, Southwark, in south London. The protest was against the imprisonment of the radical Member of Parliament John Wilkes for writing an article that severely criticised King George III. After the reading of the Riot Act telling the crowds to disperse within the hour, six or seven people were killed when fired on by troops. The incident in Britain entrenched the enduring idiom of "reading the Riot Act to someone", meaning "to reprimand severely", with the added sense of a stern warning. The phrase remains in common use in the English language.

== Background ==
In June 1762 John Wilkes started the newspaper The North Briton. After one article was published on 23 April 1763 severely attacking George III, the king and his ministers tried to prosecute Wilkes for seditious libel. However Lord Chief Justice Lord Mansfield ruled at his trial that as an MP, Wilkes was protected by parliamentary privilege so he was released without conviction.

Wilkes then proceeded to publish more material that was deemed offensive and libellous to the Crown. It was only after the House of Lords declared one of his poems to be obscene and blasphemous that moves were made to expel Wilkes from the House of Commons, but he fled to Paris before any expulsion or trial. In absentia, he was found guilty of obscene libel and seditious libel and was declared an outlaw on 19 January 1764.

Wilkes hoped for a change in power to remove the charges, but this did not come to pass. As his French creditors began to pressure him in 1768, he had little choice but to return to England. Wilkes returned intending to stand as an MP on an anti-government ticket; the government did not issue warrants for his immediate arrest as it did not want to inflame popular support.

Wilkes stood in the City of London parliamentary constituency. He came bottom of the poll of seven candidates, possibly due to his late entry into the race for the position, but he was quickly elected MP for Middlesex where most of his support was located. In April he surrendered himself to the King's Bench after waiving his parliamentary privilege to immunity. He was sentenced by Judge Joseph Yates to a year's imprisonment and fined £500, reduced to 10 months for his time already spent in prison. The Lords' sentence of outlawry was overturned. Wilkes was taken to King's Bench Prison in Southwark, south London.

== Massacre ==
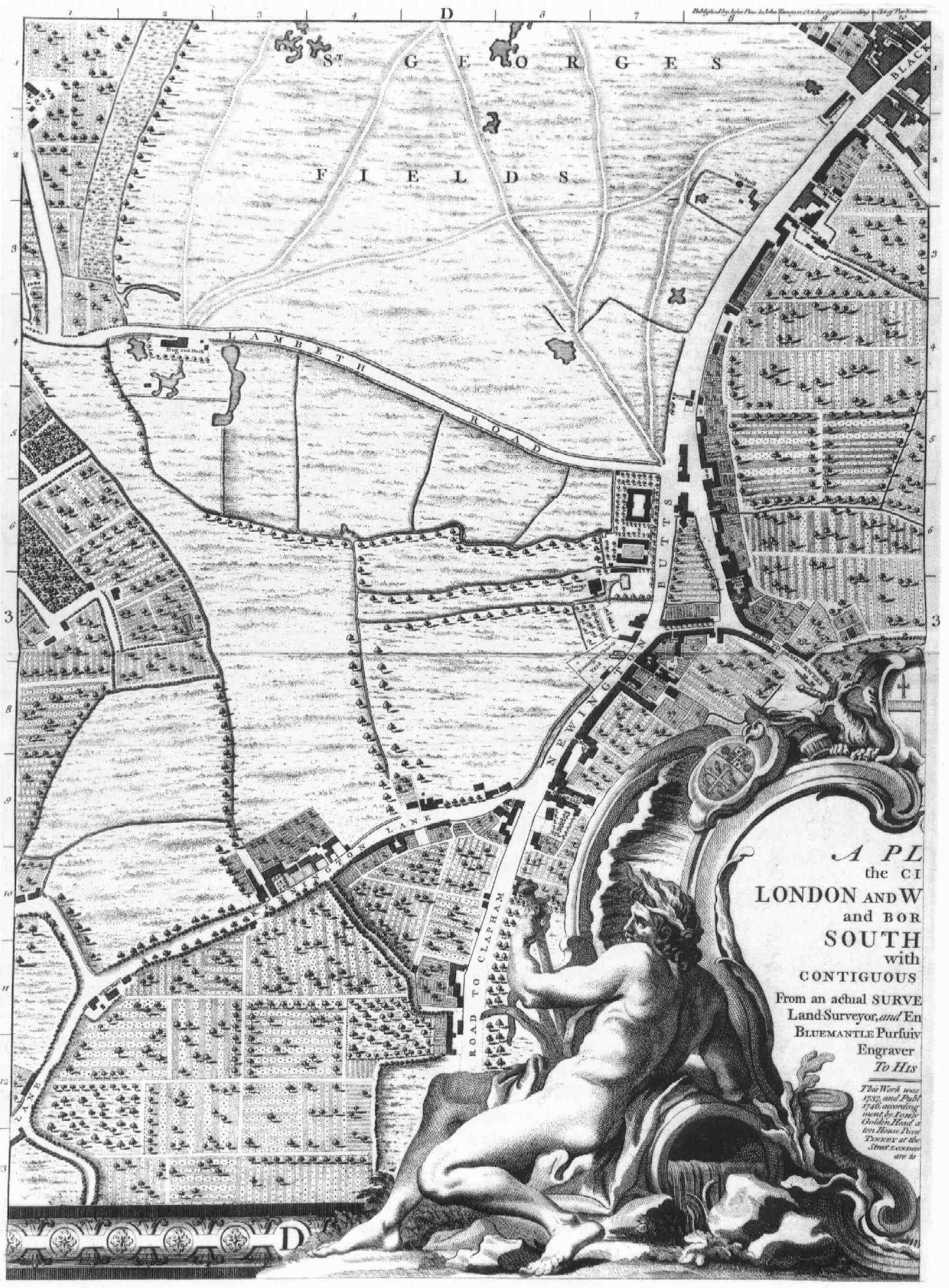
1746 map of St George's Fields, where the massacre took place

With news of his conviction and imprisonment, crowds began assembling just south of the King's Bench Prison on a large open space between Southwark and Lambeth called St George's Fields. Over the next two weeks numbers increased daily. On 10 May as many as 15,000 people had gathered at St George's Fields. They began chanting "Wilkes and Liberty", "No Liberty, No King", and "Damn the King! Damn the Government! Damn the Justices!" outside the prison.

Concerned about the intent of the crowd, four Justices of the peace from Surrey asked for military protection. A detachment of the British Army's Horse Grenadier Guards was sent to stand between the protestors and the prison. When the troops arrived, people shouted insults at the soldiers. A particularly obnoxious man wearing a red coat repeatedly goaded the troops. After some soldiers were sent to apprehend him, he was chased to a barn where one of the pursuing troops shot a person inside wearing a red coat. However the victim turned out to be an innocent young man named William Allen who worked at the farm. He was buried in St Mary's churchyard at Newington where a monument was erected to his memory.

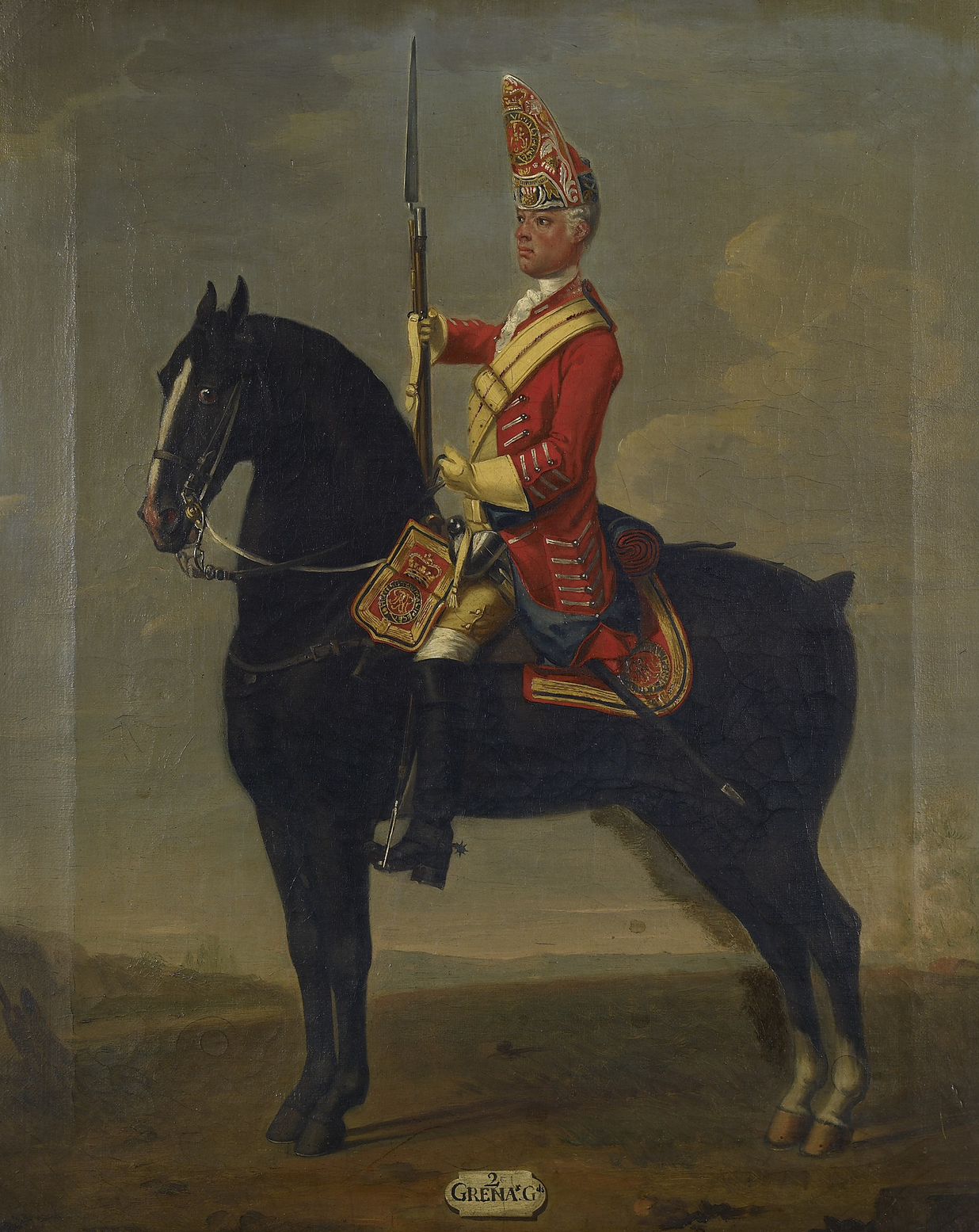
c. 1751 painting of a trooper of the Horse Grenadier Guards, which committed the massacre

The news of the death only inflamed the crowd, made worse when the JPs addressed the restless mob ordering it to disperse. Fearing that the situation was rapidly deteriorating and an attempt would be made to free Wilkes, the Riot Act was read while a call was made for reinforcements, which came from the 3rd Regiment of Foot Guards. The crowd grew restless; the soldiers were pelted with stones and they then opened fire. Some fired into the crowd but others fired over the heads. Several people were killed (as many as 11 in contemporary sources) including a passer-by who was struck by bullets that were fired over the crowd. At least fifteen people were wounded.

After the shots the crowd rapidly broke up but word of the killings swiftly spread, triggering fierce riots throughout the capital. Benjamin Franklin, who was in London at the time, reported of "sawyers destroying saw-mills; sailors unrigging all the outward bound ships [...] Watermen destroying private boats and threatening bridges." The crisis was so severe, it was rumoured that the king contemplated abdication.

== Aftermath ==
On 8 August, two soldiers were brought before a grand jury at the Surrey Assizes charged with the murder of William Allen. However neither was indicted because one escaped (or was freed) from the gaol attached to the courthouse. The grand jury also decided the other deaths were caused by "chance medley".

The Irish playwright and government supporter Hugh Kelly made a defence of the government's right to use force against Wilkes' supporters. In 1770 Wilkes' supporters started a riot at the enactment of Kelly's new play A Word to the Wise at the Drury Lane Theatre forcing the performances to cease.

On his release from prison in March 1770, Wilkes was appointed a sheriff of the City of London. In 1774 he became Lord Mayor of London.

== See also ==
- List of massacres in the United Kingdom
- Boston Massacre, two years later
