= Dog and Duck, St George's Fields =

17th century London tavern

Dog and Duck
- The Dog and Duck painted by Thomas H. Shepherd in the 19th century, based on a 1646 drawing. Shepherd specialised in painting old London buildings before they were demolished.
- Interactive map of the Dog and Duck area

General information
- Status: Demolished
- Location: St George's Fields
- Coordinates: 51°29′44″N 0°6′31″W
- Construction started: 1642 or earlier
- Demolished: 1812

The Dog and Duck was a tavern built upon St George's Fields in London in the 17th century. It was named after the sport of duck-baiting, that took place in adjacent wetland. In the 18th century its gardens were used as a spa but, by the 1770s, with spas no longer fashionable, it declined into a rowdy location for concerts. The magistrates refused to renew its licence, despite protracted legal disputes, and it closed in 1799. The building was then used as a School for the Indigent Blind and demolished in 1812, when the new Bethlem Hospital was built upon the site. That building is now used by the Imperial War Museum.

== Duck-baiting ==
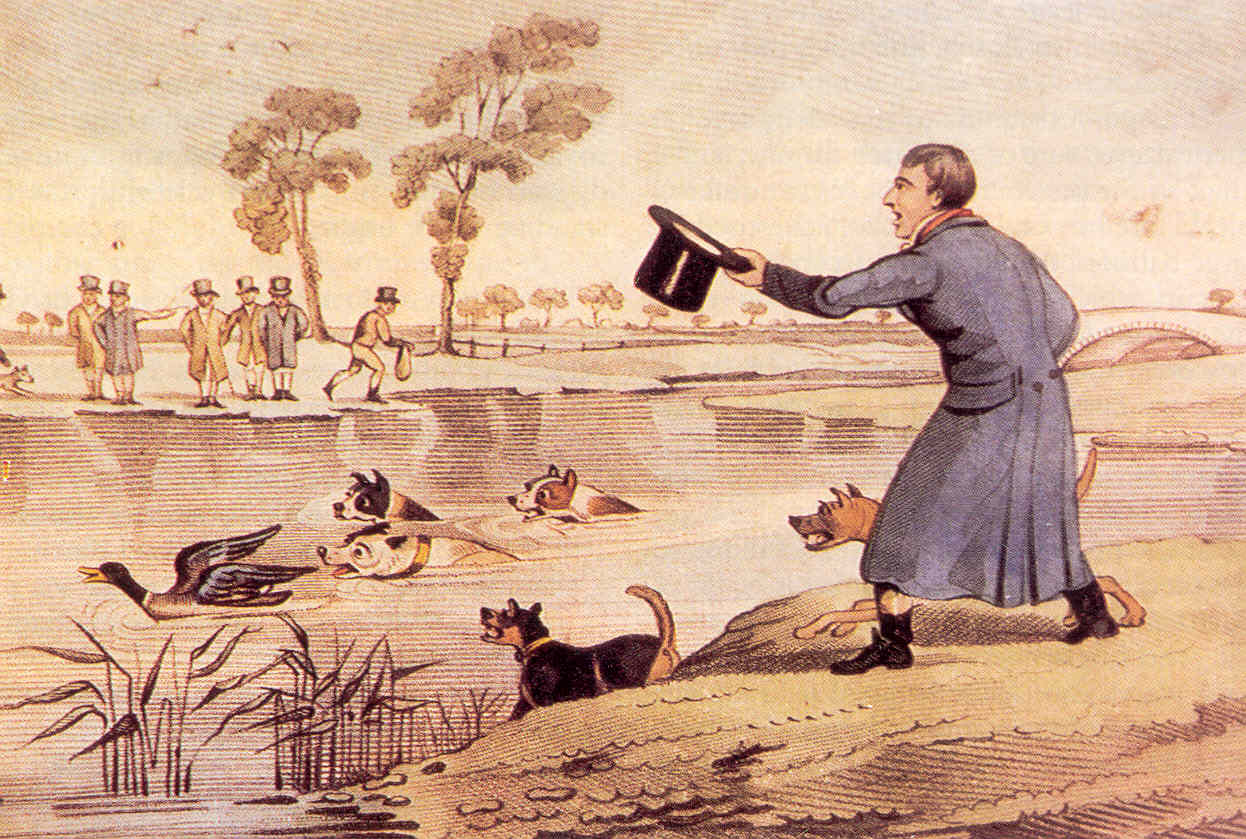
The sport of duck-baiting

The sport of duck baiting was commonplace in England and taverns sprang up nearby to provide refreshment. Fritz Endell wrote, "Another not less cruel sport still lives in the tavern sign 'Dog and Duck.' The birds were put into a small pond and chased by dogs. Watching the frightened creatures dive to escape their pursuers constituted the chief joy of the performance."

== The tavern ==
Illustration of the stone inn sign, dated 1716

In its St George's Fields location, the tavern was known to have existed in 1642. It was adjacent to a marshy area of ponds draining into the Neckinger brook, where the duck-baiting took place. The inn sign, dated 1716, (Note: Walford states 1617 but the images in Harper and Lyons both show 1716.) was an oblong red moulding in stone composition showing a dog with a duck in its mouth. The left of the sign showed the badge of Bridge House Estates, the landowner. At its peak it was a very popular tavern and was marked on John Rocque's 1741–45 map and 1746 map of London.

By 1695 the area was famous for its waters and so a spa was set up. When this ceased to attract business it was abandoned but other entertainments were promoted, such as an organ and skittles. David Garrick, in his prologue to the 1774 play The Maid of the Oaks, alluded to the decline –

"St. George's Fields, with taste of fashion struck,
Display Arcadia at the 'Dog and Duck';
And Drury misses here, in tawdry pride,
Are there 'Pastoras' by the fountain side;
To frowsy bowers they reel through midnight damps,
With Fawns half drunk, and Dryads breaking lamps."

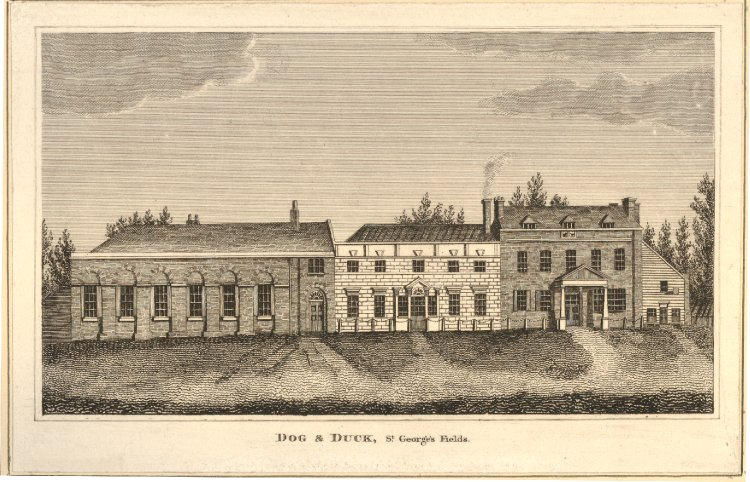
Etching of Dog and Duck in 1772

According to Edward Walford, the tavern gardens were used for popular concerts with an audience of "the riff-raff and scum of the town", which became a public nuisance. The place gained a reputation for vice, being described as "a house in which gangs of both whores and rogues were constantly associated". Highwaymen would carouse there before setting out on their depredations. Francis Place reported that, as a boy, he had seen "two or three horses at the door of the Dog and Duck in St George's Fields on a summer evening, and people waiting to see the Highwaymen mount ... flashy women come out to take leave of the thieves at dusk and wish them success".

In 1787, renewal of the licence was therefore refused by the Surrey magistrates following a proclamation from George III against drunkenness. They decided "too many people assembled there of very loose character, and that it consequently became a receptacle for disorderly persons, and a place of assignation destructive of that morality which it was the duty of the law to see preserved". However, the landlord applied to the City of London magistrates, who granted a licence despite its being a house "so notorious as a resort for amusement and debauch". This led to a legal dispute between the magistrates, which was decided in 1792 against the City magistrates. The tavern finally lost its licence in 1799. The inn sign is now in the collection of the Cuming Museum on Walworth Road.

Times 1788 editorial regarding the renewal of the tavern's licence

This pleasantly situated stop has been improved at a very enormous expense by its present Proprietor, who has laid out the Gardens with peculiar neatness, and refreshed them by a large canal. Here it was thought the youth of both sexes met too numerous, and too often for the benefit of their morals, and a strong party was formed to annihilate the place. But the general idea of sensible men was, that the Proclamation only gave an opportunity for the long pent-up malice of a certain junto in that parish, who envied industry its long earned reward, to busy forth on this man's head, and at once crush all his hopes of providing handsomely for his family. This is one measure they effected by shutting up his doors on a Sunday evening, and preventing him the liberty that every other victualler enjoyed of selling tea, wine, etc as if his house and Gardens were more offensive to morality than those of other people. It certainly was true that the beauties of the place, the variety of the company, and the gaiety of the music, drew together a vast concourse of people, but there was neither a private room to commit fornication, nor late hours to induce inebriety. The only complaint, in truth, was that the music invited, the company charmed, and that, as is ever the case in all places of public amusement, girls of the town crowded there.

— The Times (30 August 1788)

== St George's Spaw ==
The Dog and Duck and St George's Spaw are shown on John Rocque's map of London in 1769. They are the cluster of ponds and buildings on the SW edge of St George's Fields, south of the asylum.

Spas became fashionable in the early 18th century and the gardens of the Dog and Duck, under the name St George's Spaw, started selling Purging Waters at 6d a gallon. As a spa it became very popular and was patronised by the gentry. A 1732 advertisement claimed that the "great success which these waters have had in the Cure of Investigative Cancers have rendered them truly famous throughout the Kingdoms" with "many happy instances of the Truth of this daily to be seen". Within the tavern itself the waters were also used for cold bathing.

In 1771, Dr Johnson corresponded with his friend Mrs Thrale about the waters, "You despise the Dog and Duck; things that are at hand are always slighted. I remember that Dr. Grevil, of Gloucester, sent for that water when his wife was in the same danger; but he lived near Malvern and you live near the Dog and Duck. Thus, in difficult cases, we naturally trust most what we least know." By 1773 the waters had reached "their utmost perfection" and at the tavern, comfortingly, there were "Tea, coffee and hot rolls as usual".

== Hedger family ==
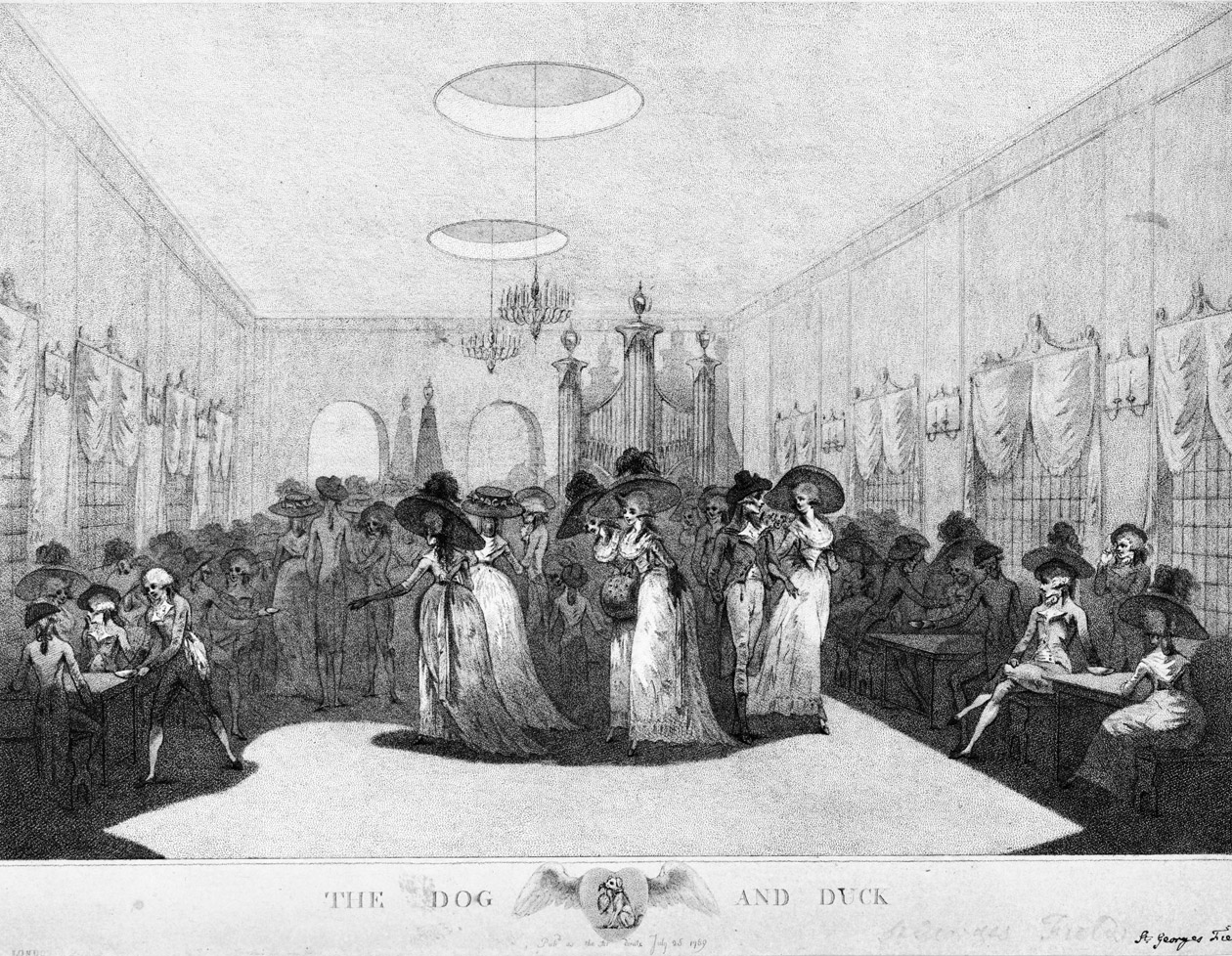
Interior of the Long Room of the Dog and Duck, probably 1789

Mrs Elizabeth Hedger, who had been a barmaid, was granted a lease on the tavern and its gardens in 1773, and three years later her son James was promised the lease of all the Bridge House Estate land at St George's Fields on condition that the Dog and Duck itself was repaired. In fact they extended the building with leaded domes, a music gallery and, outside, a bowling green. As the spa lost trade they concentrated more and more on amusements and attractions, which led to the place developing a poor reputation with the authorities. With the lease formally established in 1785 they became very wealthy and started speculative building in the grounds.

By 1802 James Hedger had become known as the "King of St. George's Fields". With James's son, also called James, they built on common land and the Court of Common Council took legal advice towards prosecution. However, since the common ground was for the benefit of the land tenants of the estate and the Hedgers by then had a controlling interest in the land, the matter was dropped. After the tavern had been demolished the Hedgers continued to build houses on the land although this required paying a forfeit for breach of covenant. The properties were of very poor quality and the land had not been drained so the landlord, the City of London, decided the lease would not be renewed. When the lease finally expired, Hedger started demolishing the buildings to reuse the materials elsewhere and in March 1810 a crowd of about one thousand "of the lowest orders" gathered to join in the demolition and remove building materials. Hedger did not intervene because he was required to return the common land in its original condition and he was being saved clearance costs. Some houses were still occupied and the inhabitants lost their belongings and had to flee for their lives.

== Subsequent use ==
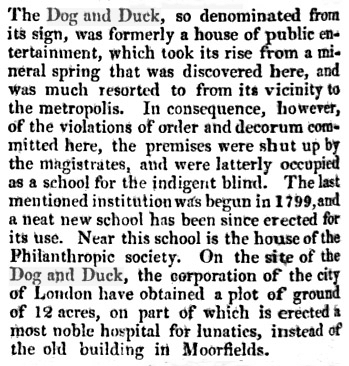
Description in Edinburgh Gazetteer, 1822

When the tavern licence was not renewed the building was used as a temporary home for Thomas Boddington's School for the Indigent Blind. In 1800 fifteen pupils were housed and instructed in the Long Room. A year or so later the school, with thirty-five male and seventeen female pupils, expanded into the tavern and its gardens. The building was demolished in 1812 to make way for the Bethlem Hospital – a new location for the famous "Bedlam" – and the old stone inn sign was built into the wall of the hospital garden. The site is now used by the Imperial War Museum within Geraldine Mary Harmsworth Park.

== See also ==
- Pub names
