= Samuel Boddington =

British politician (1766–1843)

Samuel Boddington (19 June 1766 – 19 April 1843) was a British politician. He was a Member of Parliament (MP) for Tralee from January 1807 to May of the same year.

He was baptised 7 July 1766 at the Baker Street Meeting House (Presbyterian) in Enfield, London, the son of Benjamin and Sarah Boddington. The Boddington family held large estates in the West Indies and Samuel was left a fortune by his father who had been a director of the South Sea Company as well as a West India merchant with offices at Mark Lane.

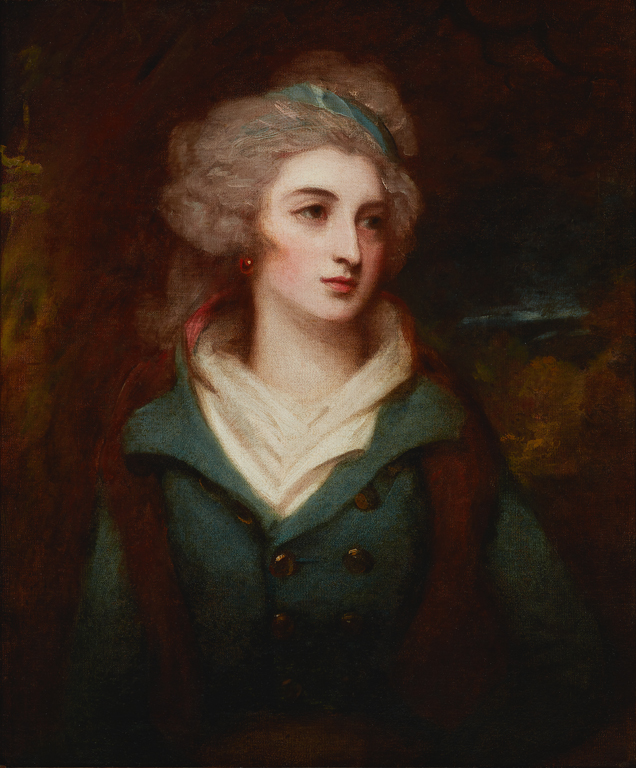
Miss Grace Ashburner (1774–1812), 1792, painted by George Romney

In 1792 Samuel fell in love with Grace Ashburner, the daughter of William Ashburner, was in charge of the East India Company's factory in Tellicherry before he moved to the same position in Bombay. The couple married the same year. But Grace soon tired of her husband's quiet intellectual interests (Henry Fox rather unkindly referred to Samuel Boddington as "the arch-bore old Bod.") and in 1797 she eloped with his cousin Benjamin Boddington who had recently joined the family firm. After a court case which awarded £10,000 to Samuel, the couple divorced and Grace married Benjamin in 1798.

Thereafter, Samuel approached his friend, Richard Sharp (politician), a fellow Dissenter, fellow member of the Fishmongers' Company, and both mutual friends of Samuel Rogers, asking if he would join him in business, and eventually a West India company of Boddington, Sharp and Philips (Sir George Philips, 1st Baronet) was established at 17 Mark Lane. Both Boddington and Philips (later Sir George Philips) followed Sharp's example and became dissenting Whig members of Parliament.

He died on 19 April 1843, aged 76, and was buried at St Andrew's Enfield.

Parliament of the United Kingdom
Preceded by Maurice Fitzgerald	Member of Parliament for Tralee; 1807	Succeeded by Sir Arthur Wellesley (later Duke of Wellington)
