= Duck netting =

Japanese aristocratic sport involving catching ducks

Characteristics
- Contact: No
- Type: Outdoor
- Equipment: Net, Duck

Presence
- Olympic: No

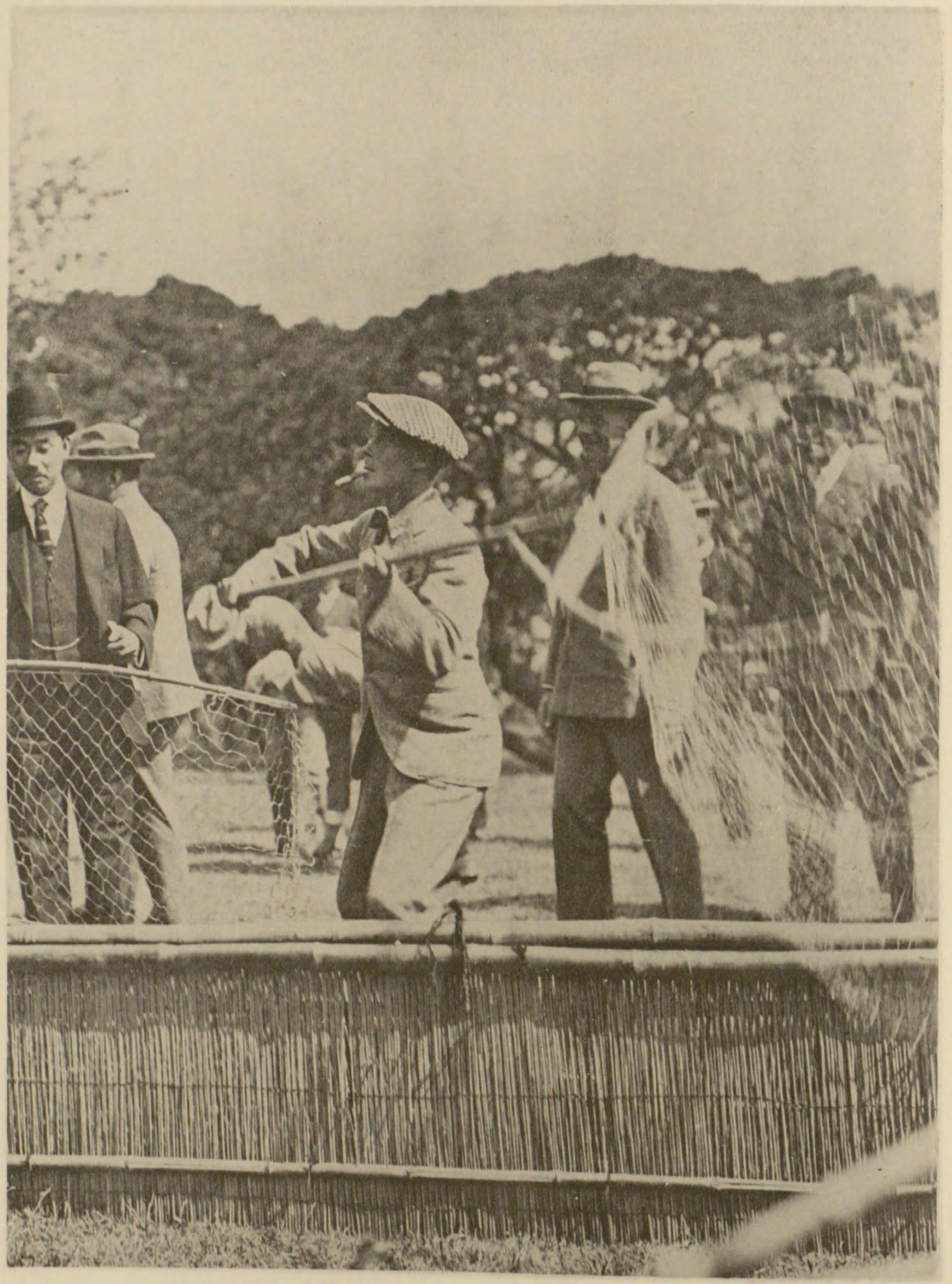
The future Edward VIII netting ducks at Hamarikyu Gardens in Tokyo in 1922

Duck netting is a non-competitive sport that, in modern times, is generally limited to play by the members of the Imperial House of Japan and their guests. It is believed to be peculiar to Japan in general, and to the Imperial Household specifically. Duck netting is managed by the Board of Ceremonies of the Imperial Household Agency. Mastery of the sport, which involves swinging a large net to ensnare a startled duck, is not considered difficult.

== History ==
Duck netting may have originated during the Tokugawa shogunate, when noble families in Japan owned private duck ponds. However, another source claims that duck netting is at least 1,200 years old. The social place of duck netting in Japan has been compared to that of fox hunting in Britain. In modern times, it is believed to be peculiar to Japan generally, and to the Imperial Household specifically. The sport of duck netting is organized by the Grand Master of Ceremonies in his role as head of the Board of Ceremonies of the Imperial Household Agency.

Notable state guests of the Japanese Imperial Household who have participated in duck netting include Haile Selassie, Sujan R. Chinoy, John D. Rockefeller III, and Charles, Prince of Wales.

There are two Imperial Wild Duck Preserves or kamoba (鴨場) in Japan, at Saitama near Koshigaya, and at Shinhama near Ichikawa. In the past, duck netting has been conducted at a kamoba in the Hamarikyu Gardens in Tokyo.

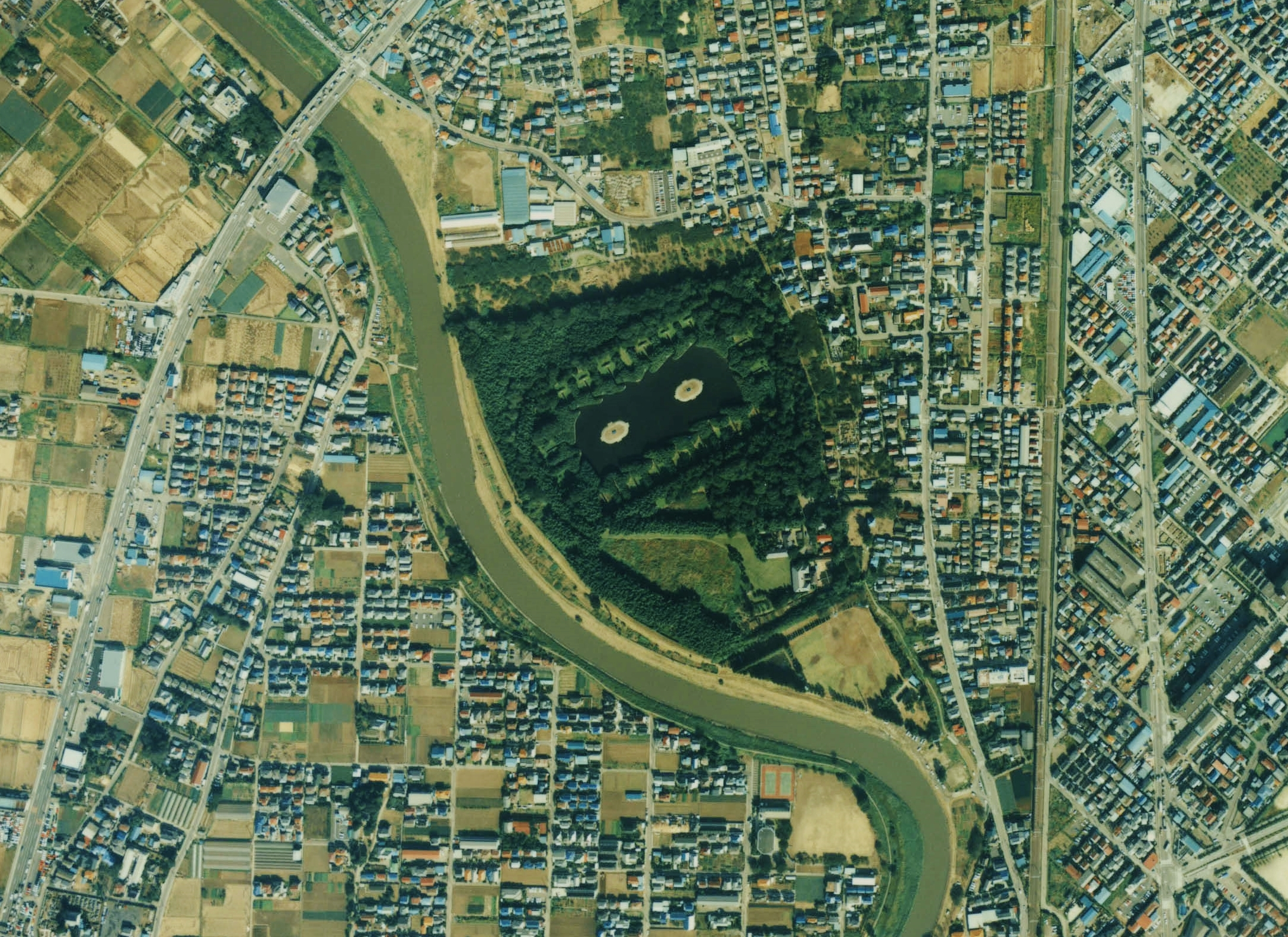
Saitama Imperial Wild Duck Preserve, aerial photograph, 1989

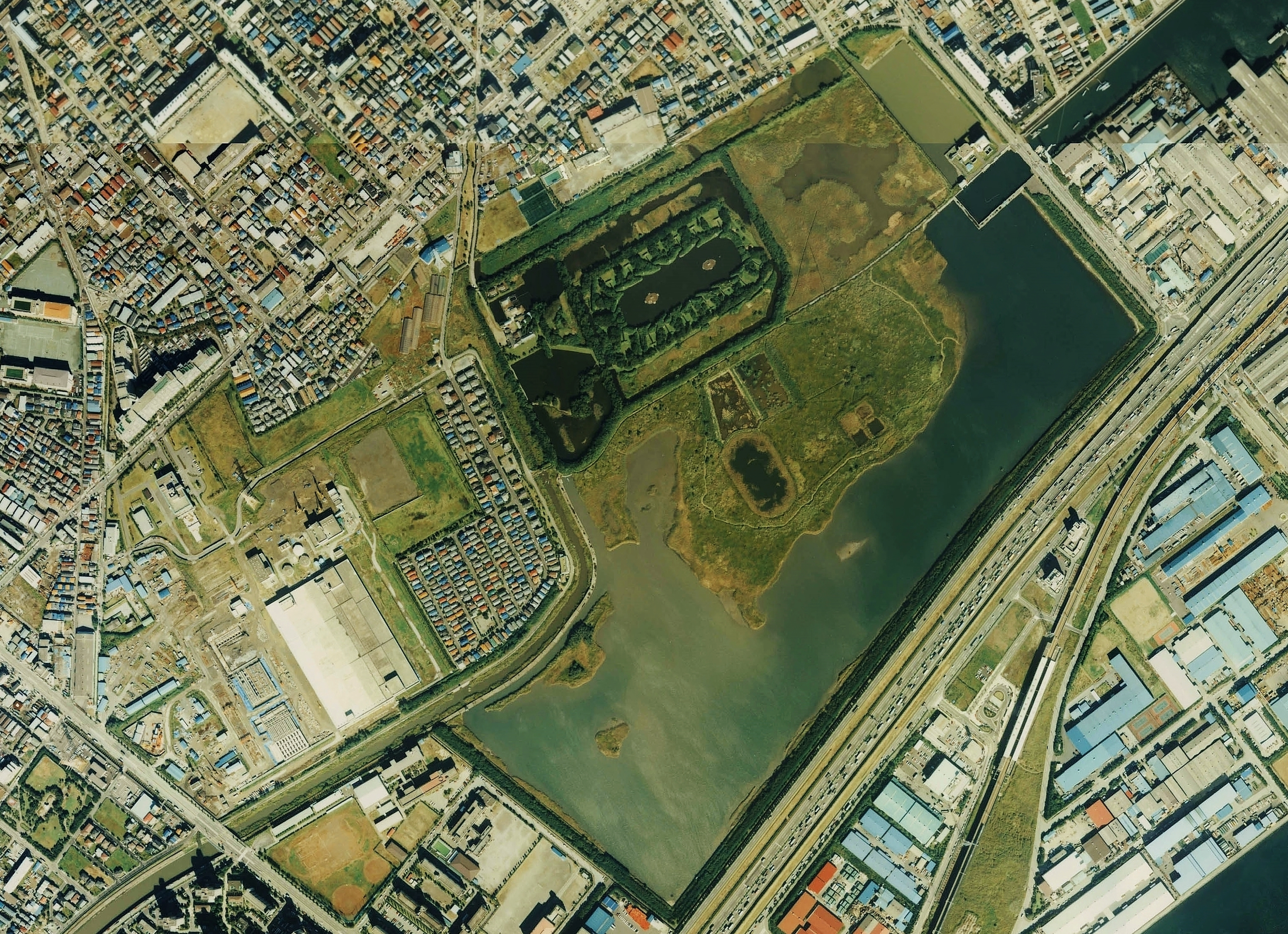
Shinhama Imperial Wild Duck Preserve, aerial photograph, 1989

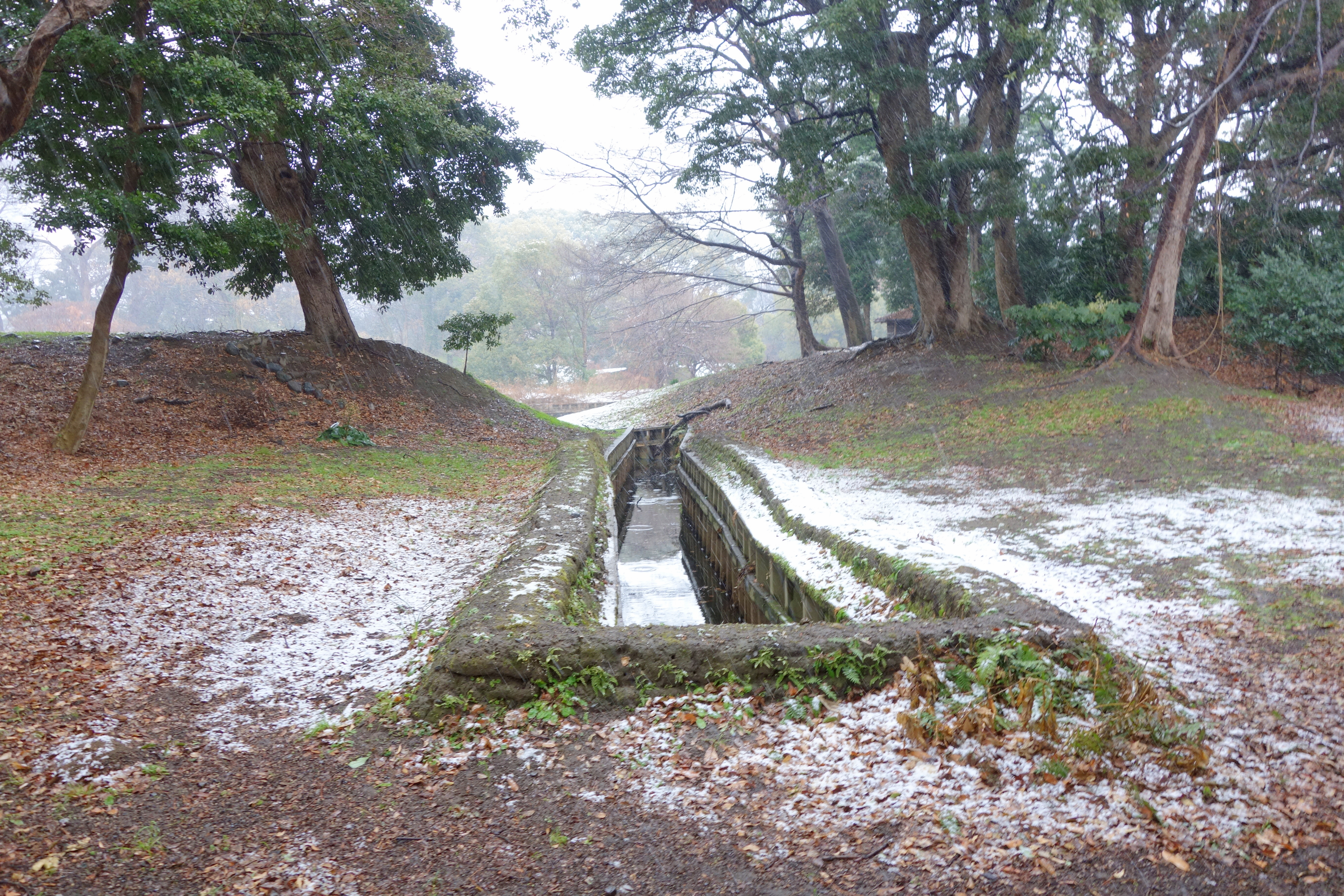
Duck hunting ground (kamoba) in the Hamarikyu Gardens, Tokyo

== Rules ==
Tame ducks are used to entice wild ducks into an artificial canal from the lake in which they live; upon entering the canal, a screen is dropped across the passage, preventing the wild ducks from returning to the lake. The wild ducks, startled at their sudden entrapment, attempt to fly into the air. The human sportsmen, who have remained hidden behind earthen mounds to either side of the canal, then spring into action with long-handled nets and attempt to net one of the escaping ducks.

At the conclusion of the contest, the ducks are released. However, in earlier versions of the sport, the ducks would be eaten.

Duck netting is not considered particularly difficult as ducks tend to be slow when taking to the air.

== See also ==
- Duck-baiting
- Duck decoy (structure)
- Waterfowl hunting
