= Charles Albert Ashburner =

American geologist

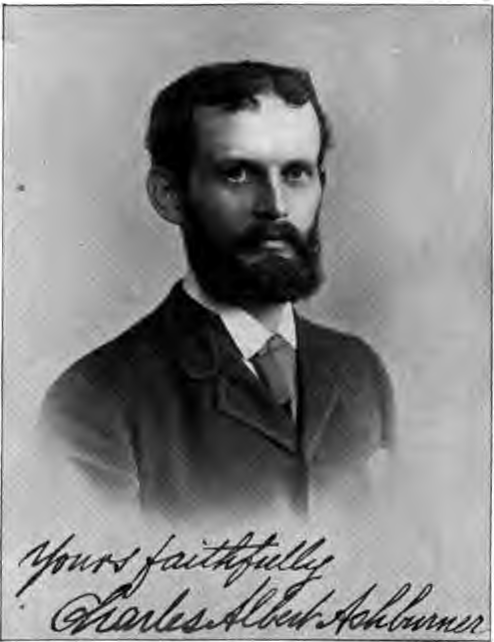
- Born: February 9, 1854; Philadelphia, United States
- Died: December 24, 1889 (aged 35); Pittsburgh
- Occupation: Geologist, mining engineer

Charles Albert Ashburner (February 9, 1854 – December 24, 1889) was an American geologist.

== Formative years ==
Charles Albert Ashburner was born on February 9, 1854, in Philadelphia. He graduated from the University of Pennsylvania in 1874. During the summer of 1872 he was engaged on the survey of the Delaware River.

== Career ==
Following his graduation from the University of Pennsylvania, Ashburner accepted a position with the lighthouse survey service. In 1874, the geological survey of Pennsylvania was reorganized with the appointment of Professor J. P. Lesley as state geologist; Ashburner subsequently resigned from the service to become an assistant on the survey.

Ashburner was employed during the latter part of 1874 in the surveys of Mifflin and Juniata counties. In 1875, he was appointed assistant geologist, and placed in charge of the surveys in McKean, Elk, Forest, and Cameron counties.

In 1880, he was appointed geologist in charge of the survey of the anthracite coal fields, where he originated a method for surveying and representing the geology of a large coalbed. In 1885, he was appointed as the geologist in charge of all of the office and field work of the survey.

Ashburner was a member of the American Philosophical Society, the American Institute of Mining Engineers, and other scientific societies. He also contributed to scientific and technical journals, and prepared more than twenty of the reports of the geological survey. In 1889, he was awarded a Doctor of Science degree.

== Death ==
Ashburner died on December 24, 1889, in Pittsburgh.
