= Ashburner =

Ashburner is a surname, and may refer to:

- Charles Albert Ashburner (1854–1889), American geologist
- Lesley Ashburner (1883–1950), American athlete
- Lionel Robert Ashburner (1827–1907), American colonial administrator
- Michael Ashburner (1942–2023), English biologist
- Walter Ashburner (1864–1936), American-born British classical and legal scholar

== See also ==
- Ashburner family
