= Geraldine Mary Harmsworth Park =

Park in the London Borough of Southwark, England

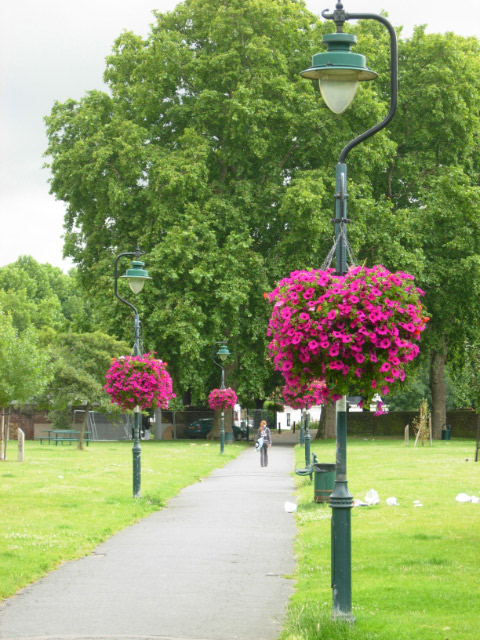
- Geraldine Mary Harmsworth Park, July 2007.

- Location within London Borough of Southwark
- Type: Public
- Location: Lambeth Road, London, SE1
- Coordinates: 51°29′46.23″N 0°6′35.59″W

Geraldine Mary Harmsworth Park is a public park in Kennington, South London. Maintained by the London Borough of Southwark, it is bounded by Lambeth Road, Kennington Road, St George's Road and Brook Drive. It covers an area of 5.9 hectares (15 acres). The grounds of the park surround its central feature, the Imperial War Museum London.

== History ==
The park was opened in 1934 after the land was gifted to the 'splendid struggling mothers of Southwark' by Harold Harmsworth, 1st Viscount Rothermere. The park was named in remembrance of Rothermere's mother, Geraldine Mary Harmsworth. The land had previously been the grounds of the Dog and Duck tavern and later the Bethlem Hospital, after which the freehold was purchased by Rothermere following the relocation of the hospital to Surrey. The hospital building, constructed between 1812 and 1814, was largely demolished, with the remaining central portion being leased to the government's First Commissioner of Works to accommodate the Imperial War Museum.

The park received its first Green Flag Award in 2012. The award was renewed in 2013.

== Sports facilities ==
The park's sports facilities include five-a-side football pitches, and netball, basketball and tennis courts. The provision of these facilities was supported by a £1.4 million grant from the Big Lottery Fund.

== Memorials ==
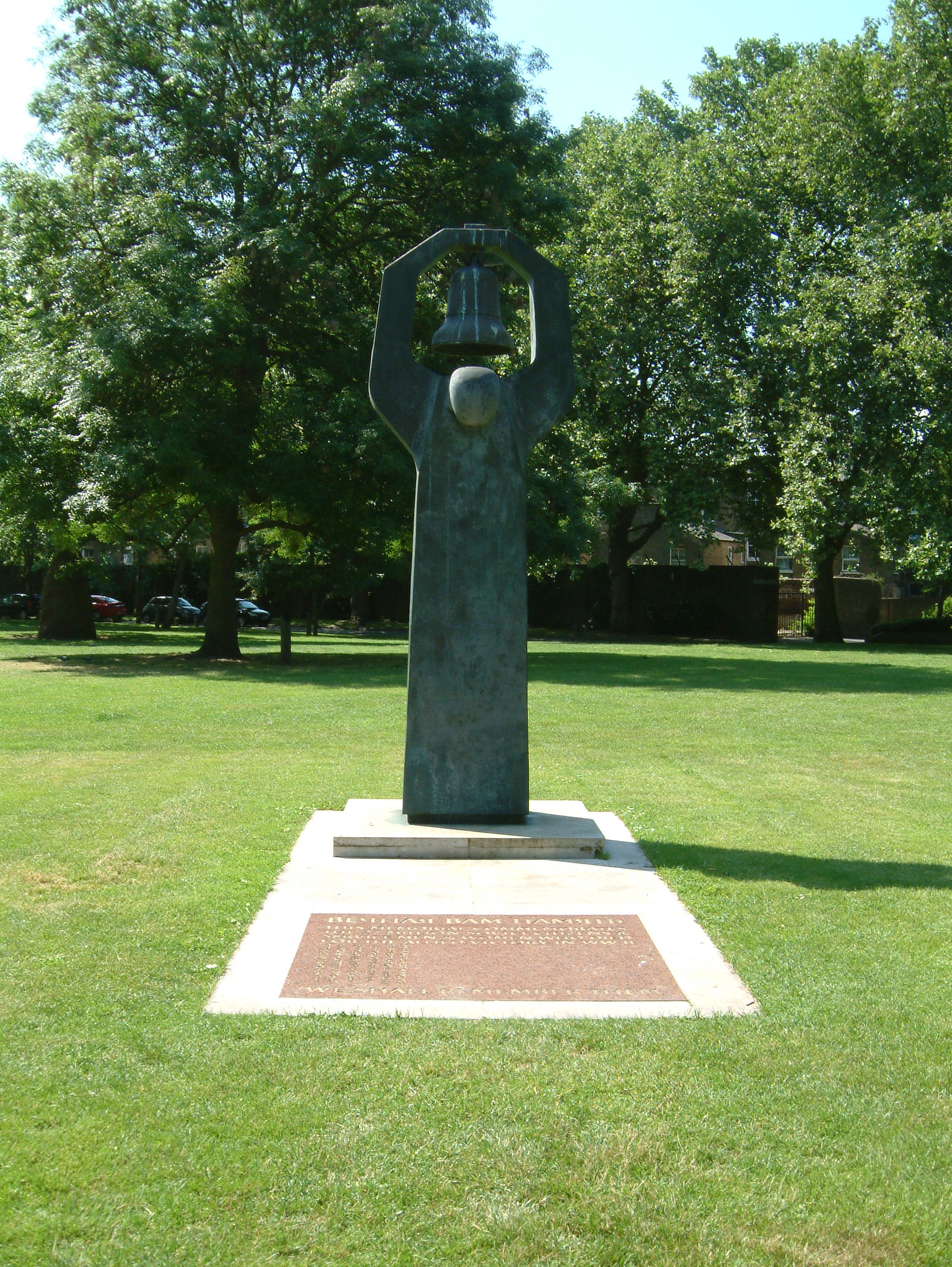
Soviet War Memorial

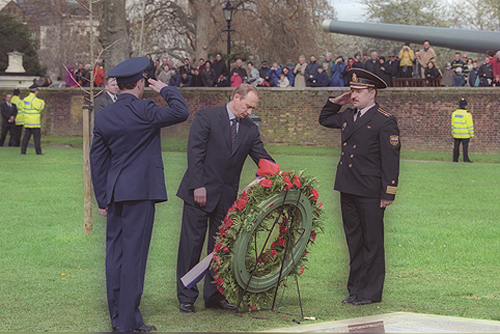
Vladimir Putin at the memorial in April 2000.

On 9 May 1999 a Soviet War Memorial was unveiled by the Secretary of State for Defence George Robertson, and the Russian ambassador Yuri Fokine. The date of the unveiling was significant as 9 May is marked as Victory Day in Russia. Since its inauguration the memorial has been the site of commemorations of Victory Day, Holocaust Memorial Day and Remembrance Sunday.

Also in May 1999 the Dalai Lama opened a Tibetan Peace Garden, commissioned by the Tibet Foundation, in the park. The garden features a bronze cast of the Kalachakra Mandala, contemporary western sculpture, and a pillar inscribed with a message from the Dalai Lama in English, Tibetan, Hindi and Chinese.

On 30 October 2004, two Araucaria araucana ('monkey puzzle') trees were planted near the park's eastern gates in memory of two Chileans who were forcibly 'disappeared' in 1974 following a military coup in Chile. The plantings were part of the Chilean Human Rights International Project's 'Ecomemoria' campaign.
