= St George's Fields =

Former area of Southwark in South London, England

Coordinates: 51°29′55″N 0°6′18″W

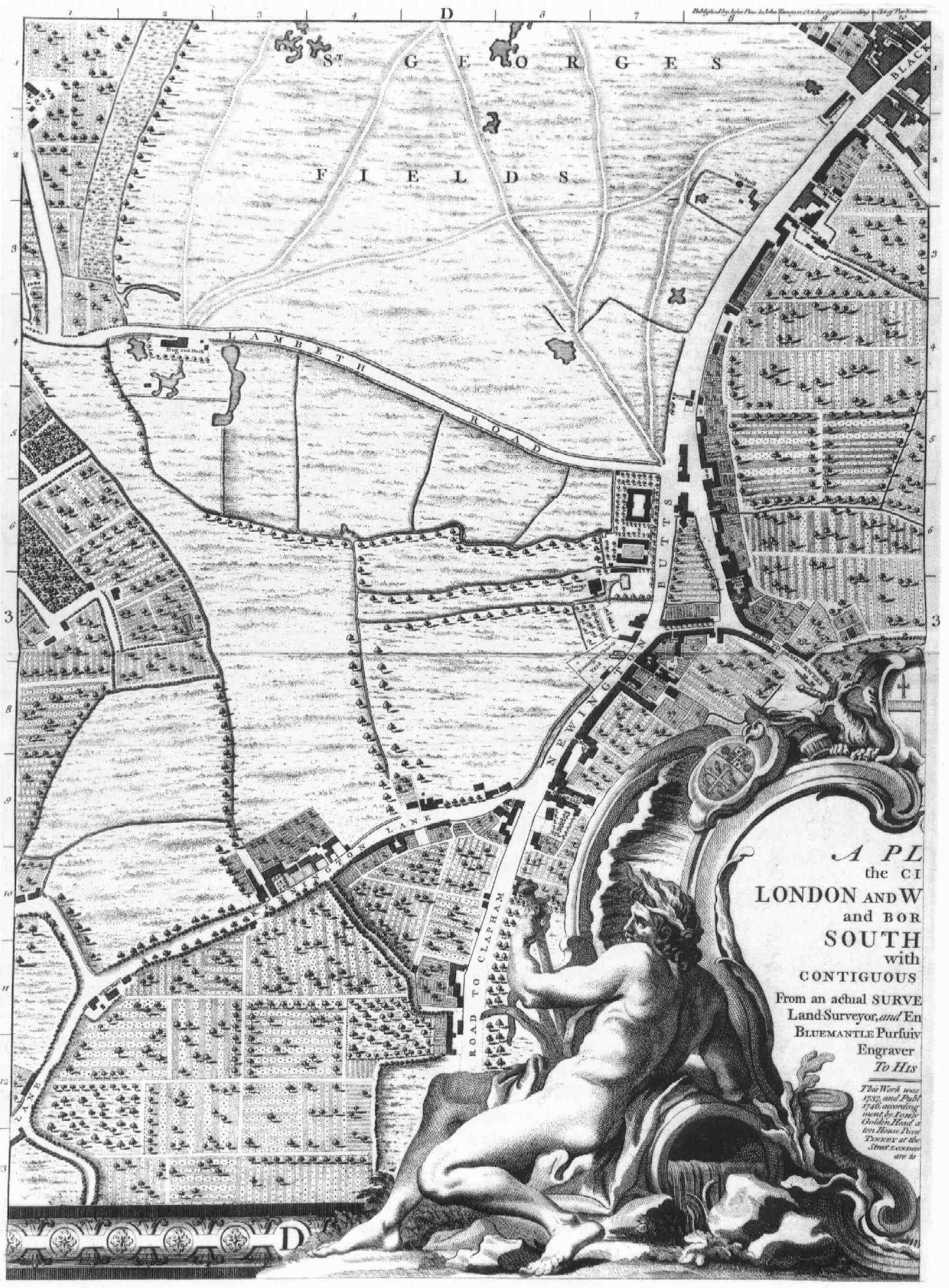
Roque 1746 London d3

St George's Fields was an area of Southwark in South London, England.

== History ==
Originally the area was an undifferentiated part of the south side of the Thames, which was low-lying marshland unsuitable even for agricultural purposes. There is evidence of Roman occupation. As at Lambeth Marsh, the settlement was built on raised through roads over the marsh lands. These were likely summer residences, for in winter the land was under water. A monastery is known to have existed at Bermondsey before 715 AD. Bermondsey is likely to have been a higher, drier spot in an otherwise marshy area.

The area was part of the king's demesne. In 1082, according to the "Annales Monasterii de Bermundeseia", Alwinus Child obtained a royal license to found a monastery dedicated to St Saviour, most likely on the site of the earlier one. In 1086, the monastery became part of the Cluniac network under the Priory of St Mary's of La Charité-sur-Loire. Bermondsey Priory later acquired additional properties neighbouring their home manor.

The area takes its name from the nearby Church of St George the Martyr, which according to the Annals of Bermondsey Abbey was founded by Thomas Ardern and Thomas his son in 1122. The small de Ardern family property occupied the corner of the junction of the high street and "old" Kent street (now Tabard Street); presumably this had been acquired from Canterbury after 1086. It may have been a hamlet that had developed at what is the junction of the Roman roads now known as Stane Street and Watling Street. This too was given to Bermondsey Priory in 1122 by the Arderns along with the church of St George the Martyr which is in that precinct. The Rectors were appointed by the Priory/Abbey until the Reformation changes and its dissolution.

== Suffolk Place ==
In 1479 William Brandon was appointed Knight Marshal of the Marshalsea Court, and therefore, of Marshalsea prison. The Brandons also came to control the King's Bench Prison. Prisons, at that time, were run as private concerns for profit, as a sort of forced lodging for debtors and those awaiting trial. As they became more prominent at court the Brandons grew wealthier and acquired from the Abbey parts of the western side of the high street to create a large mansion. and grounds including, notably, Moulton Close, which is now Geraldine Mary Harmsworth Park around the Imperial War Museum. The house became known as Brandon Place.

Charles Brandon, the last of the male line, became Earl Marshal in 1510 and was created Duke of Suffolk in 1514; he married Henry VIII's sister in 1516. The mansion then became known as Suffolk Place. In 1536 Charles gave Suffolk Place, rebuilt by him in fine Renaissance style in 1522, to King Henry VIII in exchange for Norwich Palace on the Strand. Shortly after, in June 1536, Bermondsey Abbey was induced to "grant" its land to the king as part of the Dissolution of the Monasteries: hence he now owned all of the Abbey’s manor west of the high street. Henry VIII gave this building to Queen Jane Seymour in 1537. It appears that it was the king's intention to create a new royal hunting park and the Brandon mansion was to serve as its lodge. However, he seems to have lost interest in the project after the Queen died of post-natal complications shortly after the birth of Edward VI.

== Property of the City ==
The manor belonged to the Crown for only fourteen years, as in 1550 the City acquired it from Edward VI's government and also the Canterbury manor on the east side of the high street. The Abbot's manor became known as "The King's Manor". This was presumably because of the royal presence at the old Suffolk House. This had been specifically excluded from the City’s jurisdiction by clauses in the 1550 charter. The building remained a royal mansion; in 1554 Queen Mary stayed overnight with her new husband King Philip II of Spain as part of their progress to London. The City's jurisdiction in Southwark now stretched across from the various borders with Lambeth and Bermondsey. These lands were paid for through the use of the endowments of the Bridge House Estates. From this point the City nominated the Rector of St George's, as to the present day.

The area having been over the course of time drained, St George's Fields, comprised broad open meadows. By the reign of Charles I it was a popular meeting place for mobs, and in May 1640 a large armed mob attacked Lambeth Palace in the hope of capturing the unpopular Archbishop, William Laud. At the restoration, during Charles II's progress from Dover to London, the Lord Mayor and Aldermen feted the king under a large tent erected in St George's Fields, where on 29 of May 1660, a great banquet was held prior to the king's entering the City. According to Samuel Pepys and John Evelyn, six years later, St George's Fields were one of the places of refuge to which the poorer citizens retreated with such of their goods and chattels as they could save from the Great Fire of London. It also became a place much favoured by open-air preachers, who were not allowed to hold forth in London.

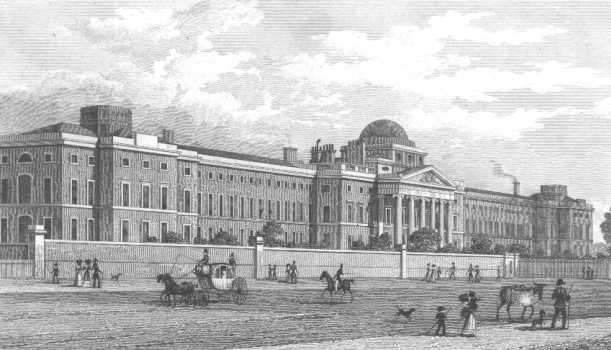
Bethlem Hospital in St George's Fields by Thomas Shepherd (c.1830)

The City's control of the area of St George's Fields allowed its development. From 1750 the creation of the new roads associated with the new Westminster Bridge and the improvements to the old London Bridge created the traffic nexus at Newington which because of these changes became known as Elephant and Castle, and the junction of St George's Circus was required to connect these with the 1769 Blackfriars Bridge Road / London Road. The City also decided to relocate the Bethlem Royal Hospital from Moorfields in 1815. The location at the edge of the territory it had control of in St George's Fields, the site of the Dog and Duck tavern, was thought at the time to be sufficiently rural for the institution but also convenient to the built up area.

St George's Fields was the scene of riots in 1768, agitating for the release of John Wilkes and, more seriously, was the starting point of the Gordon Riots in 1780 which began in the movement to repeal the act of parliament removing penalties for Catholics.

== The obelisk at St George's Circus ==
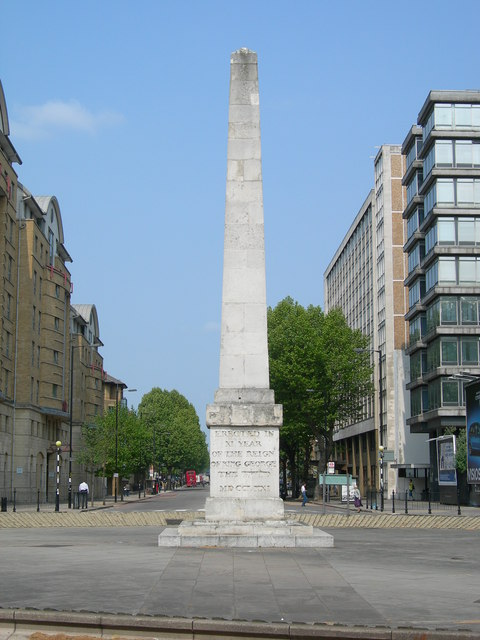
Obelisk at St George's Circus

The obelisk at St George's Circus was built in 1771 in honour of Brass Crosby, the Lord Mayor of the City of London. It was moved to the north apex of Geraldine Mary Harmsworth Park, (the remnant of Moulton Close) a short distance to the southwest, in front of the museum, in 1905, and put back in its original spot in the late 1990s.

The obelisk was mentioned in the novel David Copperfield by Charles Dickens:

there was a long-legged young man with a very little empty donkey-art, standing near the Obelisk, in the Blackfriars Road, whose eye I caught as I was going by, and who, addressing me as 'Sixpenn'orth of bad ha'pence,' hoped 'I should know him agin to swear to' — in allusion, I have no doubt, to my staring at him. I stopped to assure him that had not done so in a bad manner, but uncertain whether he might or might not like a job.

== St George's Cathedral, Southwark ==
Although there had been a Catholic chapel at London Road a new and much larger church was required for an increasing local population. As the area is known as St George's Fields and the site of the new church was on St George's Road its dedication to England's Patron Saint was suggested immediately. It was designed by Augustus Pugin, who married there, being considered the most important Catholic church in England when it was built. It could seat about 3,000 persons, and the building was 240 feet long by 72 feet wide. The church was solemnly opened by Bishop Wiseman on 4 July 1848. To mark the occasion Pope Pius IX sent a golden chalice and paten as a gift. Two years later Pope Pius IX restored the English hierarchy and St George's was chosen as the diocesan church of St George's Cathedral, Southwark, of the new Archdiocese of Southwark, which was to cover the whole of southern England. For the next half-century, until the opening of Westminster Cathedral, St George's was the centre of Catholic life in London. As a cathedral it actually predates by more than half a century that of the Anglican Southwark Cathedral.

== See also ==
- Massacre of St George's Fields
