= Sam Milgrom =

American gallery owner and art curator

- Born: Steven Allen Milgrom; November 19, 1952 (age 73); Detroit, Michigan
- Other names: Steven Milgrom; Steve Milgrom
- Website: musichead.com

Steven Allen Milgrom (born November 19, 1952), commonly known as Sam Milgrom, is an American gallerist, curator, concert promoter and record store entrepreneur who founded Sam's Jams record stores in Detroit, Michigan, the Magic Bag live music venue in Ferndale, Michigan (a suburb of Detroit), and Musichead Gallery in Los Angeles, the first art gallery to specialize in art related to music from the rock and roll era and beyond.

== 1978–mid-1990s: Sam's Jams Record Stores ==
Sam Milgrom (the nickname "Sam" is an acronym of his full initials) has family roots in retail, as his father was a women's sportswear manufacturer.

He started playing guitar at age six, and played in rock bands from 1968 to 1972 as a lead singer and rhythm guitarist. He studied humanities at Wayne State University. After working for several Detroit area music retailers, including the record store chain Harmony House in Royal Oak, Michigan, he opened the first Sam's Jams record store in a 400-square-foot former insurance office on Woodward Ave in Ferndale, Michigan. The following year he moved to a larger, 1600-square-foot space a few blocks away, and in 1985 to a 10,000-square-foot former grocery store a half block away. He also opened a second store in Livonia. By October 1982 his businesses were making over half a million dollars a year in sales.

In 1985, having moved the Ferndale store to that much larger space, he began hosting free "Live at Sam's" jazz, rock and blues shows and autograph sessions. In January 1986, Detroit Monthly named Sam's Jams "Best Record and Tape Store."

== 1991–1996: Magic Bag Theatre Cafe ==
With years of concert promotion under his belt, in 1991 he founded the 300-seat Magic Bag Theatre Cafe (today known as the Magic Bag), raising the funds partly from selling his house and putting up his two Sam's Jams record stores as collateral. Frank Morgan and Cedar Walton were the featured performers on the opening weekend in May 1991. The venue was known especially for presenting jazz; it also hosted other music genres as well as a "Brew & View" film series. The venue booked national touring acts including El DeBarge, Sheila E., Lee Rocker, Meshell Ndegeocello, Leo Kottke, Patti Smith, Joey DeFrancesco, Junior Wells, The Blasters, Jeff Buckley, and (before they were big) Kid Rock and Jack White.

Meanwhile, Sam's Jams remained in business until the mid-1990s.

== 1998–present: Musichead Art Gallery ==
In 1998 Milgrom opened the Mr Musichead gallery, on Melrose Avenue, the first and only Los Angeles gallery devoted solely to musical subjects.

In 2004 he moved the gallery to a larger space on Sunset Boulevard, and the following year to a still larger space on a revitalizing stretch of West Sunset Boulevard, on a block he dubbed "Rockin' Row." In 2015 the gallery moved again, to a new space across the street. In 2018 it began hosting a "Just Jazz" live music series, run by LeRoy Downs and Frederick Smith Jr. In 2022 Milgrom shortened the gallery's name to Musichead.

As of 2016 the gallery represented more than 60 photographers and artists and by 2022 the roster had increased to over 80.

Milgrom also owns Creative Framing Studio, next door to Musichead.

== Curator ==
Milgrom has curated photography and fine art exhibitions since 2005, working with music photographers as well as musicians who double as visual artists. These exhibitions include:

=== Photography Exhibitions with Morrison Hotel Gallery ===
- Neal Preston (June, 2006)
- Henry Diltz (October, 2006)
- Jim Marshall (February, 2007)
- Bill Wyman (2007)
- David Corio (2007)
- Barrie Wentzell (2007)
- Patti Boyd (October, 2007)
- Danny Clinch (2007)
- Bob Gruen (October, 2008)
- Ethan Russell (April, 2009)

=== Photography Exhibitions at Musichead Gallery ===
- 2005: Neil Zlozower "3.5 Decades of Photography"
- 2007: Steve Joester
- 2008: Karl Ferris "The Psychedelic Experience"
- 2010: Jammin' & Wailin' - A Bob Marley Celebration Feb. 6, 2010
- 2010: Jay Blakesberg "Travelling on a High Frequency"
- 2010: Lisa Law Photo Exhibition
- 2012: David Burnett: Photographs of Bob Marley
- 2012: Duffy
- 2013: Miles Davis The Collected Artworks of Miles Book Release and Art Exhibition
- 2013: Allan Tannenbaum
- 2014: Deborah Feingold
- 2014: Robert Whitman "Robert Whitman Photographs: Prince, Minneapolis, 1977"
- 2014: Kevin Cummins "Moz Goes to Hollywood: Morrissey/The Smiths"
- 2015: Scott Smith "Tom Waits"
- 2016: Ted Russell 'Early Dylan' Photography Exhibit and Book Launch
- 2016: Markus Klinko "Bowie Unseen"
- 2016: George Gruel "Warren Zevon"
- 2016: "Baron Wolman: The Woodstock Years"
- 2016: Andreas Neumann and Matt Helders "American Valhalla, IGGY POP, The Art of Post Pop Depression"
- 2017: Nalinee Darmrong "The Smiths"
- 2018: Robert M. Knight "Rock Gods: Fifty Years of Rock Photography"
- 2018: David Rose "Unseen Springsteen: Intimate Portraits"
- 2018 Chuck D "Artput"
- 2019: Glen Wexler "The '80s Portrait Sessions"
- 2019: Woodstock 50th Anniversary - Baron Wolman, Barry Z Levine + Jason Laure
- 2020: "Eternally Elvis"
- 2021: Gina Schock / Kathy Valentine
- 2022: Steve Rapport "Here Comes The Rain Again"

=== Art exhibitions ===
- 2009: Alan Aldridge "Tripping The Art Fantastic"
- 2017: Robbie Krieger "Light My Fire"
- 2018 Chuck D "Artput"
- 2019: Grace Slick
- 2022: Hayato Takano
