= Street name =

Identifying name given to a street or road

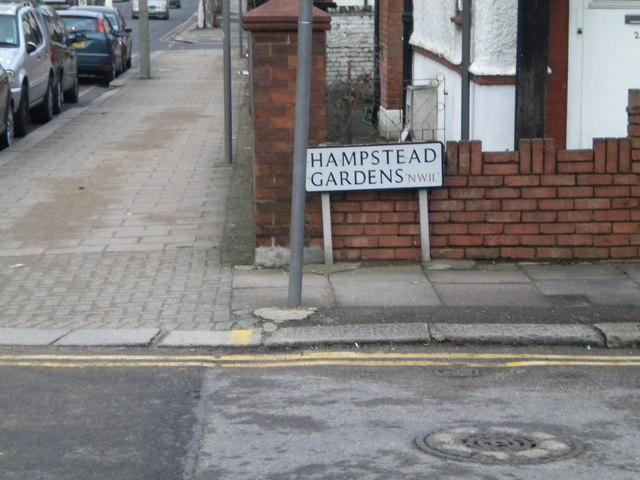
Sign for Hampstead Gardens, a street in London, England

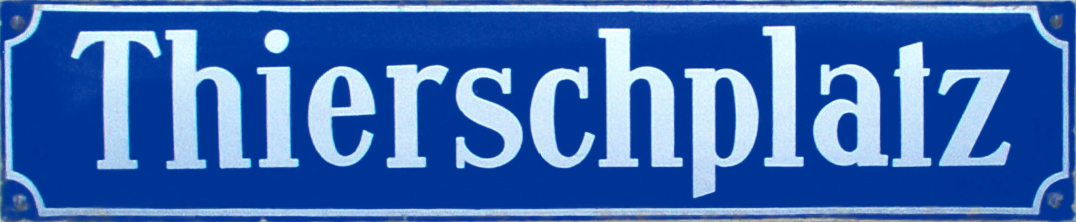
Street sign in Munich, Germany

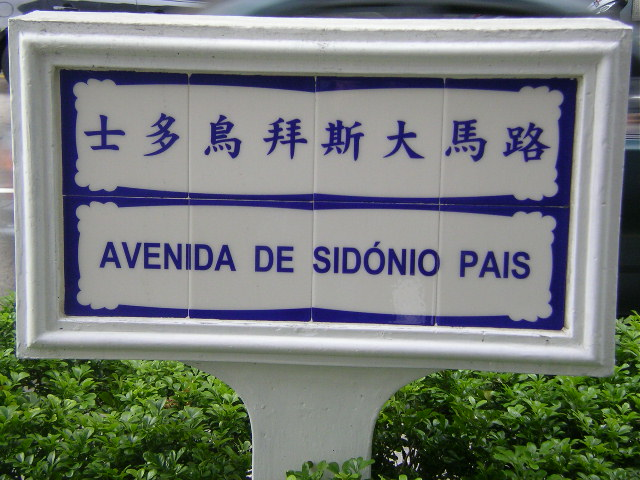
A bilingual sign in Macau with street name in both Chinese and Portuguese

A street name is an identifying name given to a street or road. In toponymic terminology, names of streets and roads are referred to as odonyms or hodonyms (from Ancient Greek ὁδός hodós 'road', and ὄνυμα ónuma 'name', i.e., the Doric and Aeolic form of ὄνομα ónoma 'name'). The street name usually forms part of the address (though addresses in some parts of the world, notably most of Japan, make no reference to street names). Buildings are often given numbers along the street to further help identify them. Odonymy is the study of road names.

Names are often given in a two-part form: an individual name known as the specific, and an indicator of the type of street, known as the generic. Examples are "Main Road", "Fleet Street" and "Park Avenue". The type of street stated, however, can sometimes be misleading: a street named "Park Avenue" need not have the characteristics of an avenue in the generic sense. Some street names have only one element, such as "The Beeches" or "Boulevard". In the 19th and early 20th centuries, it was common when writing a two-part street name (especially in Britain) to link the two parts with a hyphen and not capitalise the generic (e.g. Broad-street, London-road). This practice has now died out.

A street name can also include a direction (the cardinal points east, west, north, south, or the quadrants NW, NE, SW, SE) especially in cities with a grid-numbering system. Examples include "E Roosevelt Boulevard" and "14th Street NW". These directions are often (though not always) used to differentiate two sections of a street. Other qualifiers may be used for that purpose as well. Examples: upper/lower, old/new, or adding "extension".

"Main Street" and "High Street" are common names for the major street in the middle of a shopping area in the United States and the United Kingdom, respectively. The most common street name in the US is "2nd" or "Second".

== Etymologies ==
Streets are normally named, and properties on them numbered, by decision of the local authority, which may adopt a detailed policy. For instance the city of Leeds, UK, provides that:

- property developers should consult with councillors, historic groups, etc. Names should relate to the history of the area or reflect the local landscape and population;
- no living person's names can be used, and the consent of the family is required to use those of the recently deceased;
- no initial 'the', numbers, punctuation or abbreviations are allowed, except St for Saint;
- no name may be changed without the consent of all affected property owners;
- properties shall be numbered from the start of a street, with odd numbers on the left and even numbers on the right;
- individual doors must have their own numbers; for sub-divisions with a shared entrance, flats should always be numbered or lettered but should not be described or suffixed (i.e., Flat 1, 36; or Flat A, 36 but not 36A or First Floor Flat, 36). Flat numbers should start at the main entrance of each floor and go clockwise;
- 'alias names' or 'Vanity Addresses' can be approved along with the number, but these must not be business names;
- the Royal Mail will only register properties which have their own secure letterbox.

The etymology of a street name is sometimes very obvious, but at other times it might be obscure or even forgotten.

In the United States, most streets are named after numbers, landscapes, trees (a combination of trees and landscapes such as "Oakhill" is used often in residential areas), or the surname of an important individual (in some instances, it is just a commonly held surname such as Smith).

Some streets, such as Elm Street in East Machias, Maine, have been renamed due to features changing. Elm Street's new name, Jacksonville Road, was chosen because it leads to the village of Jacksonville. Its former name was chosen because of elm trees; it was renamed when all of the trees along the street succumbed to Dutch elm disease.

The Shambles, derived from the Anglo-Saxon term fleshammels ("meat shelves" in butchers' stalls), is a historical street name which still exists in various cities and towns around England. The best-known example is in York.

The unusual etymologies of quite a few street names in the United Kingdom are documented in Rude Britain, complete with photographs of local signage.

=== Type of commerce or industry ===
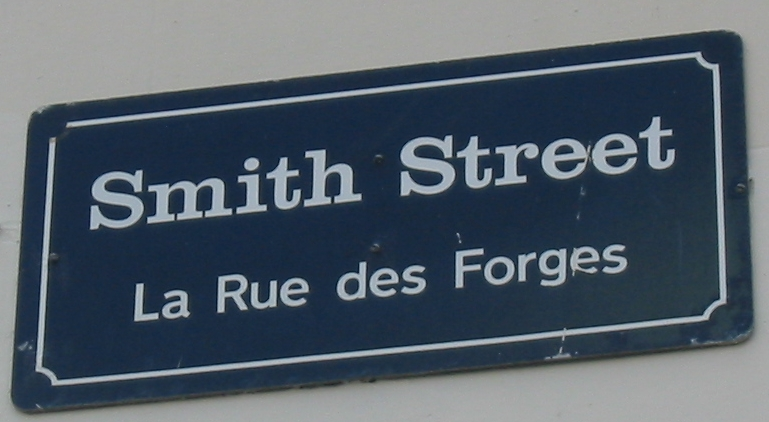
Smith Street/La Rue des Forges refers to the blacksmiths' forges that were formerly situated in this street in Guernsey

In the past, many streets were named for the type of commerce or industry found there. This rarely happens in modern times, but many such older names are still common. Examples are London's Haymarket; Barcelona's Carrer de Moles (Millstone Street), where the stonecutters used to have their shops; and Cannery Row in Monterey, California.

=== Landmarks ===
Some streets are named for landmarks that were in the street, or nearby, when it was built. Such names are often retained after the landmark disappears.

Barcelona's La Rambla is officially a series of streets. The Rambla de Canaletes is named after a fountain that still stands, but the Rambla dels Estudis is named after the Estudis Generals, a university building demolished in 1843, and the Rambla de Sant Josep, the Rambla dels Caputxins, and the Rambla de Santa Monica are each named after former convents. Only the convent of Santa Monica survives as a building, and it has been converted to a museum.

London's Crystal Palace Parade takes its name from a former exhibition centre that stood adjacent to it, destroyed by fire in 1936.

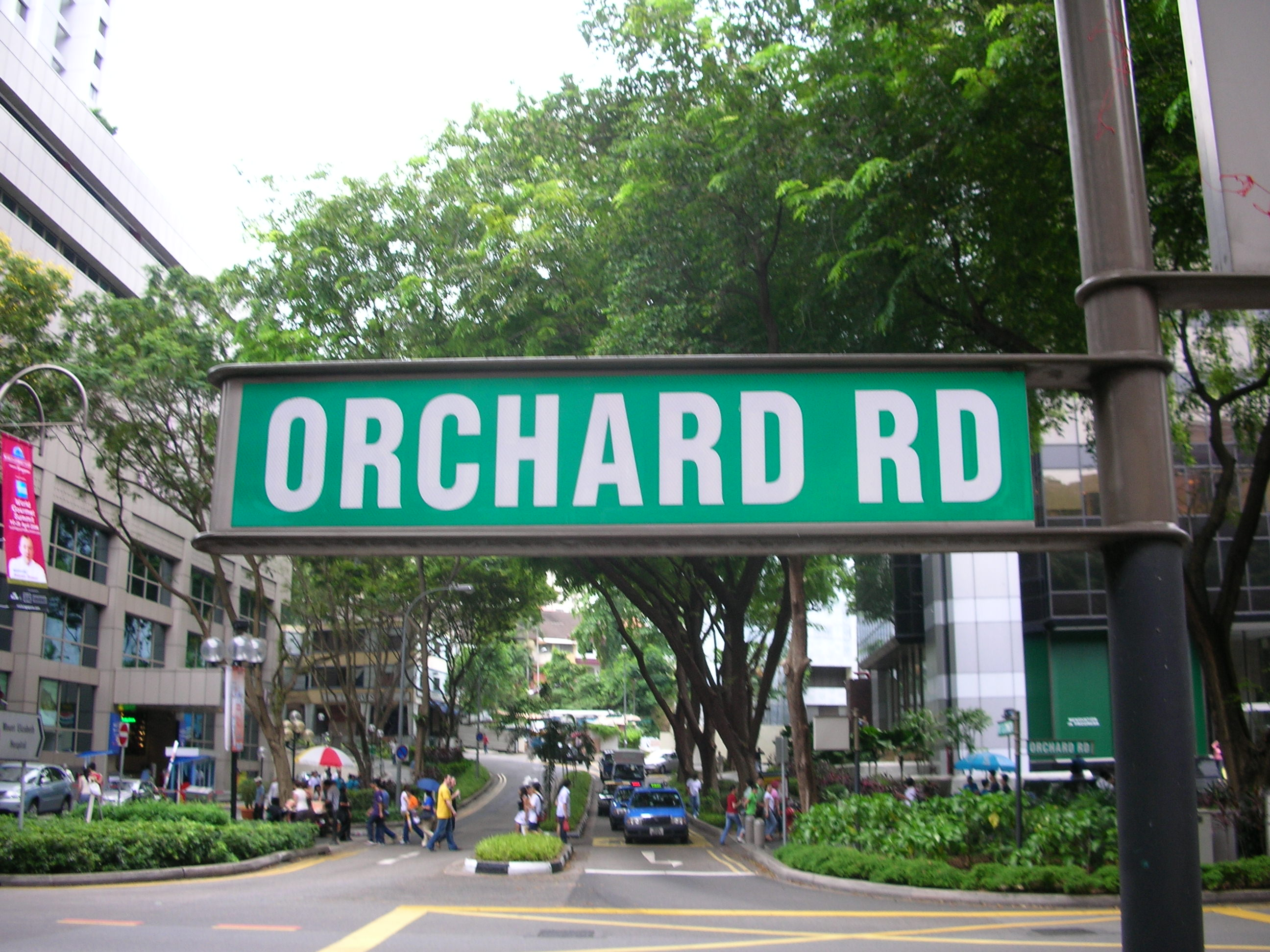
Orchard Road, Singapore, was named for the orchards that formerly lined the road

Sometimes a street is named after a landmark that was destroyed to build that very street. For example, New York's Canal Street takes its name from a canal that was filled in to build it. New Orleans' Canal Street was named for the canal that was to be built in its right-of-way.

=== Self-descriptive names ===
While names such as Long Road or Nine Mile Ride have an obvious meaning, some road names' etymologies are less clear. The various Stone Streets, for example, were named at a time when the art of building paved (stone) Roman roads had been lost. The main road through Old Windsor, UK, is called "Straight Road", and it is straight where it carries that name. Many streets with regular nouns rather than proper nouns, are somehow related to that noun. For example, Station Street or Station Road, do connect to a railway station, and many "Railway Streets" or similar do end at, cross or parallel a railway.

=== Destination ===
Many roads are given the name of the place to which they lead, while others bear the names of distant, seemingly unrelated cities.

As a road approaches its stated destination, its name may be changed. Hartford Avenue in Wethersfield, Connecticut, becomes Wethersfield Avenue in Hartford, Connecticut, for example. A road can switch names multiple times as local opinion changes regarding its destination: for example, the road between Oxford and Banbury changes name five times from the Banbury Road to the Oxford Road and back again as it passes through villages.

Some streets are named after the areas that the street connects. For example, Clarcona Ocoee Road links the communities of Clarcona and Ocoee in Orlando, Florida, and Jindivick–Neerim South Road links the towns of Jindivick and Neerim South in Victoria, Australia.

Some roads are named after their general direction, such as "Great North Road".

Bypasses are often named after the town they route traffic around, for example the Newbury bypass.

=== Distinguished or famous individuals ===
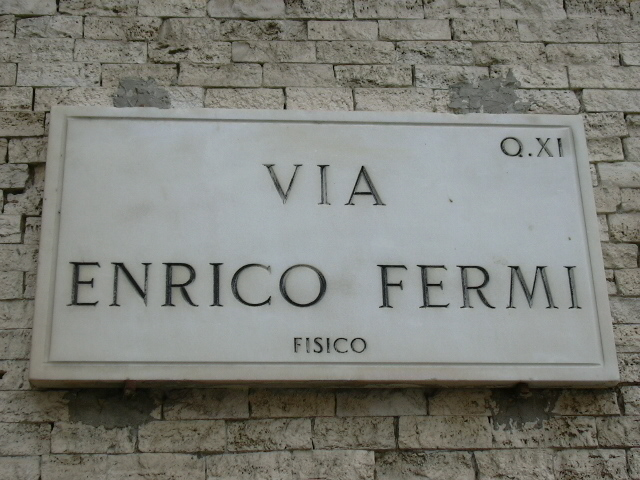
This street in Rome commemorates the physicist Enrico Fermi

Some streets are named after famous or distinguished individuals, sometimes people directly associated with the street, usually after their deaths. Bucharest's Şoseaua Kiseleff was named after the Russian reformer Pavel Kiselyov who had the road built while Russian troops were occupying the city in the 1830s; its Strada Dr. Iuliu Barasch is named after a locally famous physician whose clinic was located there. Many streets named after saints are named because they lead to, or are adjacent to, churches dedicated to them.

Naming a street after oneself as a bid for immortality has a long pedigree: Jermyn Street in London was named by Henry Jermyn, 1st Earl of St Albans, who developed the St. James's area for Charles II of England. Perhaps to dissuade such posterity-seeking, many jurisdictions only allow naming for persons after their death, occasionally with a waiting period of ten years or more. A dozen streets in San Francisco's North Beach neighborhood were renamed in 1988 after deceased local writers; in 1994, the city broke with tradition, honoring Lawrence Ferlinghetti by renaming an alley after the poet within his own lifetime.

Naming a street for a person is very common in many countries, often in the honorand's birthplace. However, it is also the most controversial type of naming, especially in cases of renaming. Two main reasons streets are renamed are: (1) to commemorate a person who lived or worked in that area (for example, Avenue Victor Hugo in Paris, where he resided); or (2) to associate a prominent street in a city after an admired major historical figure even with no specific connection to the locale (for example, René Lévesque Boulevard in Montreal, formerly Dorchester Boulevard). Similarly, hundreds of roads in the United States were named with variations of Martin Luther King Jr., in the years after his 1968 assassination.

Conversely, renaming can be a way to eliminate a name that proves too controversial. For example, Hamburg Avenue in Brooklyn, New York became Wilson Avenue after the United States entered World War I against Germany (see below). In Riverside, California, a short, one-way street named Wong Way was renamed to a more respectful Wong Street, as well as spelled out in Chinese characters to honor the historical Chinatown that once occupied the area.

In a case of a street named after a living person becoming controversial, Lech Wałęsa Street in San Francisco was renamed to Dr. Tom Waddell Place in 2014 after Wałęsa made a public remark against gay people holding major public office.

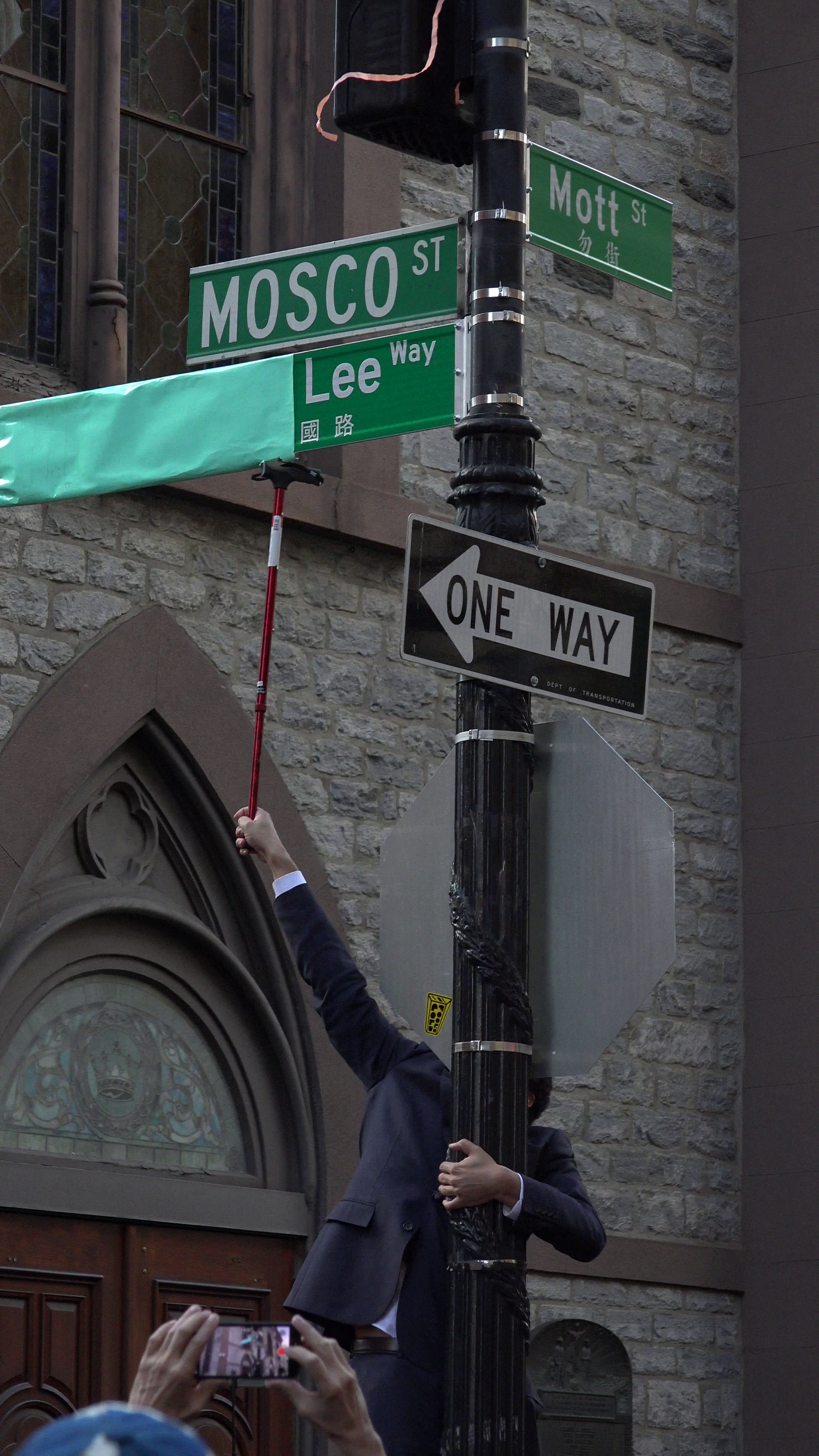
Corky Lee Way is unveiled in New York City in 2023 at the corner of Mott Street and Mosco Street

=== Lettered and numbered streets ===
There are public benefits to having easily understood systems of orderly street names, such as in sequences:

- A Street, B Street, C Street, and so on, ending with Z Street.
  - Cities using the full sequence from A Street to Z Street include Dallas, Texas and others. Sacramento, California's system goes only up to Y Street.
  - The system of lettered street-naming for Washington, D.C. notably includes lettered streets with exceptions that there is no "J Street" and no "X" "Y" or "Z" streets. The omission of J street was due to lack of distinction between I and J in writing practices at the time.

- Avenue A, Avenue B, Avenue C, etc.
  - In Brooklyn, there are streets with letter names (or formerly bearing letter names), or places where such streets would be: List of lettered Brooklyn avenues.
  - The Antelope Valley has a similar system, but with streets in between (e.g. Avenue J-8) taking the name of the first avenue to their north, and suffixed with a number for how many sixteenths of a mile south they are. For example, Avenue J-8 is 8/16 mile (1/2 mile) south of Avenue J.
- Ash St., Bash St., Cash St., Dash St., etc. (one-syllable names in alphabetical order)
- Asher St., Basher St., Casher St., Dasher St., etc. (two-syllable names)
- Asherly, Bemington, Cashburton, Deskowton, etc. (three-syllable names).

A 1950 American Planning Association report supports use of these systems.

=== Other themes ===
Groups of streets in one area are sometimes named using a particular theme. One example is Philadelphia, where the major east–west streets in William Penn's original plan for the city carry the names of trees: from north to south, these were Vine, Sassafras, Mulberry, High (not a tree), Chestnut, Walnut, Locust, Spruce, Pine, Lombard and Cedar. (Sassafras, Mulberry, High and Cedar have since been renamed to Race, Arch, Market [the main east–west street downtown] and South.)

Other examples of themed streets:

- In Washington, D.C., each of the 50 U.S. states has a street named after it (such as Pennsylvania Avenue, which runs from the Capitol to the White House). Most of the "state avenues" cross diagonally through the alphabetic and numbered streets in Washington's grid (see grid systems below).
- In an area of northwest Portland, Oregon, streets are in alphabetical order and are named after important local businessmen and pioneers. The names date back to 1892 when they replaced an alphabetical lettering system. A portion of the area, known as the Alphabet Historic District, is zoned for historic preservation and was added to the National Register of Historic Places in 2000.
- In the area of Puerto Madero, Buenos Aires, Argentina, streets are named after important women.
- Themed street names are very common in Guadalajara, Mexico with names including:
  - Constellations and astronomers in La Calma and Arboledas.
  - Rivers and mountain ranges in Las Águilas (Sierra de Pihuamo, Río Verde...)
  - Aztec places, people and gods in Ciudad del Sol (Axayácatl, Cuauhtémoc, Popocatépetl, Anáhuac...)
  - World cities in Providencia.
  - Hispanic writers and intellectuals in Ladrón de Guevara and nearby areas.
  - Flowers in downhill Bugambilias, animals uphill.
  - Classical artists in La Estancia (Hector Berlioz, Rafael Sanzio, Johann Sebastian Bach...)
  - International writers in Jardines Vallarta.
  - Mexican isles near El Sauz.
  - Countries in Colonia Moderna (Francia, España, Alemania...)
- Tucson, Arizona has streets and avenues, but roads that run diagonally are called "Stravenues".
- Denver, Colorado's north–south streets alternate names in alphabetical order throughout the entire city; for example Albion-Ash-Bellaire-Birch-Clermont-Cherry-Dexter-Dahlia going west–east on the city's east side. (In this double alphabet grouping, the first alphabet is Scottish-themed and the second alphabet is botanically themed.) Alternately, going east–west has the same effect; for example Acoma-Bannock-Cherokee-Delaware-Elati-Fox etc. (Exceptions do exist.) Other themes exist in the city, such as university names (Yale and Dartmouth Avenues) and presidential names (Garfield and Washington Streets). These two common themes are found in many other cities as well, such as Hemet, California, and Torrance, California, respectively.
- Redondo Beach, California, has a series of approximately alphabetical gemstone names (Beryl, Carnelian, Diamond, etc.) for streets crossing Pacific Coast Highway.
- Two Florida cities have streets named after American presidents: Hollywood, and Cape Canaveral.

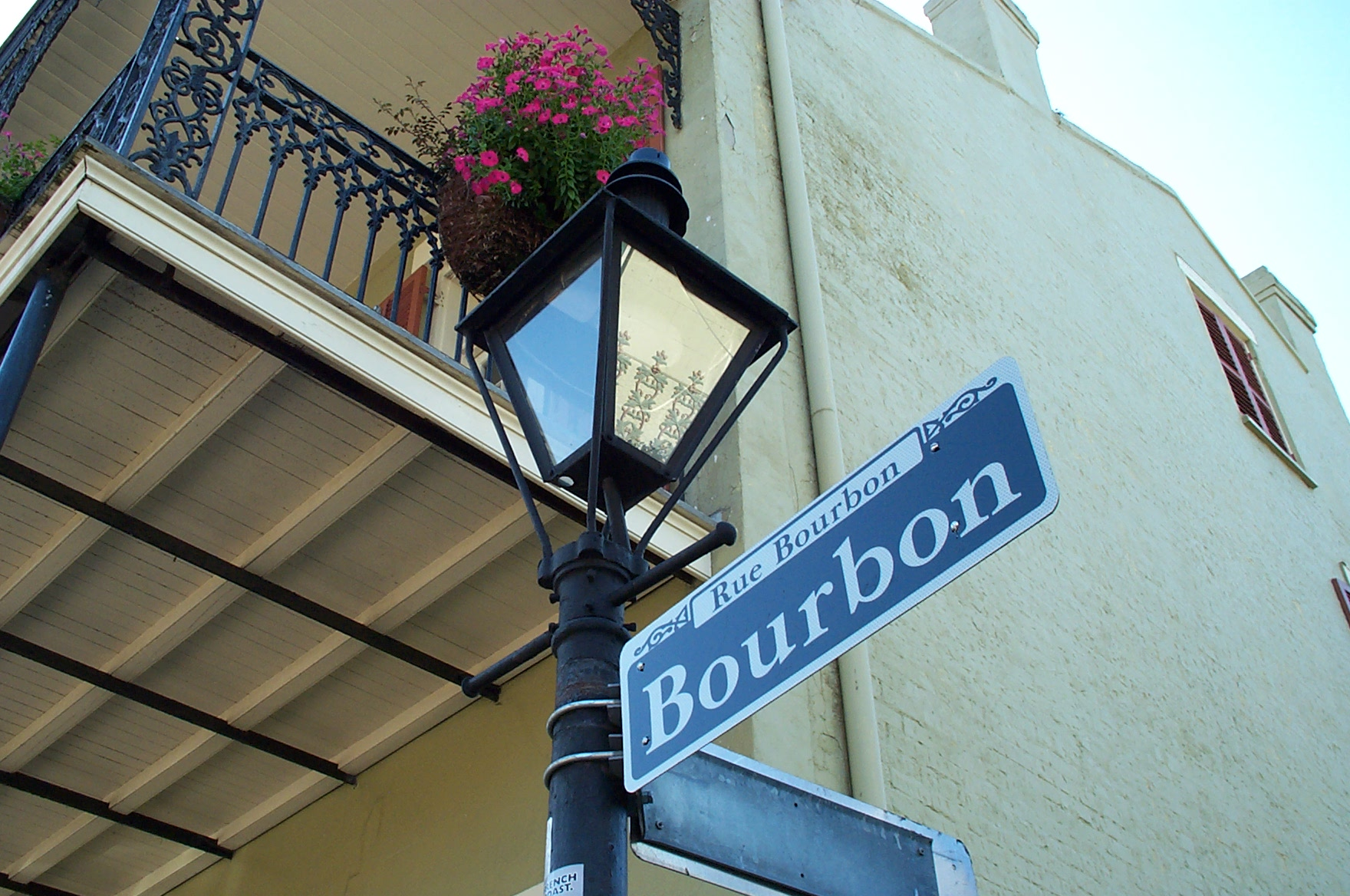
Bourbon Street in New Orleans

- In New Orleans, Louisiana, some streets of the historic French Quarter are named for royal houses of France. Many who visit this neighborhood mistake Bourbon Street to be named after the beverage that many of the street's famous revelers are drinking, while it is actually named after the House of Bourbon, the ruling dynasty of France when the city was built. Similarly, Burgundy Street was named for the House of Burgundy and not the wine. Other streets named for royalties include Dumaine, Toulouse, Conti, Dauphine and Chartres.
- Harrow in London, famous for its public school, has an estate where all the roads are named after former teachers at the school.
- The Toxteth area of Liverpool has 'Welsh Streets', a series of streets named after Welsh places, including Rhiwlas St, Gwydir St, Powis St and Madryn Street, where Beatles drummer Ringo Starr grew up. These streets were refurbished during 2017.
- Worcester has a Canadian themed area with streets named after large cities, provinces, and other locations. Leicester has one area named after nuts; Filbert Street was the home of Leicester City F.C. between 1891 and 2002.
- Leicester also has a series of terraced streets with the names Hawthorne, Alma, Rowan, Ruby, Ivanhoe, Sylvan, Oban, and Newport - the first letter making the name "Harrison" - after the builder. The streets all run into Beatrice Road - named for the builder's wife.
- In Brossard, Quebec, Red Deer, Alberta and Brampton, Ontario, different sections of the town all have streets starting with the same letter; in Brampton, the alphabetical order reflects chronology. Laval, Quebec has an area named for birds; Kirkland, Quebec has an area named after wines. Mississauga, Ontario, Markham, Ontario, and Winston-Salem, North Carolina all have areas named for the characters in Robin Hood.
- Themed names are popular in suburban subdivisions. The subdivision or suburban town may itself give the name of the theme, such as Anjou, Quebec (ex: main street named for René of Anjou, king of Naples) and Lorraine, Quebec (streets all named for towns in eastern France, main street named for Charles de Gaulle, due to his association with the Cross of Lorraine).
- In the Philippines, streets in the South Triangle district of Quezon City were named to commemorate the Boy Scouts that were among the casualties on United Arab Airlines Flight 869 (1963) on their way to the 11th World Scout Jamboree. Streets in Sampaloc, Manila are named after the various books and characters in the works of Jose Rizal.
- Street names in Canberra typically follow a particular theme: the streets of Duffy are named after Australian dams and weirs, the streets of Page are named after biologists and naturalists, and the streets of Gowrie are named after Australian recipients of the Victoria Cross. Latham, named for John Greig Latham, a High Court Justice, has streets named for prominent Australian high court judges. Florey, named for Howard Florey who refined the use of penicillin, has streets named for scientists and physicians.
- Almere in the Netherlands, a planned city founded in 1976, is separated into themed sections. Streets in the city's business district are named for occupations (merchant, poet, real estate agent). Streets in other neighborhoods are named for musical instruments, actors, film directors, islands, months of the year, days of the week, rock stars (Rolling Stones, Jimi Hendrix), fruits, electronics (transistor, microphone, television), and even Dutch comic-book characters. Themed street names are also very common in all other Dutch towns and cities. It is rare to find non-themed neighborhoods built after 1900 in the Netherlands.
- Nearly all of the streets in Leeton, Australia, were named after plants.
- The neighborhood of Cerak Vinogradi in Belgrade, Serbia, has streets named exclusively by the tree species that lines the street: Ash, Linden, Cedar, etc. The only non-tree place name is that of the central green space, "Trg (Square of) S.C. Babovic", though it lacks any signs with the name.
- Street names in Iceland usually have a second element in common throughout a neighborhood. Examples include neighborhoods where the themes are the names of early settlers, ending with –gata (street); and then more nature-oriented ones where the second part is –smári (clover) or –gerði (hedge) with the first part being chosen for alphabetic order.
- San Francisco has five partial alphabets of parallel streets. Three of these series form the grid in the Bayview district (the series Griffith ... Upton crosses the double series Arthur ... Yosemite, Armstrong ... Meade). Another (Anza ... Yorba) crosses the numbered Avenues in the Richmond and Sunset districts, which together are sometimes called "The Avenues". The fourth is the north–south streets of the Sunnyside district (Acadia ... Genesee). San Francisco also has a series of numbered Streets in the Mission and South-of-Market districts.
- Grantham, England: one estate in the northeast of the town has most of its streets named after famous golf courses of the British Isles. The estate itself is named after the middle section of a golf hole.
- The west side of Saskatoon, Saskatchewan, has avenues that go from A to Z, although the majority of Avenue A was renamed to Idylwyld Drive. Although it was not officially named, Witney Avenue in the Meadowgreen and Mount Royal neighborhoods has been unofficially dubbed Avenue Z since it is the last street which runs parallel to Avenue Y.
- In Gander, Newfoundland, every street is named after a pilot, honoring the town's aviation history.
- Downtown Memphis, Tennessee, has five main avenues named after the first five presidents: Washington (northernmost), Adams, Jefferson, Madison and Monroe (southernmost). These streets were laid out in the original plan of Memphis in the early 1820s, shortly after the election of the sixth president John Quincy Adams. (The series was not continued with a second Adams Avenue.)
- Downtown of Ljubljana, Slovenia, has a grid system of roads and Ljubljanica river banks named after famous Slovenian writers, poems or artists, such as France Prešeren and Ivan Cankar. A neighbourhood named Murgle (in Southern Vič district) contains a street naming system based on names of trees planted on sides of the streets, e.g. Under Maples, Under Oaks and Under Willows.
- In Palo Alto, California, streets in the College Terrace neighborhood (which borders the Stanford University campus) are named after distinguished colleges and universities. The streets running north–south start at the westernmost end of the neighborhood alphabetically: Amherst, Bowdoin, Columbia, and Dartmouth. After Dartmouth, the streets do not follow the alphabet (except for the last streets, Wellesley, Williams, and Yale): Hanover, Harvard, Oberlin, Princeton, and Cornell. The backbone of the neighborhood running west–east is College Avenue, and the northernmost street, Stanford Avenue also runs west–east.
- In Garfield Heights, Ohio, there is a tree theme with streets named Oak Park Drive, Shady Oak Blvd, Woodward Blvd, Eastwood Blvd, Oakview Blvd, and Maple Leaf Drive.
- Streets in the suburb of Chapelford in Warrington, England take their names from US place names, centering on Boston Boulevard and including Michigan Place, Orlando Drive and Portland Road. This theme was chosen as this suburb has been built over most of the former RAF Burtonwood site and the surrounding area. This airbase was used extensively by the USAAF during the Second World War and was once the largest airfield in Europe.
- In Palm Coast, Florida, nearly the entire city is divided into "alphabet letter" neighborhoods. The northernmost neighborhood has all "L" street names, whether the street runs north–south or east–west (Ex. Lakeview Blvd, Lancelot Drive, Lancaster Lane, Linnet Way). Other neighborhoods consist of only "B" (Bird of Paradise Dr, Belle Terre Pkwy, Bickwick Ln), "F" (Fellowship Dr, Forest Grove Dr, Fircrest Ln), "C" (Curry Ct, Colorado Dr, Colechester Ln), "P" (Parkview Dr, Prairie Ln, Pacific Dr), "W" (Wellington Dr, Williams Dr, Waters Ct), and "R" (Rymfire Dr, Ravenwood Dr, Royal Tern Ln) street names.
- In Warley, Brentwood, Essex, a fairly recent development has street names themed around English composer Ralph Vaughan Williams; the main road running through the development aptly named "Vaughan Williams Way", with examples of smaller roads on the estate named "Lark Close" and "Tallis Way" after the composer's works "The Lark Ascending" and "Fantasia on a Theme by Thomas Tallis", respectively.
- A large housing estate in the City of Wolverhampton, England was built upon the former Goodyear Tyre complex; each phase has a theme related to that history. In one, the streets are named after the Goodyear Blimps (Enterprise, Europa etc.), and in another for racetracks where Goodyear Tyres were prevalent (Mallory, Donington, Rockingham etc.).
- In Austin, Texas, the north-to-south Streets were named for major Texas rivers following the order as they generally appeared on Texas maps in the 1830s, with the exception being Congress, which runs up to the Texas State Capital (itself named for the pre-statehood Republic of Texas's Congress), and additional streets being named for smaller rivers. Streets running east-to-west are actually shown as either numbered streets, trees found in the state, or sometimes both, on various maps from the city's founding up into the mid-20th century. There is no good historical information as to why eventually the tree names were dropped in favor of numbered streets, but the tree names live on in various festivals, business names, and landmarks.

=== Grid-based naming systems ===
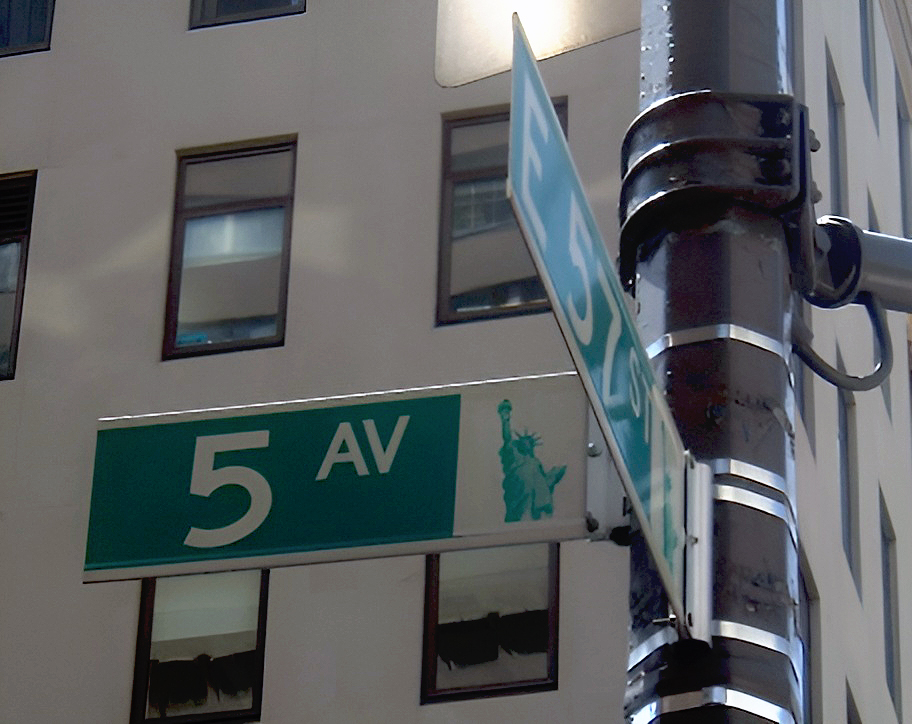
Fifth Avenue and East 57th Street in New York City

In many cities laid out on a grid plan, the streets are named to indicate their location on a Cartesian coordinate plane. For example, the Commissioners' Plan of 1811 for Manhattan provided for numbered streets running parallel to the minor axis of the island and numbered and lettered avenues running parallel to the long axis of the island, although many of the avenues have since been assigned names for at least part of their courses.

In the city plan for Washington, D.C., north–south streets were numbered away from the United States Capitol in both directions, while east–west streets were lettered away from the Capitol in both directions and diagonal streets were named after various States of the Union. As the city grew, east–west streets past W Street were given two-syllable names in alphabetical order, then three-syllable names in alphabetical order, and finally names relating to flowers and shrubs in alphabetical order. Even in communities not laid out on a grid, such as Arlington County, Virginia, a grid-based naming system is still sometimes used.

Often, the numbered streets run east–west and the numbered avenues north–south, following the style adopted in Manhattan, although this is not always observed. In some cases, streets in "half-blocks" in between two consecutive numbered streets have a different designator, such as Court or Terrace, often in an organized system where courts are always between streets and terraces between avenues. Sometimes yet another designator (such as "Way", "Place", or "Circle") is used for streets which go at a diagonal or curve around, and hence do not fit easily in the grid.

In many cases, the block numbers correspond to the numbered cross streets; for instance, an address of 1600 may be near 16th Street or 16th Avenue. In a city with both lettered and numbered streets, such as Washington, D.C., the 400 block may be between 4th and 5th streets or between D and E streets, depending on the direction in which the street in question runs. However, addresses in Manhattan have no obvious relationship to cross streets or avenues, although various tables and formulas are often found on maps and travel guides to assist in finding addresses.

Examples of grid systems:

- In Denver, Colorado, all roads running east–west are given "Avenue" designations, while those running north–south are given "Street" designations. Sometimes, additional designations are given based on physical characteristics of the road (for example, 6th Avenue Parkway and Monaco Street Parkway both contain large medians consisting of trees and walkways). Denver carries numbered Avenues north of Ellsworth, the center of the address system in Denver. Broadway carries alphabetical streets east and west. For example, 100 North Broadway is at First Avenue and Broadway. Alternately, 100 West Ellsworth is at Ellsworth and Acoma Street.
- In Salt Lake City, Utah, the road system is generally based on the headquarters of the Church of Jesus Christ of Latter-day Saints. Salt Lake City is also known to have a number-based naming system. For example, one may find the address of a local store at 4570 South 4000 West, where 4000 West (or 40th West) is the name of the street and 4570 is the number on the building. This means the store is approximately 45 blocks south and 40 blocks west of the LDS temple. Similar Cartesian coordinate systems are used in other Utah cities and towns. Some towns in Indiana follow the same practice, as do many cities and towns in eastern Idaho.
- The Chicago, Illinois, grid system extends throughout the entire city and into some of its suburbs. It divides the city into four quadrants, with the zero point being the intersection of State Street (0 E/W) and Madison Street (0 N/S) in the "Loop". All streets bear a directional prefix indicating their position relative to State and Madison, which is never omitted when writing an address (and rarely in speech). "Blocks", which have a range of 100 numbers, are approximately 1/8 mile long (except between Madison and 31st Streets, where blocks are slightly shorter, given a three-mile distance between the streets). Many neighborhoods have intermediate blocks at 1/16 mile intervals as well. The most important streets occur every mile (i.e., every 800 numbers), with secondary streets at half-mile intervals. North–south streets are always named, while east–west streets are named on the North Side and numbered on the South Side. Most City of Chicago residents know at least a few of the major streets and their grid positions (i.e., North Avenue = 1600 N, Cicero Avenue = 4800 W). Thus addresses in Chicago are commonly given two ways: in Cartesian coordinates (3400 North, 2800 West) or as number and name (3324 North California), with the expectation that the nearest cross street, or at least the distance from State Street or Madison Streets can be appropriately deduced from the address number (i.e., 3324 N = slightly more than 4 miles north of State and Madison Streets). Diagonal streets are given directional suffixes based on whether their angle is more vertical or more horizontal, and their numbering corresponds with the rest of the grid.
- In Detroit, Michigan, and the suburbs to the north, major roads were generally built every mile, and many of the east–west roads are numbered in the Mile Road System based on their distance from the start of Michigan Avenue. These roads are named with "Mile Road", from 5 Mile to 37 Mile. Addresses in much of the area are counted from the beginning of Woodward Avenue in Detroit, with roughly 2000 addresses assigned per mile, not coinciding with the Mile Road numbers; for instance, 8 Mile is the 20700 block, not 800 or 8000.
- In Melbourne's Central Business District, the streets were laid out in what has become known as the Hoddle Grid. It is 1 mile long by 0.5 miles wide (1.6 km by 0.8 km.) The major streets are 1.5 chains wide (30m) and halfway between the city's major thoroughfares that run parallel to the Yarra River are the "little" streets. These streets share the same name as the major street to the south (Flinders St, Flinders Lane; Collins Street, Little Collins Street; Bourke Street, Little Bourke Street; Lonsdale Street, Little Lonsdale Street; and finally La Trobe Street) and are only half a chain wide. This forces them to be one-way streets, but they allow each city block to be exactly 10 chains square.

== By country ==
- Odonymy in France
- Odonymy in the United Kingdom

=== Italy ===
In Italy, streets are named with a category and a proper name. The most common categories are via (road), vicolo (lane), corso (broadway/boulevard), piazza (square), strada (highway), viale (avenue), piazzale/largo (plaza), località/frazione (settlement), all with commonly used abbreviations, to which many other categories can be added, some of which being descriptive enough that they usually appear without any name attached to it, e.g. Lungarno meaning "Arno Riverbank". As the default word for a street is via, any street name without the category is tacitly presumed to be a via; this can lead to confusing cases if the full street name is just the category itself, such as Lungarno, which can be arbitrarily reanalysed as via Lungarno.

The street's proper name could be anything such as a person (e.g. via Giuseppe Garibaldi, where it is common to initialize or forego the given name, yielding via G. Garibaldi or via Garibaldi; associations of people may also be used, such as via fratelli Rosselli [which can be abbreviated to via f.lli Rosselli] or via Ragazzi del '99 [named after the late World War I drafting of people born in 1899] or via Partigiani; roads named after nobility of course feature no surname and they cannot be abbreviated at all, e.g. via papa Giovanni XXIII), a saint (via san Francesco, with the saint part being abbreviated to S. in many instances), a place (via Roma), an event, marker or idea (via Mercato Nuovo, via della Battaglia, via della Libertà, respectively meaning New Market Road, Road of the Battle, Liberty Road, none of which can be abbreviated any further, even though the preposition after the category is sometimes forgotten by people) or a date (via XX Settembre; it has been customary to write the day in Roman numerals, but it is considered to be legally improper since 2016). Numbered streets are essentially non-exstant, as non-limited access country highways crossing a settled area will usually gain a proper name anyway, the default being the name of either direction of the highway or via Nazionale (literally, Country Road). In hamlets, it is not rare for the only registered street name to simply be località/frazione followed by the hamlet name.

Streets are named by the municipality. Naming streets after living people is not allowed and ten years need to be elapsed since they have been declared dead. Streets named after places may sometimes be named due to the street leading there (e.g. corso Moncalieri in Turin does lead to Moncalieri), but it should not be presumed to be the case (via Genova in Turin does not lead to Genoa); almost all cities in Italy also feature a via Roma due to a 1931 decree that forced them to have one, but many have reverted or otherwise changed their via Roma to another name.

When a street or a street portion is renamed, usually the plaque will still show for some period the old name, so that mail can still be routed properly. There is, however, no obligation for a road to be renamed just because there has been updates of the eponymous entity: corso Unione Sovietica was never presumed to be renamed to corso Russia; many Milan roads still use Italianized forenames, such as via Giorgio Washington, and there is no obligation for them to switch to the endonym via George Washington.

By law, two roads in the same municipality cannot share the same name (for roads named after people, the family name is the one that gets compared, not the full name. E.g., a municipality cannot have both a via Mario Rossi and a via Francesco Rossi, because both would be shortened to via Rossi), unless they are different categories. In case of muncipality mergers, any case of hononymy needs to be sorted out. In practice, most municipalities avoid using the same name for two different roads even if in different categories, unless they are bordering each other, as it could still be confusing for wayfinding.

Roundabouts, although uninhabitable by definition, sometimes do receive their own street name, with rotonda or rotatoria as the category. This name is, however, completely ignored for most wayfinding purposes, as any building near it will have its house number tied to the street or square, not the roundabout. As an example, in Rome, there's rotatoria Benigno Zaccagnini: although the name is legally registered, wayfinding software will not log it and will instead default for neighbouring viale Spinelli, via Chiaromonte or via Agliatta.

== Grammar ==
In languages that have grammatical cases, the specific part of a road name is typically in the possessive or genitive case, meaning "the road of [Name]". Where the specific is an adjective (as in "High Street"), however, it is inflected to match the generic.

== Street renaming ==
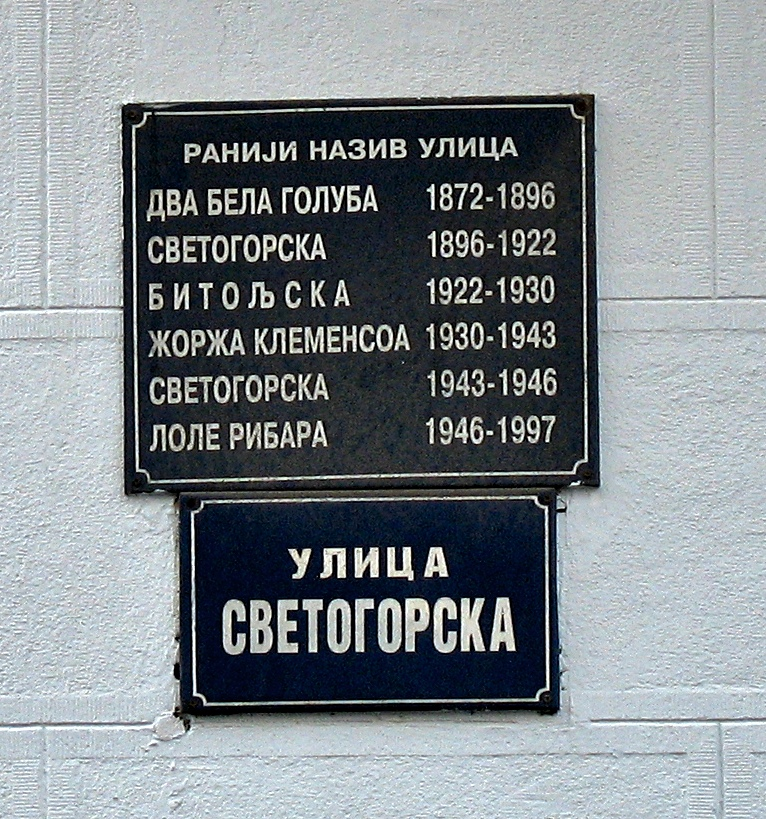
Names are sometimes changed for political purposes. A Belgrade street that began as "Two White Doves" in 1872 was renamed Svetogorska in 1896, Bitoljska in 1922, for Georges Clemenceau in 1930, Svetogorska again in 1943, for Lola Ribar in 1946, and Svetogorska again in 1997.

Street names are usually renamed after political revolutions and regime changes for ideological reasons. In postsocialist Romania, after 1989, the percentage of street renaming ranged from 6% in Bucharest, and 8% in Sibiu, to 26% in Timișoara.

Street names can be changed relatively easily by municipal authorities for various reasons. Sometimes streets are renamed to reflect a changing or previously unrecognized ethnic community or to honour politicians or local heroes. In towns such as Geneva, Brussels, Namur and Poznań initiatives have recently been taken to name or rename more streets and other public spaces after women.

A changed political regime can trigger widespread changes in street names – many place names in Zimbabwe changed following their independence in 1980, with streets named after British colonists being changed to those of Zimbabwean nationalist leaders. After Ukraine's pro-Western revolution in 2014, a street named after Patrice Lumumba in Kyiv was renamed the street of John Paul II.

In Portugal, both the Republican Revolution in 1910 and the Carnation Revolution in 1974 triggered widespread changes in street names to replace references to the deposed regimes (the Monarchy and Estado Novo respectively) with references to the revolutions themselves, as well as to figures and concepts associated with them.

In response to the United Nations General Assembly Resolution 3379, Israel renamed streets called "UN Avenue" in Haifa, Jerusalem, and Tel Aviv to "Zionism Avenue".

Some international causes célèbres can attract cities around the world to rename streets in solidarity; for example a number of streets with South African embassies were renamed honouring Nelson Mandela during his imprisonment.

Street names can also be changed to avoid negative associations, like Malbone Street in Brooklyn, New York City, renamed Empire Boulevard after the deadly Malbone Street Wreck; Cadieux Street in Montreal renamed De Bullion because the original name became infamous by the former presence of many bordellos; and several streets in the German Village area of Columbus, Ohio which were renamed with more "American" sounding names around World War I due to popular anti-German sentiments. Similarly, Hamburg Avenue in Brooklyn was renamed Wilson Avenue during World War I.

Street names also can change due to a change in official language. After the death of Francisco Franco, the Spanish transition to democracy gave Catalonia the status of an autonomous community, with Catalan as a co-official language. While some street names in Catalonia were changed entirely, most were merely given the Catalan translations of their previous Castilian names; for example, Calle San Pablo (Saint Paul Street) in Barcelona became Carrer Sant Pau. In most cases, this was a reversion to Catalan names from decades earlier, before the beginning of the Franco dictatorship in 1939.

In a similar way, English street names were changed to French in Quebec during the 1970s, after French was declared the sole language for outdoor signage. This was met with hurt and anger by many of the province's Anglophones, who wished to retain their traditional placenames. The government body responsible for overseeing the enacting of the Charter of the French Language continues to press English-majority communities to further gallicise their street names (for example, what was once "Lakeshore Road" was changed to "Chemin Lakeshore" in the 1970s, with the Office québécois de la langue française pressuring a further change to "Chemin du Bord-du-Lac", completely calquing the English name into French).

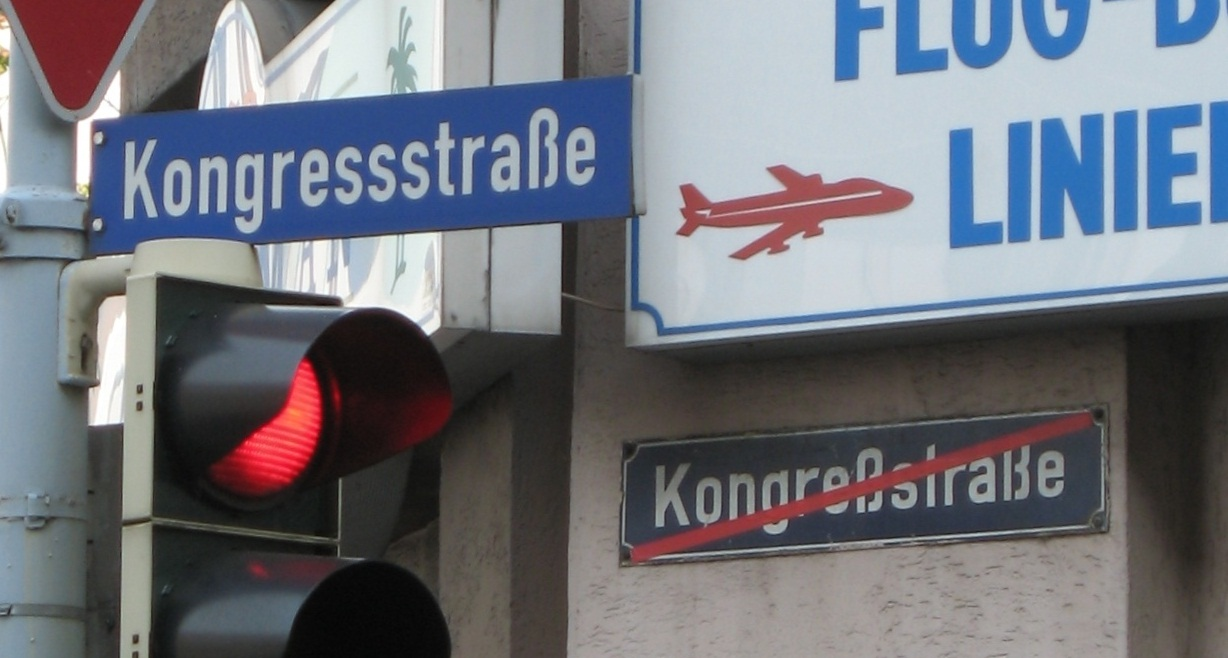
A street name sign adapted to reformed German spelling

Sometimes, when communities are consolidated, the streets are renamed according to a uniform system. For example, when Georgetown became part of Washington, D.C., the streets in Georgetown were renamed as an extension of Washington's street-naming convention. Also, when leaders of Arlington County, Virginia, asked the United States Post Office Department to place the entire county in the "Arlington, Virginia" postal area, the Post Office refused to do so until the county adopted a uniform addressing and street-naming system, which the county did in 1932.

In 1906, Cleveland, Ohio renamed streets to a numbered system. For an example Erie Street became East 9th Street, Bond Street became East 6th Street, and so forth. In Cleveland and its suburbs, all north–south streets are numbered from Cleveland's Public Square and east–west streets are numbered from the northernmost point in Cuyahoga County, which is in the City of Euclid. Bedford, Berea, and Chagrin Falls do not adhere to the grid rules of Cleveland. After World War I, Cleveland renamed a numbered street to Liberty Boulevard, to commemorate Cleveland area soldiers who had been killed in the Great War; in 1981, this street was renamed to Martin Luther King Jr. Drive.

In the New York City borough of Queens, a huge street renaming campaign began in the early 20th century, changing almost all of the street names into numbers, in accordance with the adoption of a new unified house numbering scheme. Some New York City Subway stations retained their names, instead of changing with their corresponding street(s). A few examples survive today, such as 33rd Street–Rawson Street station.

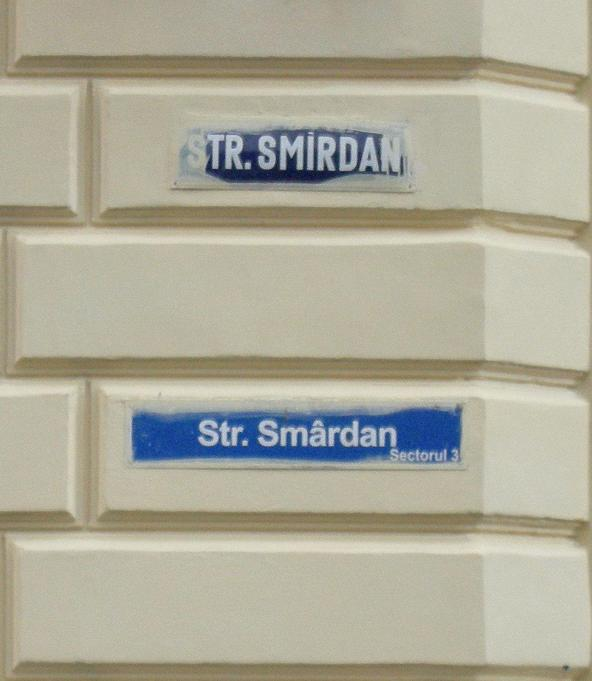
Pre- (top) and post-1993 (bottom) street signs in Bucharest, showing the two different Romanian spellings of the same name

Sometimes street renaming can be controversial, because of antipathy toward the new name, the overturning of a respected traditional name, or confusion from the altering of a familiar name useful in navigation. A proposal in 2005 to rename 16th Street, N.W., in Washington, D.C., "Ronald Reagan Boulevard" exemplified all three. Issues of familiarity and confusion can be addressed by the street sign showing the current name and, in smaller writing, the old name. One compromise when the issue is more political can be "co-naming", when the old name is fully retained but the street is also given a second subsidiary name, which may be indicated by a smaller sign underneath the 'main' name. (See section below on "Multiple names for a single street".)

It is also controversial because it is seen by many as a way to rewrite history, even if the original name is not well-liked but nevertheless traditional or convenient. It can be used to erase the presence of a cultural group or previous political regime, whether positive or negative, and to show the supremacy of a new cultural group or political regime. A prime example of this type of name change was the renaming of Montreal's Dorchester Boulevard, the nexus of the financial and business district, named for governor Lord Dorchester, to René Lévesque Boulevard, after a French-language reformist premier of Quebec. City officials rushed the name change, without waiting the required one-year mourning period after Lévesque's death. Many Anglophones were outspoken in their opposition to the name change, and the majority English-speaking city of Westmount retained Dorchester as the name of their portion of the street in protest.

Another example is that of a street in Paris called Rue de Saint-Pétersbourg; the street's name was changed to Rue de Pétrograd after the eponymous Russian city changed its name in 1914. The Parisian street had its name changed again to Rue de Léningrad in 1945, shortly after the liberation of Paris, and reverted to its original name after the fall of the Soviet regime in Russia in 1991.

After most of Ireland became independent as the Irish Free State in 1922, many streets had their names changed, with the names of English monarchs, nobility and administrators replaced with Irish patriots. Dublin's main thoroughfare was known as Sackville Street (named after Lionel Sackville, 1st Duke of Dorset), becoming O'Connell Street in 1924. Similarly, Limerick's George's Street (named after George III) was renamed O'Connell Street. Great Britain Street, Dublin became Parnell Street (after Charles Stewart Parnell). Limerick's Brunswick Street (named after the House of Brunswick) became Sarsfield Street. Cork's George's Street (after George I) became Oliver Plunkett Street, after the Catholic martyr Oliver Plunkett.

Many streets with royal and colonial names still remain in the Republic of Ireland, and local councils occasionally debate their removal. In 2019, Cork City Councillor Diarmaid Ó Cadhla painted over the name of "Victoria Road" and several others, and was charged with criminal damage. He said that there were "about 80 or 90 streets named after criminals and aristocrats in our city, and in Victoria’s case a genocidal queen responsible for the murder and displacement of two million Irish people," referring to the Great Famine.

== Multiple names for a single street ==
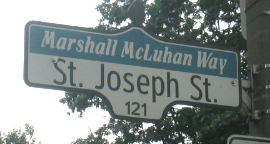
The section of St. Joseph Street running through Toronto's University of St. Michael's College is co-named Marshall McLuhan Way.

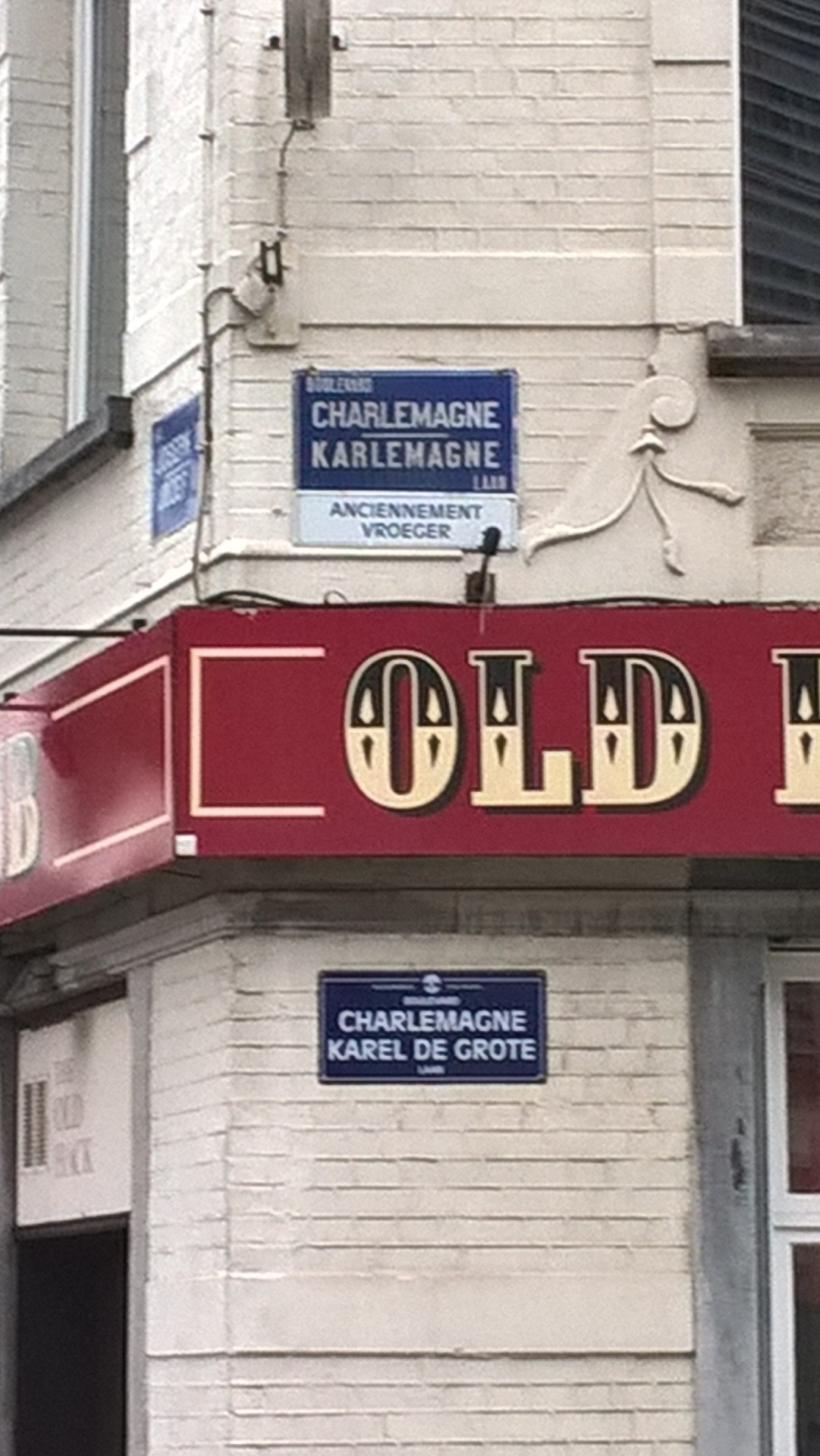
Karlemagnelaan vs. Karl de Grotelaan, Brussels

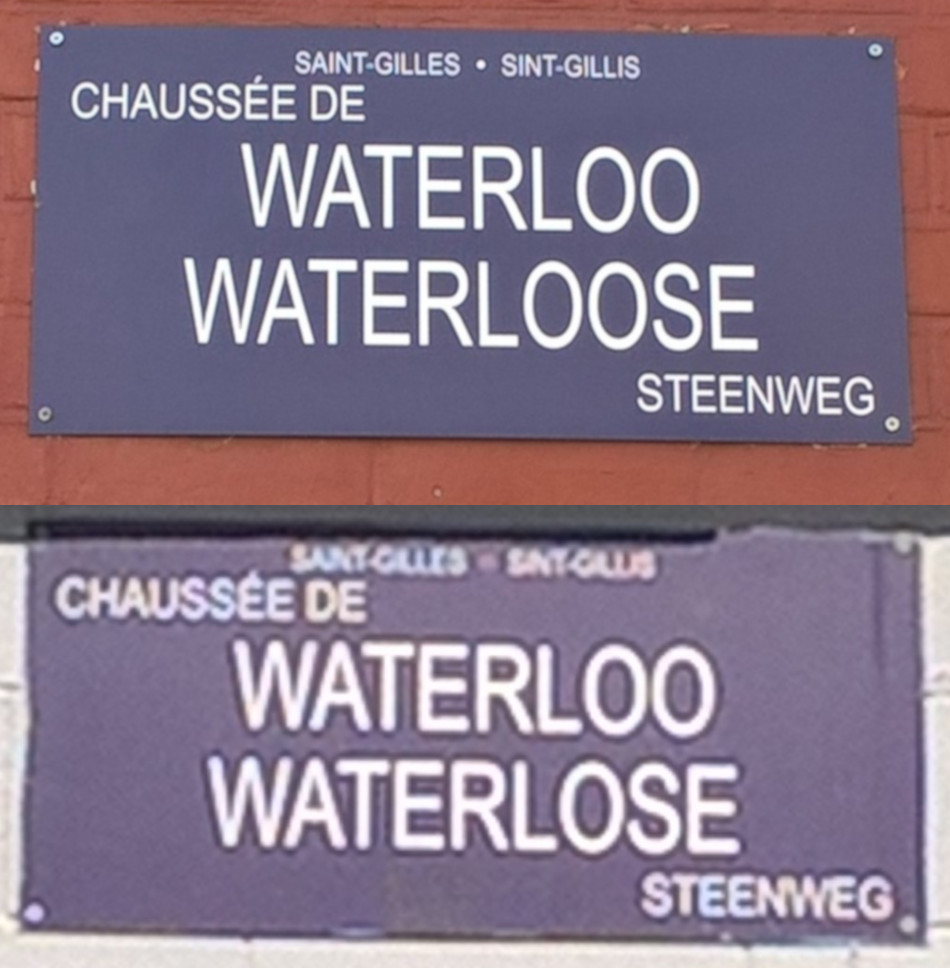
Waterloose vs. Waterlose

It is very common for what is effectively a single street to have different names for different portions of the street. Usually, this occurs at an intersection or other junction. However, in London, Parliament Street becomes Whitehall mid-block in front of two buildings, marking a palace which burnt down in 1688.

Cairo's Muizz Li-Din Allah Street changes its name as one walks through. It may variously be referred to by locals as Souq Al-Nahhasin ("Coppersmith Bazaar") or Souq Al-Attarin ("Spices Bazaar") or Souq Al-Sagha ("Goldsmith and Jeweler Bazaar"), according to historical uses, as in "Type of commerce or industry" above. (For a tourist, that might be misleading. These Cairene names identify both a "segment" within the street, and "sub-areas" in the city.)

Some major roads may have two names of different types, such as the Hume Highway/Sydney Road in outer northern Melbourne, which is exclusively Sydney Road closer to the city and exclusively the Hume Highway outside Melbourne, or the Hoddle Highway which is better known as Hoddle Street north of Bridge Road and Punt Road south of it.

Where a street crosses or forms (straddles) a boundary, its two sides sometimes have different names. Examples include Seton Avenue (Bronx) / Mundy Lane (Mount Vernon, New York); Station Road (Portslade) / Boundary Road (Hove, East Sussex); Lackman Road (Lenexa) / Black Bob Road (Olathe, Kansas). Two such streets intersect along the corporation limit between Cincinnati and its enclave Norwood.

A portion of a street may have two equally acceptable legal names. There are several cases of the latter in New York City: Sixth Avenue in Manhattan was renamed as Avenue of the Americas in 1945, but the name never really stuck; the city now considers both names equally acceptable, and both appear on street signs. Manhattan street signs now also designate a portion of Seventh Avenue as Fashion Avenue, and Avenue C is also Loisaida Avenue, from a Spanglish pronunciation of Lower East Side.

Streets can have multiple names because of multilingualism. Streets in Brussels often have a Dutch name and a French name, both languages being official: for example "Bergstraat" (Dutch) and "Rue de la Montagne" (French), both meaning "Mountain Street". While the older streets were originally named in Dutch and calqued into French, some more recent ones, conceived in French, have been calqued into Dutch. For instance Boulevard Charlemagne was retranslated from Karlemagnelaan to Karel de Grotelaan, and Rue du Beau Site in Ixelles from the literal Schoonzichtstraat to the more idiomatic Welgelegenstraat.

Occasionally there is confusion over which is the best translation, as is the case with the Chaussée de Waterloo in St-Gilles, Brussels, which is variously rendered as Waterlosesteenweg and Waterloosesteenweg. Similarly, the name may change when the street lies on or across a border between areas with different languages: Nieuwstraat (Kerkrade, Netherlands) / Neustraße (Herzogenrath, Germany), both names meaning "New Street".

In Zaandam, Netherlands, streets in the Russiche Buurt (Russian Neighbourhood) are named after Russians, commemorating Tsar Peter I's visit in 1697. These are named bilingually, for instance Tolstoistraat/Улица Толстого.

In Vancouver, Canada, šxʷməθkʷəy̓əmasəm Street has the English name "Musqueamview Street" for situations where the main Halkomelem version cannot be used, including in mail delivery systems.

== Multiple streets sharing the same name ==
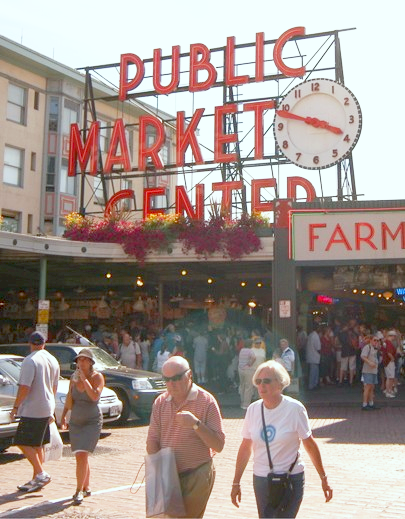
Corner of Pike and Pike, Seattle

In many cases, more than one street in a locality will have the same name: for example, Bordesley Green and Bordesley Green Road, both in the Bordesley Green section of Birmingham, England, and the fifteen separate Abbey Roads in London. The city of Boston has five Washington Streets. Atlanta famously has many streets that share the name Peachtree: Peachtree Street, Drive, Plaza, Circle, Way, Walk, and many other variations that include "Peachtree" in the name, such as West Peachtree Street.

Occasionally, these streets intersect each other, as with Pike Place and Pike Street, and Ravenna Boulevard and Ravenna Avenue in Seattle, Washington. Kansas City, Missouri, has a Gillham Road, Gillham Street, and Gillham Plaza all running parallel to each other. In many cities in Alberta, new developments have only a few common street names, which are followed by variant types such as Boulevard, Drive, Crescent and Place.

The Philadelphia Main Line of Philadelphia, near Conshohocken, Pennsylvania, contains a number of roads named Gulph, including Gulph Road, Upper Gulph Road, New Gulph Road, Old Gulph Road, Gulph Creek Road, Gulph Creek Drive, Gulph Lane, Gulph Hills Road, North Gulph Road, and South Gulph Road. In some cases, these roads intersect each other multiple times, creating confusion for those unfamiliar with the local geography.

Some cities such as Fresno, California use the same street name and suffix (street, ave, road, etc.) for several stretches of road. As a rule, these streets are usually in direct line with each other, but with a several block break in between sections. The breaks are usually caused by limited access (one or two entrance) housing subdivisions, or other multi block land uses (schools, parks, industrial plants, and even farm fields in the outskirts of towns). For example, a street may end in the 500 block and restart in the 900 block. Thus there will be no addresses in the 600, 700 or 800 block. St. Clair Avenue in Toronto is an example of this. The practice is also common in Philadelphia, as for example Sartain Street.

== Streets without names ==
Roads between cities, and especially highways, are rarely named; they are often numbered instead, but in Graan voor Visch, a district of Hoofddorp, streets have no names. The houses there are instead uniquely numbered with very high numbers, starting with 13000.

In the central district of Mannheim (Germany), it is the blocks which are numbered rather than the streets.

In Costa Rica, most streets do not have names or signs, and directions are given based on landmarks and by blocks, which are counted as 100 meters, regardless of the block's actual size.

== Nicknames and shorthand ==
Some streets are known equally or better by a name other than their official name.

Seattle's University Way NE is almost universally known to locals as "The Ave". Buffalo, New York's Delaware Avenue acquired the nickname of "Presidents Avenue", being where Millard Fillmore lived, William McKinley died, and Theodore Roosevelt was sworn in as president. The best-known segment of South Las Vegas Boulevard is called the Las Vegas Strip, or just "The Strip".

It is also common in some places to shorten the official name of streets which have long names. For example, many streets named for Massachusetts are often referred to as "Mass Ave"; Boston's Commonwealth Avenue is often called "Comm Ave"; Manhattan's Lexington Avenue is often simply called "Lex" and Madison Avenue, "Mad"; Charlottesville, Virginia's Jefferson Park Avenue is simply "JPA"; in Williamsburg, Virginia, Duke of Gloucester Street is often referred to as "DOG Street".

In Chicago, Lake Shore Drive is commonly abbreviated to "LSD". In Portland, Oregon, the Martin Luther King, Junior Boulevard is abbreviated to "MLK Jr. Blvd.", while people in Chicago often refer to Martin Luther King Jr. Drive as "King Drive". Oregonians, when referring to the Tualatin Valley Highway west of Portland, often say and write "TV Highway". In Toronto, the Don Valley Parkway is commonly referred to as the "DVP" (and jocularly the Don Valley Parking Lot due to high congestion).

In Columbus, Ohio, Chittenden Avenue near Ohio State University is often informally referred to as "Chit", reflected in local event names such as "ChitShow" and "ChitFest". In rare cases, highway numbers may be used as shorthand for streets that have (or once had) such a designation, particularly when running through suburban municipalities. An example of this form of shortening is the common reference of Hurontario Street in the Toronto suburb of Mississauga, as "Highway 10".

In Paris, Boulevard Saint-Michel is affectionately known as "Boul'Mich". North Michigan Avenue, Chicago's most famous shopping street, is also occasionally referred to by that name, but is more commonly called the Magnificent Mile.

In Berlin, Kurfürstendamm is also well known as Ku-Damm, while Automobil-Verkehrs- und Übungsstraße, a highway formerly used as a race track, is normally shortened to "AVUS".

== Symbolism ==
Some street names in large cities can become metonyms, and stand for whole types of businesses or ways of life. "Fleet Street" in London still represents the British press, and "Wall Street" in New York City stands for American finance, though the former does not serve its respective industry any more. Also, if a theatrical performance makes it to "Broadway" it is supposed to be a very good show. "Broadway" represents the 41 professional theaters with 500 or more seats located in the Theater District and Lincoln Center along Broadway, in Midtown Manhattan, New York City.

In London, a surgeon with a private practice is liable to be referred to as a Harley Street surgeon even if she or he does not actually maintain an office in Harley Street. Similarly Savile Row is a world-known metonym for bespoke tailoring, while Jermyn Street is associated with high-quality shirtmaking. The cachet of streets like Park Avenue and Fifth Avenue can prove effective branding, as for the Buick Park Avenue luxury car, and Saks Department Store being always known as "Saks Fifth Avenue". Also in New York 42nd Street still carries connotations of pleasure, but also sin and decadence. Like Wall Street, Toronto's Bay Street represents Canadian finance and still serves it today.

Much as streets are often named after the neighborhoods they run through, the reverse process also takes place, with a neighborhood taking its name from a street or an intersection: for example, Wall Street in Manhattan, Knightsbridge in London, Haight-Ashbury in San Francisco, and Jane and Finch in Toronto.

== Street type designations ==
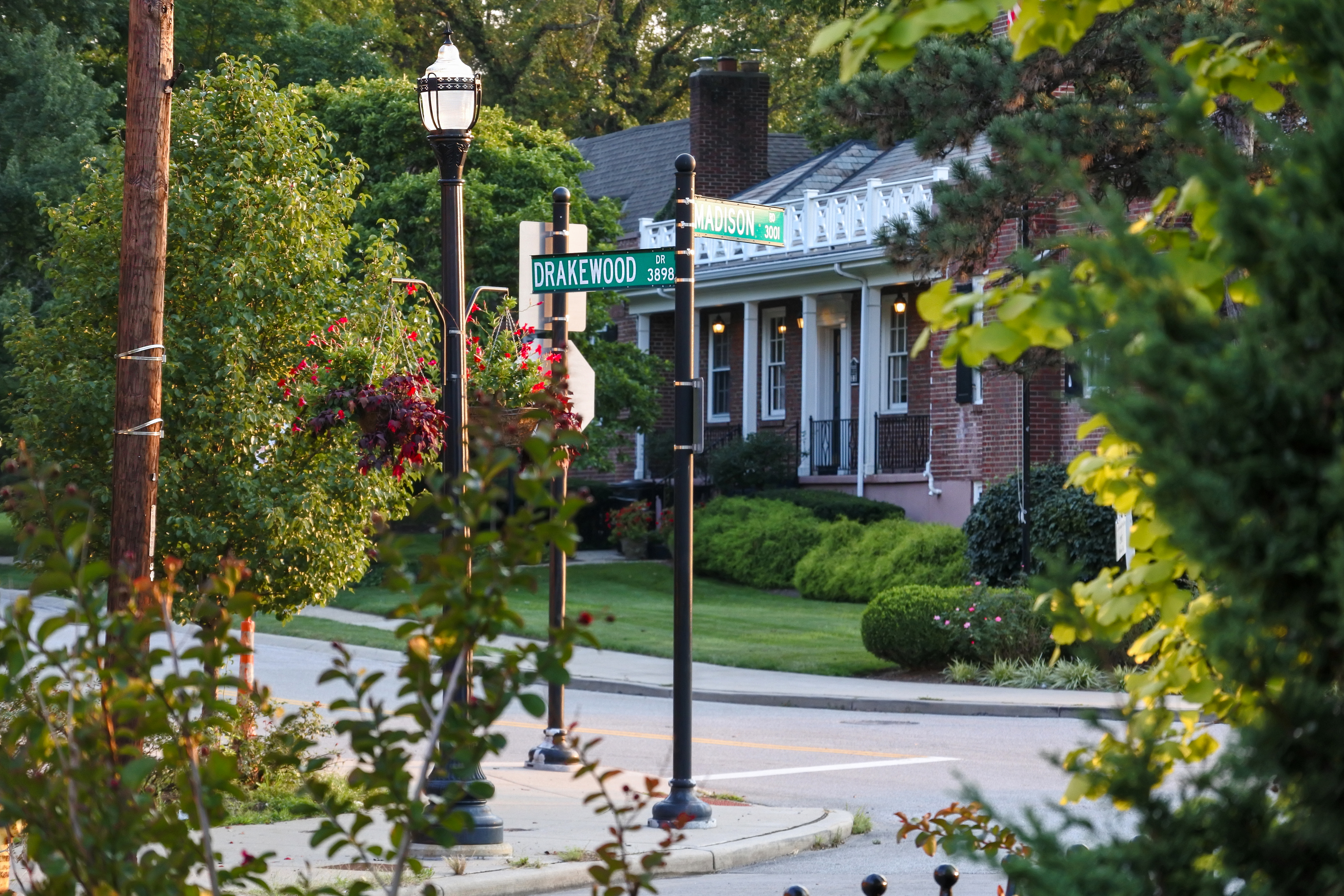
Drakewood Drive in Cincinnati; a "drive" denoting private, residential road

Streets can be divided into various types, each with its own general style of construction and purpose. However, the difference between streets, roads, avenues and the like is often blurred and is not a good indicator of the size, design, or content of the area. Many transportation facilities have a suffix which designates it a "street", "road", "court", etc., and these designations may or may not have any meaning or pattern in the particular jurisdiction.

In the United Kingdom many towns will refer to their main thoroughfare as the High Street, and many of the ways leading off it will be suffixed "Road".

In some other English-speaking countries, such as New Zealand and Australia, cities are often divided by a main "Road", with "Streets" leading from this "Road", or are divided by thoroughfares known either as "Streets" or "Roads", with no apparent differentiation between the two. In Auckland, for example, the main shopping precinct is around Queen Street and Karangahape Road, and the main urban thoroughfare connecting the south of the city to the city centre is Dominion Road.

In the United Kingdom, Australia and New Zealand, some streets are called parades. A parade is a public promenade or roadway with good pedestrian facilities along the side. Examples: Peace Celebration Parade, Marine Parade, King Edward Parade, Oriental Parade and dozens more. However, this term is not used in North America (with the exception of Marine Parade in Santa Cruz, California).

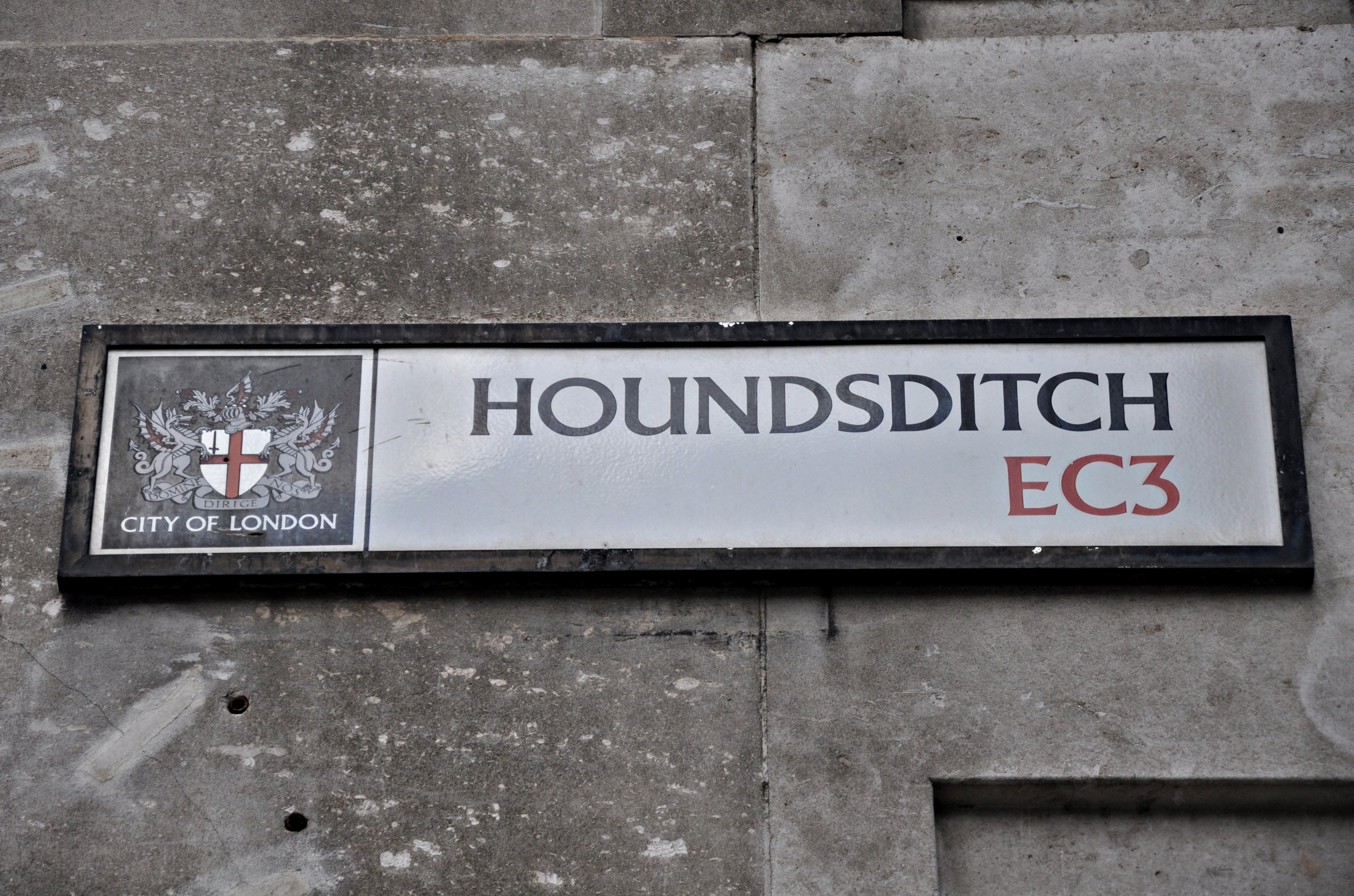
Houndsditch, a street name with no suffix in the City of London

In the City of London, according to tradition, there are no "Roads"; all the streets there are called "Street", "Lane", "Court", "Hill", "Row" or "Alley", or have no suffix (e.g. Cheapside). However, since 1994, part of Goswell Road now lies in the City of London, making this a unique anomaly.

In Manhattan, Portland and the south side of Minneapolis, east–west streets are "Streets", whereas north–south streets are "Avenues". Yet in St. Petersburg, Florida and Memphis, Tennessee, all of the east–west streets are "Avenues" and the north–south streets are "Streets" (Memphis has one exception—the historic Beale Street runs east–west). On the north and northeast side of Minneapolis, the street grids vary.

In North Minneapolis, numbered avenues run east–west (33rd Avenue N) and numbered streets run north–south (6th Street N) but named avenues run north–south (Washburn Avenue N). In Northeast Minneapolis, avenues run east–west (15th Avenue NE) and streets run north–south (Taylor Street NE), except for the major east–west artery Broadway Street and the major north–south avenues Central and University.

In rural Ontario, numbered concession roads form grids oriented to lakes and rivers. Usually each axis of the grid has its own suffix, for example, "Roads" for east–west roads and "Lines" for north–south roads. Some townships have roads with two numbers, e.g. "15/16 Sideroad", which refer to the lot numbers on both sides of the roads.

On sprawling military reservations with tank schools such as Fort Knox Military Reservation and Fort Benning there are dedicated "Tank Roads" and "Cut-offs".

In Montreal, "avenue" (used for major streets in other cities) generally indicates a small, tree-lined, low-traffic residential street. Exceptions exist, such as Park Avenue and Pine Avenue. Both are major thoroughfares in the city.

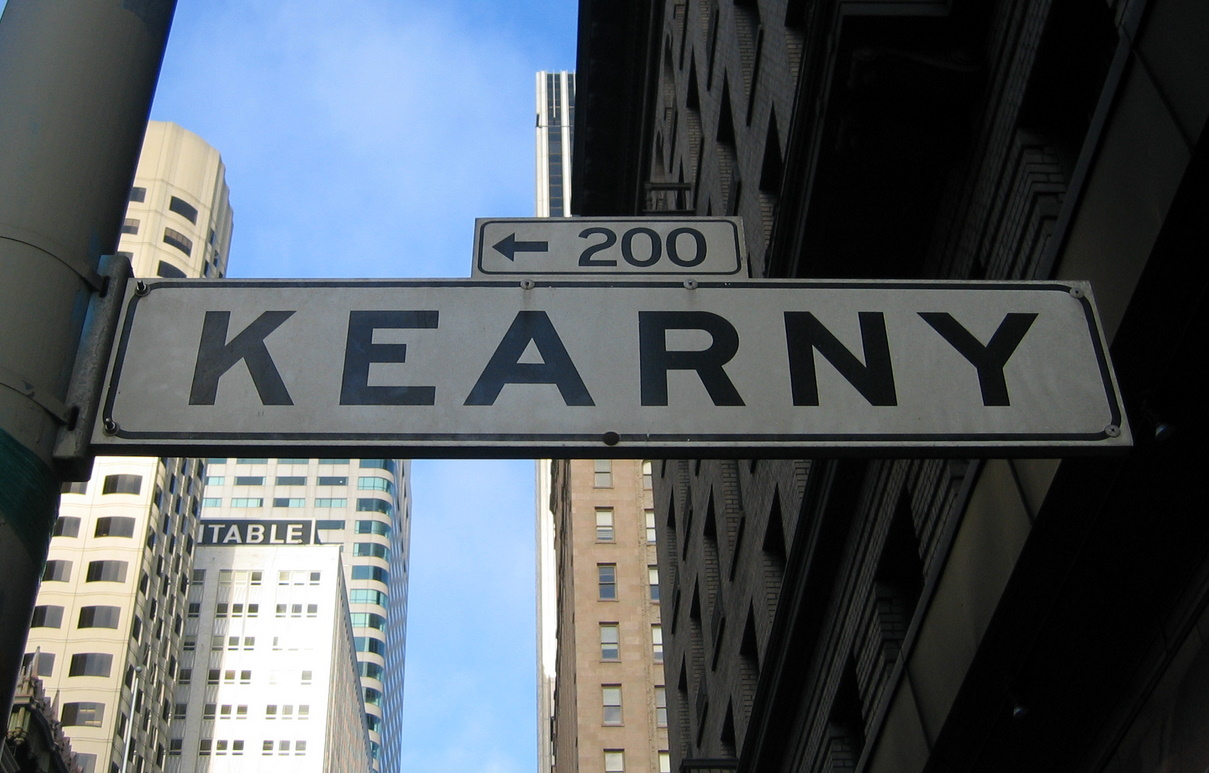
San Francisco: Kearny Street's sign omits "street".

In older British cities, names such as "vale", normally associated with smaller roads, may become attached to major thoroughfares as roads are upgraded (e.g. Roehampton Vale in London).

In the Netherlands in the 1970s and 1980s, there was a trend to not use the street type suffix at all, resulting in street names like "North Sea" and "Tuba" (translated).

In some cities in the United States (San Francisco, Houston, Detroit, Cleveland, and Memphis), streets do have official suffixes, but they are not generally given on street signs or used in postal addresses. San Francisco's streets have unique names throughout the city (except on military forts). There was an effort in 1909 in San Francisco by the mayor-appointed Commission on Change of Street Names to rename duplicate and confusable names, with over 250 street names altered.

Street type designations include:

- Major roads
  - Highway
    - Autobahn
    - Auto-estrada
    - Autoroute
    - Autostrada
    - Autostrasse
    - Bypass
    - Expressway
    - Freeway
    - Motorway
    - Pike/Turnpike
  - Avenue
  - Boulevard
  - Parade
  - Road
  - Street
- Small roads
  - Arcade
  - Alley
  - Bay
  - Branch
  - Brook
  - Burg
  - Byway
  - Camp
  - Center
  - Club
  - Common
  - Corner
  - Course
  - Dale
  - Divide
  - Drive
  - Estate
  - Flat
  - Forge
  - Fork
  - Fort
  - Gardens
  - Gate
  - Gateway
  - Glen
  - Green
  - Grove
  - Harbor
  - Haven
  - Heights
  - Highlands
  - Hollow
  - Key
  - Knoll
  - Landing
  - Lane
  - Light
  - Loaf
  - Lock
  - Lodge
  - Market
  - Manor
  - Meadow
  - Mews
  - Mill
  - Mission
  - Neck
  - Orchard
  - Passage
  - Path
  - Pathway
  - Ranch
  - Rapid
  - Rest
  - Route
  - Rill
  - Row
  - Rue
  - Run
  - Station
  - Terrace
  - Throughway
  - Trace
  - Track
  - Trafficway
  - Trail
  - Trailer
  - Union
  - Vale
  - View
  - Village
  - Villas
  - Ville
  - Vista
  - Walk
  - Wall
  - Way
  - Well
  - Wynd
- Cul-de-sac
  - Close
  - Court
  - Place
  - Cove
- Named for their shape
  - Bend
  - Circle
  - Crescent
  - Diagonal
  - Loop
  - Oval
  - Quadrant
  - Radial
  - Square
- Named for geographical attributes
  - Bayou
  - Beach
  - Bluff
  - Bottom
  - Canyon
  - Cape
  - Cay
  - Causeway
  - Cliff
  - Creek
  - Crest
  - Curve
  - Fall
  - Field
  - Ford
  - Forest
  - Grade
  - Hill
  - Inlet
  - Island
  - Isle
  - Lake
  - Land
  - Mount
  - Mountain
  - Park
  - Parkway
  - Pass
  - Pine
  - Plain
  - Point
  - Prairie
  - Ridge
  - River
  - Shoal
  - Shore
  - Spring
  - Stream
  - Summit
  - Valley
- Named for their function
  - Annex
  - Approach
  - Bridge
  - Bypass
  - Crossing
  - Crossroad
  - Cutoff
  - Dam
  - Esplanade
  - Extension
  - Ferry
  - Frontage road
  - Junction
  - Mall
  - Overpass
  - Parade
  - Park
  - Plaza
  - Port
  - Promenade
  - Quay
  - Ramp
  - Skyway
  - Spur
  - Stravenue
  - Tunnel
  - Underpass
  - Viaduct

== Numbering ==
Some major roads, particularly motorways and freeways, are given road numbers rather than, or in addition to, names. Examples include the E5, M1 and Interstate 5. Many roads in Britain are numbered as part of the Great Britain road numbering scheme, and the same applies in many other countries. The same is also common in the United States; for example, in Washington, D.C., much of New York Avenue is U.S. Route 50. In York Region, Ontario, the former provincial Highway 7 (currently signed as York Regional Road 7) is still referred to as Highway 7 on road signs and in everyday use, even though the road has not been part of Ontario's provincial highway system since 1998.

In the western United States, parts of the old U.S. Route 99 were taken over and added into the respective states' highway system and numbered "99" in the 3 states that the U.S. Route use to run through California, Oregon, and Washington. This is true for several other historic U.S. Routes, such as Route 66.

The opposite is true in Las Vegas, Nevada. The western loop of the Bruce Woodbury Beltway (between the two Interstate 15 connectors) have been numbered Clark County Route 215. This is in anticipation of the route being renumbered Interstate 215

Some jurisdictions may use internal numbers to track county or city roads which display no number on signs.

In most cities, attempts were made to match addresses with the areas between numbered street. For example, addresses on Main street, between 3rd and 4th street would be in the 300's

== Signage ==
Most streets have a street name sign or nameplate at each intersection to indicate the name of the road. The design and style of the sign is usually common to the district in which it appears. The sign has the street name and sometimes other information, such as the block number and/or its community, and any highway designation. Such signs are often the target of simple vandalism, and signs on unusually or famously named streets are especially liable to street sign theft.

Usually, the colour scheme used on the sign just reflects the local standard (white on a green background in many U.S. jurisdictions, for example). However, in some cases, the colour of a sign can provide information, as well. One example can be found in Minneapolis, Minnesota. Within city limits, all major arterial roads use a blue sign, north–south roads use a green sign, and east–west roads use a brown sign. In New York, historical districts use white lettering on brown signs. Other places sometimes use blue or white signs to indicate private roads.

Most of Europe uses white on a blue background.

== Statistics ==
The most common street names in the United States, as of 1993, are:

1. Second or 2nd (10,866)
2. Third (10,131)
3. First (9,898)
4. Fourth (9,190)
5. Park (8,926)
6. Fifth (8,186)
7. Main (7,644)
8. Sixth (7,283)
9. Oak (6,946)
10. Seventh (6,377)
11. Pine (6,170)
12. Maple (6,103)
13. Cedar (5,644)
14. Eighth (5,524)
15. Elm (5,233)
16. View (5,202)
17. Washington (4,974)
18. Ninth (4,908)
19. Lake (4,901)
20. Hill (4,877)

The reason for "Second" and "Third" streets being more common than "First" is that some cities do not have "First" streets — naming them "Main" or "Front" (in communities with river, lake or railroad line frontage) instead, or renaming them after historical figures.

== See also ==
- Numbered street
- Odonymy in France
- Road designation

== Sources ==
- Room, Adrian (1996). An Alphabetical Guide to the Language of Name Studies. Lanham and London: The Scarecrow Press. ISBN 9780810831698.
- David Leighton, azstarnet.com, Arizona Daily Star, Jan. 08, 2013.
