= Hazel Park, Michigan =

- City
- City of Hazel Park
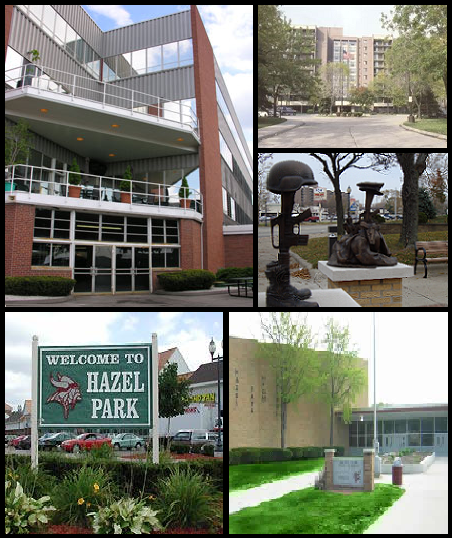
- Pictured left to right: The Hazel Park Racetrack, the Hazelcrest Apartments, the Monument to the Fallen Heroes at city hall, Hazel Park Welcome Sign in Downtown, and Hazel Park High School
- Motto: "The Friendly City"
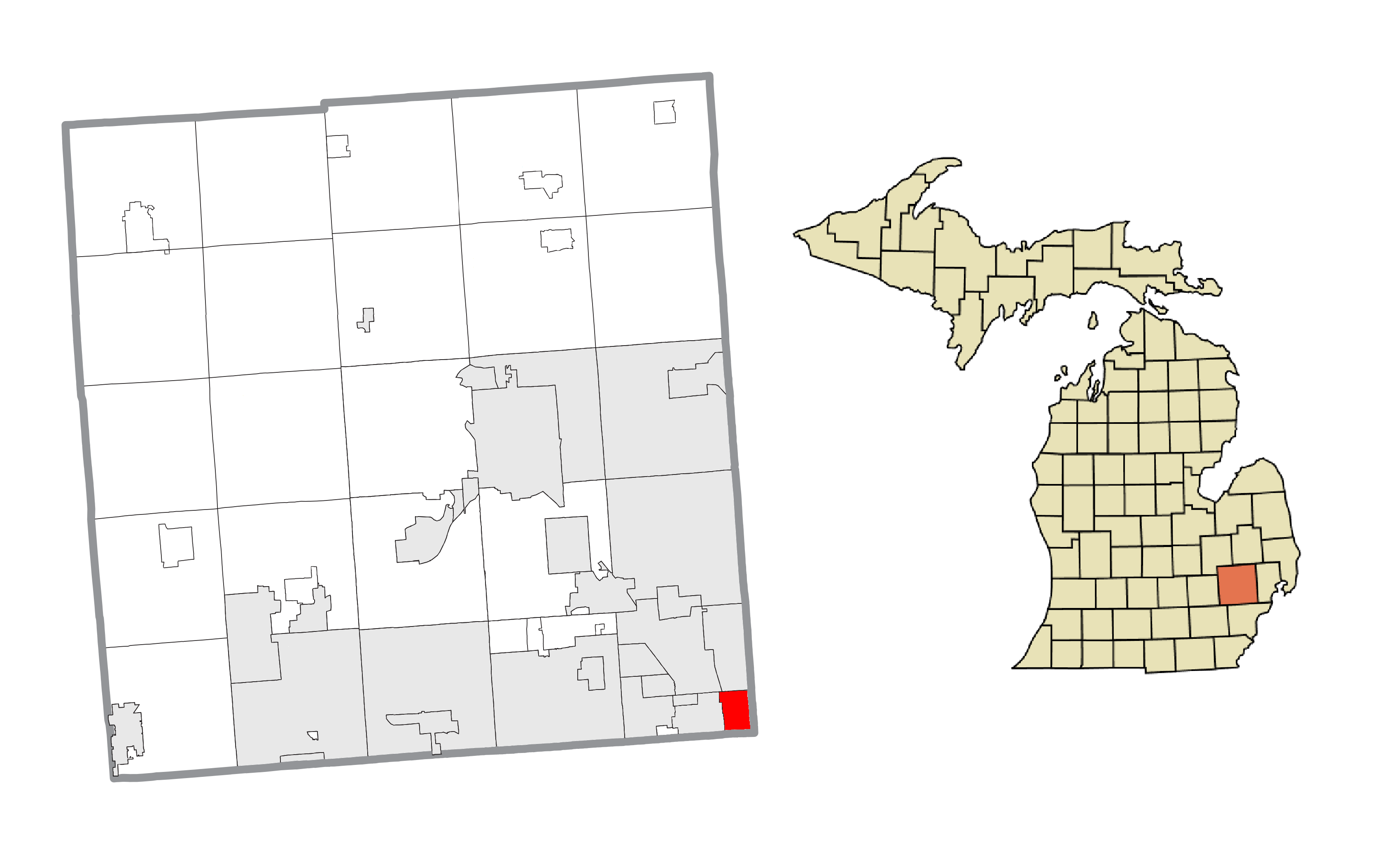
- Location within Oakland County

- Location within the state of Michigan
- Coordinates: 42°27′45″N 83°06′15″W
- Country: United States
- State: Michigan
- County: Oakland
- Incorporated: 1941

Government
  - Type: Council–manager
  - Mayor: Michael Webb
  - Manager: Edward Klobucher

Area
  - City: 2.82 sq mi (7.30 km^{2})
  - Land: 2.82 sq mi (7.30 km^{2})
  - Water: 0 sq mi (0.00 km^{2})
- Elevation: 630 ft (192 m)

Population (2020)
  - City: 14,983
  - Density: 5,316.9/sq mi (2,052.87/km^{2})
  - Metro: 4,296,250 (Metro Detroit)
- Time zone: UTC-5 (EST)
  - Summer (DST): UTC-4 (EDT)
- ZIP code(s): 48030
- Area codes: 248 and 947
- FIPS code: 26-37420
- GNIS feature ID: 0628016
- Website: Official website

Hazel Park is a city in Oakland County in the U.S. state of Michigan. An inner-ring suburb of Detroit, Hazel Park borders Detroit to the north, roughly 10 miles (16.1 km) north of downtown Detroit. As of the 2020 census, the city had a population of 14,983.

Hazel Park was incorporated as a city in 1941 and bills itself as The Friendly City. From 1949 to 2018, it was the site of the Hazel Park Raceway, considered a high-quality facility originally used for both Thoroughbred and Standardbred racing. From 1985 on, the track ran only harness races. After 1996, it also provided simulcasts of races year round from across North America, with betting allowed on these races at the track facilities.

== History ==
This area was long occupied by indigenous peoples, with such historic and current tribes as the Potawatomi and others known to European fur traders and colonists from the 17th century.

In the later 19th century, as westward migration increased from the eastern United States to the Great Lakes territories, this area was settled by European Americans. They first developed it for agriculture. In October 1882, a group of farmers gathered to organize the community's first school. They built a one-room school in 1883 and later expanded it to two rooms. In 1884, John W. Benjamine petitioned the state of Michigan to form a school district from Royal Oak Township. Benjamine, who was School Inspector for Royal Oak Township, named it Hazel Park School District 8, after the abundant hazelnut bushes in the area.

In 1920, the Thomas W. Lacey School, was built on present-day Woodruff Avenue. The first Hazel Park school had been sold to Frank Neusius, who used it as a barber shop and neighborhood grocery.

Given a rapid increase in this period of the number of school-age children as population grew, the school district soon added four grade schools. It built a larger building at the central location, also called the Lacey School. This became the site for high school students. With further postwar population growth, Hazel Park High School was built. The former high school at John R and 9 Mile Roads was used as Lacey Junior High School.

Hazel Park's growth was stimulated by the expansion of jobs at the Ford Motor Company, based in nearby Highland Park. Hospitals, offices and shops were developed in the area of 9 Mile Road. The electric Stephenson Line was a convenient way for commuters to travel by trolley to Highland Park and Detroit. In 1924, Hazel Park installed its first traffic light, was granted a post office, and established a Deputy Sheriff's office. The city was incorporated in 1941.

During the 1930s and 1940s, rallies and community events helped the city during the Great Depression and the years of World War II. Large parts of the auto industry were converted to production of defense-related goods, and thousands of people migrated into the area for new jobs. After the city's incorporation, it improved the infrastructure and provided running water to all areas.

In 1942, the Elias Brothers, John, Fred and Louis Elias, established a diner in Hazel Park. The Dixie Drive-In was one of the first in the Midwest to offer curbside services. In 1952, the diner was franchised as a Big Boy restaurant. Louis Elias was elected as Mayor of Hazel Park, serving two terms from 1953 to 1961. The Elias brothers continued to open Big Boy restaurants throughout the Metro Detroit area and in 1983 purchased the franchiser.

With the return of thousands of soldiers from World War II, housing demand was very high in the area. It stimulated a boom in construction. Many of the current bungalows in the city were built shortly after the war.

Hazel Park Raceway opened for thoroughbred horse racing in 1949. It was considered a state-of-the-art facility. Harness racing was added in 1953. In 1950 the Detroit Race Course opened in Livonia, Michigan, to the north of Detroit, offering competition with both flat and harness racing. In 1996 the state legislature approved onsite betting at racetracks for simulcast events, and the track was opened year round for patrons to view on racing events from across North America. In 2018 the profitable Hazel Park track was closed after being sold. The new owner wanted to use the large property to develop new warehouse space for an Amazon distribution center.

In 1966 the Interstate 75 (I-75) freeway was fully completed through Hazel Park, as part of the postwar highway construction subsidized by the federal government. It superseded Stephenson Highway, now used as a service drive. Similarly, I-696 was constructed through the neighboring city of Madison Heights in 1979; it joins the two freeways and creating a busy junction with I-75, part of which extends into Hazel Park's north end.

== Architecture ==
Hazel Park is dominated by domestic architecture of the post-World War II era. Many of the city's houses were built in the Cape Cod bungalow style, shortly after World War Two, and have a second story encompassed in the home's roofing.

Michigan bungalows are also common in the city. These houses were originally built during the 1920s and 1930s and can often be found near the downtown area.

Ranch houses became a popular style, and were builtin the northern neighborhoods during the late 1950s and early 1960s. Older ranch houses were often built with aluminum siding, whereas newer ones, such as the ones built in the Courts, were built in brick or stone.

Front split-level and side split-level houses are not common in the city. However, back split houses - split-levels with the second story built into the back - are common in the southern portion of the city near the 8 Mile border. This style of home is often the result of additions built onto one-story bungalows and ranch houses.

Colonial houses are more rare in the city, but are scattered throughout different neighborhoods. These houses are often built in brick and usually resemble urban Tudor houses. Some are built in stone, often more common north of 9 Mile Road. Others are built in the Traditional Tudor style.

New development homes are extremely common in the city. They can be seen on many blocks of Hazel Park, and often range from two-story snout houses to detached single-family brownstones. Many of these houses are built in the Neo-eclectic style.

=== Neighborhoods ===
Residential areas make up the majority of the city and are in most cases located in sub-divisions located off main roads. Hazel Park was originally laid out in a grid from 1900 to 1925. East-west streets ran from Dequindre Road to Hilton Road on the western edge of the city (now the independent city of Ferndale); and north-south streets ran from Nine Mile Road to Woodward Heights Boulevard.

While largely retained, the grid has also been modified through the decades. Dead-end streets became increasingly common in the northeast area of the city after the construction of Karam Park and Longfellow Elementary school, which cut off the streets stemming from Vassar Avenue north of Woodward Heights Boulevard. Other dead-end streets occur at the borders of the properties for Webster Elementary, Ford Elementary, and Saint Justin's Catholic Church.

== Economy ==
The business districts developed along the city's main thoroughfares. Hazel Park's central business district (CBD) developed around the intersection of John R. Road and Nine Mile Road. This CBD contains the city's municipal buildings, two shopping centers, and a high-rise apartment complex. The first Harmony House music store opened in Hazel Park's Central Business District in 1947.

John R. Road serves as the main small business thoroughfare; the majority of the road is zoned for local business use. Small shopping centers, office parks, and sidewalk access stores are characteristic of the John R. corridor through the city. Nine Mile Road has a more suburban assortment of businesses, many of which are restaurants, churches, and slightly larger shopping centers. Eight Mile Road, Dequindre Road, and Ten Mile Road are also well-traveled, industry-related thoroughfares.

== Government ==
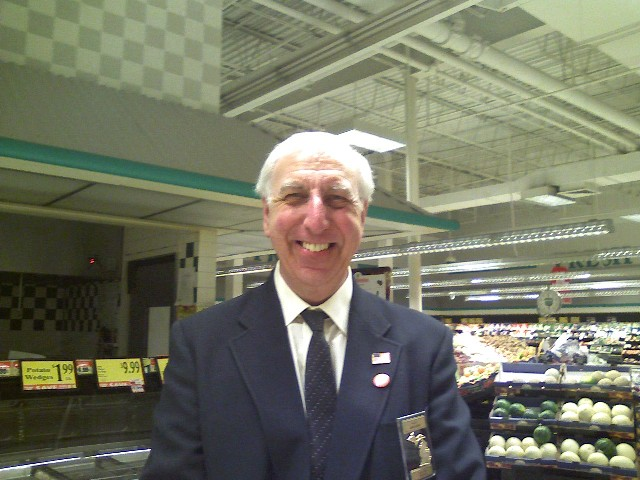
Jack Lloyd, mayor of Hazel Park from 2002 to 2014

Hazel Park has a Council-Manager form of government. It is governed by an elected City Council consisting of a mayor and four council members. The city council appoints a City Manager, who manages the day-to-day operations of the city. The current mayor of Hazel Park is Michael Webb, who succeeded Jeffrey Keeton. Jan Parisi, the city's first woman mayor, resigned in 2016 due to health-and family-related reasons.

Current city council members are Alissa Sullivan, who also serves as Mayor Pro Tem, Andy LeCureaux, Luke Londo, and Mike McFall. The current city manager is Edward Klobucher. City government is located on the same block as the public library, police station, and post office, at 9 Mile Road and John R Road.

The Hazel Park Police Department has a force of 42 full-time police officers. The department has auxiliary policing and neighborhood watch programs available to citizens ages 21 and over. The police department offers programs such as gun lock giveaways, house watch programs, and programs to put a child up for adoption in case the parent is not capable of raising the child.

=== Federal, state, and county legislators ===
United States House of Representatives
District	Representative	Party	Since
11th	Haley Stevens	Democratic	2023 (Note: Stevens has represented the 11th district since 2019, but the district has only included Hazel Park since 2023.)

Michigan Senate
District	Senator	Party	Since
3rd	Stephanie Chang	Democratic	2023

Michigan House of Representatives
District	Representative	Party	Since
8th	Mike McFall	Democratic	2023

Oakland County Board of Commissioners
District	Commissioner	Party	Since
3	Ann Erickson Gault	Democratic	2023

== Geography ==
According to the United States Census Bureau, the city has a total area of 2.82 square miles (7.30 km^{2}), all land.

Hazel Park is adjacent to the cities of Detroit to the south, Ferndale to the west, Royal Oak to the northwest, Madison Heights to the north, and Warren to the east. The city is bordered by 10 Mile Road to the north, I-696 at its northwest corner, Dequindre Road (the Oakland-Macomb county line) to the east, 8 Mile Road (M-102) to the south, and West End Street, Pilgrim Avenue, and Lenox Street to the west.

== Demographics ==
Historical population
Census	Pop.	Note	%±
1950	17,770		—
1960	25,631		44.2%
1970	23,784		−7.2%
1980	20,914		−12.1%
1990	20,051		−4.1%
2000	18,963		−5.4%
2010	16,422		−13.4%
2020	14,983		−8.8%

=== Income and poverty ===
Historical median household income
Year	$	±%
1990	35,667	—
1997	39,118	+9.7%
2000	37,045	−5.3%
2005	38,300	+3.4%
2007	39,783	+3.9%
2009	40,403	+1.6%

The median income for a household in the city in 2008 was $40,403, and the median income for a family was $49,448. The per capita income for the city was $19,390. About 10.0% of families and 12.4% of the population were below the poverty line, including 17.0% of those under age 18 and 7.6% of those age 65 or older.

=== 2020 census ===
As of the 2020 census, Hazel Park had a population of 14,983. The median age was 37.1 years. 16.6% of residents were under the age of 18 and 13.5% of residents were 65 years of age or older. For every 100 females, there were 102.3 males, and for every 100 females age 18 and over, there were 102.1 males age 18 and over.

All residents lived in urban areas, and none lived in rural areas.

There were 6,889 households in Hazel Park, of which 20.4% had children under the age of 18 living in them. Of all households, 26.9% were married-couple households, 29.1% were households with a male householder and no spouse or partner present, and 32.4% were households with a female householder and no spouse or partner present. About 37.4% of all households were made up of individuals and 11.5% had someone living alone who was 65 years of age or older.

There were 7,449 housing units, of which 7.5% were vacant. The homeowner vacancy rate was 2.9% and the rental vacancy rate was 6.7%.

Racial composition as of the 2020 census
Race	Number	Percent
White	11,335	75.7%
Black or African American	1,851	12.4%
American Indian and Alaska Native	76	0.5%
Asian	245	1.6%
Native Hawaiian and Other Pacific Islander	1	0.0%
Some other race	160	1.1%
Two or more races	1,315	8.8%
Hispanic or Latino (of any race)	654	4.4%

=== 2010 census ===
As of the census of 2010, there were 16,422 people, 6,641 households, and 3,999 families residing in the city. The population density was 5,823.4 inhabitants per square mile (2,248.4/km^{2}). There were 7,611 housing units at an average density of 2,698.9 per square mile (1,042.1/km^{2}). The racial makeup of the city was 85.8% White, 6.8% African American, 0.9% Native American, 0.5% Asian, 0.4% from other races, and 4.6% from two or more races. Hispanic or Latino residents of any race were 2.7% of the population.

There were 6,641 households, of which 31.8% had children under the age of 18 living with them, 33.7% were married couples living together, 18.9% had a female householder with no husband present, 7.6% had a male householder with no wife present, and 39.8% were non-families. 32.2% of all households were made up of individuals, and 11.3% had someone living alone who was 65 years of age or older. The average household size was 2.47 and the average family size was 3.13.

The median age in the city was 36.1 years. 24.2% of residents were under the age of 18; 9.3% were between the ages of 18 and 24; 29.5% were from 25 to 44; 25.6% were from 45 to 64; and 11.3% were 65 years of age or older. The gender makeup of the city was 49.4% male and 50.6% female.

=== 2000 census ===
In 2000, there were 7,284 households, out of which 33.4% had children under the age of 18 living with them, 41.6% were married couples living together, 16.1% had a female householder with no husband present, and 35.9% were non-families. 28.4% of all households were made up of individuals, and 11.1% had someone living alone who was 65 years of age or older. The average household size was 2.60 and the average family size was 3.21.

In the city, 27.7% of the population was under the age of 18, 9.5% was from 18 to 24, 33.2% from 25 to 44, 18.1% from 45 to 64, and 11.5% was 65 years of age or older. The median age was 33 years. For every 100 females, there were 97.3 males. For every 100 females age 18 and over, there were 94.0 males.

73.1% of all households in Hazel Park were family households. 20.9% of all households were married couple families with children. 10.6% were single-mother families.

The census reported the city as 81.1% White, 9.7% African American, 0.90% Native American, 1.5% Asian, 0.90% from other races, and 4.20% from two or more races. Hispanic or Latino residents of any race were 2.7% of the population.

The top reported ancestries in the city were German (18.6%), Irish (14.8%), Polish (10.3%), English (9.7%), French (6.0%) and Italian (4.1%) Italian. French Canadians (3.6%), Scottish (3%), Arab (2.5%) and Dutch (1.6%). The city has the second-largest proportion of Native American residents in Oakland County, after Keego Harbor.

In 2000, 7.2% of Hazel Park citizens were foreign born. 9.7% reported speaking a language other than English.

As of the 2000 Census, the median income for a household in the city was $37,045, and the median income for a family was $43,584. Males had a median income of $33,063 versus $24,362 for females. The per capita income for the city was $16,723.

== Education ==
=== Primary and secondary schools ===
The city is served by the Hazel Park School District, which has some establishments in Ferndale, a neighboring city. There are three elementary schools operating in the city of Hazel Park.

The northern portion of the city is served by Webb Elementary, while the southern portion is served by United Oaks Elementary and Hoover Elementary. Multiple other elementary schools once operated in the city, including Roosevelt, Lee O. Clark, Longfellow, Henry Ford, Webster, and Edison Elementaries. Webster was closed as an elementary school at the end of the 2014 school year, but remains open for the Preschool program. Lee O. Clark has since been demolished, and Henry Ford has been converted into the School District Administration Building. Henry Ford also serves as an alternative education facility for students K-8 called Advantage, and a program called Breakfast Club for high school students. There is one high school and one middle school operating in Hazel Park. Hazel Park has followed a recent trend in Metro Detroit suburbs by the consolidation of its middle schools. Formerly, two separate schools, Webb Junior High and Beecher Middle School, operated in the city. Webb was converted to an elementary school in 2004, and Beecher was torn down and re-built, commissioned as Hazel Park Junior High.

High schools in Hazel Park began with the construction of Lacey High School in 1920 and Hazel Park High School in 1929. Lacey High was demolished in the early 1960s, and the Hazel Park High School was re-commissioned as Howard Beecher Junior High. In 1961, a new high school was built in the eastern portion of the city, taking the name of Hazel Park High School.

Jardon Vocational School is also in operation in order to separate students in special education from the mainstream curriculum and serves as a high school. The school operates mainly in the Hazel Park-Ferndale-Pleasant Ridge area, but also serves the rest of Oakland County, especially the south east.

The high school had an average score of 10.3 on the state's MEAP test in 2011. This was one of the lowest scores in Oakland County.

== Notable people ==
- Connor Barwin, NFL defensive end; born in Southfield and grew up in Hazel Park
- Steve Fraser, 1984 Olympic wrestling gold medalist, coached at the University of Michigan
- James R. Fouts, former mayor of Warren, Michigan; father served as Hazel Park City Manager
- Myles Jury, UFC featherweight contender
- Archie McCardell, CEO of International Harvester 1977-82
- Shane Morris, quarterback for Warren De La Salle and the University of Michigan
- Joe Roa, MLB pitcher for Cleveland Indians and Minnesota Twins
- Jack Scott, Canadian-born singer who grew up in Hazel Park
- Terry Thomas, graduate of Hazel Park High School, drafted by the Detroit Pistons in 1975
- Bill Virdon, MLB outfielder and manager for several teams; 1955 National League Rookie of the Year and 1960 World Series champion; born in Hazel Park
- Bob Welch, pitcher for Los Angeles Dodgers and Oakland Athletics, NL and AL All-Star, 1990 AL Cy Young Award winner with the A's, pitching coach for Arizona Diamondbacks, 1974 graduate of Hazel Park High School
- Robert Wyland, known for his mural paintings of whales and dolphins, attended Hoover Elementary School, which has a Wyland mural in its library

== Hazel Park in popular culture ==
- Scenes in the movie Youth in Revolt were filmed in and around Hazel Park.
- Two novels, Band Fags! (2008) and Drama Queers! (2009), written by Hazel Park native Frank Anthony Polito, take place in Hazel Park during the 1980s. Both books feature key scenes set at Hazel Park High School. Polito released his latest novel also set in Hazel Park during 2012 and 1994 called Lost in the '90s. The book was released in April 2012 from Polito's own imprint, Woodward Avenue Books.

== Transportation ==
- I-75 (Chrysler Freeway) provides a connection to neighboring cities such as Royal Oak and Detroit and other major cities in the United States
- I-696 (Walter P. Reuther Freeway) is a major thoroughfare near the city
- John R. Road provides access to Detroit, Madison Heights and the Oakland Mall
- Dequindre Road provides access to Warren, Sterling Heights, Detroit and Universal Mall
- M-102 (8 Mile Road) provides access to the former site of the Michigan State Fair, Detroit, Warren, Ferndale and other communities in Oakland, Macomb and Wayne counties.
