= Odonymy in France =

Study of road names in France

This article deals with the conventions and uses of odonymy in France.

== History ==
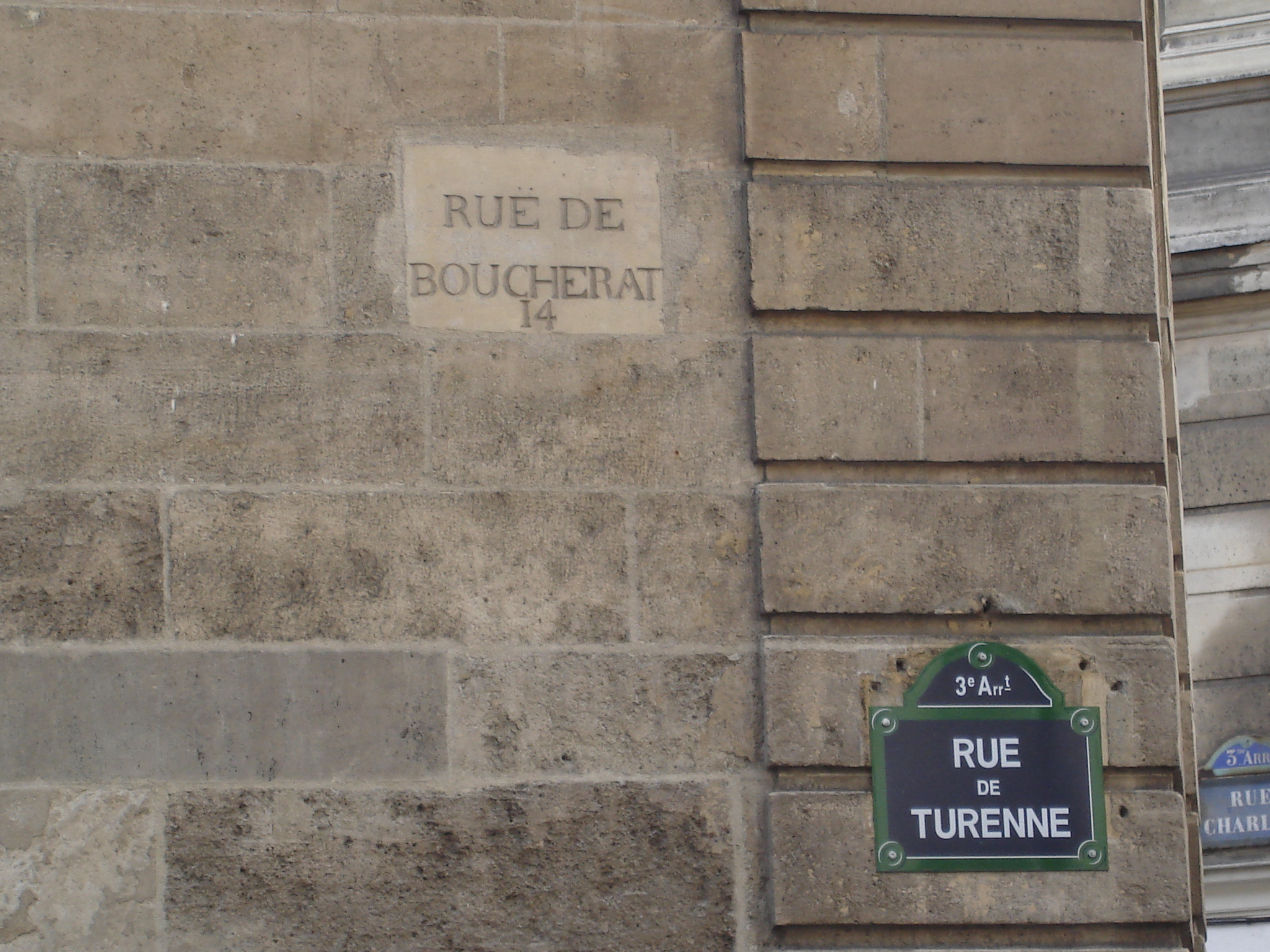
Corner of rue de Turenne in the 3 ^{th} district of Paris: the plaque mentions the current street name, while its former name - Street Boucherat - is still visible, carved in stone of the building.

It is possible to distinguish several eras where we observe a similar typology of street names on French territory:

=== Middle ages ===
At the end of the 13th century, with the expansion and population of cities like Paris, the need is felt to separate the houses from each other. The names respond at this time to a functional logic. The name of the road is that of the place it serves, this place being religious ("place de l'Eglise", "rue des Capucins") or civil ("place du marché", "rue des Bouchers", often names in reference to the trades which are grouped together in a street which takes the name or "houses where the sign hangs"), and so on.

From 1600, on an idea of the Duke of Sully, the streets adopted names that had no direct connection with the designated place, while their name gradually became a public and royal monopoly: according to researcher Dominique Badariotti, the latter "is therefore exercised as best it can, functioning better in Paris than in the provinces and valuing the powerful of the kingdom or regional notables"

== Statistics ==
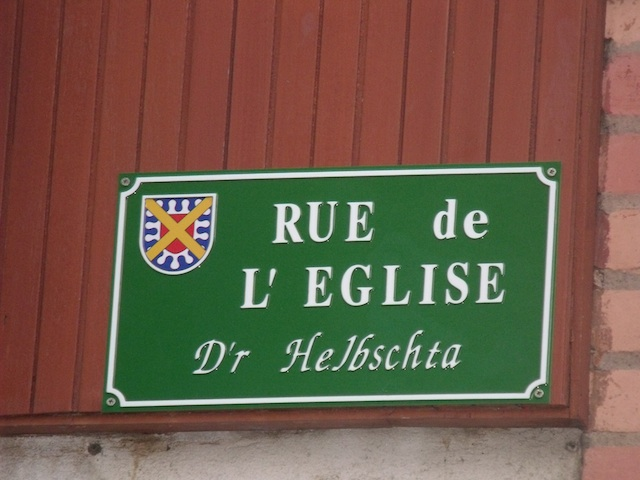
Rue de l'Église, Ensisheim.

=== Occurrences ===
In 2016 in France, the following 15 odonyms are the most frequently cited on street maps.

Most common odonyms in France in 2009
| # | Road in French | Road in English | Occurrences |
|---|---|---|---|
| 1 | Rue de l'Église | Church Street | 7,965 |
| 2 | Place de l'Église | Church Square | 5,755 |
| 3 | Grande Rue, Grand-Rue | Great Street | 3,943 |
| 4 | Rue du Moulin | Mill Street | 3,566 |
| 5 | Place de la Mairie | Town Hall Square | 3,430 |
| 6 | Rue du Château | Castle Street | 2,963 |
| 7 | Rue des Écoles | Schools Street | 2,779 |
| 8 | Rue de la Gare | Station Street | 2,771 |
| 9 | Rue de la Mairie | Town Hall Street | 2,672 |
| 10 | Rue Principale | Main Street | 2,452 |
| 11 | Rue du Stade | Stadium Street | 2,421 |
| 12 | Rue de la Fontaine | Fountain Street | 2,346 |
| 13 | Rue Pasteur | Pasteur Street | 2,020 |
| 14 | Rue des Jardins | Gardens Street | 1,755 |
| 15 | Rue Victor-Hugo | Victor Hugo Street | 1,621 |

=== Dates ===
Several odonyms recalling important dates in the history of France also approach or exceed a thousand occurrences, if we combine the types of roads and the spelling variants; among others:

- 19 March (-1962) - End of the Algerian War
- 8 May - Victory in Europe Day
- 14 July - Bastille Day
- 4 September - 4 September 1870, the date Napoleon III fell and the Third French Republic was proclaimed.
- 11 November - Armistice of 11 November 1918
- 8 May - 8 May 1945, armistice of May 1945
- Liberation - differs in each town

== Terms ==
- Cul de sac

== See also ==
- Street name
