= Hazel Park Raceway =

Horse racing track located in Hazel Park, Michigan, open from 1949 - 2018

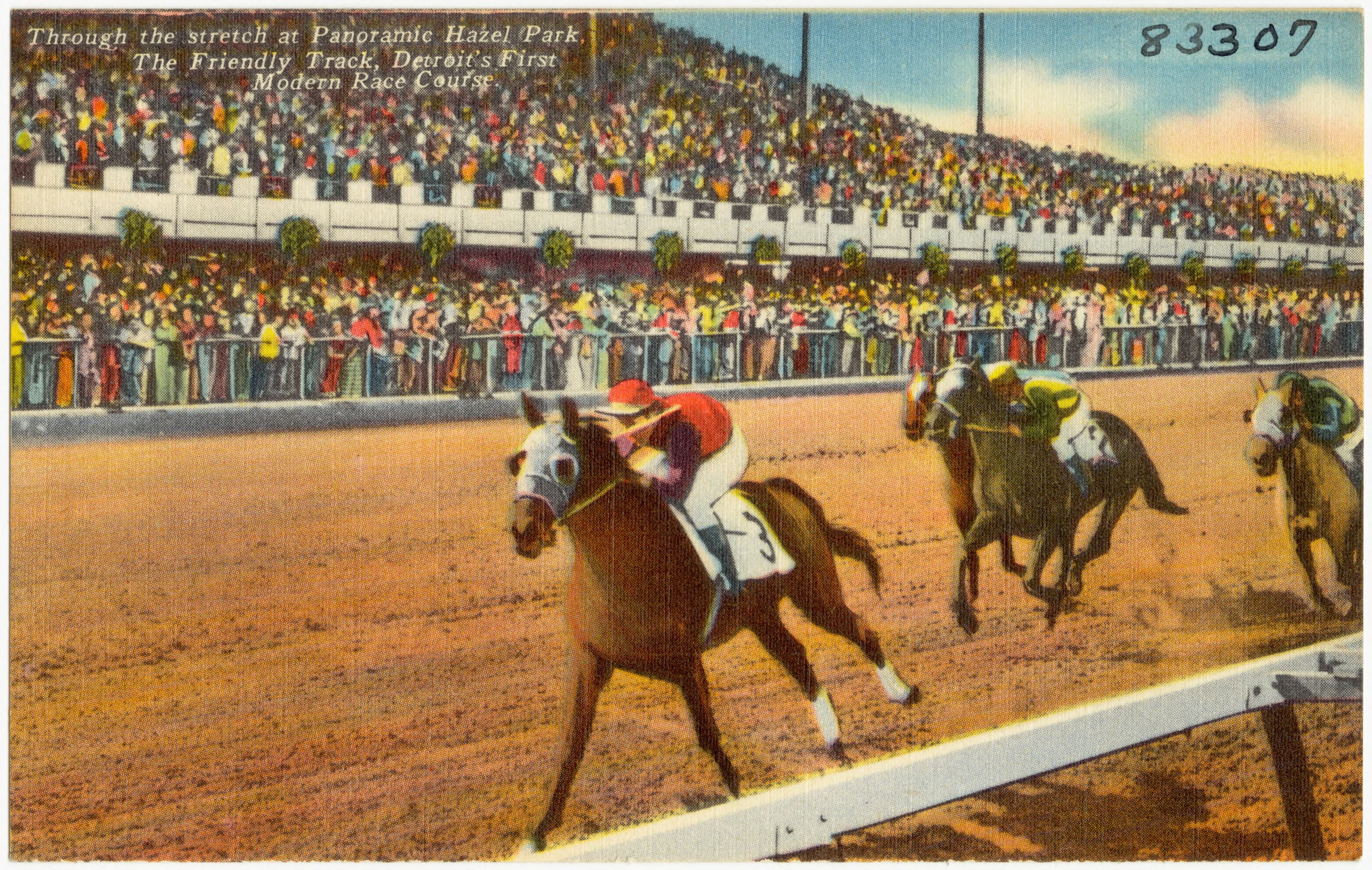
- Interactive map of Hazel Park Raceway
- Location: Hazel Park, Michigan
- Coordinates: 42°28′25″N 83°05′11″W
- Owned by: Hartman & Tyner
- Date opened: 1949
- Date closed: 2018
- Capacity: 3,500
- Race type: Thoroughbred racing

Hazel Park Raceway, located in Hazel Park, Michigan, in the metropolitan Detroit area, was a horse race track. From 1949 it offered live thoroughbred racing every Friday and Saturday night May through mid-September, and also offered harness racing. Beginning in 1996, it offered simulcast wagering seven days a week all year long on thoroughbred and harness races from across the US and Canada. Admission and parking were free. For a period, this was the only track in Michigan to offer live thoroughbred racing.

The track opened in 1949 for Thoroughbred flat racing. In 1953 a harness racing season was added. After 1985, only Standardbred harness racing events were run here until 2014, when Thoroughbred racing was revived. The track was sold and closed in April 2018, leaving Northville Downs as the only horse racing track in Michigan. It would later close in 2024. In 2021 an Amazon distribution center opened on the former site of the raceway.

Under the ownership of Bernard Hartman and Herbert Tyner, owners of Hartman and Tyner Inc., in 2009 Hazel Park generated roughly $550,000 in revenue for the City of Hazel Park.

== History ==
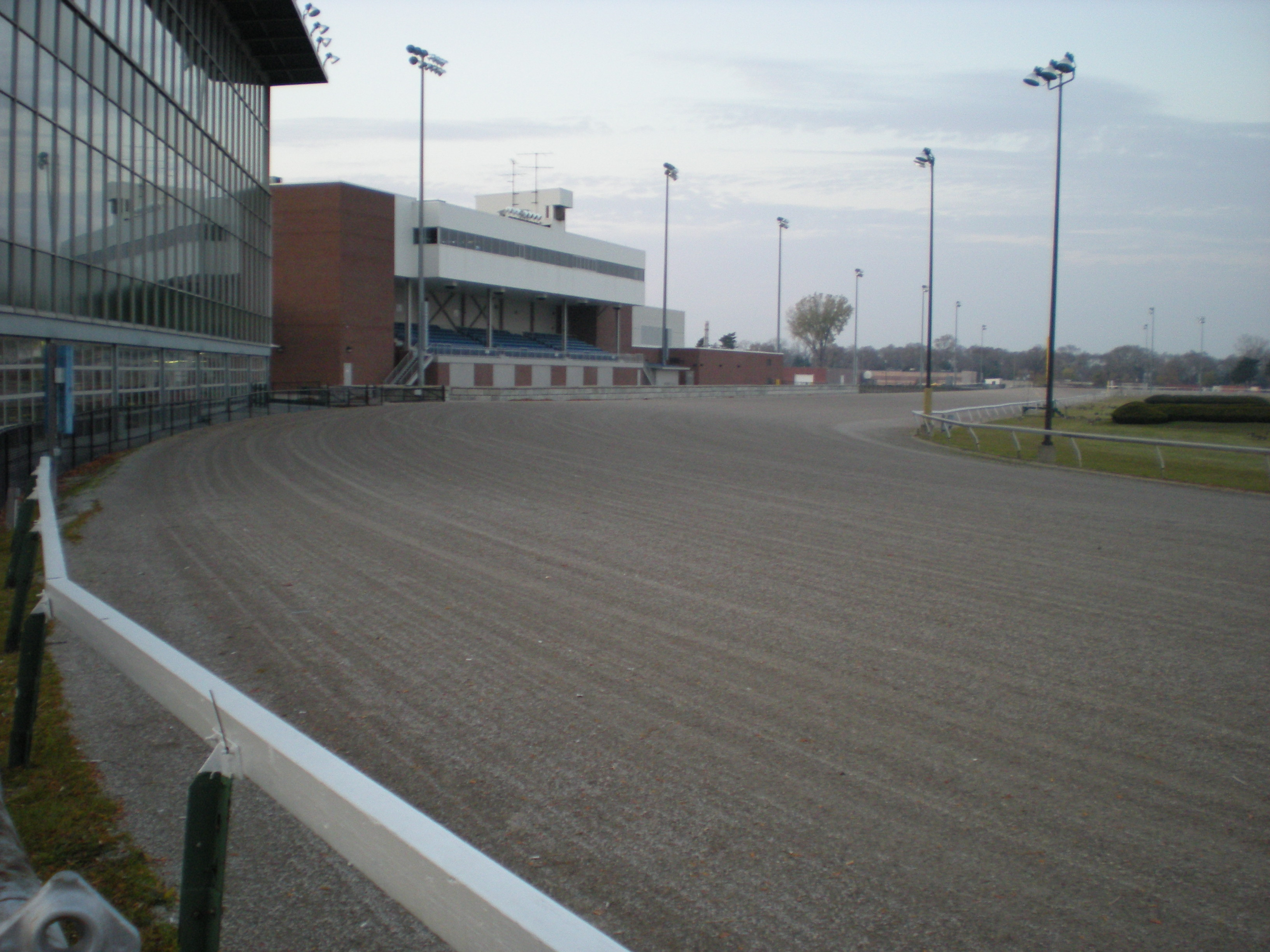
The 5/8-mile track was the first in the nation of this length.

In the late 1940s a group of auto racing enthusiasts purchased 140 acres of landfill property on the Southwest corner of 10 Mile Road and Dequindre Road to build an auto racing track in Hazel Park. Construction began on the 5/8-mile track, but it was halted because of financial troubles with the project.

A successful area businessman, Richard Connell, with a love for horse racing purchased the property from the defunct auto racing enterprise. Samuel "Dayton" Matkin, a race car driver, had suggested that the track could be converted to horse racing. (Matkin, one of the founders of the course, would serve at various times as Racing Official, Timer, and Barn Superintendent.)

In the early summer of 1949, with the race track already in place, the Hazel Park Raceway worked to convert the facility to a horse racing venue, and constructed stables and related facilities. Hazel Park Raceway opened its doors on August 17, 1949, with its first thoroughbred meet. The first harness meet was held in the spring of 1953. The track was maintained as a dual-breed facility (Thoroughbred and Standardbred) from 1949 through 1984.

From 1985 to May 2014, Hazel Park ran only live harness racing events. In 1996 the state legislature passed a law to authorize three casinos in Detroit. It also approved expanding betting opportunities at tracks, by authorizing betting for simulcast events.

Hazel Park Raceway began offering live simulcast wagering year-round, 7 days a week, on thoroughbred and harness races from across the US and Canada. Patrons could bet on races from North America's major race tracks in the simulcast lounges located on the 2nd, 3rd and 4th floors of the clubhouse. Attendees could bet on the biggest races in North America, including the Triple Crown of flat racing: the Kentucky Derby, Preakness, and Belmont; and the Breeder's Cup, and major harness races such as the Hambletonian and Little Brown Jug.

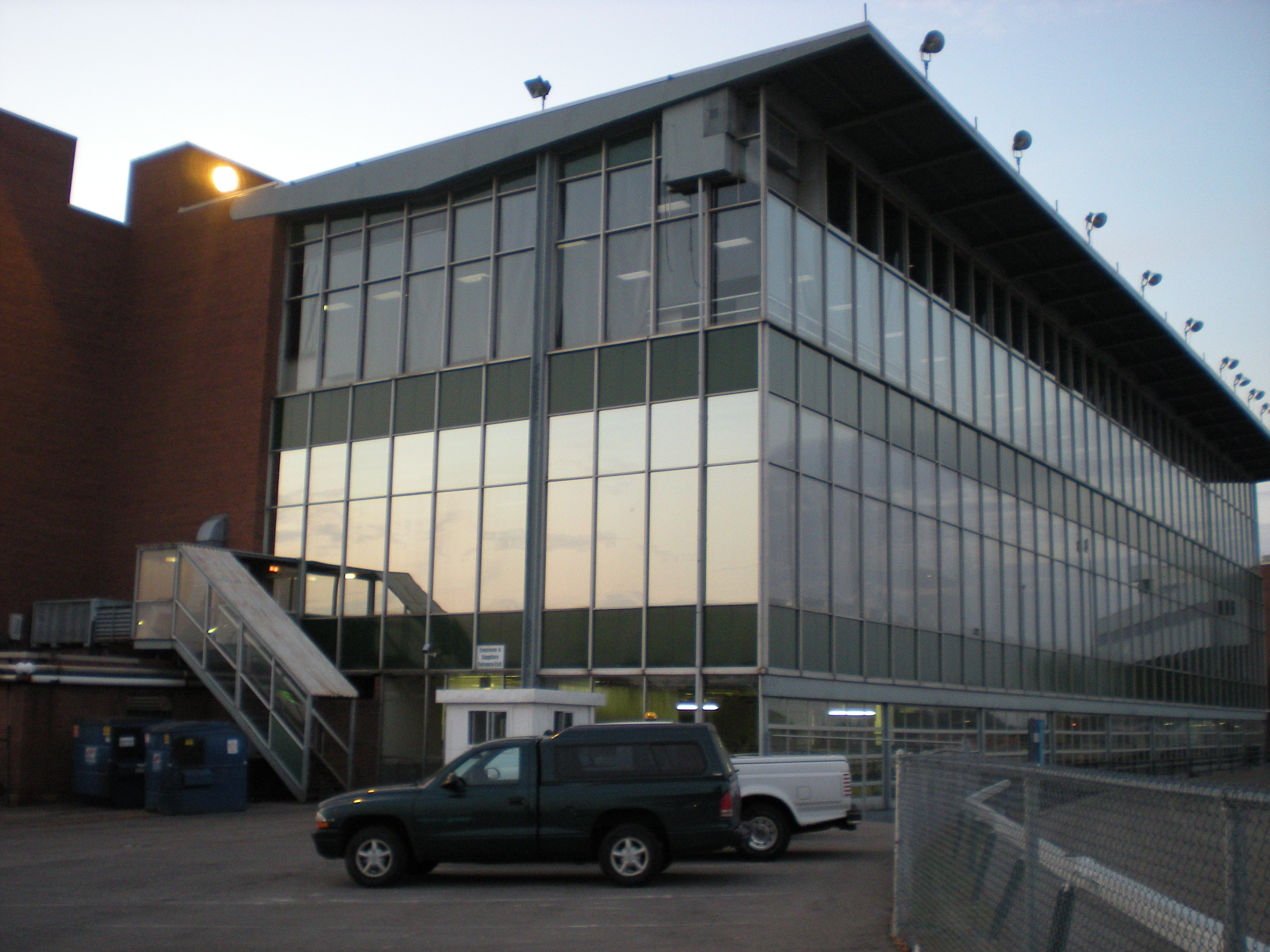
The main building hosted simulcast races, the dining room, and the Top of the Park Grill.

In 2004 Hazel Park Raceway replaced its old grandstands with a new 40,000-square foot, multi-million-dollar structure that included modern grandstands, a press box, and a gaming facility. Plans for a gaming facility, which would have included slot machines, were put on hold indefinitely pending needed legislation.

The grandstands were home to Action On The Apron, a party atmosphere with an outdoor bar and live band. Patrons can get close and personal views of the horses and racing. The clubhouse was renovated throughout the years. Patrons could view the track from the dining room located in the Clubhouse on the first turn. In addition to the dining room and many concession stands, the owners added the Top of The Park Grill located on the 4th floor of the Clubhouse.

During live racing (May–September), food was available from concession stands, the Top of The Park Grill, or the Clubhouse dining room. On simulcast days, food and beverages were available at the concession stand on the 3rd floor or the Top of The Park Grill.

In 2014 the racetrack reintroduced Thoroughbred flat racing, in an effort to attract younger patrons. To prepare, it invested "approximately $250,000 in a new racing surface;" the soft, sandy loam had a limestone base, considered "ideal for thoroughbred horses." Thoroughbred racing was operated through the season of 2018. Together with the year-round simulcast schedule, the racetrack had profitable operations. But that year the track was sold and racing ended.

=== Stable fire ===
In June 1987, a fire broke out at the Hazel Park Harness Raceway, killing 15 of the 26 horses in the stable. The average value of the horses was approximately $15,000 each. The fire started in a housing barn located about 500 yards from the grandstand, while races were still being held. The fire was contained after 30 minutes of burning; the origin of the fire is unknown.

== Sale and closure ==
After the racetrack was sold to Ashley Capital in 2018, late that year demolition began. The site of the racetrack now boasts an Amazon distribution center.

== Special events ==
=== Annual fireworks ===
In honor of Independence Day and Labor Day, fireworks were annually set off at the Hazel Park Raceway for public viewing. This was usually done after the last race of the evening.
