= Rhiwlas =

Rhiwlas may refer to:

- Rhiwlas, Llanddeiniolen, Gwynedd, Wales, United Kingdom
- Rhiwlas, Llandderfel, Gwynedd, Wales, United Kingdom
- Rhiwlas, Powys, Wales, United Kingdom
