= Harmony House (music retailer) =

Music retailer

- Industry: Retail
- Founded: 1947
- Founder: Carl Thom
- Defunct: 2002
- Headquarters: Hazel Park, Michigan, U.S.
- Number of locations: 38
- Area served: Metro Detroit
- Products: Albums
- Owner: Bill Thom
- Number of employees: 400

Harmony House was an American music retailer founded in the Detroit suburb of Hazel Park, Michigan in 1947. The chain once operated 38 stores, primarily within the Metro Detroit area, and employed more than 400 people. Although most of the stores ceased operations in 2002, a location in Berkley remained until 2004 when it was converted to an f.y.e. music store.

== History ==
Carl Thom founded Harmony House in Hazel Park, Michigan in 1947. The first store was a Hallmark Cards dealer which also sold albums and musical equipment, but by the 1960s, the store was mostly selling albums. Starting in the 1970s, the chain began expanding with several more stores in the Metro Detroit area. Thom sold the business to his son, Bill, in 1991. Harmony House was known for its support of the local independent music scene, as well as the presence of a Ticketmaster outlet in each store.

At its peak in 1999, the Harmony House chain comprised 38 stores, of which all but two were within the state of Michigan, and it employed 400 people. The majority of its stores were 2,000 square feet (190 m^{2}) to 8,000 square feet (740 m^{2}) in size and located in neighborhood shopping centers and strip malls, although the chain also operated larger-format stores in indoor shopping malls.

Rounds of closures began in the early 2000s, when seventeen stores were shuttered. Eleven more closed by August 2002, and the last ten were to have closed by year's end. The decision to close the stores was a result of the increased presence of music sold at big-box stores such as Best Buy and Wal-Mart, as well as an increase in Internet piracy. The announcement was later amended when Bill Thom decided to keep open the chain's flagship store in Berkley and a nearby store in Royal Oak that specialized in classical music. Royal Oak's store closed in September 2003, and the Berkley store was sold in 2004 to Trans World Entertainment, which rebranded it as an f.y.e. store. Much of the Harmony House decor remained intact until the rebranded f.y.e. store was closed for good in 2019.
