= Mile road system =

A mile road system is a system of naming roads by their mile distance from a baseline. Implementations include:

- Mile Road System (Michigan), used throughout the state of Michigan
  - The roads and freeways in metropolitan Detroit include a large mile road system
- Mile Road System (Cincinnati), with the mouth of the Little Miami River as the baseline

== See also ==
- Street or road name
  - Street or road name#Grid-based naming systems
