= Peter Barnes (pilot) =

British helicopter pilot (1962–2013)

- Born: 1962; Nottingham
- Died: 16 January 2013; London
- Cause of death: Aircraft mid-air collision with a construction crane
- Known for: Great North Air Ambulance Service rescue

Peter Barnes (1962 – 16 January 2013) was a British commercial helicopter pilot. He was killed on 16 January 2013 when the AgustaWestland AW109 helicopter he was flying collided with a construction crane in central London.

== Life and career ==
Born in Nottingham, Barnes was educated at the independent Oakham School in Rutland, before attending the University of Derby to study business and marketing. He worked as a ski instructor following his graduation, before taking a position in the advertising industry. Taking up a role at Glenair Helicopters he was part of a team responsible for the inspection of power lines in Scotland and Northern Ireland. He joined RotorMotion as a contract pilot in 1997, working for them until 2011. During that time he provided traffic and travel news for the Newcastle-based radio station Metro FM, and piloted aircraft for the Great North Air Ambulance Service. As a rescue pilot he was honoured with an award for outstanding courage and skill for his part in the rescue of a motorist from a swollen river in 2004. During his career he was also employed by the organisers of the 2012 Summer Olympics, and played roles in monitoring both the America’s Cup yachting race and the F1 Powerboat World Championship.

As well as his role as a contract pilot, Barnes began to employ his aviation skills for filmwork, and started his own business which he named Helivision Ltd. His professional skills were utilised for a number of film and television productions, including Saving Private Ryan, Die Another Day, and for the BBC documentary series Coast. Based at the Redhill Aerodrome in Surrey he also undertook work for BBC News and Sky News, and was hired to fly a number of prominent people.

== Death ==
Shortly before 08:00 GMT on 16 January 2013, Barnes was killed after the Agusta AW109 he was piloting was in collision with the jib of a construction crane attached to St George Wharf Tower in Vauxhall, central London. The impact sent the helicopter plunging towards the ground, where it exploded, killing Barnes and a pedestrian. A further thirteen people were injured. Barnes, who had been en route from Redhill to Elstree to collect a passenger, was flying across London in low clouds and freezing temperatures, and had asked Air Traffic Control for a change of route and permission to land at the London Heliport in Battersea. The Air Accidents Investigation Branch announced an inquiry into the incident, while David Cameron said there would be a review into the rules governing helicopter flights over central London. The crash was the first fatal helicopter crash in central London since records began in 1976. A report published by the Air Accidents Investigation Branch on 23 January indicated the client Barnes was to collect had expressed concerns about the weather and twice suggested he delay take-off, but Barnes had already started his engines.

The inquest into their deaths found that "their deaths were accidental and the pilot's decision to fly was unsafe".
