= Ebitimi =

- Gender: Unisex
- Language: Ijaw

Origin
- Language: Bayelsa State
- Origin: Southern Nigeria
- Meaning: Remain blessed

Ebitimi is a given name. Notable people with the name include:

- Ebitimi Agogu (born 1987), Nigerian footballer
- Ebitimi Banigo (fl. 1976), Nigerian banker
