= Christopher Collett =

British accountant and politician

Sir Christopher Collett GBE JP
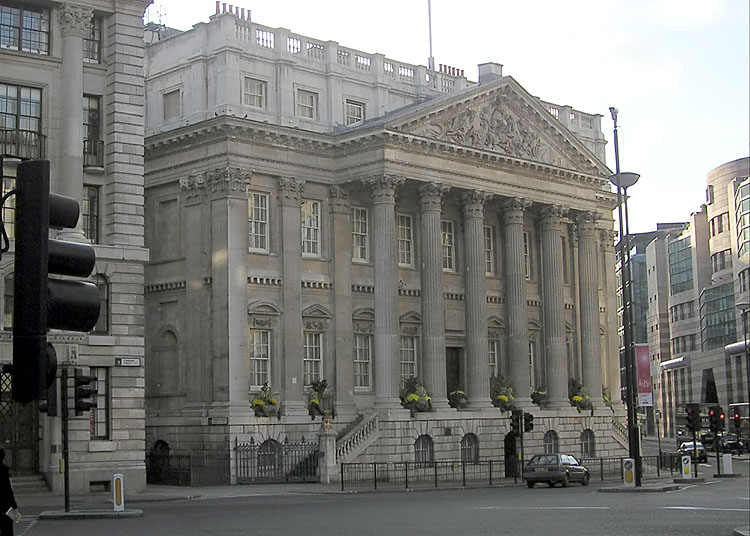
- Mansion House, London, Lord Mayor Collett's official residence

661st Lord Mayor of London
- In office 1988–1989
- Preceded by: Sir Greville Spratt
- Succeeded by: Sir Hugh Bidwell

Personal details
- Born: 10 June 1931 Bromley, Kent
- Died: 2 December 2012 (aged 81) Petworth, Sussex
- Occupation: Chartered accountant

Sir Christopher Collett GBE, JP, FCA (10 June 1931 – 2 December 2012), was a founding partner in Ernst & Young, who served as Lord Mayor of London for 1988/89.

== Background ==
The younger son of Sir Henry Collett and Ruth née Hatch, he was educated at Harrow before going up to Emmanuel College, Cambridge (MA, 1960).

Commissioned into the Royal Artillery for National Service, Collett then served in the Territorial Army being promoted Captain, and later on the City of London TAVR Committee (1980-92).

== Career ==
Articled with Cassleton Elliott & Co. in 1954, qualifying ACA in 1958 (elected FCA 1969), in 1963 Collett was made a partner of Arthur Young, becoming Ernst & Young.

Elected as Common Councilman for Broad Street Ward (1973–79), then Alderman (1979–2001) and appointed a JP, Collett served as Aldermanic Sheriff of London for 1985/86 and one of HM Lieutenants for the City of London, 1988–2001.

Master Glover for 1981/82, Sir Christopher was also Third Warden (then Honorary Assistant) of the Haberdashers' Company, and an Assistant to the Chartered Accountants in England and Wales’ Co.

== Family ==
In remainder to the family baronetcy created for his grandfather, Lord Mayor of London for 1933/34, his elder brother David Collett (1924–62) married Sheila Scott (later Lady Miskin), having a son and a daughter, of whom Sir Ian Collett FIIMS (born 1953), succeeded as the 3rd and present baronet, upon the death of their father, Sir Henry Collett, 2nd Baronet (1893–1971).

Married in 1959 to Anne Griffiths (sister of John Calvert Griffiths CMG KC), Sir Christopher and Lady Collett had two sons and a daughter:

- Alastair Collett (born 1961), LLB (Londin), Master Glover (2024/25), married 1992 Tiana Peck, having two sons.
- Angus Collett (born 1964), MA (Cantab), FCA, married 2005 Rachel Beale.
- Alexandra Collett (born 1972), married 2003 Simon Bailey.

== Honours ==
- Knight Grand Cross, Order of the British Empire, 1988
- Knight of Justice, Order of St John of Jerusalem, 1988
- Order of Merit (cl. II), Qatar, 1985
- Order of Civil Merit (cl. II), Spain, 1986
- Commander, Order of Merit, Germany, 1986
- Commander, Order of the Niger, 1989

=== Arms ===
Coat of arms of Sir Christopher Collett

Crest
A Demi-Hind Proper collared Or resting the sinister foot on an Escutcheon Or charged with a Maul Sable
Helm
That of a Knight
Escutcheon
Azure on a Chevron couped Or between three Hinds trippant Proper collared of the Second an Arch Sable between two open Books also Proper
Motto
Keep Straight On
Orders
The Badge of St John behind the Shield, surrounded by the Circlet of the Order of the British Empire:
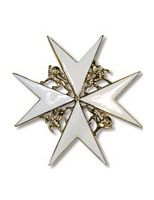
;
Other elements
As Lord Mayor, Collett could impale the City of London arms (dexter) with his family arms (sinister), and likewise as Master Glover, he impaled the Glovers' arms (dexter)
