= Vauxhall helicopter crash =

2013 aviation accident in London

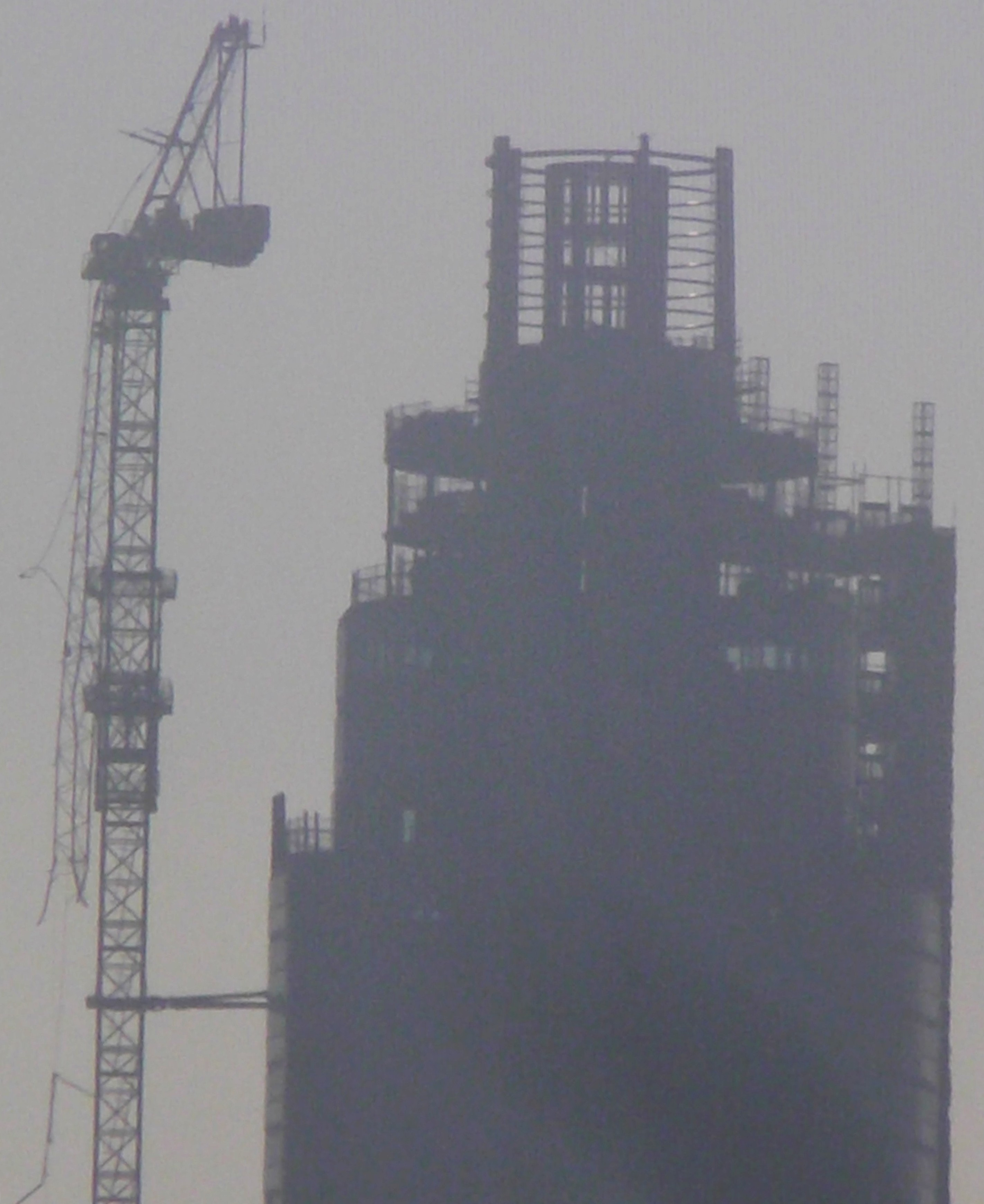
- The damaged crane attached to St George Wharf Tower as seen on the day of the crash

Accident
- Date: 16 January 2013
- Summary: Collision with obstacle in poor visibility
- Site: Vauxhall, London, England; 51°28′57″N 0°7′38.5″W
- Total fatalities: 2
- Total injuries: 12

Aircraft
- Aircraft type: Agusta A109E
- Operator: RotorMotion
- ICAO flight No.: RKT2
- Call sign: ROCKET 2
- Registration: G-CRST
- Flight origin: Redhill Aerodrome, Surrey, England
- Destination: Elstree Airfield, Hertfordshire, England
- Occupants: 1
- Crew: 1
- Fatalities: 1
- Survivors: 0

Ground casualties
- Ground fatalities: 1
- Ground injuries: 12

On 16 January 2013, an Agusta A109 helicopter crashed in Vauxhall, London, after it collided with the jib of a construction crane attached to St George Wharf Tower. Two people died in the incident: the pilot, Pete Barnes, and a pedestrian, Matthew Wood. Five people were taken to hospital and seven more were treated at the scene.

The pilot had diverted because of poor visibility. The official report concluded he was probably unaware how close the tower was, and that the deaths were accidental.

Barnes was an experienced helicopter pilot, flying commercially for many years – including having experience with the Great North Air Ambulance Service.

== History of the flight ==
Barnes had been en route from Redhill Aerodrome to Elstree Airfield to collect a passenger, businessman Richard Caring, and then fly onwards to Yorkshire. Before the pilot had taken off, Caring called him twice on his mobile phone to suggest either delaying or cancelling the flight. However, Barnes chose to proceed with the flight across London, in low cloud and freezing temperatures. After being unable to land at Elstree at 07:46, whilst returning south to Redhill, Barnes had asked Air Traffic Control at 07:56 for a change of route and permission to land at the London Heliport in Battersea.

== Accident ==
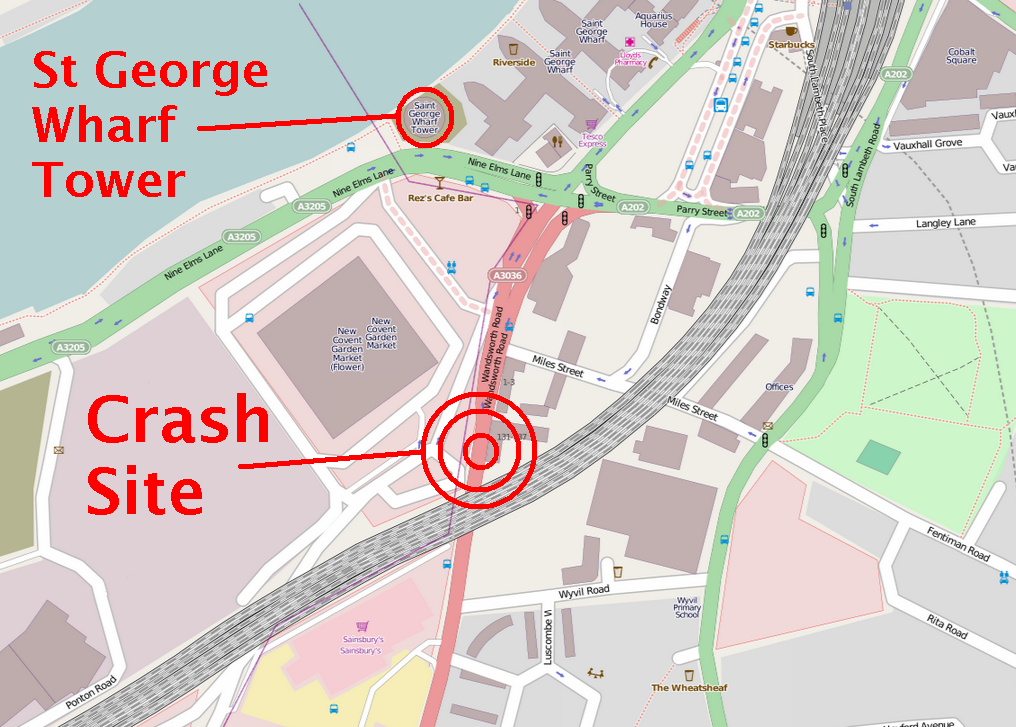
Crash site

At 07:59 GMT, the helicopter collided with the jib of a construction crane attached to St George Wharf Tower in Vauxhall. The existence of the crane was subject to a Notice to Airmen (NOTAM),^{[Note 1]} but the investigators were unable to ascertain whether or not the pilot was aware of the NOTAM. Although the pilot would have seen the building when he previously flew in to Battersea, it was not on the database of the GPS system in use in the helicopter, as that had not been updated since May 2012. The impact sent the helicopter plunging towards the ground, where it caught fire, killing the pilot and pedestrian Matthew Wood.

The BBC reported that the crash happened "in heavy mist". The location of the incident was near Vauxhall bus station, where eyewitnesses reported seeing a "ball of flame". An eyewitness told the BBC that he had heard a "very unusual buzzing sound" just after 08:00.

== Aircraft ==
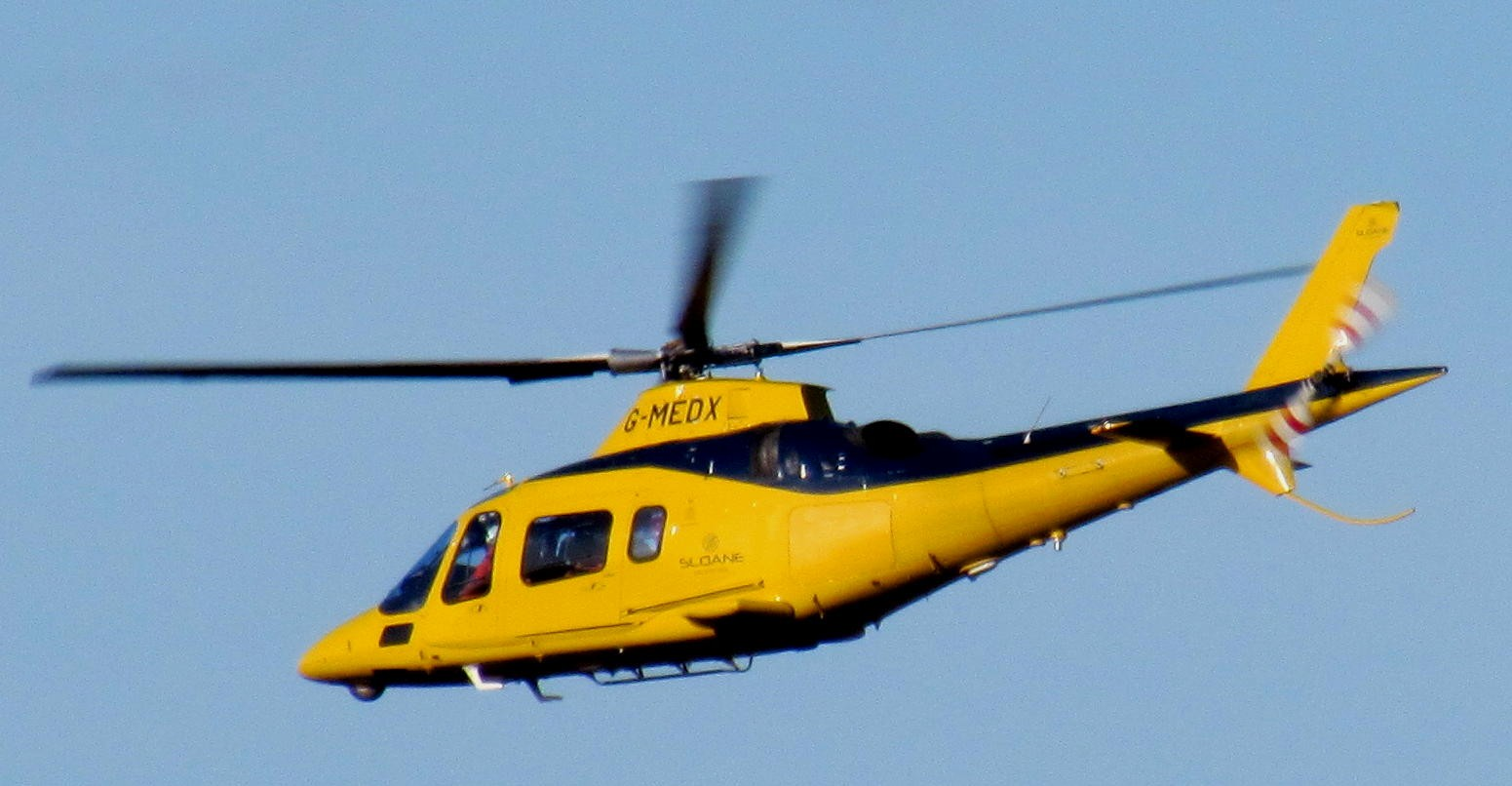
An Agusta A109E similar to the helicopter involved in the accident

The helicopter involved was an Agusta A109E with the registration G-CRST. At the time of the accident, it had flown for 2,304.5 hours. The helicopter was owned by Castle Air of Cornwall and leased to RotorMotion of Redhill, Surrey.

== Emergency response ==
The main wreckage landed in Wandsworth Road, in front of the Wendle Court building. Five people were taken to hospital and seven more were treated at the scene.

The London Fire Brigade said that they had rescued one person from a burning car and that two office buildings, five cars and two motorbikes were damaged as the helicopter crashed to the ground. The scene of the wreckage itself was attended by 88 fire brigade personnel who extinguished the blaze within 20 minutes, while a further 57 worked to make the damaged crane safe and to help evacuate residents from the tower.

The London Heliport contacted the Royal National Lifeboat Institution after having been unable to make contact with the helicopter. An inshore rescue boat from Tower Lifeboat Station was scrambled, as well as the London Heliport's own fire and rescue service after reports of people in the water, but was later recalled. A fireboat also conducted a precautionary search of the river.

== Aftermath ==
Vauxhall station was closed in the aftermath of the incident but reopened the following day. Road users were still advised to avoid the area. ITV News reported that First Capital Connect warned passengers against travelling in the area, though the station was at the time actually served by South West Trains and London Underground.

Vauxhall bus station took five days to fully reopen. Nine Elms Lane remained closed so that a Terex TC 2800-1 lattice boom truck crane (one of the biggest mobile cranes in the country), brought down from Leyland, Lancashire, could be used to remove the jib of the damaged Terex CTL 180 crane. The work was completed by 11 February, with all roads reopened.

== Reactions ==
On the day of the crash, Prime Minister David Cameron said that there would be a review of the rules governing helicopter flights over central London. Similarly, Boris Johnson, the Mayor of London, announced a review of the regulations concerning flying in central London and the safety of tall buildings.

Kate Hoey, the Labour Member of Parliament for the Vauxhall constituency, told the BBC that, in her opinion, there should be an "inquiry into the increasing numbers of helicopters flying around London". In 1991, she had tabled a Ten Minute Rule Bill to tighten the rules on helicopter and heliport legislation, although the bill was not successful in becoming law.

== Investigation ==
The Air Accidents Investigation Branch (AAIB), the body responsible for air accident investigation in the UK, announced an inquiry into the incident. The Civil Aviation Authority announced that the crash was the first fatal helicopter crash in central London since records began in 1976.

A preliminary report published by the AAIB on 23 January indicated that Caring, the client Barnes was to collect, had expressed concerns about the weather and twice suggested he delay take-off. But Barnes stated that he had already started his engine, and chose to proceed with the flight across London in weather later described by the Met Office as prone to widespread low cloud, poor visibility and patches of freezing fog. After being unable to land at Elstree at 07:46, Barnes decided to return to Redhill. After being put under radar control, having entered the London CTR at 07:55, at 07:56 Barnes asked ATC for clearance to divert to the London Heliport. The ATC controller placed Barnes in a hold over the River Thames between Vauxhall Bridge and Westminster Bridge, while checking with controllers at Battersea as to whether they could accept the helicopter.

The report stated that at 07:59, just 15 seconds before hitting the crane, the final exchange between ATC and the helicopter, callsign Rocket 2, was:

- ATC: Rocket 2, yeah Battersea diversion approved; you're cleared to Battersea.
- Barnes: Lovely thanks; Rocket 2.
- ATC: Rocket 2, contact Battersea 122.9. ^{[Note 2]}
- Barnes: 229, thanks a lot.

After the exchange ended at 07:59:18, when the helicopter was approximately 150 metres (490 ft) south-west of Vauxhall Bridge, it immediately afterwards began to turn right. At 07:59:25, it struck the crane on the south side of the river 275 metres (902 ft) from the south-west end of Vauxhall Bridge.

The AAIB report also stated that:

- Calculations suggest that the collision happened at about 682 feet (208 m) above ground level. The total height from the ground to the top of the crane's jib was 719 feet (219 m).
- The main rotor head, gearbox, and a section of one of the four rotor blades from the helicopter, which had all separated from the fuselage as an immediate result of the initial collision with the jib, landed in the loading bay of New Covent Garden Market in Nine Elms, where they hit a delivery van.
- The solar-powered red warning lights on top of the crane were not switched on during the crash, because the official requirement was that "the obstacle be lit at night only." An official Notice to Airmen (NOTAM) warning had been issued about the structure.

In March 2013, BBC London report indicated that the crash could have been prevented, based on a study written in 2005 to which "19 experts contributed, from organisations including National Air Traffic Services (NATS), the MoD, the Metropolitan Police Air Support Unit and the British Helicopter Advisory Board". A number of safety issues had been raised by the study – particularly relating to visibility, meteorology and flying in a crowded and complex urban environment – but the CAA had not yet made any changes to the air rules. However, the studies and commentary were claimed to be productive.

The final report was published on 9 September 2014. The report identified two causal factors:

1. The pilot turned onto a collision course with the crane attached to the building and was probably unaware of the helicopter’s proximity to the building at the beginning of the turn.
2. The pilot did not see the crane or saw it too late to take effective avoiding action.

Ten recommendations were made.

An inquest determined that the deaths of Barnes and Wood were accidental.

== Notes ==
1. The NOTAM read: "Q) EGTT/QOBCE/IV/M/ AE/000/008/5129N00007W001 B) FROM: 13/01/07 17:00C) TO: 13/03/15 23:59 E) HIGH RISE JIB CRANE (LIT AT NIGHT) OPR WI 1NM 5129N 00007W, HGT 770FT AMSL (VAUXHALL, CENTRAL LONDON), OPS CTC 020 7820 3151 12-10-0429/AS 2.", which translates as "In the London Flight Information Region an obstacle has been erected affecting both instrument and visual traffic. Aerodrome and en route traffic is affected. The obstacle is from the surface up to 800 ft amsl and is positioned within 1 nm radius of 51°29’ N 000° 07’W. The obstacle will be in place from 1700 hrs on 7 Jan 2013 to 2359 hrs on 15 March 2013. It is a high rise jib crane (lit at night extending to 770 ft amsl).
2. 122.9 MHz is the VHF communications frequency for the control tower at London Heliport, callsign Battersea Tower.
