= Vauxhall City Farm =

City farm in central London

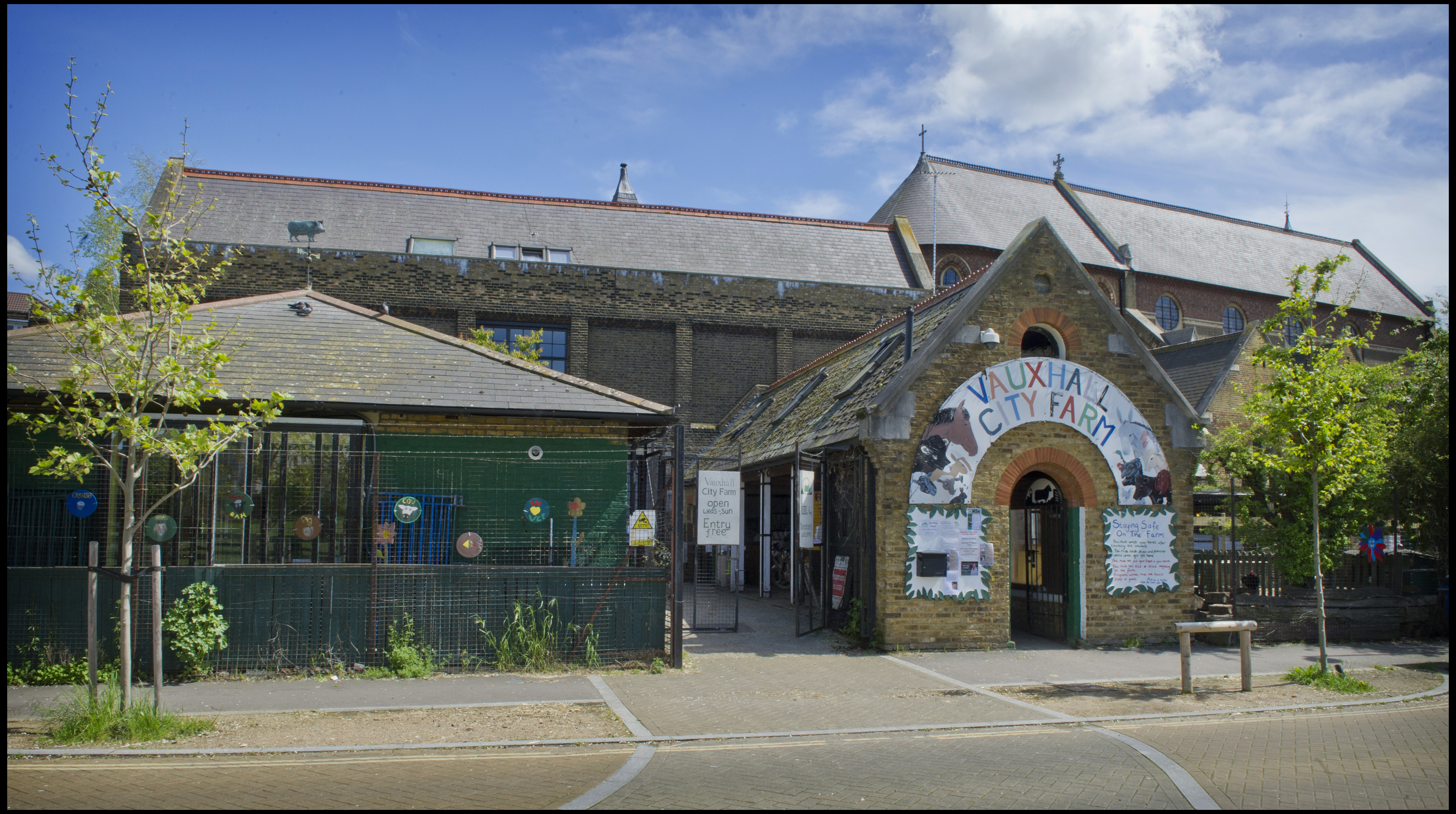
- Entrance to Vauxhall City Farm

- Location within Greater London
- Type: City Farm
- Location: Vauxhall, London
- Coordinates: 51°29′14″N 0°07′09″W
- Status: Open year round
- Website: https://vauxhallcityfarm.org/

Vauxhall City Farm is a city farm located in Vauxhall in the London Borough of Lambeth. The farm is run as a charity focusing on education, youth work, animal care and horticulture and is a centre for the Riding for the Disabled Association.

== History ==
Vauxhall City Farm was founded in 1977 as Jubilee City Farm by a group of architects squatting at St. Oswald's Place, following large-scale demolitions in the neighbourhood between 1972 and 1976.

The farm contains animals such as alpacas, sheep, goats and pigs which are used for the farm's education and youth work as well as for filming and photo-shoots. The farm's pigs have appeared on the Alan Titchmarsh Show and the goats were used to graze a meadow on the roof of the Queen Elizabeth Hall on the South Bank in 2013. In April 2009, BBC London's "Farmyard Cam" streamed live footage of the sheep at the farm.

In October 2013, planning permission was granted for a major overhaul of the farm alongside new affordable housing. In 2013, the farm was also granted funding from Sport England and The National Lottery to build three new stables.

== Projects and services ==
Entrance to the farm is free, and there is a cafe and gift shop.

The farm operates a therapy riding centre as well as youth and animal projects. Former riders at the farm include Sam Martin, who trained to take part in the 2016 Summer Olympics. In November 2011, the farm offered twenty London families free riding lessons run by European Dressage Championship gold medalist Emile Faurie. It also hosts a group of spinners who make yarn from the wool of the sheep and alpacas using dyes cultivated from vegetables and plants grown on the site.

The farm's riding school offers lessons for people with disabilities, while children can "own a pony" during school holidays to learn how to care for them and ride them. A scheme with local schools and nurseries allows children to watch chicks hatch in their classrooms.

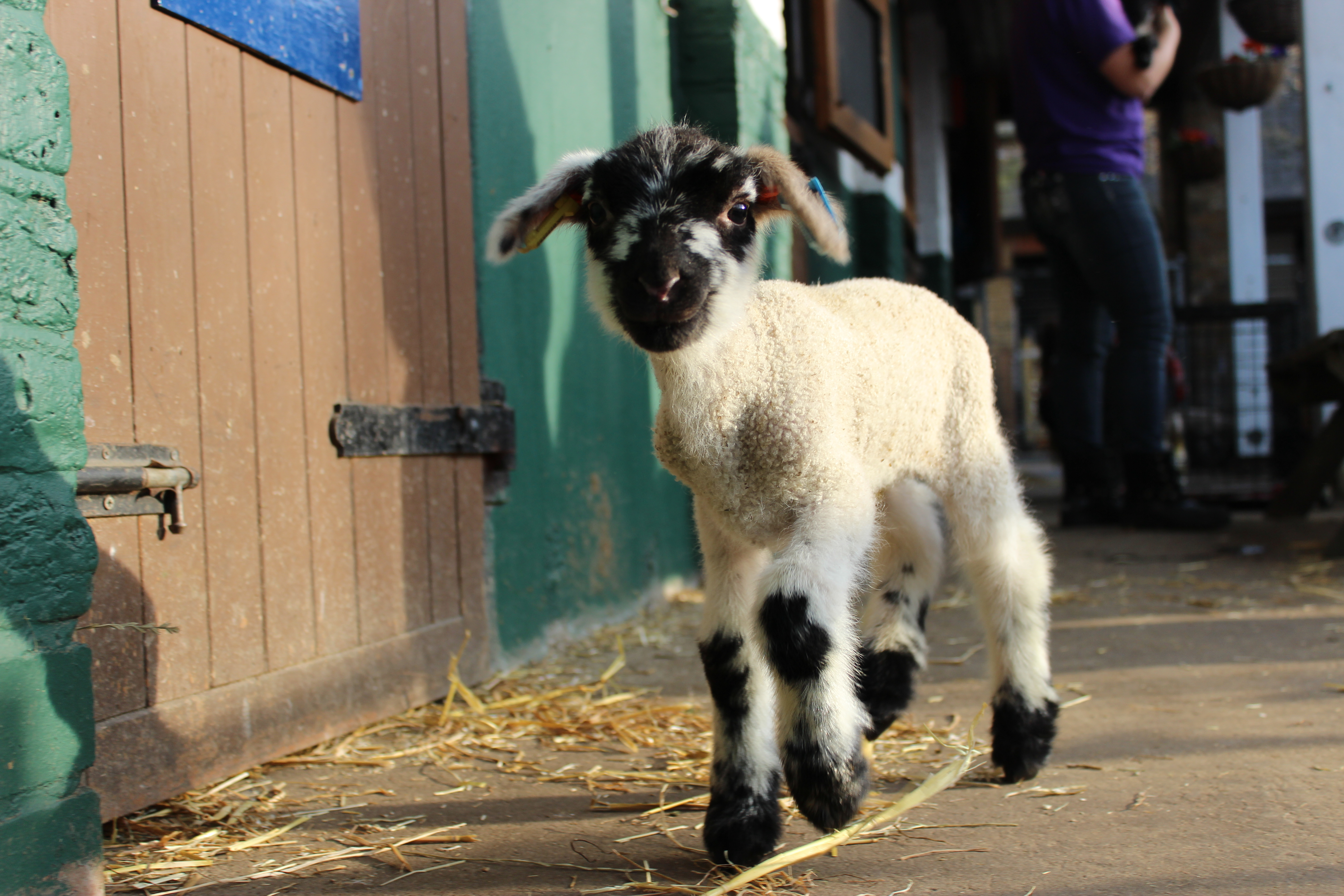
A spring lamb

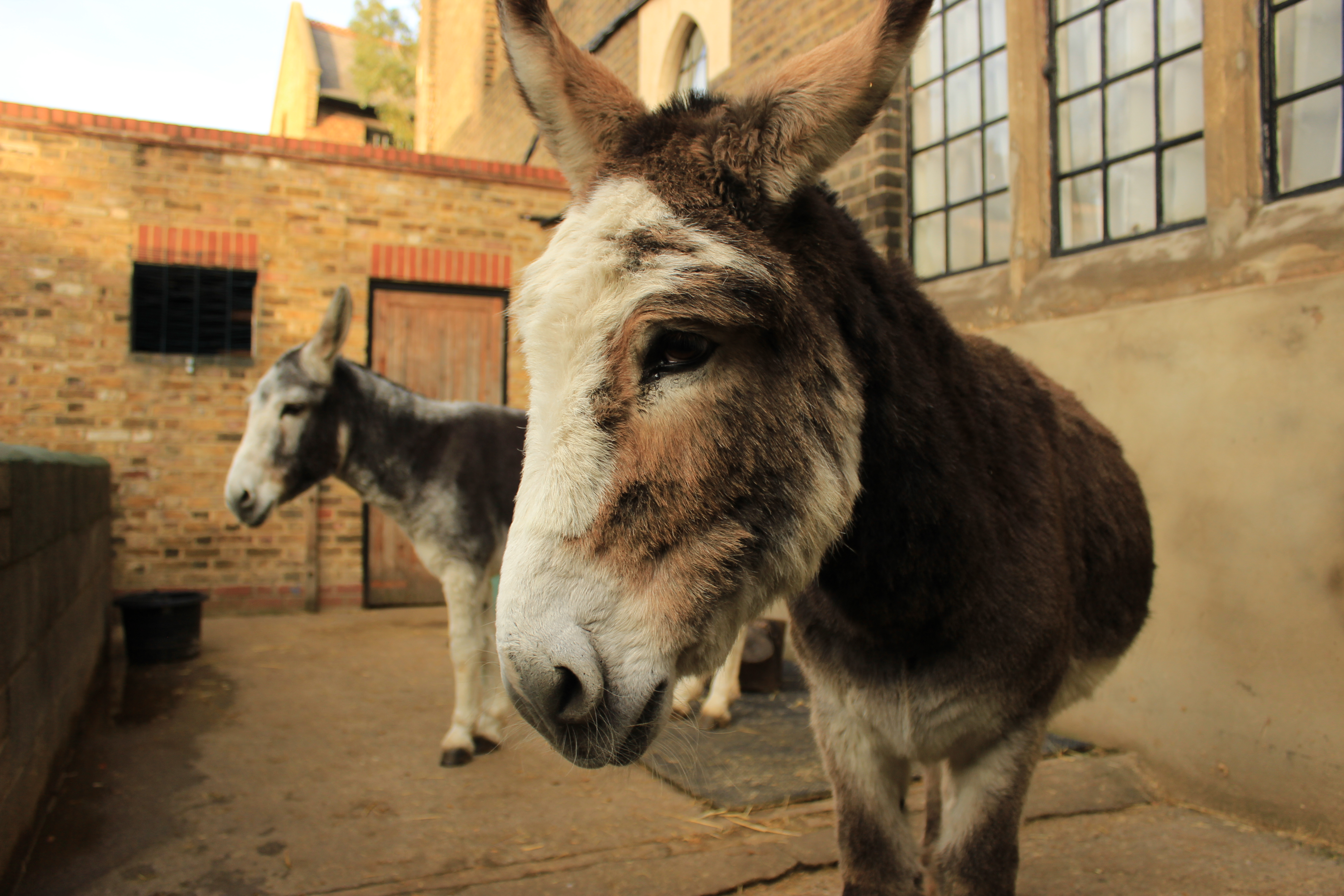
Donkeys Bert and Ernie

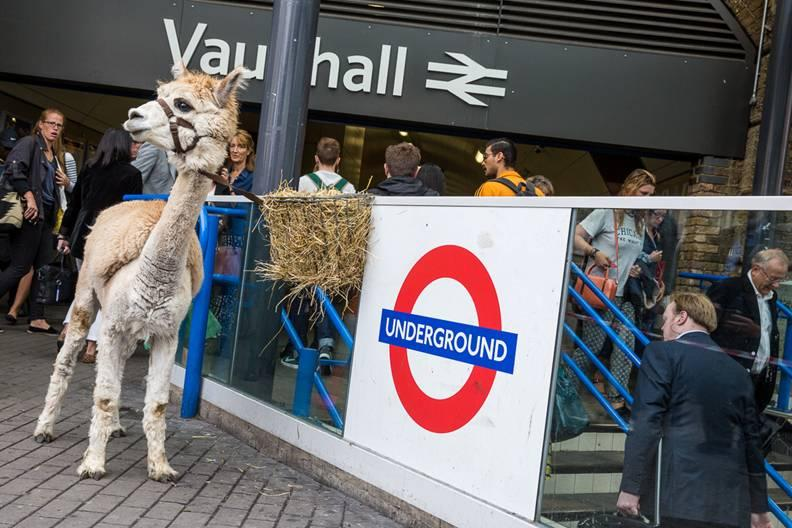
An alpaca helping TfL advertise their London Overground map

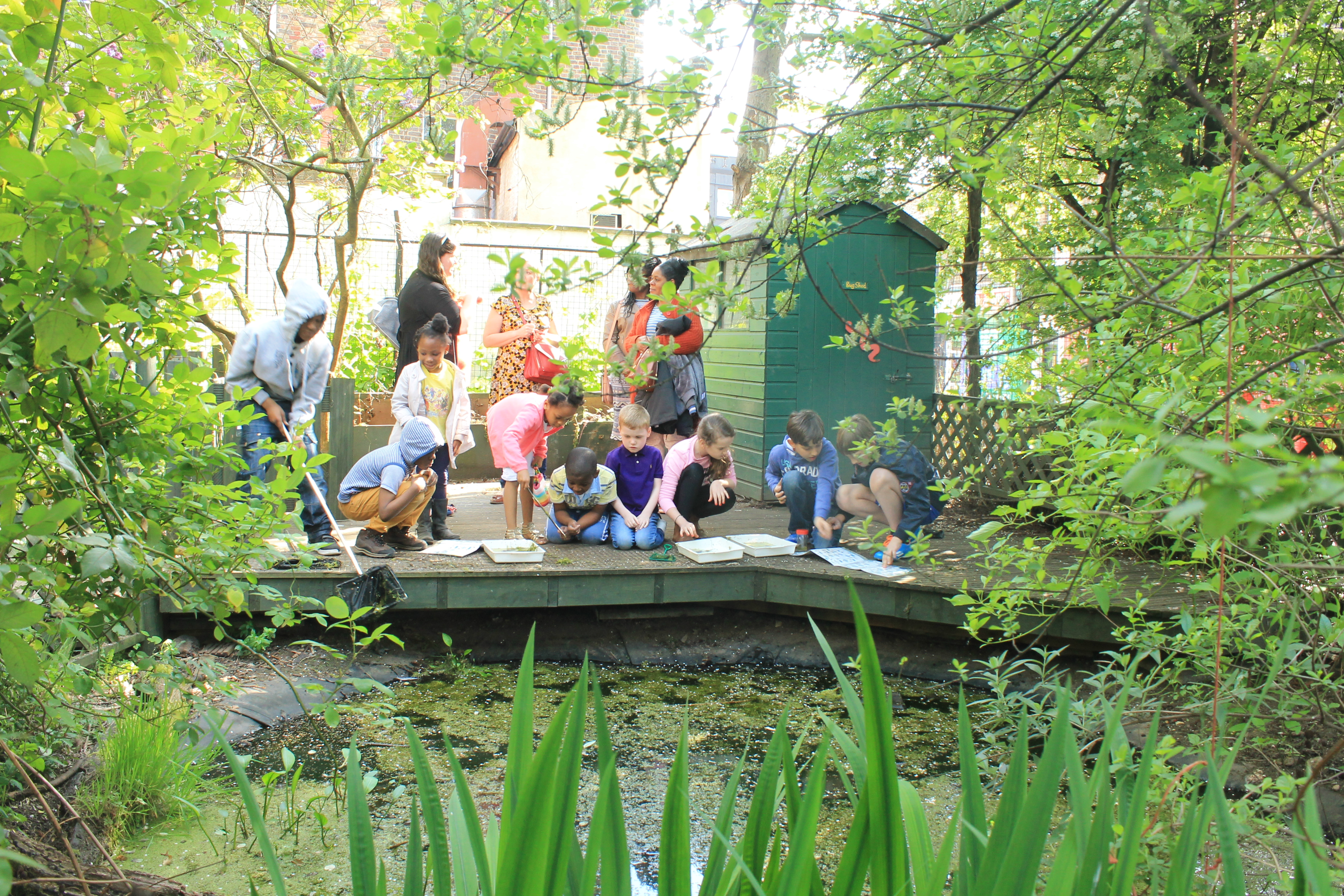
Pond dipping

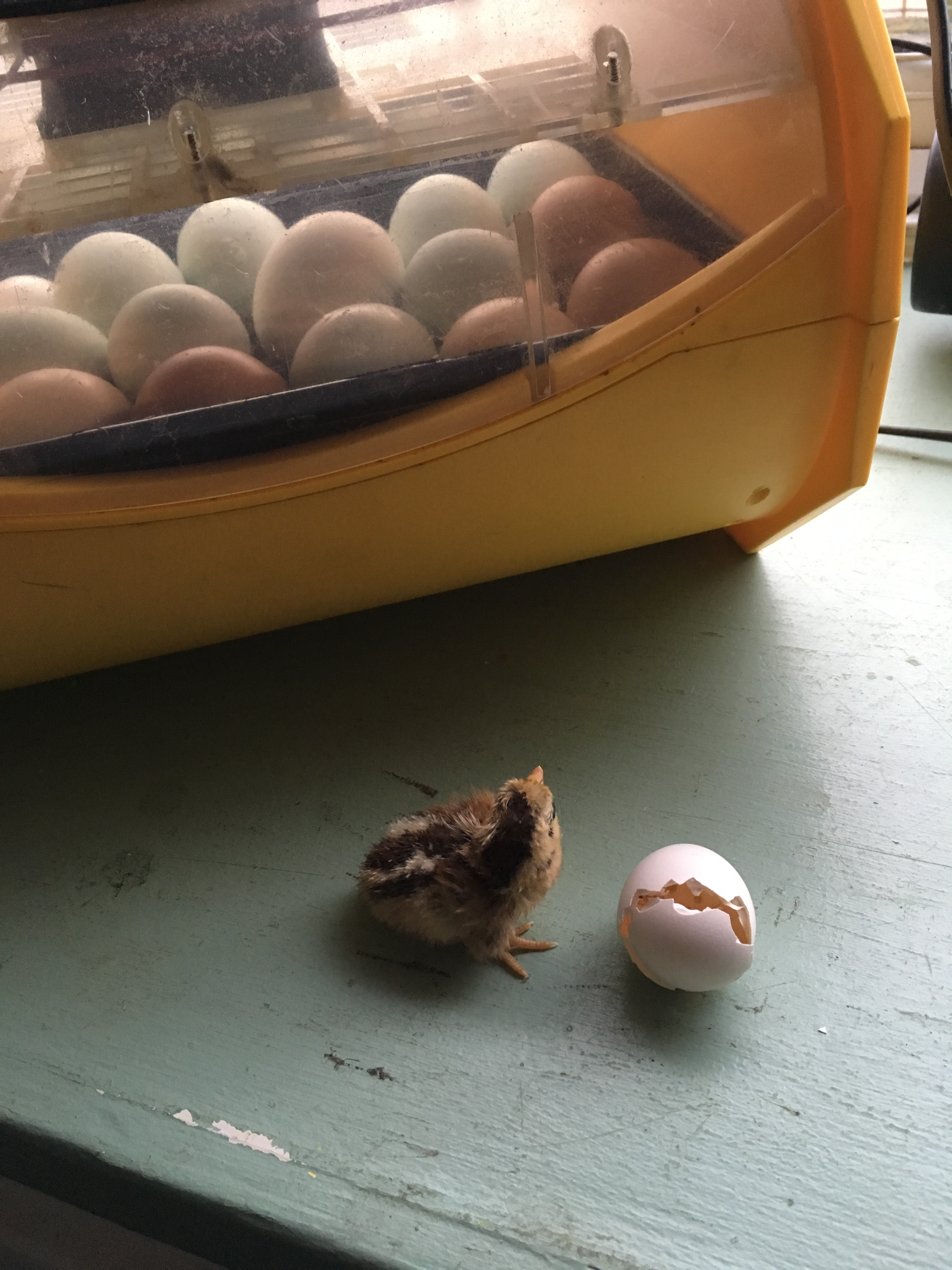
Incubator with freshly hatched chick

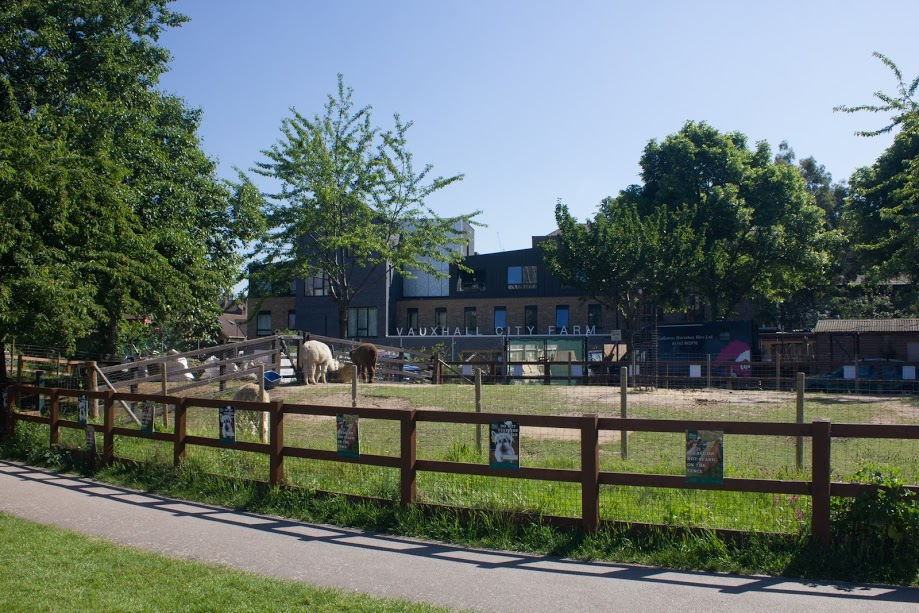
Livestock paddock

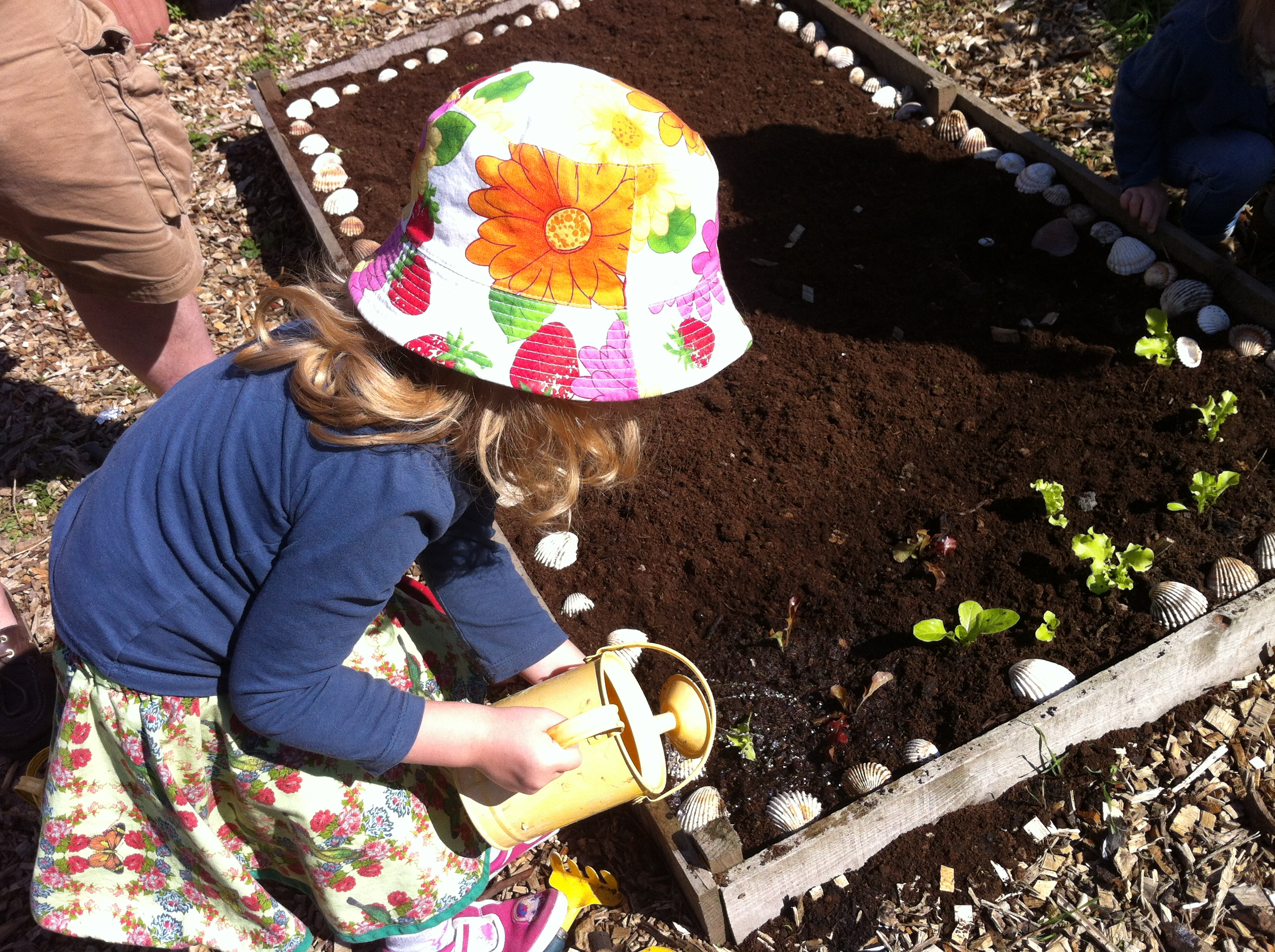
A child, gardening

Farmyard with animals
