= St George Wharf Tower =

Skyscraper in Vauxhall, London, England

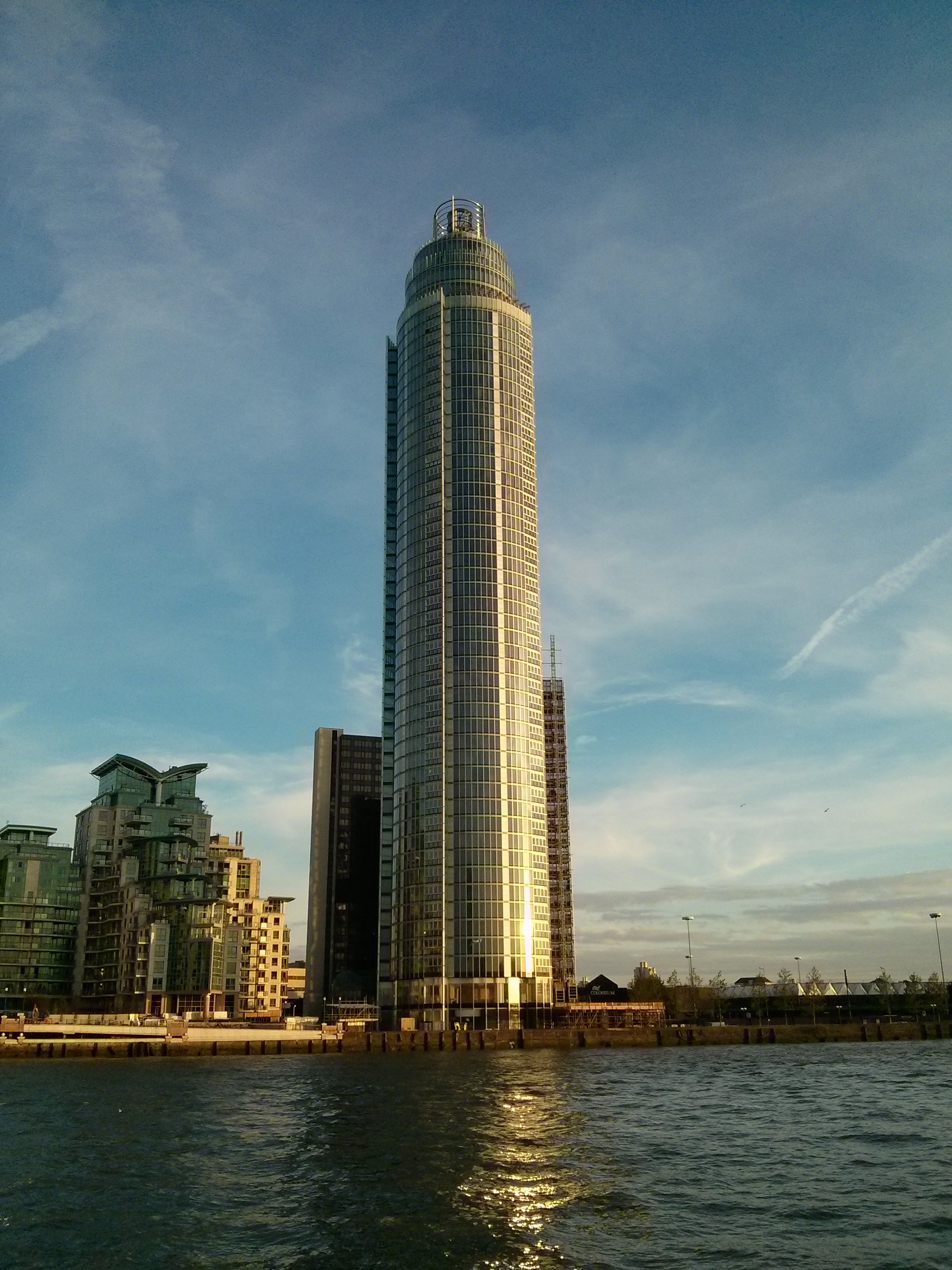
- St George Wharf Tower in 2013

General information
- Status: Completed
- Location: London, England
- Coordinates: 51°29′6″N 0°7′38″W
- Construction started: March 2010
- Completed: January 2014

Height
- Roof: 181 metres (594 ft)

Technical details
- Floor count: 52
- Floor area: 30,342 m^{2} (326,600 sq ft), 223 flats

Design and construction
- Architect: Broadway Malyan
- Structural engineer: WYG, Robert Bird Group
- Main contractor: Brookfield Multiplex

St George Wharf Tower, also known as the Vauxhall Tower, is a residential skyscraper in Vauxhall, London, and part of the St George Wharf development. At 181 metres (594 ft) tall with 50 storeys, it is the 20th-tallest building in London and was the tallest residential building (Note: The tallest partly residential building in the United Kingdom - containing the highest apartments - is The Shard in Southwark at 309.6 m (1,016 ft) tall and completed in 2012. St George Wharf Tower was the tallest fully residential building on its completion in 2014, though the tallest is Landmark Pinnacle in Tower Hamlets at 233 m (764 ft) tall and completed in 2020) in the United Kingdom on its completion.

Whilst under construction, in 2013 a helicopter collided with a crane on the building and crashed to the ground, causing two deaths.

== Design features ==
The tower's floor-plan design is based on the shape of a Catherine wheel and is typically divided into five apartments per floor with separating walls radiating out from the central core.

Sky gardens provide residents with a semi-external space stepped forward from the pure circular plan, creating steps in the façade that accentuate the building's height and provide variety and interest in the detailing of the otherwise minimal cladding.

The building is divided into three distinct parts—a base that houses the communal facilities of the building including a lobby, business lounge, gym, spa and swimming pool; a middle section containing most of the apartments; and an upper section where the façade reduces in diameter to provide 360-degree terraces and a wind turbine that tops the structure.

The wind turbine, developed by Anthony Mewburn-Crook in collaboration with British green-technology company Matilda's Planet, powers the tower's common lighting, whilst creating virtually no noise or vibration. At the base of the tower, water is drawn from the London Aquifer and heat pump technology is used to extract warmth from the water in the winter to heat the apartments. In comparison to similar buildings, the tower requires one third of the energy, and produces between one half and two thirds of typical carbon dioxide emissions. It is triple-glazed to minimise heat loss in winter and heat gain in summer, with low-e glazing and ventilated blinds between the glazing to further reduce heat gain from direct sunlight.

Special stairs for the luxury lower penthouse apartments are supplied. These apartments and stairs are a mirror of each other. In one of these apartments there is a 360-degree view across London. The highest swimming pool in the city is located in this apartment.

== Planning ==
Following ongoing advice from the government architectural body, the Commission for Architecture and the Built Environment, two revised planning applications were submitted and subsequently withdrawn. A final decision was made by the then Deputy Prime Minister John Prescott in 2005 and the tower was approved, against the decision of the planning inspector and despite warnings from Prescott's own advisers that it "could set a precedent for the indiscriminate scattering of very tall buildings across London".

== Construction ==
As of October 2011 the concrete core had reached level 22. Glass curtain wall construction began in September 2011, with floors one and two completed by October. As of March 2012 the core had risen beyond the 44th floor. By October 2012, the steel and the core had reached full height, and the installation of the wind turbine began with the glass a few floors below the top of the tower.

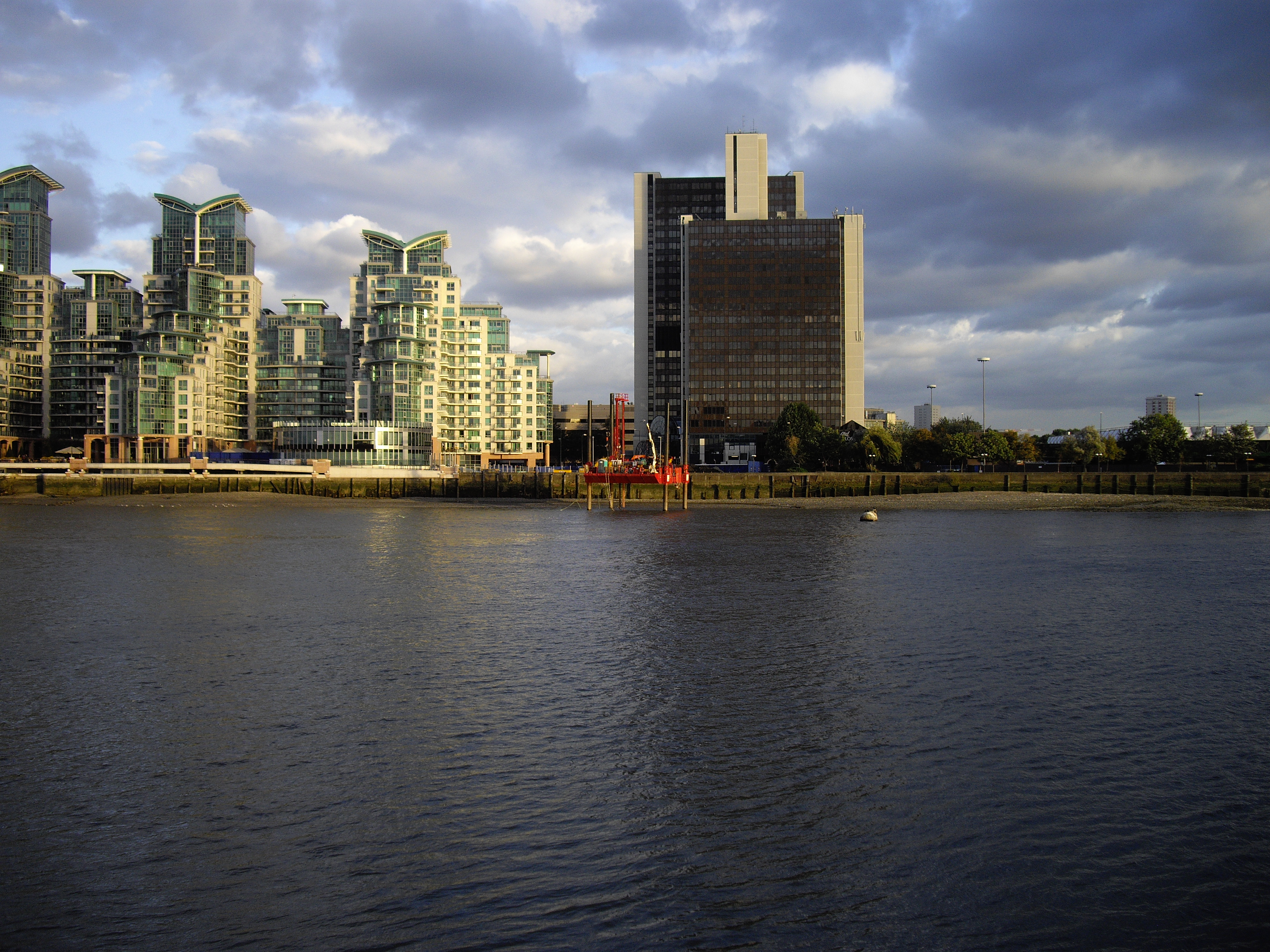
Area before construction in September 2009

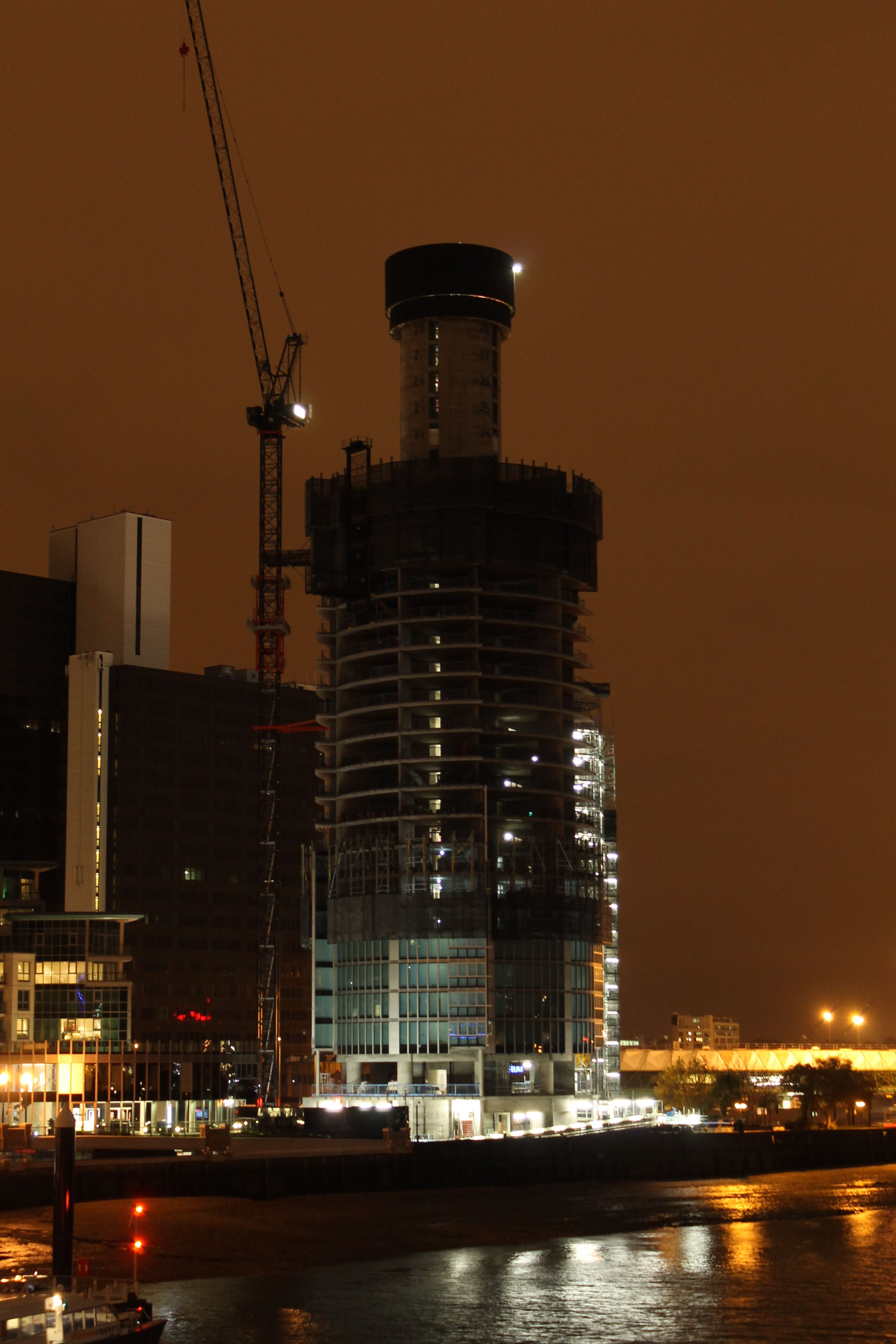
November 2011

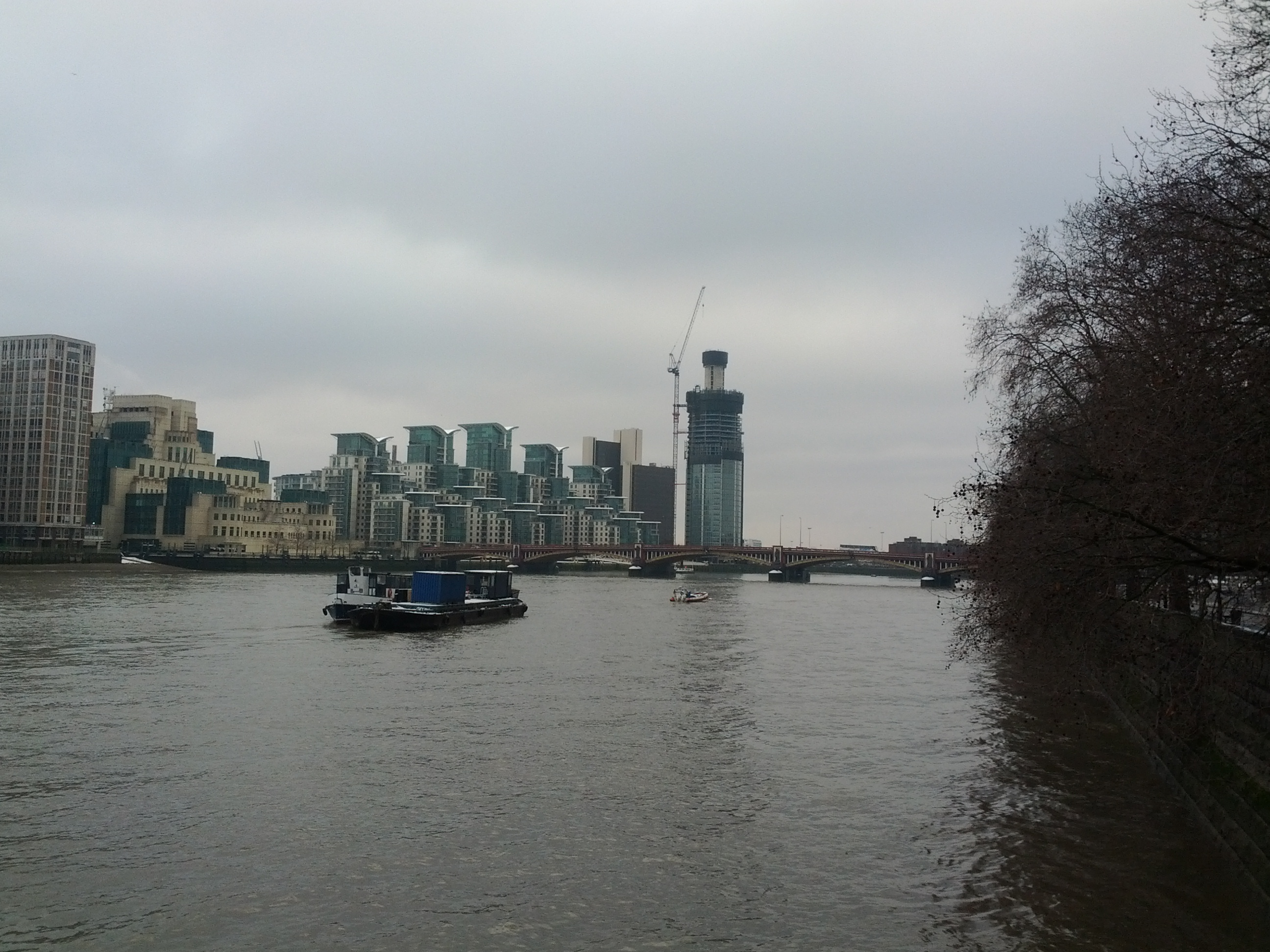
February 2012

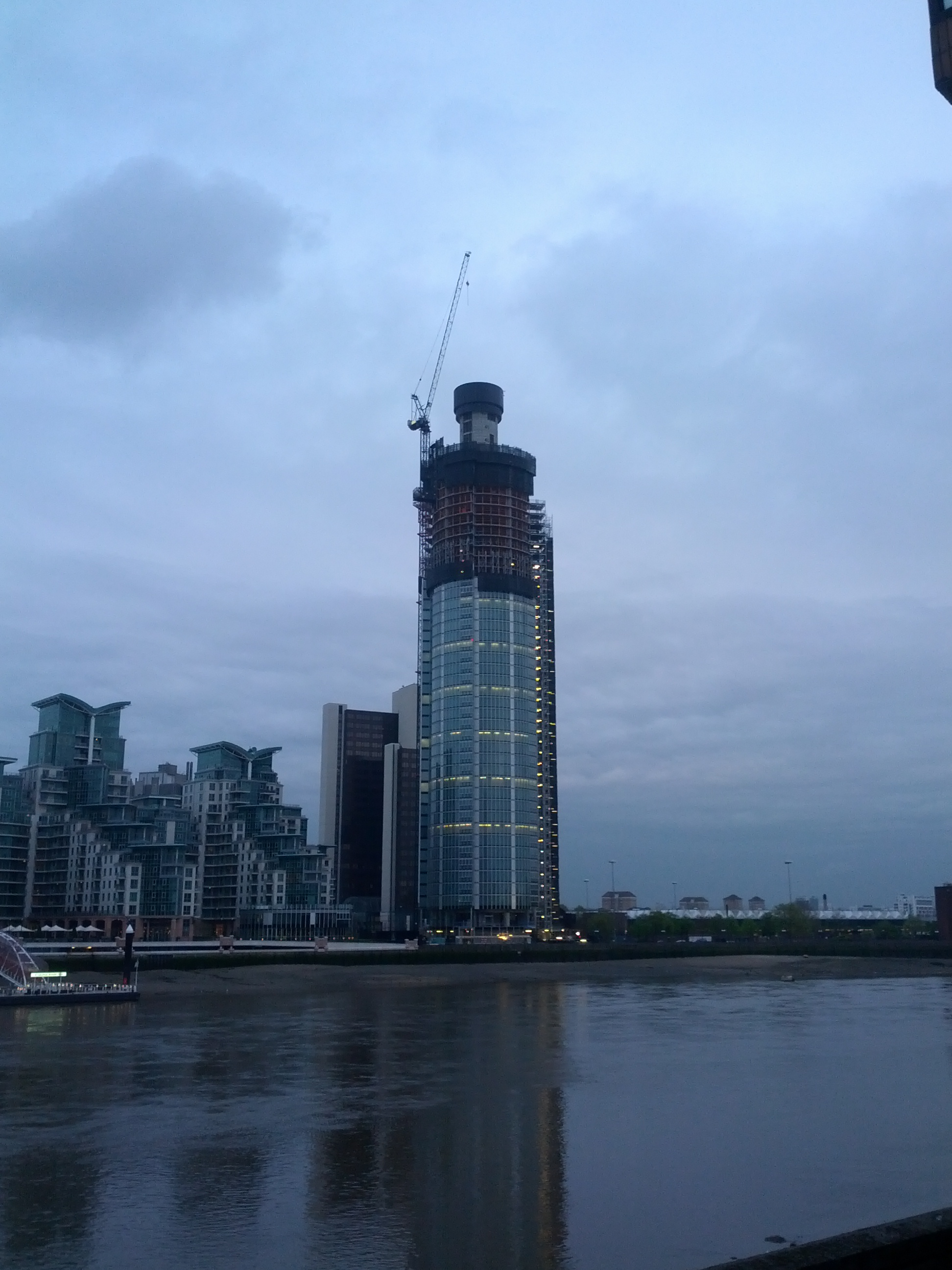
May 2012

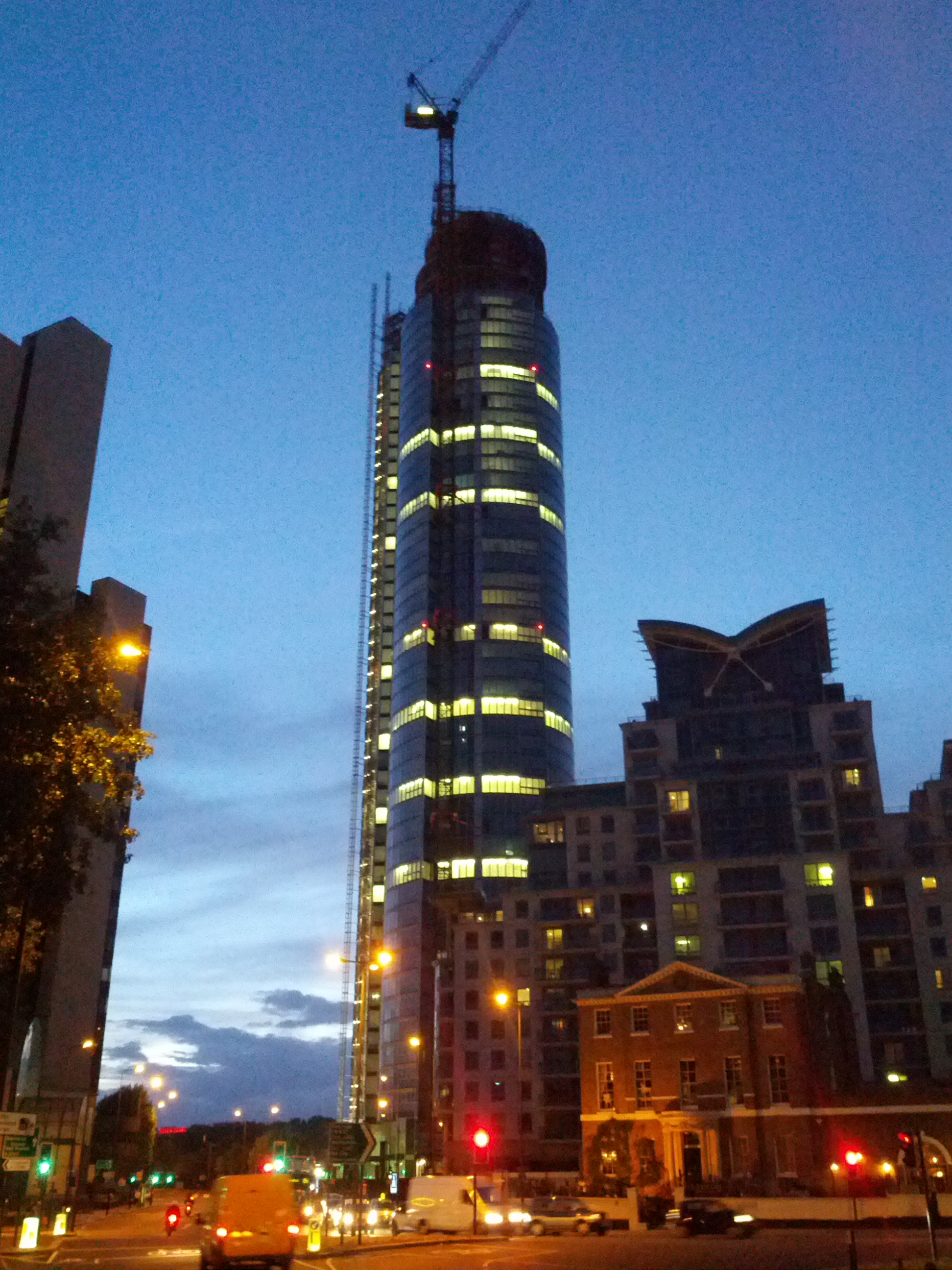
September 2012

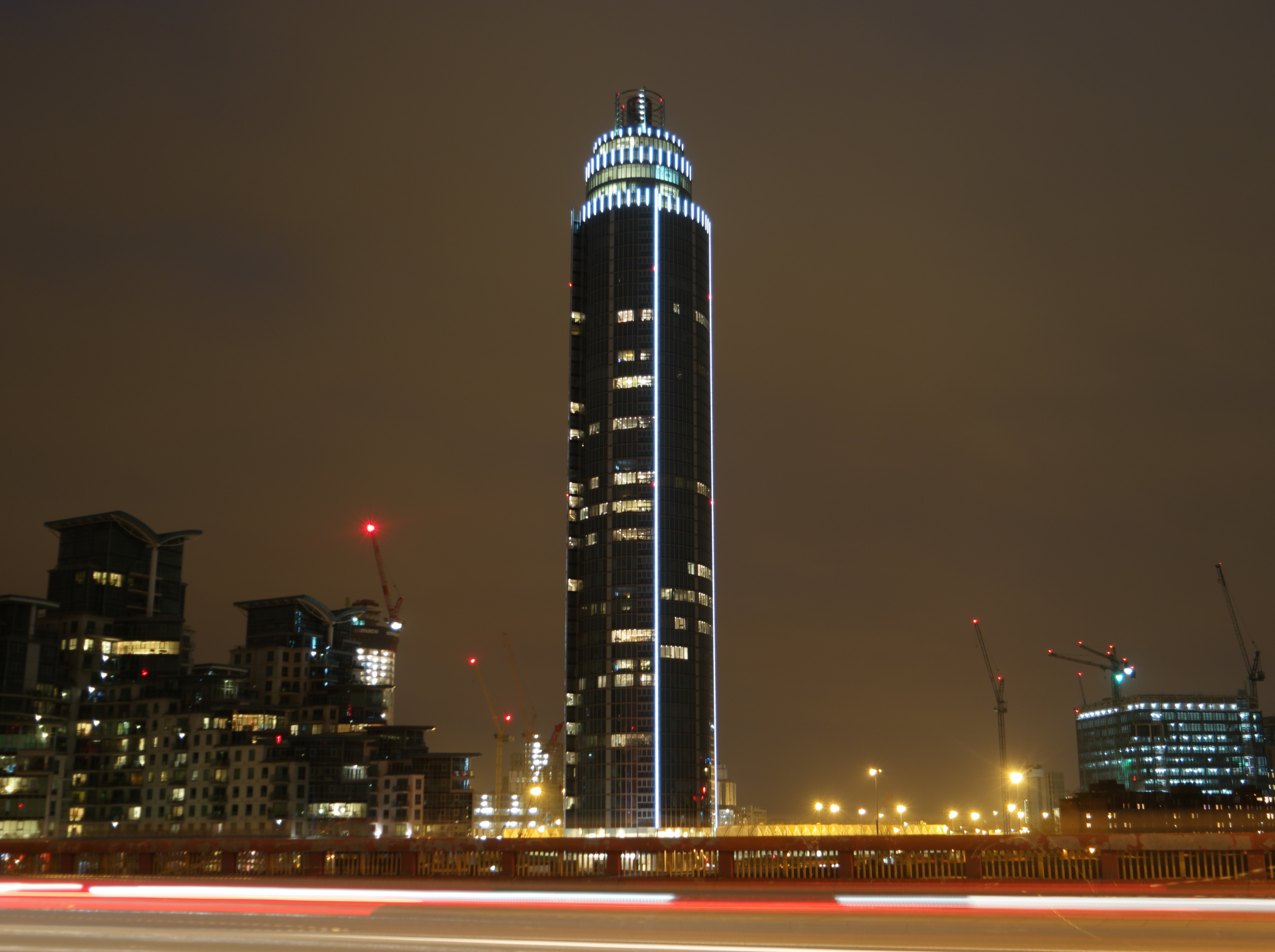
February 2016

== Helicopter crash ==
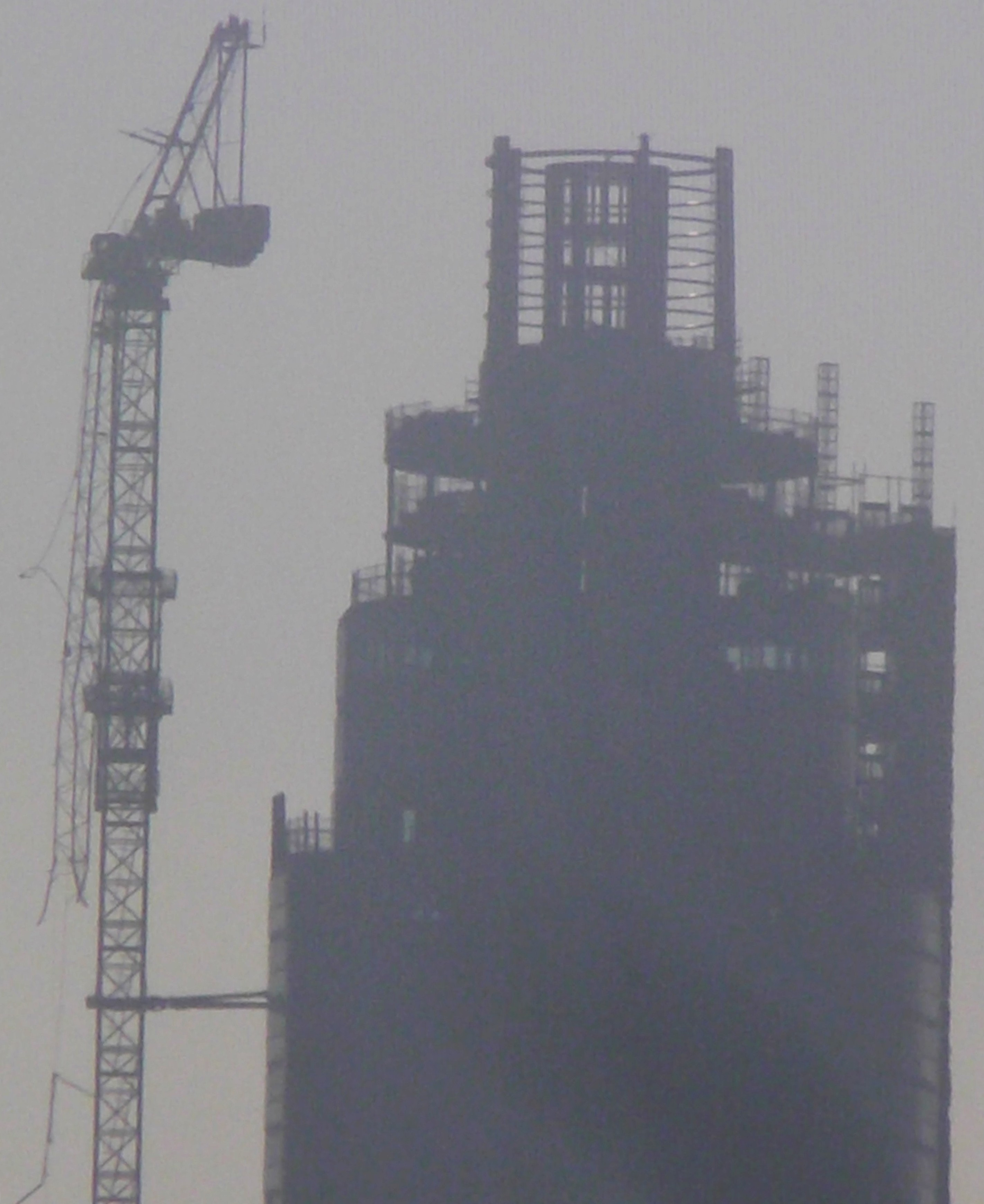
Damage to the crane jib following the accident

On 16 January 2013, at approximately 08:00, two people were killed when an AgustaWestland AW109 helicopter struck a construction crane attached to the near-complete building and then crashed onto Wandsworth Road, hitting two cars and igniting two nearby buildings. One of those killed was the pilot, who was flying alone; the other was a pedestrian. The crane was seriously damaged in the incident, but its operator was late for work so was not in the cab at the time of the collision.

== Carbuncle Cup nomination ==
In August 2014 the tower was nominated and made the Building Design short-list for that year's Carbuncle Cup, which was ultimately awarded to Woolwich Central with St George Wharf Tower being named runner-up.

== Flat ownership ==
The Guardian reported in May 2016 that 131 out of 210 apartments for which title deeds were available were in foreign ownership. The owner of the five-storey penthouse was the family of Andrei Guriev, who was believed to be installing a Russian Orthodox chapel. Other owners included Ebitimi Banigo and Vitaly Orlov (who had purchased the entire 39th floor). In 184 of the tower's apartments, no resident was registered to vote in the UK.

== See also ==
- Marina City, Chicago
