= Collett baronets =

Baronetcy in the Baronetage of the United Kingdom

The Collett Baronetcy, of Bridge ward in the City of London, is a title in the Baronetage of the United Kingdom. It was created on 1 November 1934 for Sir Charles Henry Collett, Lord Mayor of London from 1933 to 1934. Sir Christopher Collett, uncle of the third Baronet, was Lord Mayor of London in 1988.

== Collett baronets, of Bridge Ward (1934) ==
- Sir Charles Henry Collett, 1st Baronet (1864–1938)
- Sir Henry Seymour Collett, 2nd Baronet (1893–1971)
- Sir Ian Seymour Collett, 3rd Baronet (born 1953)

The heir apparent is the present holder's son Anthony Seymour Collett (born 1984).
