= Street names of Vauxhall =

This is a list of the toponymy of street names in the London district of Vauxhall. The area has no formally defined boundaries – those utilised here are Black Prince Road to the north, Kennington Road to the north-east, Kennington Park Road/Clapham Road to the south-east, Miles Street/Fentiman Road to the south, and Wandsworth Road/Nine Elms Lane/river Thames to the west.

- Albert Embankment – built in the 1860s over former marshlands, it was named for Albert, Prince Consort, husband of Queen Victoria
- Ashmole Street – after Elias Ashmole, noted 17th century antiquarian, who lived near here
- Auckland Street
- Aveline Street
- Bedser Close – presumably for Alec Bedser, widely regarded as one of the best English cricketers of the 20th century, by association with the nearby Oval Cricket Ground
- Black Prince Road – after Edward the Black Prince, son of Edward III, who owned this land
- Bondway – after the late 18th century developers of this street John and Sarah Bond
- Bonnington Square
- Bowling Green Street – this land was formerly a bowling green leased to the owners of the nearby Horns Tavern
- Brangton Road
- Cardigan Street
- Carroun Road – after the former Carroun, or Caron, House which stood here
- Citadel Place
- Clapham Road – as it leads to the south-west London area of this name
- Claylands Place and Claylands Road – after the former brick clay fields located here prior to 1800
- Clayton Street – after the Clayton family, who leased much of this land from the Duchy of Cornwall from the 1660s on
- Coney Way
- Cottingham Road
- Courtenay Square and Courtenay Street
- Dolland Street
- Durham Street
- Ebbisham Drive
- Elias Place
- Farnham Royal
- Fentiman Road – after local mid-19th century developer John Fentiman
- Glasshouse Walk – after the former Vauxhall Glassworks here, which thrived in the 1700s
- Glyn Street
- Goding Street
- Graphite Square
- Hanover Gardens
- Hansom Mews
- Harleyford Road – after local leaseholders the Claytons, whose country house was Harleyford Manor, Buckinghamshire
- Harold Place
- Jonathan Street – for Jonathan Tyers and his son, managers of the nearby Vauxhall Gardens for much of the 18th century
- Kennington Gardens, Kennington Oval, Kennington Park Road, Kennington Road – after the Old English Chenintune (‘settlement of Chenna’a people’); another explanation is that it means "place of the King", or "town of the King".
- Lambeth Road and South Lambeth Place – refers to a harbour where lambs were either shipped from or to. It is formed from the Old English 'lamb' and 'hythe'.
- Langley Lane
- Laud Street – after William Laud, Archbishop of Canterbury from 1633 to 1645, by association with the nearby Lambeth Palace
- Lawn Lane – after a former row of houses here called The Lawn, after their grass plots, demolished in 1889-90
- Leopold Walk
- Lilac Place
- Loughborough Street
- Magee Street
- Meadow Mews and Meadow Road – after the former meadows here attached to Caron House
- Miles Street
- Montford Place
- Newburn Street
- New Spring Gardens Walk – after the former Vauxhall Gardens here
- Nine Elms Lane – after a row of nine elm trees which formerly stood along this lane
- Orsett Street
- Oval Way – after the adjacent Oval Cricket Ground
- Palfrey Place
- Parry Street – after Thomas Parry, 17th century statesman and owner of Copt Hall, a house near here
- Pegasus Place
- Randall Road and Randall Row
- Riverside Walk – simply a descriptive name
- Rudolf Place
- St Oswald's Place
- Salamanca Place and Salamanca Street
- Sancroft Street – after William Sancroft, 79th Archbishop of Canterbury, by association with the nearby Lambeth Palace
- Stables Way
- Stanley Close
- Tinworth Street – after George Tinworth, noted ceramic artist for the Royal Doulton ceramics company at Lambeth
- Trigon Road
- Tyers Street and Tyers Terrace – for Jonathan Tyers and his son, managers of the nearby Vauxhall Gardens for much of the 18th century
- Vauxhall Bridge (and Bridgefoot), Vauxhall Grove, Vauxhall Street and Vauxhall Walk – from the name of Falkes de Breauté, the head of King John's mercenaries, who owned a large house in the area, which was referred to as Faulke's Hall, later Foxhall, and eventually Vauxhall; the Bridge opened in 1816
- Wandsworth Road – as it led to the south-west London area of this name
- Wickham Street
- Windmill Row
- Worgan Street
- Wynyard Terrace
