= Fairoaks Airport =

Airport in Chobham, Surrey, England

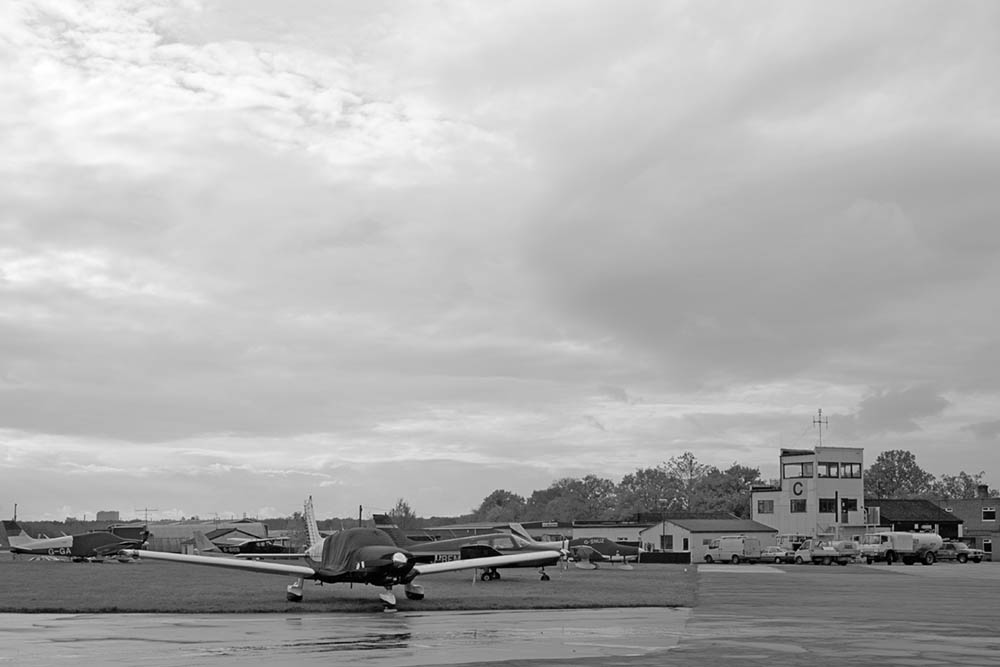
- Fairoaks Control Tower in 2006
- IATA: none; ICAO: EGTF

Summary
- Airport type: Private-owned, Public-use
- Owner: Albemarle Fairoaks Airport Ltd. and Airport Development Partners
- Operator: Fairoaks Operations Ltd.
- Serves: Woking
- Location: Chobham, Surrey, England
- Opened: 1931
- Elevation AMSL: 80 ft / 24 m
- Coordinates: 51°20′53″N 000°33′31″W

Map
- Location in Surrey

Runways
Direction	Length		Surface
Direction	m	ft	Surface
06/24	813	2,667	Asphalt
- Sources: UK AIP at NATS; Pooley's Flight Guide; Pilot magazine

Fairoaks Airport (ICAO: EGTF) is a general aviation airport between Chobham and Chertsey in Surrey, England. It is 2 NM (3.7 km; 2.3 mi) north of Woking and 2.8 miles (4.5 km) from Junction 11 of the M25 motorway which is between the M3 and A3 junctions.

== History ==
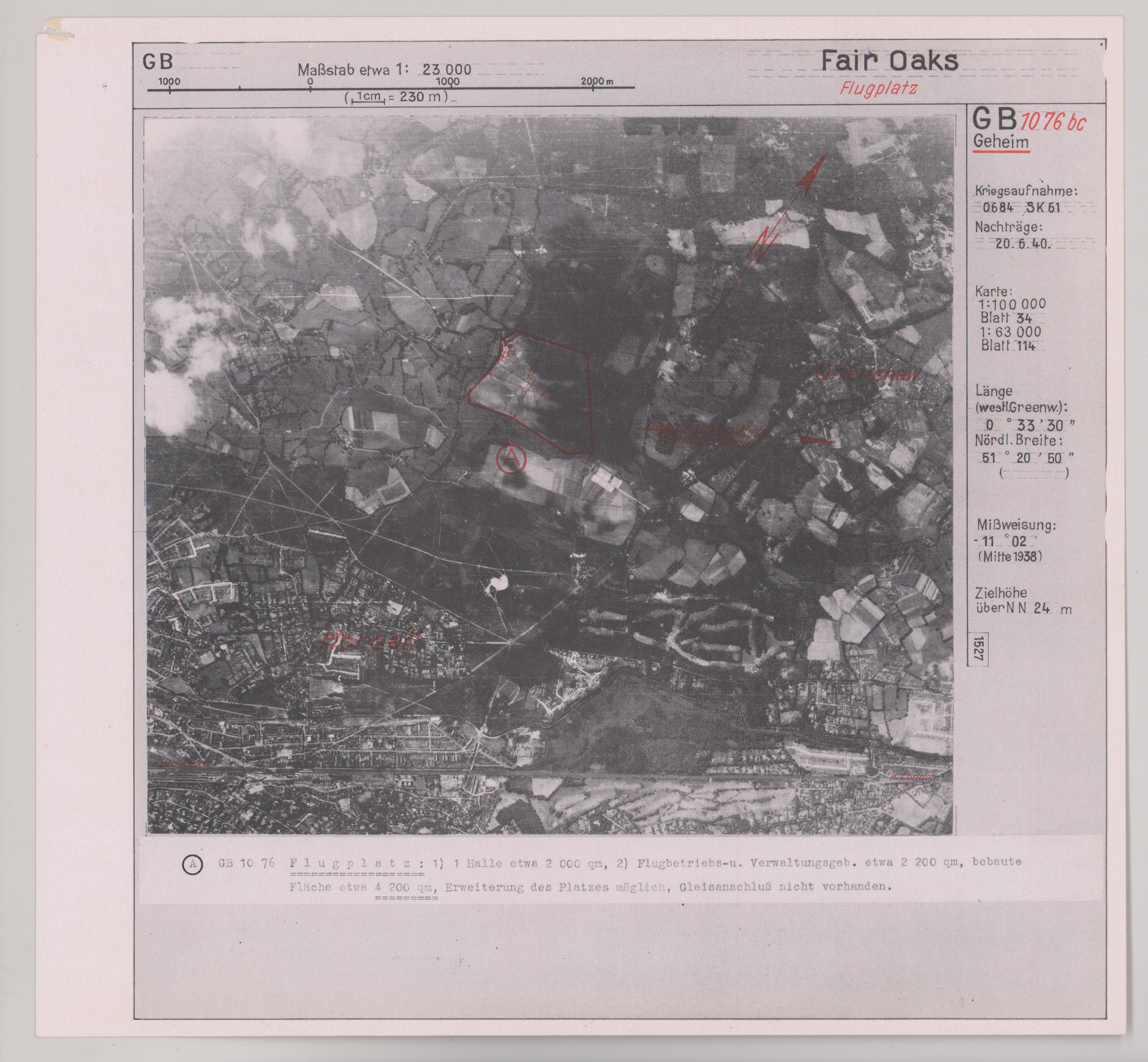
RAF Fairoaks on a target dossier of ther German Luftwaffe, 1940

Fairoaks opened as a private airstrip in 1931, but was signed up for military use in 1936 and became RAF Fairoaks during World War II. It was used as a training airfield, with No. 18 Elementary & Reserve Flying School being formed on 1 October 1937 equipped with De Havilland Tiger Moths. 6,000 pilots were trained at the airfield, mostly in Tiger Moths. Terence O'Brien, an Australian pilot, later wrote a series of books about his experiences in the RAF. In "Chasing After Danger", he recounts doing primary flight training on Tiger Moths at Fairoaks in 1940, when it was still a grass aerodrome.

The unit was re-designated No. 18 Reserve Flying School on 14 May 1947 and was managed by Universal Flying Services. The Tiger Moths were replaced by De Havilland Canada Chipmunks in 1951 but the school was disbanded on 31 July 1953.

In the early postwar years, the airfield was managed by Universal Flying Services, which operated a flying training school and provided aircraft maintenance services. The airfield was sold by auction in 1967. Alan Mann Helicopters began operations there in 1968 after which The Alan Mann Group became the operator. The hard runway was constructed in 1979. The Alan Mann Group sold its interests in 2008 to Albemarle Fairoaks Airport Ltd which owns Fairoaks Operations Ltd, the operator. The landside buildings were owned by West Register Property until they sold their interest on 8 December 2015 to TEREF ADP Fairoaks Limited, a company registered in Jersey number 120101 which was formed on 27 November 2015.

On 25 November 2016 the airport owners announced plans to close the airport, and build a 1,500 unit housing development to be known as "Fairoaks Garden Village". In June 2022, Surrey Heath Borough Council announced that the proposed development would not form part of its Draft Local Plan, which identifies sites for new homes in the local area.

== Current operation ==
Fairoaks Aerodrome has a United Kingdom Civil Aviation Authority Ordinary Licence that allows flights for the public transport of passengers or for flying instruction as authorised by the licensee. The facility is used by light aircraft, some of which are operated by its two resident training schools - Synergy Aviation and London Transport Flying Club. Its business centre is substantially dedicated to aviation-related enterprises, including the headquarters of the European Regions Airline Association and the British Helicopter Advisory Board.

Fairoaks was formerly equipped with a non-directional beacon (NDB) for short-range radio navigation, until its withdrawal in January 2020.

There is a low-category fire and rescue service, operating a Category 3 fire service to allow commercial operations of mid sized turboprops and small jets. The fire and rescue vehicles comprise two Terberg TACR-3 vehicles.

From 1994 until 2009 one of three South East Regional Air Support Unit (Metropolitan and Surrey Police Forces) helicopters (and for a period of this time one for the latter force alone) were at Fairoaks. In June 2009, the remaining police helicopter was transferred to RAF Odiham in Hampshire on security grounds.

There are no restrictions on the number of helicopter movements, but fixed wing movements are limited to 120,000 per annum.

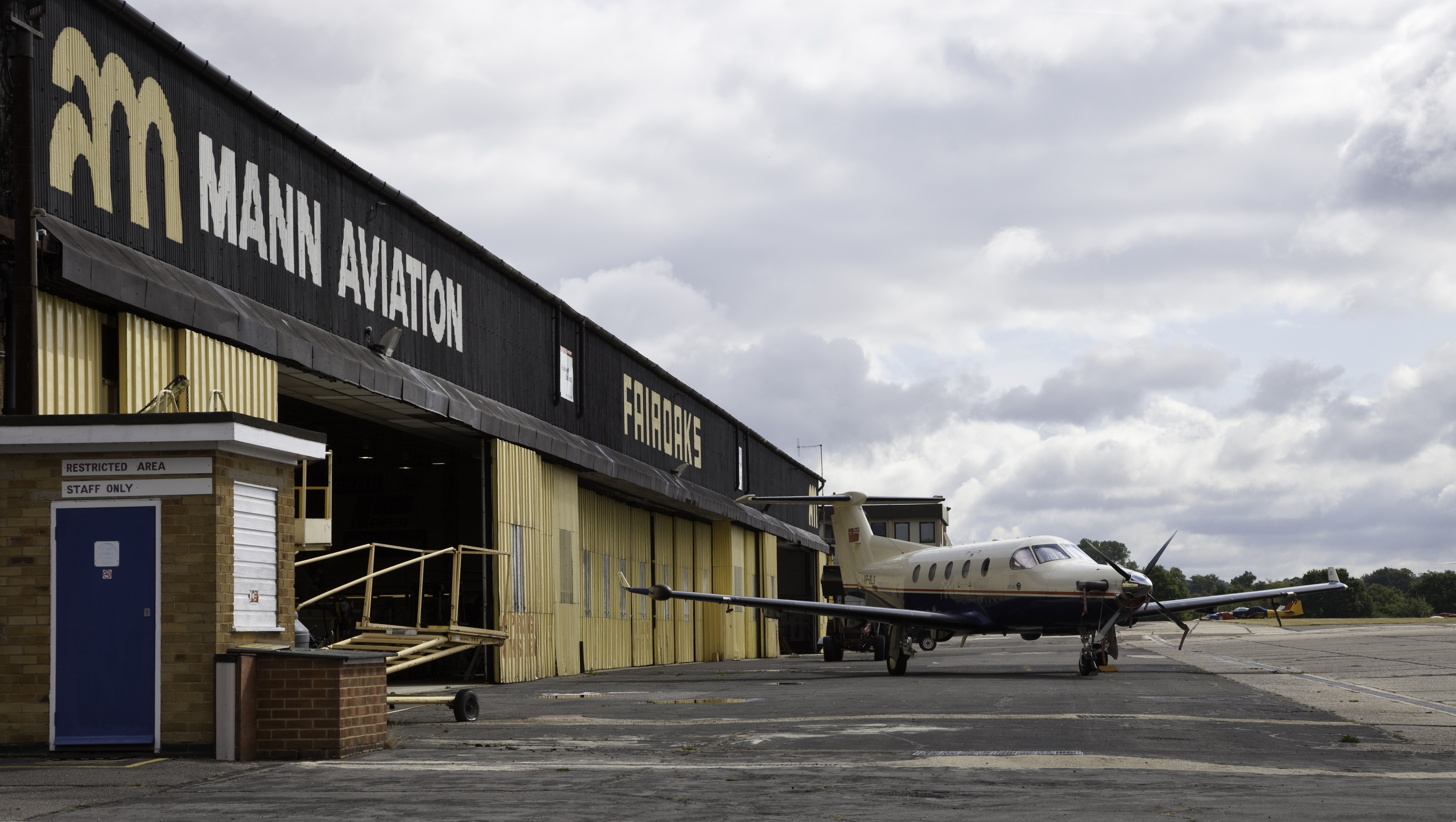
Hangar with old branding at Fairoaks

== Flying information ==
A majority of the Fairoaks Aerodrome Traffic Zone (ATZ) is within the London Control Zone (CTR), therefore special procedures are in place to enable flights to depart and arrive at Fairoaks without the need to contact Heathrow Radar.

== Bibliography ==
- Sturtivant, R. C. (1997). Royal Air Force Flying Training and Support Units. Air-Britain (Historians) Ltd. ISBN 0-85130-252-1.

== See also ==
- Airports of London
