= Sir Charles Collett, 1st Baronet =

Sir Charles Henry Collett, 1st Baronet (July 1864 – 23 November 1938) was Lord Mayor of London for 1933 to 1934.

His daughter in law was Olga Collett, BBC broadcaster described as “Britain’s Ace Radio Talker".

== See also ==
- Collett baronets

== Links ==
- Biography, ukwhoswho.com. Accessed 6 January 2023.
