= British Helicopter Advisory Board =

British Helicopter Association
- Abbreviation: BHA (former BHAB)
- Formation: 1969
- Legal status: Non-profit organisation
- Purpose: Helicopter travel in the UK
- Location: Fairoaks Airport, Chobham, Surrey
- Region served: UK
- Members: Helicopter operating companies
- Website: British Helicopter Association

The British Helicopter Association is the UK industry association for helicopter transport.

== History ==
The British Helicopter Advisory Board was formed in January 1969 at the instigation of some leading members of commercial helicopter companies in the UK. They realised that there was no single authoritative voice speaking for the whole helicopter industry similar to organisations which represent other major aviation interests. In November 2008, it changed its name to the British Helicopter Association. There are about 1100 helicopters on the UK civil register. Helicopters have been used more recently in the UK for emergency services.

== Structure ==
The BHA is a non-profit making organisation whose main objective is to promote the use of helicopters throughout the United Kingdom and to bring to the attention of potential users the advantages of owning or chartering a helicopter.

The BHA has a small permanent Secretariat which is based at Fairoaks Airport in north-west Surrey.

Past Chairmen have included the 4th Baron Glenarthur, who is now President. The current Chairman is Mr D J Stubbs.

== See also ==
- Civil Aviation Authority (United Kingdom)
