= London Heliport =

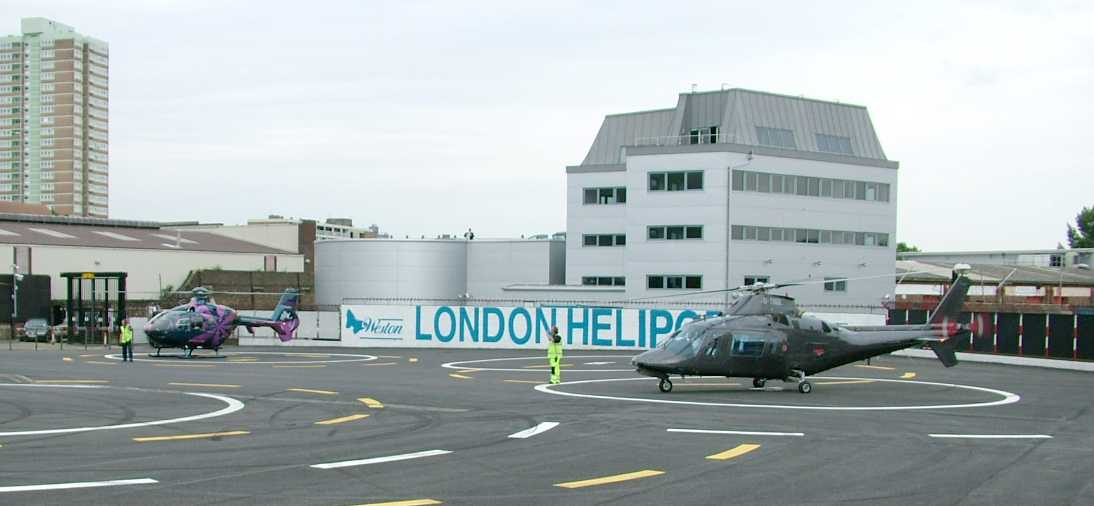
- IATA: none; ICAO: EGLW

Summary
- Airport type: Public
- Owner: Reuben Brothers
- Operator: The London Airport Ltd.
- Location: Battersea, London, England
- Elevation AMSL: 18 ft / 5 m
- Coordinates: 51°28′12″N 000°10′46″W
- Website: www.londonheliport.co.uk

Map
- Location in Greater London

Runways
Direction	Length		Surface
Direction	m	ft	Surface
02/20	38 × 16	125 × 52	Concrete
- Sources: UK AIP at NATS

London Heliport (ICAO: EGLW), previously called Battersea Heliport and renamed on 1 August 2019 to the Edmiston London Heliport, is London's only licensed heliport. The facility, which was built by W. & C. French and opened on 23 April 1959, is located in Battersea on the south bank of the River Thames, 3 NM (5.6 km; 3.5 mi) southwest of Westminster Bridge and between Wandsworth Bridge and Battersea Railway Bridge.

== Operations ==
Prior to the official opening, the first aircraft to land at the heliport on 8 April 1959, was a Westland Widgeon Series 2, owned by Westland Aircraft.

The heliport, once owned by Westland and then Harrods, is a very small site, making use of a jetty to provide a helipad for take-off and landing, and onshore parking for three to four aircraft, depending upon their size. The heliport provides landing, parking and refuelling services between 08:00 and 21:00 (flights are permitted between 07:00 and 23:00), albeit parking is normally restricted to smaller helicopter categories.

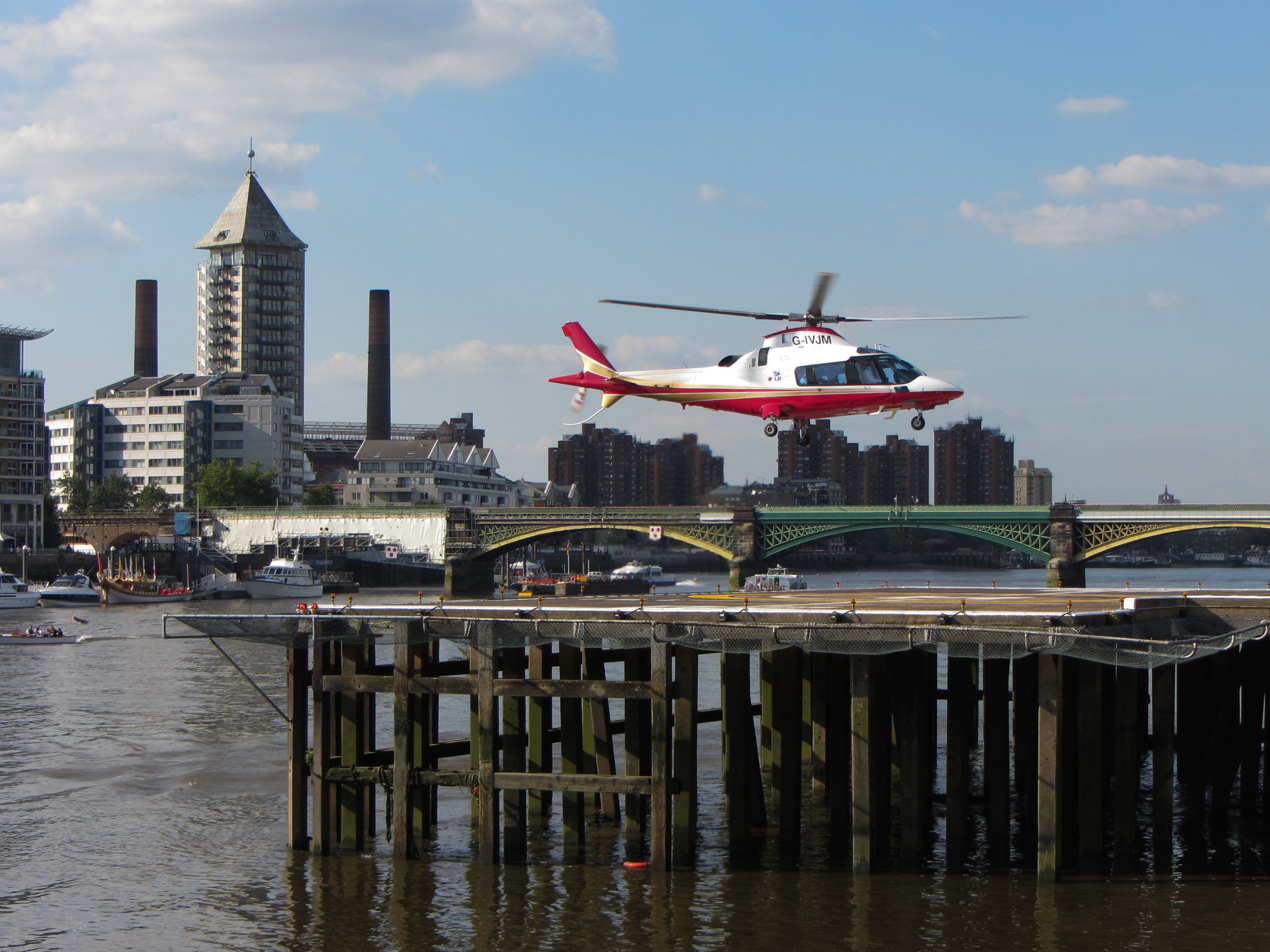
A helicopter landing at London Heliport. Battersea Railway Bridge is seen in the background.

Flight conditions and procedures at the heliport prescribe a circuit height 1,000 ft (305 m) above the Thames, in an extended figure-of-eight over the water, to seek to minimise noise pollution for residents in the area and to constrain flight operations to over the river, away from the built-up area. Ground running of rotors is restricted to a maximum of five minutes for the same reason.

In 2003 London Heliport was acquired by Weston Homes. In 2012 it was bought by the Reuben Brothers, who also own London Oxford Airport, for £35 million.

Edmiston announced in August 2019 that they would be taking over the title sponsorship of the heliport with a restyling of the interior & exterior areas as well as repainting the helicopter landing apron.

The nearest main line railway station is Clapham Junction and the nearest London Underground station is Fulham Broadway.

== Accidents and incidents ==
On 16 January 2013 a Agusta A109 helicopter outbound from Redhill attempting to divert to London Heliport due to poor weather conditions at Elstree in adverse weather collided with a construction crane and then crashed into the street, killing the pilot and one person on the ground. This was the first fatal helicopter crash anywhere near the heliport since records began in 1976.

London Heliport has a fully licensed rescue and firefighting service who are on duty for all aircraft movements at the port as well as providing an emergency response to any helicopter incident within the London area. The Heliports Fire Service also conducts regular training alongside their colleagues in the London Fire Brigade and RNLI and offer training in helicopter emergencies to any emergency service.

== See also ==
- Airports of London - Wikipedia
