= Ebitimi Banigo =

Nigerian banker

Ebitimi Banigo is a Nigerian banker who was chief executive of International Merchant Bank of Nigeria from 1981 to 1986. Between 1999 and 2000, he was Minister of Science and Technology in Nigeria.

Banigo briefly worked for the accounting firm of Peat Marwick, Cassleton Elliott & Company before traveling abroad to earn an undergraduate degree in economics from University at Buffalo and later earned an MBA from Harvard University. Between 1976 and 1978, he worked with Citicorp in New York working on international loan syndication and services, in 1979, he moved across the Atlantic and joined Chase Merchant Bank working from its London office. Chase has an affiliate in Nigeria that later became Continental Merchant Bank, Banigo was transferred to the Nigerian affiliate in 1980. Upon his return to Nigeria, he briefly worked with the local branch of Chase Merchant Bank as the corporate finance manager. In 1980, he left Chase to become deputy managing director of International Merchant Bank and in 1981, he became the banks's MD. Banigo was at the helm of IMB for five years.

In 1988, Banigo and a group of investors started Allstates Trust Bank. In the 2000s, the bank's license was suspended and Banigo was detained by the Economic and Financial Crimes Commission on the recommendation of the Central Bank which audited the bank's financial records and alleged Banigo and his associated companies were extended loan facilities amounting to more than 35% of shareholder equity, a violation of the Bank and Other Financial Institutions Act (BOFIA) of 1991.

In 2012, he became the Amanyanabo of Okpoama Kingdom, a traditional title making him King of Okpoama kingdom of Brass Local Government.
