= Ebitimi Agogu =

Nigerian footballer

Agogu, Ebitimi
Personal information
- Full name: Agogu, Ebitimi
- Date of birth: 26 December 1987 (age 38)
- Place of birth: Otuan, Nigeria
- Height: 1.67 m (5 ft 5 1/2 in)
- Position: Forward

Team information
- Current team: Bayelsa United F.C.
- Number: 10

Senior career*
Years	Team	Apps	(Gls)
2008–2010	Bayelsa United	28	(9)
2007	→ Ocean Boys F.C. (loan)		
2010	Sharks	26	(7)
2011–2012	Shooting Stars	15	(3)
2011	→ Ocean Boys F.C. (loan)		
2013	Nembe City F.C.		
2014–	Bayelsa United F.C.		
- * Club domestic league appearances and goals

Ebitimi Agogu (born 26 December 1987 in Otuan, Bayelsa State is a footballer, who plays for Bayelsa United F.C.

== Career ==
Agogu who started his professional career with Bayelsa United and signed for Sharks F.C. of Port Harcourt in 2010, after two successful seasons with the side that won the 2010 WAFU Cup in Togo, he signed for Shooting Stars F.C. but was later loaned to Ocean Boys F.C. the same season. In January 2012 returned to Sharks He left Shooting Stars F.C. in January 2013and signed with Nembe City before returning to Bayelsa United at the start of the 2014 season.
