= Peat, Marwick, Casselton Elliott & Co =

Peat, Marwick, Cassleton Elliott & Co was an accounting firm in West Africa that is now part of KPMG. It was the first expatriate accounting firm established in British West Africa.

The history of the firm dates back to the 1920s when Edward Cassleton Elliott and as assistant opened a branch of Cassleton Elliott in Jos to service the accounts of foreign tin mining firms. When Lagos emerged as a commercial center, a business center was added in the city. This was soon followed by a new business center in Accra. The firm also opened offices in The Gambia and Freetown, Sierra Leone. As pioneer chartered accountants, the firm managed the audits of most expatriate firms in the country including the major banks, Barclays DCO and Bank of British West Africa, while it also set the foundation and style of accounting practices in Nigeria. In the 1940s and 1950s, the firm was also the training site for accountancy students who were on government scholarships.

In Ghana the firm's activities also initially centered around European companies. In 1937, a change in law allowed private firms to audit government finances. Cassleton Elliott soon took control of auditing government agencies and departments in Ghana.

In the 1960s, Peat Marwick and Cassleton Elliott merged. In the 1970s, African professional began to assume senior positions within the firm and gradually the expatriate owners began to hand over control to Africans. Some of the local branches changed the business name, in Ghana it became Peat, Marwick, Okoh & Co and in Nigeria, the firm became Peat, Marwick, Ani & Ogunde. The later was then managed by Anthony Ani and Otunba Ogunde.
