= Vauxhall =

District of London

Coordinates: 51.4903°N 0.1193°W

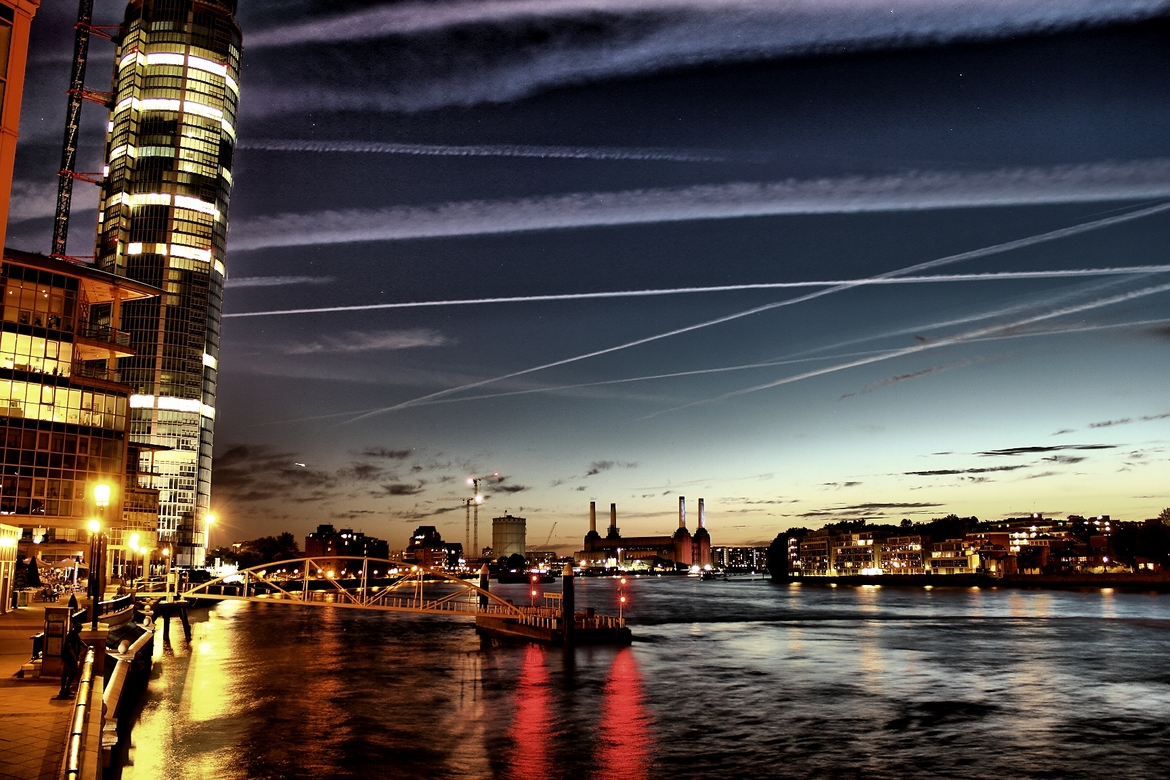
- River Thames looking upstream from Vauxhall Bridge showing (left) St George Wharf Tower and (centre) Battersea Power Station, and the shorelines, left to right, of Vauxhall, Nine Elms, Battersea and Pimlico

- Location within Greater London
- Population: 14,262 (Princes ward, 2011)
- OS grid reference: TQ305785
  - Charing Cross: 1.59 mi (2.6 km) NNE
- London borough: Lambeth
- Ceremonial county: Greater London
- Region: London
- Country: England
- Sovereign state: United Kingdom
- Post town: LONDON
- Postcode district: SW8
- Dialling code: 020
- Police: Metropolitan
- Fire: London
- Ambulance: London
- UK Parliament: Vauxhall and Camberwell Green
- London Assembly: Lambeth and Southwark

Vauxhall (/ˈvɒks(h)ɔːlˌ -əl/ VOKS-(h)awl, -əl) is an area of South London, within the London Borough of Lambeth. Named after a medieval manor called Fox Hall, it became well known for the Vauxhall Pleasure Gardens.

From the Victorian period until the mid-20th century, Vauxhall was a mixed industrial and residential area, of predominantly manual workers' homes – many demolished and replaced by Lambeth Council with social housing after the Second World War – and business premises, including large railway, gas, and water works. These industries contrasted with the mostly residential neighbouring districts of Kennington and Pimlico. As in neighbouring Battersea and Nine Elms, riverside redevelopment has converted most former industrial sites into residential properties and new office space.

Vauxhall has given its name to the Vauxhall Bridge, Vauxhall parliamentary constituency and Vauxhall Motors.

== Geography ==
Vauxhall is 2.1 km (1.3 mi) south of Charing Cross and 1.5 km (0.93 mi) southwest of the actual centre of London at Frazier Street near Lambeth North tube station. Vauxhall is adjacent to the River Thames, on the opposite side of the river to Pimlico. To the north is the district of Lambeth and to the southeast is the district of Kennington. Nine Elms, South Lambeth and Stockwell are to the south of Vauxhall.

Several roads converge at an area known as Vauxhall Cross, where Vauxhall station on the South West Main Line and the bus station are located. To the northeast of Vauxhall Cross is the Vauxhall Pleasure Gardens and to the southeast is the large Vauxhall Park.

Vauxhall was part of Surrey until 1889, when the County of London was created.

== Politics ==
Vauxhall is within the London Borough of Lambeth. For the 2022 council election, the area became part of the Vauxhall ward, which elects three members of Lambeth London Borough Council.

For Westminster elections, Vauxhall is part of the Vauxhall and Camberwell Green constituency which was created in 2024 to replace the Vauxhall constituency. Florence Eshalomi has held the seat since 2019 for the Labour and Co-operative Party.

== History ==
A map showing the Vauxhall ward of Lambeth Metropolitan Borough as it appeared in 1916

=== Toponymy ===
For a list of street name toponymies in the district see Street names of Vauxhall.

The toponymy of Vauxhall is generally accepted to have originated in the late 13th century, from the name of Falkes de Breauté, the head of King John's mercenaries, who owned a large house in the area, which was referred to as Faulke's Hall, later Foxhall, and eventually Vauxhall. Samuel Pepys mentions "Fox Hall" in his diary on 23 June 1665: "....I took boat and to Fox Hall, where we spent two or three hours talking of several matters very soberly and contentfully to me, which, with the ayre and pleasure of the garden, was a great refreshment to me, and, ‘methinks, that which we ought to joy ourselves in." The area only became generally known by the name Vauxhall when the Vauxhall Pleasure Gardens opened as a public attraction and movement across the Thames was facilitated by the opening of Westminster Bridge in the 1740s.

==== In the Russian language ====
Competing theories are given as to why the Russian word for a central railway station is вокзал (vokzal), which coincides with the canonical 19th-century transliteration of "Vauxhall". It has long been suggested that a Russian delegation visited the area to inspect the construction of the London & South Western Railway (L&SWR) in 1840, and mistook the name of the station for the generic name of the building type—a "vaux hall", as it were. This was further embellished into a story that Tsar Nicholas I of Russia, visiting London in 1844, was taken to see the trains at Vauxhall and made the same mistake. Alternatively, the locality of the L&SWR's original railway terminus, Nine Elms Station, was shown boldly and simply as "Vauxhall" in the 1841 Bradshaw timetable.

Both these explanations can probably be dismissed, since the first public railway in Russia had already been built by 1837. This line ran from Saint Petersburg via Tsarskoye Selo to Pavlovsk Palace, where extensive pleasure gardens had earlier been established. In 1838, a music and entertainment pavilion was constructed at the railway terminus. This pavilion was called the Vokzal in homage to the Vauxhall Pleasure Gardens in London. The name soon came to be applied to the station itself, which was the gateway that most visitors used to enter the gardens. It later came to mean any substantial railway station building (a different Russian word, станция (stantsiya), is used for minor stations).

The word voksal (воксал) had been known in the Russian language with the meaning of "amusement park" long before the 1840s and may be found, e.g. in the poetry of Aleksandr Pushkin: На гуляньях иль в воксалах / Легким зефиром летал ("To Natalie" (1813): "At fêtes or in voksals, /I've been flitting like a gentle Zephyrus" [here "Zephyrus" is an allegory of a gentle, warm and pleasant wind ]) According to Vasmer, the word is first attested in the Saint Petersburg Vedomosti for 1777 in the form фоксал, which may reflect the earlier English spelling of Fox Hall/Faukeshall. Englishman Michael Maddox established a Vauxhall Gardens in the Saint Petersburg suburbs (Pavlovsk) in 1783, with pleasure gardens, a small theatre/concert hall, and places for refreshment. Archdeacon William Coxe describes the place as a "sort of Vauxhall" in that year, in his Travels into Russia.

=== Early history ===
No mention of Vauxhall is made in the 1086 Domesday Book. The area originally formed part of the extensive manor of South Lambeth, which was held by the family of de Redvers, feudal barons of Plympton in Devon and Lords of the Isle of Wight. Falkes de Breauté acquired South Lambeth in 1216 when he married Margaret FitzGerold, widow of Baldwin de Redvers (son and heir apparent of William de Redvers, 5th Earl of Devon (d.1217)) and mother of Baldwin de Redvers, 6th Earl of Devon (1217–1245). Falkes de Breauté's lands reverted to the de Redvers family after his death in 1226. In 1293, South Lambeth and the manor of "la Sale Faukes" passed, probably by trickery, to King Edward I, who purchased several de Redvers lands (including the Lordship of the Isle of Wight) from Isabel de Forz, 8th Countess of Devon (1237–1293), sister and heiress of Baldwin de Redvers, 7th Earl of Devon (1236–1262), shortly before her death. In 1317 King Edward II granted the manor of Vauxhall, Surrey, to Sir Roger d'Amory for his "good services" at the Battle of Bannockburn.

From various accounts, three local roads – the South Lambeth Road, Clapham Road (previously Merton Road), and Wandsworth Road (previously Kingston Road) – were ancient and well-known routes to and from London.

Vauxhall was the south western terminus of the Civil War defences of London, thrown up by Londoners in 1642 to defend against Royalist incursions. A landmark fort was located at the present site of the Elephant and Castle public house (currently a Starbucks).

=== Development ===
The land was flat and parts were marshy and poorly drained by ditches, and only started to be developed with the draining of Lambeth Marsh in the mid-18th century, but remained a village. Prior to this, it provided market garden produce for the nearby City of London. Vauxhall Bridge and Vauxhall Bridge Road were opened in 1816. By 1860, the village had been subsumed by the town of Lambeth. Many of Vauxhall's streets were destroyed during the construction of the railway to London Waterloo via the Nine Elms to Waterloo Viaduct, by German bombing in World War II or ravaged through poor city planning.

== Demography ==
The explosion in London property prices during the late 1990s and early 2000s has led to a boom in riverside construction, such as the large St George Wharf development by Vauxhall Bridge. This area is continuing to be redeveloped with several newbuilds under construction.

Several gentrified areas have developed, and areas of terraced townhouses on streets such as Fentiman Road and Heyford Avenue have higher property values in the private market; however, 97% of housing stock in Vauxhall is flats, both conversions and purpose-built blocks. Vauxhall is also a popular residential area for members of parliament and civil servants due to its proximity to the Houses of Parliament and Whitehall; Kennington is within the area wired for the Commons' Division bell. Some 18th- and 19th-century properties also survive – most famously Bonnington Square, a community that emerged from the 1970s–1980s squat scene in London and remains as mostly housing co-operatives today.

Vauxhall is a very ethnically diverse area; 50% are white and 50% of residents originate from a non-white ethnic group. There is a significant Portuguese community, some with a connection to Madeira; many Portuguese restaurants and bars are located in South Lambeth Road and the surrounding area.

The 2021 census states the plurality of residents, 39.5% are Christians and 37.3% state that they do not have a religion. The Muslim community consists of 9.3% of residents.

== Economy ==
Much of the area in Vauxhall contains light industry, offices, and government buildings. Many companies and organisations were attracted in the past by Vauxhall's central location and comparatively cheap rent compared to Westminster on the other side of the river. In recent years, Vauxhall's riverside has undergone major redevelopment with the construction of a number of modern residential and office blocks, most notably the distinctive SIS Building at Vauxhall Cross. Also, a number of new commercial businesses have moved into the area.

== Nightlife ==
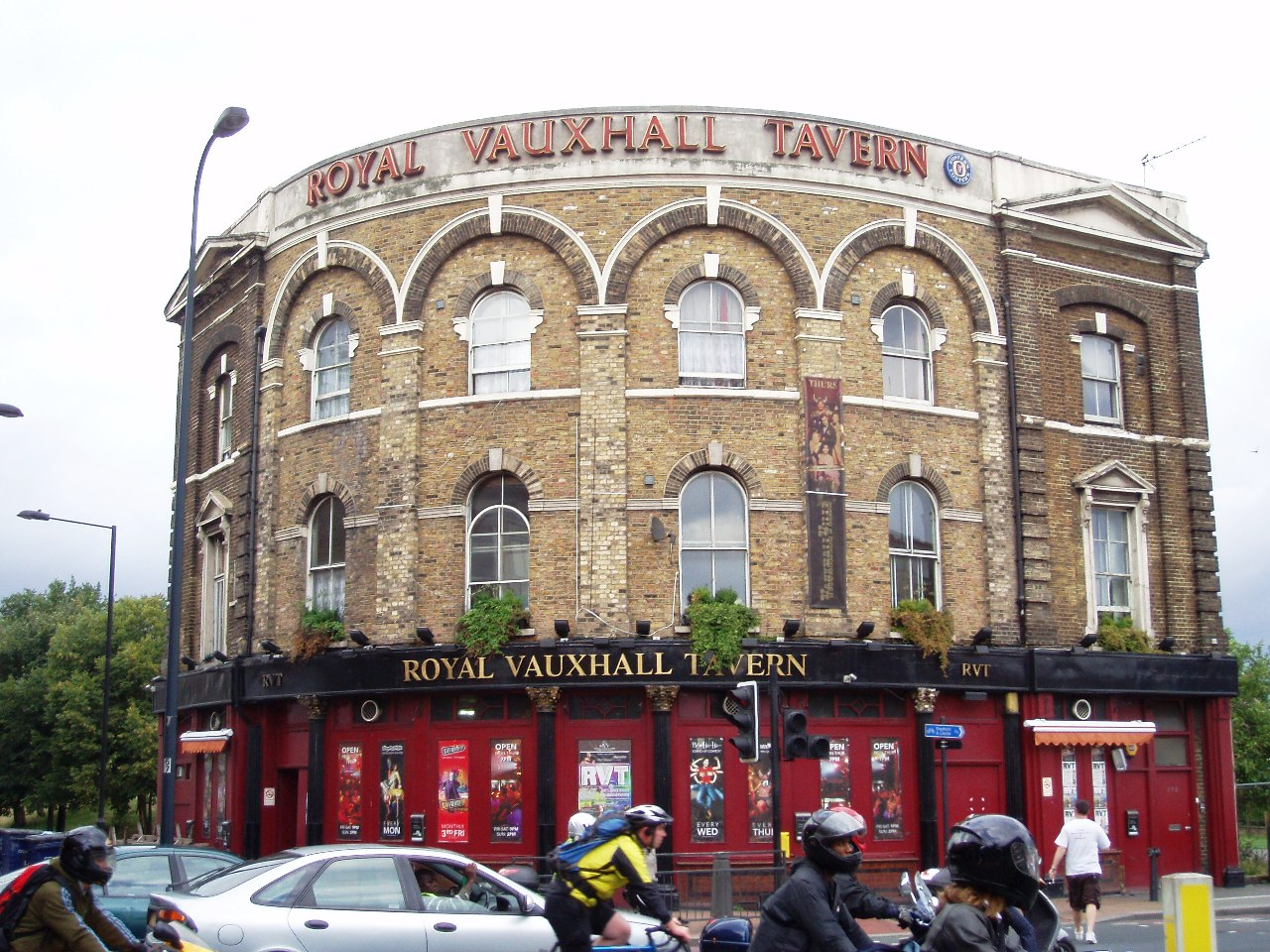
The Royal Vauxhall Tavern, a well-known gay venue

Vauxhall is home to a number of gay bars and nightclubs, such as Fire, The Eagle, and the Royal Vauxhall Tavern, which dates back to at least the late 19th century, and was for many years a traditional English music hall and cabaret venue. In recent years, the building has come under constant threat of buyout and demolition from property developers, as it stands alone on a prime piece of grassland adjacent to Vauxhall railway station. However, the pub was bought in 2004 by sympathetic owners who have announced, "business as usual".

Vauxhall was originally the home of the more underground gay clubs with the arrival of Crash in the 1990s. Over the years, more clubs and gay businesses have followed Crash's lead by opening up in the railway arches underneath the main line out of Waterloo station. One of the most notable venues to open in the area is Fire night club, which is located on Parry Street and currently occupies ten arches. Fire was the scene of a drugs raid by the Metropolitan Police Service on 28 April 2007 where nine people were arrested. The tactics used in the raid (namely photographing all the persons leaving the venue) were strongly criticised by the gay press at the time.

Before Vauxhall earned its reputation as a gay village, it was regarded among the underground gay club scene as the place to go to avoid the more commercial nights elsewhere in central London. However, the market has become more and more lucrative with the arrival of more venues and more nights, and Vauxhall has been criticised as becoming increasingly commercial, diluting its once underground appeal. The demise of other club venues in London, such as Turnmills, the Astoria and The Fridge, have led to the gay club scene becoming more centralised in Vauxhall, turning it into an alternative destination from Soho for gay people to socialise. Vauxhall has also become colloquially known as "Voho" (a portmanteau of the names Vauxhall and Soho) within the gay community, due to the emergence of Vauxhall as a gay village after Soho.

Entertainment in the Vauxhall area is not exclusively aimed at gay clientele; the oldest strip pub in London (the Queen Anne) sitting at Vauxhall Walk has now closed to be replaced with The Tea House Theatre, a 1940s-themed tea room.

== Features ==
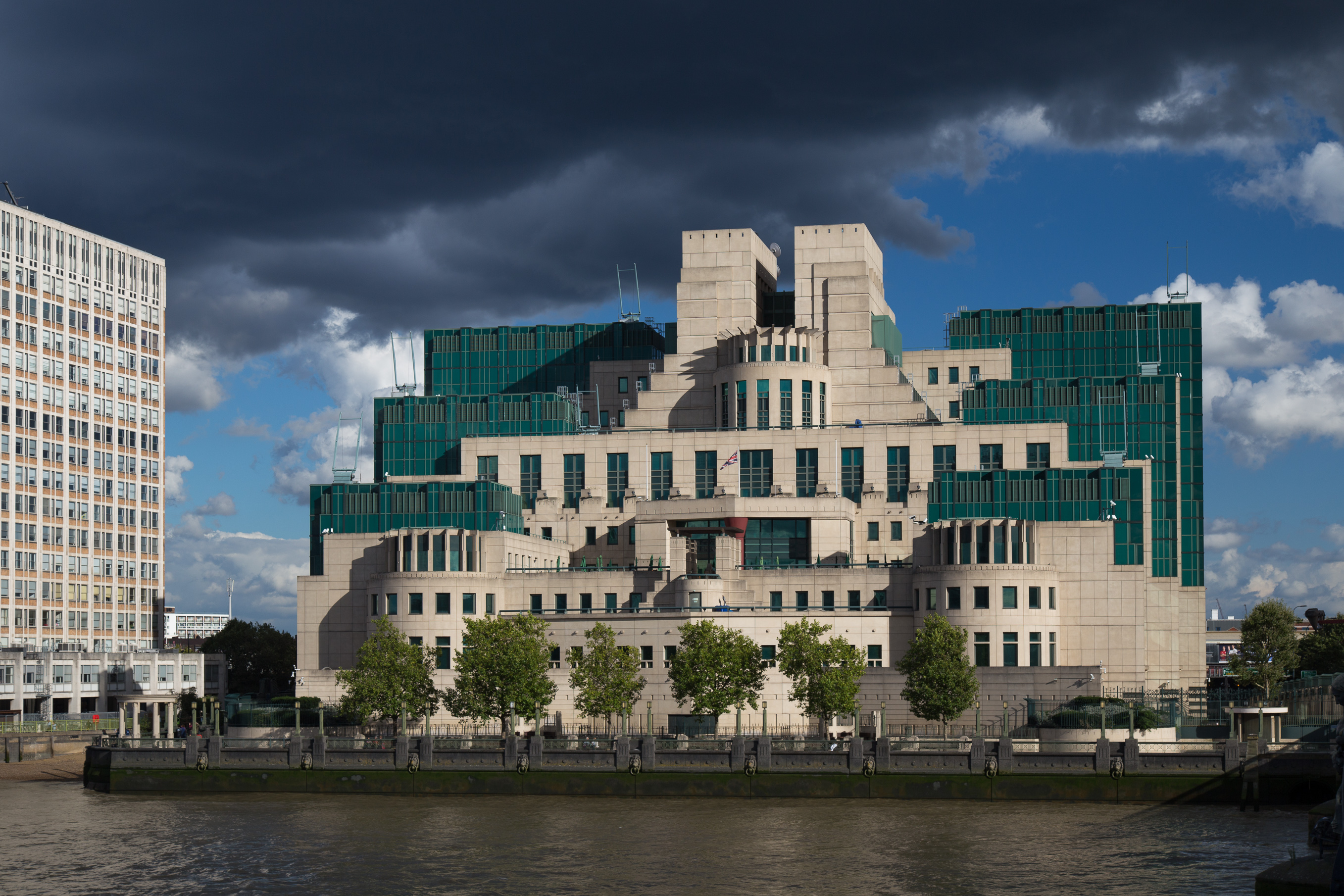
The Vauxhall Cross headquarters of the Secret Intelligence Service

Vauxhall Cross, the fictional Tube station featured in James Bond films

By Vauxhall Bridge stands the central headquarters of the British Secret Intelligence Service (more commonly referred to as MI6), which occupies offices built between 1989 and 1992 and commonly referred to as Vauxhall Cross. Since 1992, a large complex of apartments and offices has been built to the south of Vauxhall Bridge at St George Wharf. Part of this development includes the St George Wharf Tower, completed in 2014.

The MI6 building has featured in several James Bond films, initially filmed without permission, but then condoned by then Foreign Secretary Robin Cook with his memorable "After all James Bond has done for Britain..." quip. It appears in GoldenEye, The World Is Not Enough (wherein it suffers a fictional terrorist attack that prefigured a genuine incident), Die Another Day, Skyfall (where it also comes under a fictional terrorist attack), and Spectre (2015) (wherein it is demolished). Die Another Day featured a fictional London Underground station, Vauxhall Cross, a fictional closed stop on the Piccadilly line now employed by MI6 as an extension to its HQ. (In fact, the Piccadilly line does not come south of the river at all; only the Victoria line passes anywhere nearby, and the secret entrance to the station shown in the film is on the east side of Westminster Bridge, some considerable distance downriver.)

Vauxhall is also home to Brunswick House, a listed Georgian mansion and former home to the Dukes of Brunswick. Built in 1758, it once stood in three acres of riverside parkland; now it sits overshadowed by the St George Wharf complex. The building was in a state of disrepair and was on the English Heritage 'Buildings at Risk' list until the London Architectural Salvage and Supply Company (LASSCO) acquired it in 2004 and restored it as a premises from which to sell architectural salvage. It also has a restaurant and is an events venue.

St Peter's Church, Vauxhall in Kennington Lane was designed by the 19th-century architect John Loughborough Pearson, who also designed Truro Cathedral and St John's Cathedral, Brisbane in Australia, as well as being responsible for restoration work at Rochester, Bristol, Peterborough, and Lincoln cathedrals. As of 2015, the church building serves as a community centre and arts venue, as well as a church. Next to St Peter's is Vauxhall City Farm.

== Transport ==
Vauxhall is well connected even by central London standards. London Underground, National Rail trains, and London buses are all available at Vauxhall station. The tube stop is on the boundary of zones 1 and 2 of the London Travelcard area on the Victoria line, and Northern line stations are within walking distance of many parts of Vauxhall, though the nearest is Nine Elms. The railway station is served by South Western Railway to and from London Waterloo, which is one stop away. Vauxhall bus station has 14 routes serving various parts of London. There is also a river bus service operated by Thames Clippers at Vauxhall (St George Wharf) Pier, enabling passengers to travel east to Greenwich and Barking, or west to Putney.

Vauxhall is one of London's most well-connected transport hubs, as the availability of underground, trains, and buses has given Vauxhall the highest possible PTAL rating of 6b at its centre.

In addition to public transport, Vauxhall is accessible by major roads and the Thames Path pedestrian and bicycle trail. Vauxhall also has two 17-space Santander Cycles docking stations and Cycle Superhighway 7 runs through the area.

=== Vauxhall Cross ===
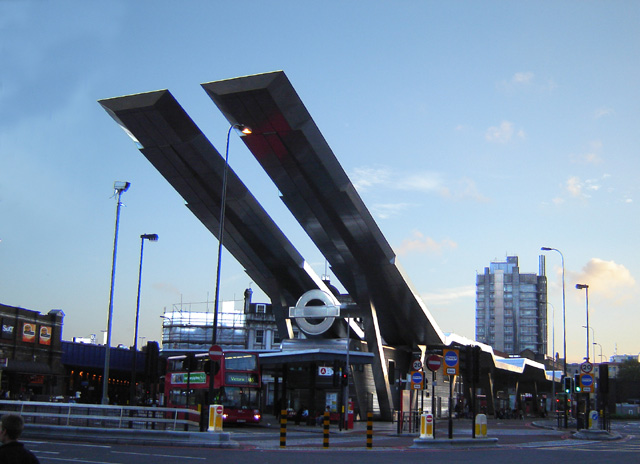
The Vauxhall Cross transport interchange, 2005: The solar panels supply energy for 60% of the bus station's lighting.

Vauxhall Cross is immediately to the southeast of Vauxhall Bridge, where six major roads converge, including the Albert Embankment, which exits the Cross to the north and is the southernmost point of entry into the London congestion charge area. Vauxhall Cross was once described as "one of the most unpleasant road junctions in South London" in Nikolaus Pevsner's 1983 architectural guide to South London. Vauxhall Cross has since improved after a gradual redesign between 2002 and 2004, to accommodate a bus interchange linked to the Vauxhall mainline railway and tube stations, both of which are located to the southeastern end of the Cross.

Work has involved design changes to traffic lanes, improved pedestrian and cycle crossings, refurbishment of walkways beneath the mainline railway viaduct, and the construction of a bus station, completed in December 2004 featuring an undulating steel-frame canopy and ribbed steel walls. An interesting feature of the canopy is a series of photoelectric cells generating electricity to offset the energy used by the bus station.

Vauxhall Cross bus station will be redeveloped to create a new mixed-use development consisting of offices, hotels, and shopping areas. The project will be managed by Great Marlborough Estates and has an apparent budget of £600 million, and is estimated to make the developers over £45 million. Public consultation took place in 2016 but the project has been delayed.

=== Nearest tube stations ===
- Vauxhall
- Nine Elms
- Kennington
- Oval
- Pimlico
- Stockwell

== Community facilities ==
Vauxhall Park contains an area of miniature model houses (also in Fitzroy Gardens, in Melbourne, Australia) as well as tennis courts, day care in the "one o'clock club", and children's playground. It is open daily for recreation and has an "open day" once a year.

Vauxhall City Farm, located within Vauxhall Pleasure Gardens is open daily and contains a range of animals including alpacas, sheep, goats and pigs.

Vauxhall is the home of Vauxhall Gardens Estate Residents and Tenants Association (VGERTA) that represents 2,500 residents in Vauxhall Gardens Estate which is the biggest Presidents and Tenants Association in Lambeth. VGERTA and their committee has received a number of awards for their contributions to the local community. VGERTA's biggest success to date is the fundraising of £165,000 for the full regeneration of the Glasshouse Walk Playground that was successfully completed in July 2013.

== See also ==
- Love Lambeth
- Vauxhall Civic Society
- Vauxhall glassworks
- Vauxhall One
- Vauxhall Now
