= Odonymy in the United Kingdom =

British road naming conventions

Odonymy refers to the street or road naming conventions in the toponymy of the United Kingdom.

== History ==
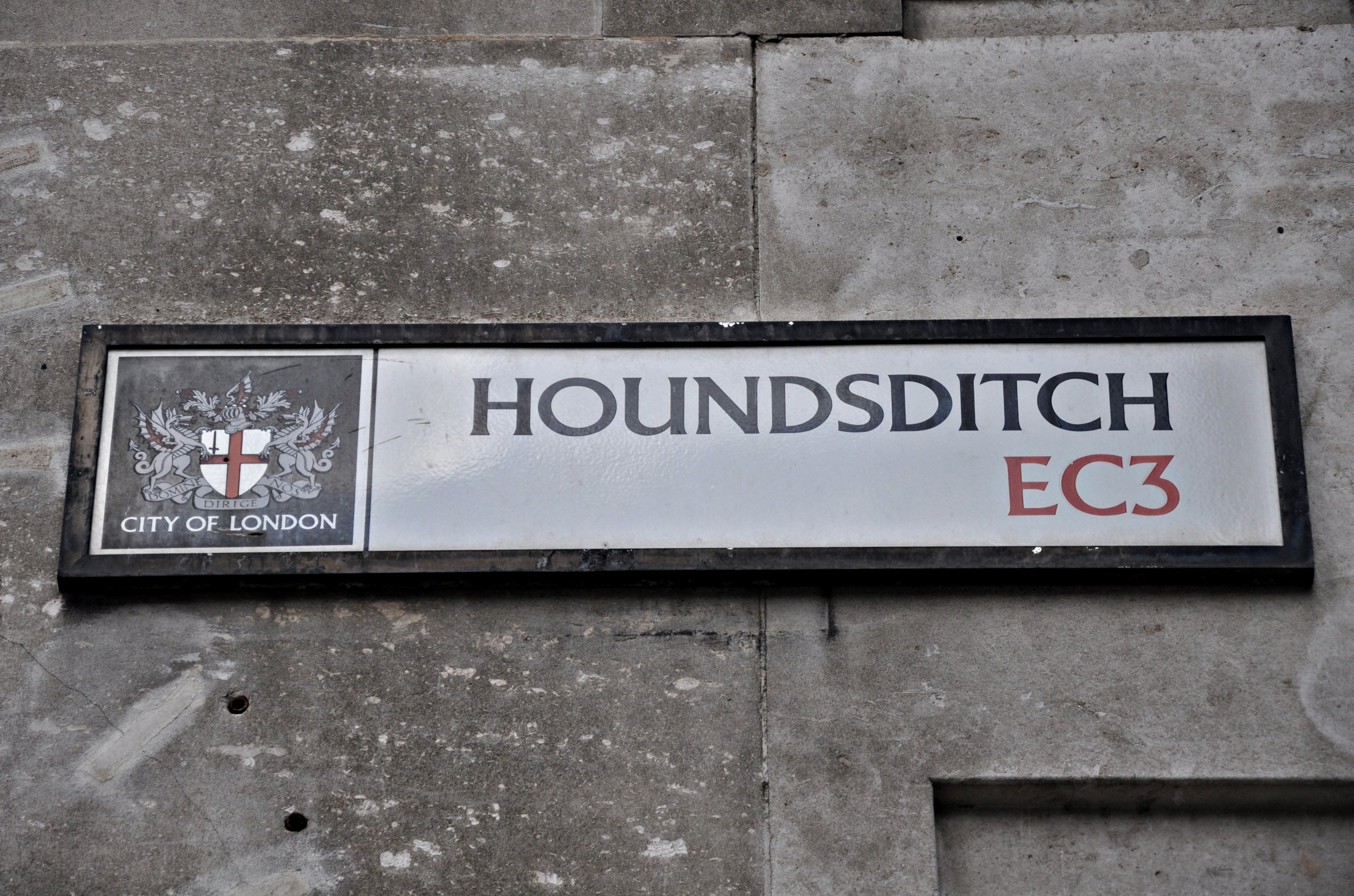
Houndsditch, an example of a street name with no suffix in the City of London

Many towns will refer to their main thoroughfare as the High Street (particularly in England) or Main Street (in Scotland) and many of the ways leading off it will be suffixed "Road".

Scottish-specific terms include Wynd for a narrow lane between houses, and similarly Close in Edinburgh.

In the City of London, according to tradition, there are no "Roads"; all the streets there are called "Street", "Lane", "Court", "Hill", "Row" or "Alley", or have no suffix (e.g. Cheapside). This is because the word "road" did not come to its current definition until around the 16th century. However, boundary changes in 1994 put part of Goswell Road in the City of London.

One of many Alma Roads

Millions of new houses were built in the Victorian and Edwardian era, during which time some streets were named after the Crimean War particularly Alma but also Raglan; and the Second Boer War e.g. Ladysmith, Mafeking and Kimberley.

There are over 500 streets named "Queen" and a further 500 for "Victoria". There are at least 500 streets named "King" and the same for "George".

== Culture ==
Some older road names that were created in an innocuous or matter-of-fact way, and that were accepted at that time, are nowadays considered rude e.g. Gropecunt Lane.

== List ==
=== London ===
- Street names of Belgravia
- Street names of Bloomsbury
- Street names of Clerkenwell and Finsbury
- Street names of Covent Garden
- Street names of Fitzrovia
- Street names of Holborn
- Street names of Kennington and Lambeth
- Street names of Lisson Grove
- Street names of Marylebone
- Street names of Mayfair
- Street names of Pimlico and Victoria
- Street names of Regent's Park
- Street names of Sheffield
- Street names of Soho
- Street names of Southwark
- Street names of the City of London
- Street names of Vauxhall
- Street names of Waterloo
- Street names of Westminster

== See also ==
- Odonymy
- Odonymy in France
- Lists of roads in the United Kingdom
- List of road junctions in the United Kingdom
