= Thorley =

Thorley may refer to:

== Places ==
- Thorley, Hertfordshire, England
- Thorley, Isle of Wight, England

== People with the surname Thorley ==
- Di Thorley, Australian politician
- John Thorley (disambiguation), multiple people, including:
  - John Thorley (MP), (fl. 1397), English politician
  - John Thorley (George M. John Thorley), (1927–2005), Welsh rugby union and rugby league footballer
  - John Thorley (classicist) (1940 – 2026), British classicist, philologist and educator
- Ollie Thorley, English rugby player
- Wilfrid Thorley, English poet
- William Yan Thorley (born 2002), Hong Kong marathon swimmer

== People with the given name Thorley ==
Thorley is a rare unisex given name. People with that name include:

Real people

- Thorley Walters (1913-1991), English actor
- Thorley Smith (1873-1940), Britain's first Parliamentary candidate to stand on a platform of women's suffrage

Fictional characters

- Thorley "Thor" Callum, main female character in Raoul Walsh's 1947 film Pursued
