= Street names of Southwark =

Origin of street names in London district of Southwark

This is a list of the etymology of street names in the London district of Southwark (also called Borough). The area has no formally defined boundaries – those utilised here are: the river Thames to the north, Tower Bridge Road to the east, Bricklayers Arms/New Kent Road/Elephant and Castle to the south, and London Road/St George's Circus/Blackfriars Road to the west.

== A ==
- Abbey Street – after Bermondsey Abbey, formerly located here
- Alderney Mews
- Alice Street
- America Street
- Angel Place – formerly Angel Alley, both after a former inn here of this name
- Arch Street
- Archie Street
- Avon Place
- Avonmouth Street – unknown; formerly Devonshire Street
- Ayres Street – after Alice Ayres, local resident who died whilst saving the lives of three children in a house fire in 1885

== B ==
- Baden Place
- Bank End and Bankside – both after former earthen banks built to protect against the Thames
- Barnham Street
- Bartholomew Street – after a former hospital located near here run by St Bartholomew's Hospital
- Bath Terrace
- Battle Bridge Lane – after medieval landowners the abbots of Battle
- Bear Gardens and Bear Lane – both after the sport of bear baiting formerly practised here
- Becket Street – after Thomas Becket, murdered Archbishop of Canterbury, by association with the pilgrims who went this way to Canterbury
- Bedale Street – after Bedale, Yorkshire; it was formerly York Street after Prince Frederick, Duke of York and Albany but was changed in 1891 to avoid confusion with similarly named streets; further back still it was Foul Lane, a descriptive epithet
- Bedford Row
- Bell Yard Mews
- Belvedere Buildings and Belvedere Place
- Bermondsey Square and Bermondsey Street – understood to mean 'Beornmund's island'; but, while "Beornmund" represents an Old English personal name, identifying an individual once associated with the place, the element "-ey" represents Old English "eg", for "island", "piece of firm land in a fen", or simply a "place by a stream or river". Thus Bermondsey need not have been an island as such in the Anglo-Saxon period, and is as likely to have been a higher, drier spot in an otherwise marshy area.
- Bickels Yard
- Bittern Street
- Blackfriars Road – named after Blackfriars Bridge in 1769/70; it was formerly Great Surrey Street, reflecting the traditional county it is in
- Black Horse Court – after a former inn here of this name
- Black Swan Yard – after a former inn here of this name
- Blue Lion Place
- Borough High Street, Borough Road and Borough Square – after the ancient Borough of Southwark
- Bowling Green Place – after an 18th-century bowling green located here
- Boyfield Street – after Josiah Boyfield, local landowner and clothmaker
- Braidwood Street – after 19th century fireman James Braidwood
- Brew Wharf Yard
- Bricklayers Arms – after a former coaching inn here of this name
- Bridge Yard – presumably with reference to the nearby London Bridge
- Brinton Walk
- Brockham Street – unknown; formerly Church Street
- Brunswick Court
- Burbage Close – after Richard Burbage, noted Shakespearian actor
- Burge Street
- Burrell Street
- Bursar Street – after William Waynflete, Bishop of Winchester in the 15th century; he left an endowment of local property to the college

== C ==
- Caleb Street
- Calvert's Buildings – after Felix Calvert, 18th century brewer here
- Canvey Street – after Canvey Island in Essex; it was formerly Essex Street
- Cardinal Bourne Street – after Francis Bourne, Bishop of Southwark in the late 19th century
- Cardinal Cap Alley – after a former inn or brothel here, called either the Cardinal's Cap or Hat
- Carmarthen Place
- Castle Yard – after a former inn here of this name
- Cathedral Street – after the adjacent Southwark Cathedral
- Chaloner Court
- Chancel Street
- Chapel Court
- Chettle Close
- City Walk
- Clennam Street
- Clink Street – after The Clink prison formerly located here
- Cluny Place – after Bermondsey Abbey, initially established as a Cluniac order
- Coach House Mews
- Cole Street
- Collinson Street and Collinson Walk – after the Collinson family, noted for their active interest in local and church affairs in the 19th century
- Collinwood Street
- Copperfield Street – after the novel David Copperfield by Charles Dickens, by association with Dickens Square
- Cottons Lane
- Counter Street – corruption of compter (small prison), as the borough's compter formerly stood here
- County Street
- Crosby Court and Crosby Row
- Crucifix Lane – after the former Cross of Bermondsey located here; it was destroyed in 1559

== D ==
- Davidge Street
- Decima Street
- Deverell Street
- Dickens Square – after Charles Dickens, who spent part of his childhood here
- Disney Place and Disney Street
- Dolben Street – after John Dolben, 17th century archbishop; it was formerly George Street
- Dorrit Street and Little Dorrit Court – after the novel Little Dorrit by Charles Dickens, by association with Dickens Square
- Doyce Street
- Druid Street – possibly after a former inn here with ‘Druid’ in its name
- Duchess Walk
- Duke Street Hill – named for Arthur Wellesley, 1st Duke of Wellington, 19th century military figure
- Dunsterville Way

== E ==
- Elephant and Castle – derived from a coaching inn of this name
- Elim Street
- Emerson Street – after Thomas Emerson, 15th century local benefactor
- English Grounds – thought to be after the English workers here during the railway boom, who were kept separate from the Irish ones nearby at Irish Grounds
- Ewer Lane

== F ==
- Fair Street – after the former Horselydown Fair held here
- Falmouth Road
- Farnham Place
- Fenning Street
- Flatriron Square and Flatiron Yard

== G ==
- Gaitskell Way
- Gambia Street – unknown; formerly William Street
- Gatehouse Square
- Gaunt Street
- George Inn Yard – after the adjacent George Inn
- Gibbon's Rents
- Glasshill Street – after the former glassworks located here; formerly just Hill Street
- Globe Street – after the former inn here of this name, possibly named for the Globe Theatre
- Great Dover Street – as this formed part of the traditional London to Dover road
- Great Guildford Street – after Suffolk House, owned by Lady Jane Guildford in the early Tudor period; possibly also in allusion to Guildford, county town of Surrey
- Great Maze Pond – after the Medieval Maze Manor here, named for a prominent maze in its grounds
- Great Suffolk Street – after Suffolk House, home to Charles Brandon, 1st Duke of Suffolk in the Tudor period
- Great Yard
- Green Dragon Court – after a Tudor-era inn here of this name
- Green Walk
- Grotto Court – after Thomas Finch's Grotto Grounds, 18th century pleasure grounds located near here
- Guildable Bridge Street – the term ‘Guildable’ is first recorded in 1377, refers to the collection of taxes there and was adopted to distinguish this from the other manors of the Southwark area
- Guinness Court
- Guy Street – after Thomas Guy, founder of Guy's Hospital

== H ==
- Haddon Hall Street – after Haddon Hall, local religious mission named for Charles Haddon Spurgeon, noted Victorian-era preacher
- Hamlet Way
- Hankey Place – after Donald Hankey, prominent member of the local Edwardian-era charitable organisation the Oxford and Bermondsey Club
- Hardwidge Street – after James Hardwidge, local 18th century needlemaker and church benefactor
- Harper Road – unknown; it was changed from Union Road to avoid confusion with similarly named streets, and before that it was Horsemonger Lane, after the local horse dealers
- Hatchers Mews
- Hay's Lane – after the Hays family, who owned nearby Hay's Wharf
- Holland Street – after a former manor house here called Holland's Leaguer, possibly named from its owner's family name
- Holyrood Street – after the former Rood (cross) of Bermondsey located here; it was destroyed in 1559
- Hopton Street and Hopton's Gardens – after Charles Hopton, who funded the local almshouses here in the 18th century
- Horsemongers Mews – probably by association with the nearby Horsemongers Lane (now Harper Road)
- Hulme Place
- Hunter Close

== I ==
- Invicta Plaza
- Issac Way

== J ==
- Joiner Street
- Jubilee Walkway – named in 1977 to commemorate the Silver Jubilee of Queen Elizabeth II

== K ==
- Kell Street
- Kentish Buildings – after 17th century property owner Thomas Kentish; formerly it was Christopher Alley, after an inn of this name
- Keppel Row – after Augustus Keppel, 1st Viscount Keppel, 18th century naval figure
- Keyworth Place and Keyworth Street – after Leonard James Keyworth, recipient of a Victoria Cross in the First World War
- King James Court and King James Street
- King's Bench Street – after the King's Bench Prison formerly located here
- King's Court
- King's Head Yard – after a former inn here of this name
- King's Place
- Kipling Street
- Kirby Grove

== L ==
- Lamb Walk – after a 17th-century inn here of this nam
- Lancaster Street – unknown; formerly Union Street
- Lansdowne Place
- Lant Street – named after Thomas Lant, local 17th century landowner
- Lavington Street – after Thomas Lant, local 18th century developer
- Law Street
- Leathermarket Court and Leathermarket Street – after the tanneries and leather market formerly located here
- Leigh Hunt Street – after the author Leigh Hunt, who served a short sentence in a nearby prison
- Library Street
- Lockyer Street
- Loman Street – after the former Loman's Pond located here
- London Bridge Street and London Bridge Walk – after the adjacent London Bridge
- London Road
- Long Lane – presumably simply descriptive

== M ==
- McCoid Way
- Magdalen Street – after either William Waynflete, Bishop of Winchester in the 15th century, who attended Magdalen College, Oxford, or a 13th-century church here called St Mary Magdalen
- Maiden Lane
- Maidstone Buildings Mews
- Manciple Street – after the character of the manciple in Geoffrey Chaucer's Canterbury Tales, by reference to the adjacent Pilgrimage Street
- Market Yard Mews
- Marshalsea Road – after the former Marshalsea Prison here
- Meadow Row
- Melior Place and Melior Street – after Melior May Weston, local 18th century property owner
- Mermaid Court – after a former inn here of this name
- Mermaid Row
- Merrick Square – after local 17th century landowner Christopher Merrick
- Middle Road
- Middle Yard
- Milcote Street
- Mint Street – after a Tudor-era royal mint located here
- Montague Close – after Montague House formerly located here, named for Anthony Browne, 1st Viscount Montagu
- More London
- Morgan's Lane
- Morocco Street – named for the local Morocco leather industry
- Mulvaney Way

== N ==
- Nebraska Street
- Nelson Square – after Admiral Horatio Nelson
- Neckinger – derived from 'Devil's Neckcloth', a colloquial term for the hangman's noose, by association with the execution of pirates at St Saviour's Dock in the 18th century
- Newcomen Street – after the local Newcomen Charity, named for its 17th century founder; it was formerly King Street, after a local inn of this name
- New Globe Walk – after the Globe Theatre
- Newham's Row
- Newington Causeway and Newington Court – Newington is a now almost obsolete name for the Elephant and Castle area; it means ‘new village/farmstead’ and dates to the early Middle Ages
- New Kent Road – as this formed the traditional route down to Kent; the ‘New’ section dates from 1751, and is an extension of the Old Kent Road
- Nicholson Street

== O ==
- O’Meara Street – after Daniel O’Meara, priest at St George's Cathedral, Southwark
- Ontario Street
- Oxford Drive

== P ==
- Pardoner Street – after the character of the pardoner in Geoffrey Chaucer's Canterbury Tales, by reference to the adjacent Pilgrimage Street
- Park Street – after a former park here attached to Winchester House
- Pepper Street
- Perkins Square
- Pickford Lane
- Pickwick Street – after the novel The Pickwick Papers by Charles Dickens, by association with Dickens Square
- Pilgrimage Street – as this formed part of the ancient pilgrimage route to Canterbury
- Plantain Place
- Playhouse Court
- Pocock Street – after the locally prominent Pocock family
- Porlock Street
- Porter Street
- Potier Street
- Potters Fields – so called as it was previously a burial ground - a potter's field - for unknown, unclaimed or indignant people. Coincidentally, there was also Roman pottery found near here
- Price's Street – after a local builder of this name
- Prioress Street – after the character of the prioress in Geoffrey Chaucer's Canterbury Tales, by reference to the adjacent Pilgrimage Street

== Q ==
- Queen Elizabeth Street
- Queen's Head Yard – after a former grammar school here named for Queen Elizabeth I
- The Queen's Walk – named in the 1977 to commemorate the Silver Jubilee of Queen Elizabeth II
- Quilp Street – after Daniel Quilp, a character in the novel The Old Curiosity Shop by Charles Dickens, by association with Dickens Square

== R ==
- Railway Approach – descriptive, after the adjacent London Bridge station
- Redcross Way – after either the Redcross burial ground formerly located here or an inn of this name
- Rephidim Street
- Risborough Street
- Robinson Road
- Rochester Walk – after a former house here owned by the bishops of Rochester
- Rockingham Street
- Roper Lane
- Rose Alley – after the Tudor-era Rose Theatre
- Rotary Street
- Rotherham Walk
- Rothsay Street
- Royal Oak Yard
- Rushworth Street – after 17th century politician John Rushworth, who was imprisoned for a period at the nearby King's Bench Prison

== S ==
- St George's Circus – as this area was formerly called St George's Fields, after St George the Martyr, Southwark church; the circus opened in 1770
- St Margaret's Court – named for the former St Margaret's church here; it was for a period known as Fishmonger's Alley, as it belonged to the Worshipful Company of Fishmongers
- St Olaf Stairs – probably for the former St Olave's grammar school located here
- St Thomas Street – after St Thomas’ Hospital, formerly located here
- Sanctuary Street – as the local mint formerly here claimed the local area as a sanctuary for debtors
- Sawyer Street – after Bob Sawyer, a character in the novel The Pickwick Papers by Charles Dickens, by association with Dickens Square
- Scoresby Street – unknown; formerly York Street
- Scovell Crescent and Scovell Road – after the Scovells, local business family
- Shad Thames – most likely a corruption of 'St John at Thames', by reference to the Knights Hospitaller of St John, who owned land here in the medieval period; a rival theory derives it from the shad fish once caught in this stretch of the river
- Shand Street – after Augustus Shand, member of local Board of Works in the late 19th century; it was formerly College Street, by association with the nearby Magdalen Street
- Shipwright Yard
- Silex Street
- Silvester Street
- Snowfields
- Southall Place
- Southwark Bridge Road and Southwark Street – the name Suthriganaweorc or Suthringa geweorche is recorded for the area in the 10th-century Anglo-Saxon document known as the Burghal Hidage and means "fort of the men of Surrey" or "the defensive work of the men of Surrey". Southwark is recorded in the 1086 Domesday Book as Sudweca. The name means "southern defensive work" and is formed from the Old English sūth and weorc. The southern location is in reference to the City of London to the north, Southwark being at the southern end of London Bridge
- Sparrick's Row
- Spurgeon Street – after Charles Spurgeon, noted Victorian-era preacher
- Stainer Street – after John Stainer, prominent Victorian-era organist
- Staple Street
- Sterry Street – after the Sterry family, local business owners in the 18th–19th centuries
- Still Walk
- Stonemasons Court
- Stones End Street – as this marked the point where the paved surface of Borough High Street ended in former times
- Stoney Street – formerly Stony Lane, both simply descriptive names
- Sturge Street
- Sudrey Street
- Sumner Buildings and Sumner Street – after Charles Sumner, Bishop of Winchester in the 19th century
- Surrey Row – after the traditional county here of Surrey
- Swan Street – after a former inn here of this name

== T ==
- Tabard Street – after a former inn here of this name
- Talbot Yard – a corruption of the Tabard Inn, as above
- Tanner Street – after the tanneries formerly located here; it was formerly Five Foot Lane, after its narrow dimension
- Tarn Street
- Tay Court
- Tennis Street – after tennis courts formerly located here
- Theobald Street
- Thomas Doyle Street – after Thomas Doyle, a key figure in the building of St George's Cathedral, Southwark
- Thrale Street – after the Thrale family, who owned a brewery here in the 17th century
- Tiverton Street
- Tooley Street – corruption of St Olave's Church, Southwark, which formerly stood here
- Toulmin Street – after the Toulmin family, prominent figures in local business and church affairs
- Tower Bridge Road – as it leads to Tower Bridge
- Trinity Church Square and Trinity Street – after Trinity Church here
- Trio Place
- Trundle Street
- Tyers Gate

== U ==
- Union Street – thought to be as it linked two other streets

== V ==
- Vine Lane – thought to be after a former vineyard here
- Vine Yard – thought to be after a former inn here called the Bunch of Grapes
- Vinegar Yard – after the vinegar distilleries formerly located here

== W ==
- Wallis Alley
- Wardens Grove
- Weavers Lane – probably after weavers formerly working from here
- Webber Street
- Weller Street – after Sam Weller, a character in the novel The Pickwick Papers by Charles Dickens, by association with Dickens Square
- Weston Street – after local 19th century property owner John Weston
- White Hart Yard – after a former inn here of this name
- Whites Grounds
- Wild's Rents
- Winchester Square and Winchester Walk – after Winchester House, formerly the London house of the Bishop of Winchester

== X ==
...

== Y ==
...

== Z ==
- Zoar Street – after the former Zoar Chapel here, named for the Biblical Zoara
