= John Thorley (disambiguation) =

John Thorley may refer to:

- John Thorley (George M. John Thorley), (1927–2005), Welsh rugby union and rugby league footballer
- John Thorley (classicist) (1940–2026), English classicist, philologist and educator
- John Thorley (MP), (fl. 1397), English politician.
