= Toponymy of England =

The toponymy of England derives from a variety of linguistic origins. Many English toponyms have been corrupted and broken down over the years, due to language changes which have caused the original meanings to be lost. In some cases, words used in these place-names are derived from languages that are extinct, and of which there are no known definitions. Place-names may also be compounds composed of elements derived from two or more languages from different periods. The majority of the toponyms predate the radical changes in the English language triggered by the Norman Conquest, and some Celtic names even predate the arrival of the Anglo-Saxons in the first millennium AD.

The place-names of England, as in most other regions, typically have meanings which were significant to the settlers of a locality (though these were not necessarily the first settlers). Sometimes these meanings have remained clear to speakers of modern English (for instance Newcastle and Sevenoaks); more often, however, elucidating them requires the study of older languages. As the names lost their original meanings either due to the introduction of a new language or linguistic drift, they gradually changed, or were appended with newer elements. An example is Breedon on the Hill in Leicestershire, whose name seems to have grown by the accretion of elements from three different languages at different times in its history, all emphasising the hill.

== Origins ==
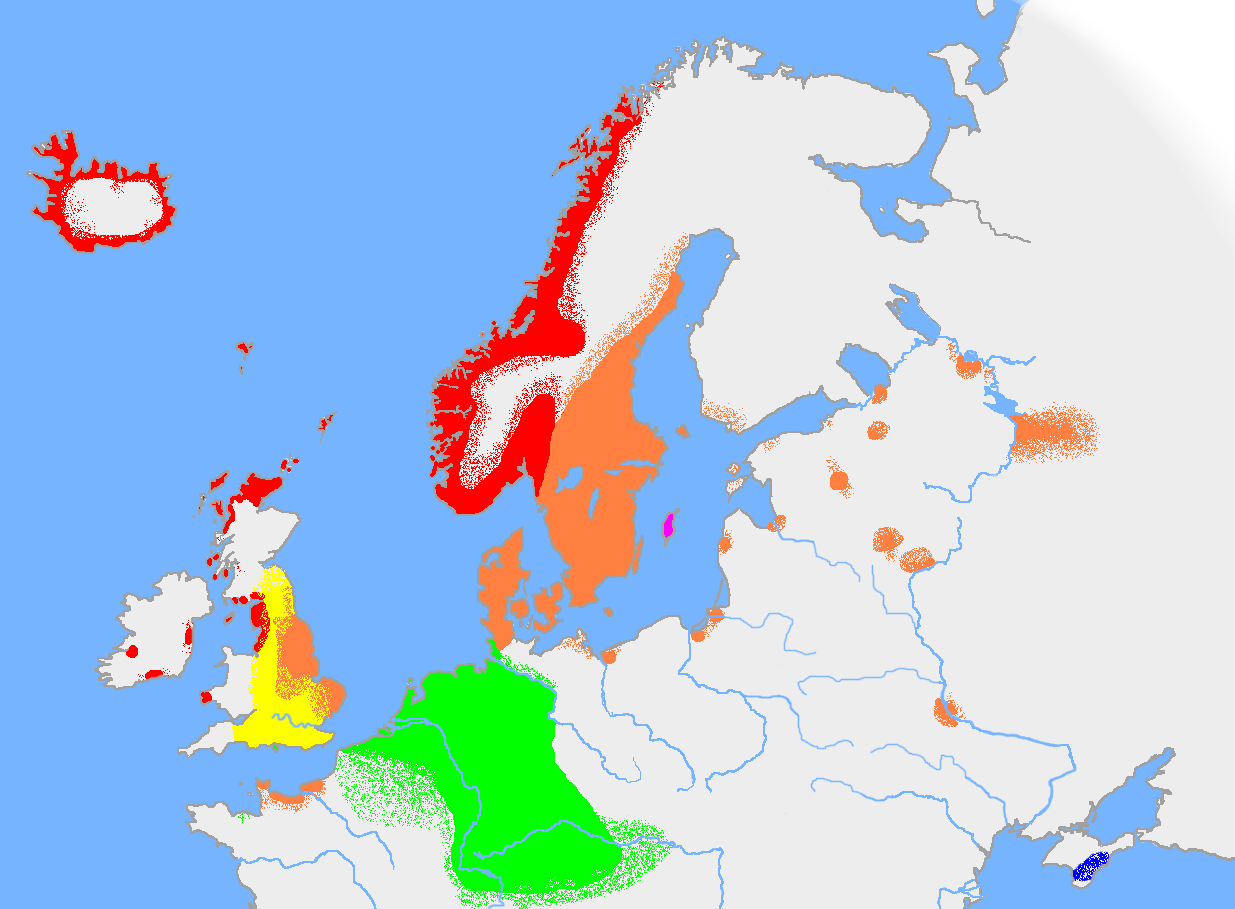
The western (red) and eastern (orange) dialects of Norse in the 10th century, with the related Germanic (yellow and green). In Britain and Ireland white denotes Celtic.

The place-names of England have diverse origins, largely due to historical changes in language and culture. These affected different regions at different times and to different extents. The exact nature of these linguistic/cultural changes is often controversial, but the general consensus is as follows.

The British Isles were inhabited during the Stone and Bronze Ages by peoples whose languages are unknown. During the Iron Age, the population of Great Britain shared a culture with the Celtic peoples inhabiting western Europe. Land use patterns do not appreciably change from the Bronze Age, suggesting that the population remained in situ. The evidence from this period, mainly in the form of place-names and personal names, makes it clear that a Celtic language, called Common Brittonic, was spoken across what came to be England by the Late Iron Age. At what point these languages spread to, or indeed developed in, the area is open to debate, with the majority of estimates falling at some point in the Bronze Age.

The principal substrate of British toponyms is thus Celtic in origin, and more specifically Brittonic ('British'), ancestral to modern Welsh and more distantly related to the Goidelic languages of Ireland and Scotland. The oldest place-names in England appear to be the names of rivers, many of which are interpreted as being Brittonic in origin. In the areas of England in which Brittonic languages were not replaced until relatively recently (Cumbria, Cornwall) many settlement names are still essentially Brittonic.

After the Roman conquest, many Latinate place-names appear, particularly associated with military settlements. Often, these were simply a Latinisation of existing names, including Verulamium for Verlamion (St Albans) and Derventio for Derwent (Malton). After the collapse of Roman Britain, few of these place-names survived. These settlements often continued to be inhabited so known by later names; many are marked as Roman strongholds by the suffix chester/cester/caster (an Old English borrowing from the Latin castra = camp), seldom drawing on the Roman/Romano-Celtic name. The influence of Latin on British place-names is thus generally only slight.

Following the end of the Roman Empire, several Germanic tribes living along the north sea coast began to migrate to Britain, variously displacing, intermarrying with, or ruling over local populations. The language of these settlers (which would become Old English) came to be spoken over much of lowland Britain. Due to this replacement of tongue and population growth, most settlement names in modern England are discernibly Old English in origin. A large proportion of them contain personal names from the settlers and their descendants.

Some English place-names commemorate non-Christian religions, referring instead to the old Germanic religion: see List of non-Christian religious place-names in Britain.

A few centuries later, around AD 850–1050, the north and east of England were settled by Danish and Norwegian 'Vikings'. Many toponyms in these areas are thus of Old Norse origin. Since Old Norse had many similarities to Old English, there are also many hybrid English/Norse place-names in the Danelaw, the part of England that was under Danish rule for a time. Norse toponyms also frequently contain personal names, suggesting that they were named for a local chieftain.

After the Norman invasion of England in 1066, some Norman French influences can be detected in place-names, notably the simplification of ⟨ch⟩ to ⟨c⟩ in Cerne and -cester, and suffixes of names of feudal lords as in Stoke Mandeville, or Church/Kirk/Bishop(s) (prefixed) or Episcopi/Abbot(t)s (rarely prefixed) in many cases of belonging to the church. The toponymy of England has remained relatively stable since the early Norman period, though the names have been generally simplified, harmonised to modern sounds and 'weathered' to modern forms.

== Languages ==
Many languages have shaped and informed the nomenclature of England: various Celtic languages (including Brythonic, Goidelic (Old Irish), Welsh and Cornish (in the South West), Latin, Anglo-Saxon, Old Norse, Norman French and others.

=== Pre-Celtic ===
As the first written records of travellers to Britain date to the end of the first millennium BC, the languages of Britain prior to the arrival of Celtic-speakers are unknown. It is certain that some form of pre-Indo-European 'Old European' language, or more probably, languages, were spoken on the island prior to the arrival of peoples speaking Indo-European languages in Europe. These languages have left no record, and so identifying their possible traces in British toponymy is described by Richard Coates as "looking for needles in a haystack even though we are unsure exactly what needles look like and suspect that the haystack contains a few things which look a bit like what needles might look like."

Theo Vennemann suggests that, prior to the arrival of Indo-European languages, Europeans may have spoken languages related to Basque and the Afroasiatic languages. Coates suggests that some British island and River names may derive from these languages, giving the English examples of Thanet, Scilly, Humber and Severn. There is also evidence that a pre-Celtic, but Indo-European, language provides the etymologies of various English rivers, as part of the theorised Old European hydronymy. Kitson suggests that the Derwents, the Thames, the Don and the Avons may all have a pre-Celtic origin.

=== Celtic ===
The main language spoken in Britain in the Iron Age is known as Common Brittonic, from which descend the modern languages of Cornish, Welsh and Breton. Cumbric, a now-extinct fourth descendant, was spoken in parts of northern England and lowland Scotland until the 11th century.

Brittonic place-names, or names with Brittonic elements, are extremely few in the south and east of England. Moving north and west, however, they increase substantially in frequency (for example, Crewkerne in Somerset and Morecambe in Lancashire). Cornish toponyms are overwhelmingly Celtic in origin. In Cumbria, Celtic place-names are mostly associated with natural features rather than settlements, such as the mountains Blencathra and Helvellyn.

There are some Goidelic place-names in England. However, they are far fewer in number than in Ireland or Scotland, and mostly due to the settlement of Norse-Gaels in north-west England in the 10th century.

=== Latin ===
Very few Roman names survived the end of Roman Britain in their original form, though many Roman settlements were reoccupied. These were generally renamed, although usually with the suffix caster/chester, from the Latin castra (camp). A number of Latin names survived through Celtic, such as Carlisle (cf. Welsh: caer for Latin: castra), Porthleven (compare with Latin: portus for 'harbour') and some associated with Christianity such as Eccles (compare with Latin from Greek ecclesia, 'church'). Several places contain the element street, derived from the Latin strata (paved road); these are generally on the course of a Roman road, e.g. Chester-le-Street, Stratton-on-the-Fosse. However, this word was almost certainly borrowed into the Germanic languages prior to the migration of the Anglo-Saxons into Britain, and it may have been used natively by Germanic-speaking settlers.

Other Latin elements in British place-names were adopted in the medieval period as affectations. This includes the use of magna and parva instead of the more usual Great/Little; e.g. Chew Magna, Linstead Magna and Linstead Parva. Some Latin elements are more recent still: Bognor Regis, for example, received its honorific suffix (meaning 'of the King') from George V after he convalesced there.

=== English ===
Old English was the West Germanic language brought to England and Southeastern Scotland by Germanic tribes such as the Angles, Saxons and Jutes. Old English is typically divided into the Northumbrian, Mercian, West Saxon and Kentish dialects. The language evolved into Middle English, which was used from about 100 years after the Norman Conquest until the end of the Middle Ages. Modern English is derived directly from Middle English.

The overwhelming majority of place-names in England are of Old English origin, particularly in the southeast. Many derive from the name of a particular Anglo-Saxon settler.

Commonly-occurring suffixes of Old English origin
Suffix	Origin		Examples
Suffix	Old English Word	Meaning	Examples
-ham	hām	homestead / village	Dagenham, Horsham, Swaffham
(-)ham/hamm	hamm	river meadow	South Hams, Ham, Hampton (in case given)
-ing	-ingas	people of	Reading, Worthing, Hastings
-ton	tūn	fenced enclosure	Brighton, Bolton, Preston
-bury / -b(o)rough	burh	town	Middlesbrough, Banbury, Shrewsbury
-ford	ford	ford	Bradford, Oxford, Chelmsford
-ley	lēah	clearing	Burnley, Keighley, Barnsley
-dale	dæl	valley	Borrowdale, Calderdale, many others in the Yorkshire and Derbyshire Dales, Arundel, Sunningdale

These suffixes are sometimes combined, as in Birmingham and Southampton.

=== Scandinavian languages ===
Old Norse, a North Germanic language from which both Danish and Norwegian are derived, was spoken by the Scandinavian settlers who occupied many places in the north of the British Isles during the Viking era and the splitting of England by the establishment of the Danelaw. In England, the Danes generally settled in East Anglia, East Midlands (Five Boroughs of the Danelaw, Danish Mercia) and Yorkshire (Jorvik), whilst the Norwegians settled in the northwest. The regional distribution of Norse-derived toponyms reflects these settlement patterns.

Common elements in Norse place names
Suffix	Origin		Examples
Suffix	Norse word	Meaning	Examples
-by	býr	village	Derby, Grimsby, Wetherby
-thorpe	þorp	satellite farm	Scunthorpe, Mablethorpe
-thwaite	þveit	clearing / paddock	Slaithwaite, Bassenthwaite
-toft	toft	homestead	Lowestoft

Although the languages of the Danes and Norwegians were very similar, differences between the two can be found in place-names. For instance -by and -torp are much more common in place-names of Denmark whilst toft/taft and bister/ster/bost are more common in names of Norway; all these elements essentially mean 'settlement/dwelling'.

=== Norman French ===
Due to the Norman Conquest, some place-names gained an additive, mainly a suffix, giving the names of their new owners: for example Grays Thurrock which is the rare prefix version and typical Stoke Mandeville; Stanton Lacy; Newport Pagnell. The influence often disambiguates place-names with Norman French conjunctions, such as Hartlepool (said Hart-le-pool), Chapel-en-le-Frith, Chester-le-Street. Further disambiguation occurred then and/or became the dominant form centuries later, such as Henley-in-Arden and Henley-on-Thames.

== Processes and patterns in British toponymy ==
For a general list of toponymic processes, see Place name origins.

- Back-formation: the process whereby names are derived from one another in the opposite direction to that which would be expected; for example, a river with an obsolete/forgotten name being renamed after a town on its banks, even though the river existed before the town did. The river running through Rochdale became known as the 'Roch' through this process. Cambridge, perhaps uniquely, illustrates both normal and back-formation. Originally Grontabricc, a bridge on the Granta, the name evolved through Cantebruge and then Cambrugge, from which the river was renamed Cam.
- Element order: In Germanic languages, and thus in Old English and Old Norse place-names, the substantive element is generally at the end of the name, preceded by its modifier(s); 'Badecca's water source' (Bakewell). In Celtic place-names, the order is usually the reverse, with the thing being described (hill, valley, farm etc.) as the first element: e.g. Tregonebris 'settlement (of) Cunebris' and Aberdeen 'mouth (of the) Dee'. An exception is Malvern 'bald hill'.
- Translation: The general similarity of Old Norse and Old English meant that place-names in the Danelaw were often simply 'Norsified'. For instance, Askrigg in Yorkshire, 'ash ridge'; whilst the first element is indubitably the Norse asc (pronounced "ask"), ask- could easily represent a "Norsification" of the Old English element æsc (pronounced "ash"). In this case both asc and æsc mean the same: 'ash' (tree).
- False analogy: Sometimes, however, the place-names were changed to match Norse pronunciation habits without reference to the original meaning. Thus Skipton should be 'Shipton' (Old English scipetun 'sheep farm'). However, since sh in Old English was usually cognate with sk in Old Norse, the name became changed by false analogy to Skipton, in this way losing its meaning to the Norse speakers (since the Old Norse for sheep was entirely different from the Old English), as well as rendering it obscure or unrecognizable in English.

== Problems ==
- Interpreting some names can be difficult if the reason for the name is no longer evident. Some names originally referred to a specific natural feature, such as a river, ford or hill, that can no longer be identified. For example, Whichford (Warwickshire) means "the ford on (of) the Hwicce", but the location of the ford is lost.
- The elements den (valley) and don (hill) from Old English are sometimes confused now that their meanings are forgotten or obscure; for example Croydon is in a valley and Willesden is on a hill. Their expected spellings might therefore be "Croyden" and "Willesdon".
- Another problematic element is -ey, as in Romsey. This commonly means 'island', from the Old English -eg. However, -ey can also be derived from the Old English hæg, meaning 'enclosure', as in Hornsey.
- The elements wich and wick can have a variety of meanings. Generally wich/wick/wyke indicates a farm or settlement (e.g. Keswick = 'Cheese-farm'). However, some of the sites are of Roman, or shortly post-Roman origin, in which the wich is related to the Latin vicus ('place'). These "wics" seem to have been trading posts. On the coast, wick is often of Norse origin, meaning 'bay' or 'inlet' (e.g. Lerwick).

== Toponymy by region ==
Most English place-names are Old English. Personal names often appear within the place-names, presumably the names of landowners at the time of the naming. In the north and east, there are many place-names of Norse origin; similarly, these contain many personal names. In general, the Old English and Norse place-names tend to be rather mundane in origin, the most common types being [personal name + settlement/farm/place] or [type of farm + farm/settlement]; most names ending in wich, ton, ham, by, thorpe, stoke/stock are of these types.

In Cumbria and neighbouring areas of Lancashire, Northumberland and Yorkshire, there remain a number of place-names from Cumbric, the former Brythonic language of this region, examples including Carlisle, Helvellyn and Blencathra.

Most old Roman settlements, whether actually inhabited or not, were given the title of chester/caster in Old English (from the Latin castrum for 'camp'); the specific names for each may only have little relation to the Roman names (e.g. modern Chester was actually called Deva by the Romans). Modern Winchester was Venta Belgarum, the Win- element deriving from Venta in a similar way to the names Caerwent and Gwent from Venta Silurum in south Wales.

In Cornwall, most place-names are Cornish in origin: e.g. Penzance (holy headland). In eastern Cornwall, the names show a stronger English influence. Place-names of Cornish origin are also found in the South Hams, North Devon and West Somerset. Brythonic but non-Cornish place-names, sometimes showing Cornish or Welsh influence, are found in North Somerset and parts of Dorset.

In Northern England, particularly Yorkshire and Lincolnshire, names record significant Scandinavian influence. For example, the names Howe and Greenhow (both in North Yorkshire) reflect the Old Norse word haugr meaning a hill or mound.

== See also ==
- Odonymy in the United Kingdom
- English Place-Name Society
- List of places in England
- Languages of England
- List of British places with Latin names
- Norman toponymy
- Place names in Ireland
- Scottish toponymy
- Shieling
- Welsh toponymy
- List of river name etymologies
- United Nations Group of Experts on Geographical Names
- List of generic forms in place names in Ireland and the United Kingdom with explanations and examples
- Territorial designation

== Bibliography ==
- G. B. Adams, Place-names from pre-Celtic languages in Ireland and Britain, Nomina 4 pp.46–83 (1980).
- Bradley, Henry (1910). "English place-names". Essays and studies: by members of the English Association. 1: 7–41. ISSN 1359-1746. Wikidata Q107730082.
- K. Cameron, A Dictionary of British Place Names (2003).
- R Coates, Toponymic Topics - Essays on the early toponymy of the British Isles.
- E. Ekwall, The Oxford English Dictionary of English Place-Names, Oxford University Press, Fourth Edition (1960)
- E. McDonald and J. Creswell, The Guinness Book of British Place Names (1993).
- M. Gelling, W. F. H. Nicholaisen and M. Richards, The Names of Towns and Cities in Britain (1986).
- A. D. Mills, A Dictionary of British Place Names, Oxford Paperback Reference (2003).
- W. F. H. Nicolaisen, Old European names in Britain, Nomina 6 pp37–42 (1982.
- P. H. Reaney, The Origin of English Place Names (1960).
- A. Room, A Concise Dictionary of Modern Place Names in Great Britain (1983).
- A. Room, Dictionary of World Place Names derived from British Names (1989).
- C. C. Smith, The survival of British Toponymy, Nomina 4 pp.27–41 (1980).
