= Lines of Communication =

A line of communication is the route that connects an operating military unit with its supply base.

Lines of Communication can also refer to:

- "Lines of Communication" (Babylon 5), an episode from the fourth season of the science-fiction television series Babylon 5
- Lines of Communication (London), English Civil War fortifications built around London between 1642 and 1643
