= London Road =

London Road is a popular road name in the United Kingdom. Many of these roads are so named because they form part of a wider arterial route which does indeed eventually lead to London itself.

Roads called London Road include:

== United Kingdom ==
=== England ===
There are countless London Roads in the UK. Only those significant outside their local area are listed here:

- London Road (Brighton) railway station
- London Road (Guildford) railway station
- London Road (Sheffield), Sheffield
- London Road Stadium; the home ground of Peterborough United F.C.
- Several stretches of the A4 road carry the name London Road

==== London ====
There are twenty six in London itself. They are:

- London Road, Barking, in the borough of Barking and Dagenham
- London Road, Beddington Corner, in the borough of Sutton
- London Road, Brentford, in the borough of Hounslow, part of the A315 and extends into Hounslow
- London Road, Bromley, in the borough of Bromley
- London Road, Crayford, in the borough of Bexley, and follows part of the route of the Roman Watling Street
- London Road, Croydon, in the borough of Croydon, part of the A23
- London Road, Enfield, in the borough of Enfield
- London Road, Feltham, in the borough of Hounslow. This London Road is part of the A30 and is a continuation of its Brentford cousin, having produced several other names in between
- London Road, Forest Hill, in the boroughs of Southwark and Lewisham
- London Road, Harrow, in the borough of Harrow
- London Road, Hounslow, in the borough of Hounslow. This London Road is part of the A315 and extends into Brentford
- London Road, Kingston upon Thames, in the borough of Kingston upon Thames
- London Road, Mitcham, in the borough of Merton. This London Road is part of the A217 and should not be confused with its Morden neighbour
- London Road, Morden, in the borough of Merton. This London Road is part of the A24
- London Road, Norbury, in the borough of Croydon. This London Road is part of the A23
- London Road, Romford, in the borough of Havering
- London Road, Stanmore, in the borough of Harrow
- London Road, Southwark, in the borough of Southwark
  - London Road Depot, which services the London Underground Bakerloo line, is located on and named for this London Road
- London Road, Sutton, in the borough of Sutton. This London Road is part of the A24, and is a continuation of its Morden cousin, having produced several other names in between. It extends into Epsom and Ewell, a district officially outside London
- London Road, Tooting, in the borough of Wandsworth. This London Road is a part of the A217, which also runs through Mitcham
- London Road, Thornton Heath, in the borough of Croydon. This London Road is part of the A23
- London Road, Twickenham, in the borough of Richmond upon Thames
- London Road, Wembley, in the borough of Brent

Most of the London Roads in London were named before the town they are in was absorbed by the London urban sprawl. With few exceptions, they used to be the main route from their town to London.

=== Scotland ===
- London Road, Glasgow. A large road leading to Mount Vernon to the east and Glasgow Cross to the west, passing Celtic Park and Glasgow Green on route.
- London Road, Kilmarnock
- London Road, Dumfries
- London Road, Edinburgh
- London Road, Stranraer

=== Northern Ireland ===
- London Road, Belfast. A main road leading to the city's Ormeau Park.

=== Wales ===
- London Road, Anglesey, an electoral ward in Holyhead, Anglesey

== Elsewhere ==
- London Road, Duluth, Minnesota, U.S. Minnesota State Highway 61 is on part of this road

== See also ==
- Odonymy in the United Kingdom
