= Lists of roads in the United Kingdom =

The numbering zones for A & B roads in Great Britain

These are lists of roads in the United Kingdom.

== United Kingdom ==
- List of numbered roads in the British Isles
- List of motorways in the United Kingdom
- List of primary destinations on the United Kingdom road network
- List of road projects in the UK

== Great Britain ==
In Great Britain roads are numbered according to a zonal scheme:

=== A roads ===
- Zone 1
- Zone 2
- Zone 3
- Zone 4
- Zone 5
- Zone 6
- Zone 7
- Zone 8
- Zone 9

=== B roads ===
- Zone 1
- Zone 2
- Zone 3
- Zone 4
- Zone 5
- Zone 6
- Zone 7
- Zone 8
- Zone 9

=== Other ===
- List of roads that are incorrectly numbered

== Northern Ireland ==
- List of A roads in Northern Ireland
- List of B roads in Northern Ireland

== See also ==
- Odonymy in the United Kingdom
