= List of non-Christian religious placenames in Britain =

This is a list of British place names that commemorate non-Christian religions. Many of them refer to the old Germanic religion. There are 3 types of such names:

- Places named after gods.
- Places named after temples.
- Places named after men with theophoric names, such as Thurlstone = "Thor-wolf's farmstead"; but none are listed here yet.

Note that the common English place name Thorley came from "Thorn-ley".

- Cold Higham
- Harrow on the Hill
- Harrow, London
- Harrowden, Bedfordshire
- Kirkharle
- Peper Harow
- Roseberry Topping
- Tewin
- Therfield
- Thoresway
- Thundersley
- Thundridge
- Thursby
- Tuesley
- Thursley
- Tysoe
- Wednesbury
- Wednesfield
- Weedon Bec
- Weedon Lois
- Weedon, Buckinghamshire
- Weeford
- Weeley
- Weoley Castle
- Weyhill
- Wing, Buckinghamshire
- Wingrave
- Wye, Kent

== See also ==
- List of places named after Odin
