= List of places in England =

Here is a list of places, divided by ceremonial counties of England.

== See also ==
- Toponymy of England
- List of generic forms in British place names
- List of places in the United Kingdom
- Subdivisions of the United Kingdom
- List of places in Northern Ireland
- List of places in Scotland
- List of places in Wales
- List of cities in the United Kingdom
- List of towns in England
