= Street names of Waterloo =

This is a list of the etymology of street names in the London district of Waterloo. The area has no formally defined boundaries – those utilised here are the river Thames to the north and west, Blackfriars Road to the east, and Westminster Bridge Road to the south.

- Addington Street
- Alaska Street
- Aquinas Street
- Barge House Street and Old Barge House Alley – as this was the former location of the royal barges during Tudor times and after
- Baron's Place – after the Baron family, local landowners in the 18th century
- Baylis Road – after Lilian Baylis, manager of the Old Vic in the early 20th century
- Belvedere Road – after Belvedere House and gardens, opened in 1718 on the site of what is now the Royal Festival Hall
- Blackfriars Road – named after Blackfriars Bridge in 1769/70; it was formerly Great Surrey Street, reflecting the traditional county it is in
- Boundary Row
- Brad Street
- Broadwall – after a former earthen dyke located here, marking the western boundary of the parish of Paris Gardens/Christchurch
- Burdett Street
- Burrows Mews – after the nearby Burrows Buildings, built 1770
- Chaplin Close
- Charlie Chaplin Walk – after Charlie Chaplin, famous 20th century comedian and actor, who was born in South London
- Chicheley Street – after Henry Chichele, 15th century archbishop, by connection with the nearby Lambeth Palace
- Coin Street – unknown, thought possibly after a former mint located here in the time of Henry VIII; it was formerly Prince's Street until 1893, after the Prince Regent (later George IV)
- Colombo Street – after Alexander Colombo, 19th century bailiff of the local manor of Paris Gardens
- Concert Hall Approach – as it leads to the Royal Festival Hall, built 1951
- Cons Street – after Emma Cons, manager of the Old Vic in the 1880s
- Cooper Close
- Coral Street
- Cornwall Road – as it formed part of the manor of Kennington, which belonged to the Duchy of Cornwall; it was Green Lane prior to 1815
- Cottesloe Mews
- Cranfield Row
- The Cut – as when built it cut through what was then open country/marsh
- Dibdin Row
- Dodson Street
- Doon Street
- Duchy Place and Duchy Street – as it formed part of the manor of Kennington, which belonged to the Duchy of Cornwall
- Emery Street – after the nearby Wellington Mills, which manufactured emery paper in the 19th century; prior to 1893 it was Short Street
- Exton Street
- Forum Magna Square
- Frazier Street
- Gabriel's Wharf
- Gerridge Street
- Granby Place
- Gray Street
- Greenham Close
- Greet Street
- Grindal Street – for Edmund Grindal, 16th century archbishop, by association with the nearby Lambeth Palace
- Hatfields – as fur hats were formerly made here
- Holmes Terrace
- Isabella Street
- Joan Street
- Johanna Street – possibly after local resident and subscriber to the Old Vic Johanna Serres
- Jurston Court
- Launcelot Street – after Launcelot Holland, local developer in the 1820s
- Leake Court and Leake Street – after John Leake, founder of a local hospital in 1767
- Lower Marsh – as this land was formerly a marsh prior to the 19th century
- Lower Road
- Marigold Alley – after a former 18th century inn here called the Marygold, possibly named for the flower, symbol of Mary I
- Mepham Street – after a 14th-century Archbishop of Canterbury Simon Mepeham
- Meymott Street – after the Meymott family, several of whom were stewards of Paris Gardens manor in the 19th century
- Miller Walk
- Mitre Road
- Morley Street – after Samuel Morley, benefactor of the Old Vic in the 1880s
- Murphy Street
- Paris Garden – the name of the former manor here; it may derive from ‘parish’ or the Old French ‘pareil’ (enclosure), or possibly after 15th century local family the de Parys
- Pear Place
- Pearman Street
- Pontypool Place
- The Queen's Walk – named in 1977 to commemorate the Silver Jubilee of Queen Elizabeth II
- Rennie Street – after John Rennie the Elder, prominent 18th century engineer, who designed Waterloo Bridge and Southwark Bridge
- Roupell Street – after local 19th century property owner John Roupell
- St George's Circus – as this area was formerly called St George's Fields, after St George the Martyr, Southwark church; the circus opened in 1770
- Sandell Street – after one Mr Sandell, who owned warehouses here in the 1860s
- Secker Street – after Thomas Secker, Archbishop of Canterbury 1758–68, by connection with the nearby Lambeth Palace
- Short Street – after local early 19th century carpenter Samuel Short
- South Bank – descriptive, as it is the south bank of the Thames
- Spur Road
- Stamford Street – after Stamford, Lincolnshire, hometown of John Marshall, local benefactor and churchman
- Station Approach Road – as it leads to Waterloo station
- Sutton Walk
- Tanswell Street
- Tenison Way – after Thomas Tenison, Archbishop of Canterbury 1695–1715, by connection with the nearby Lambeth Palace
- Theed Street
- Tress Place
- Ufford Street
- Upper Ground – as this was formerly a raise earth ditch between the river and Surrey marshland; formerly Upper Ground Street
- Valentine Place
- Waterloo Bridge and Waterloo Road – the road was built in 1817 shortly after the British victory over Napoleon at the Battle of Waterloo
- Webber Street
- Westminster Bridge Road – as it leads to Westminster Bridge
- West Road
- Whittlesey Street
- Windmill Walk – after the windmills formerly located here when it was countryside; formerly Windmill Street
- Wootton Street
- York Road
