= Great Suffolk Street =

Street in London, England

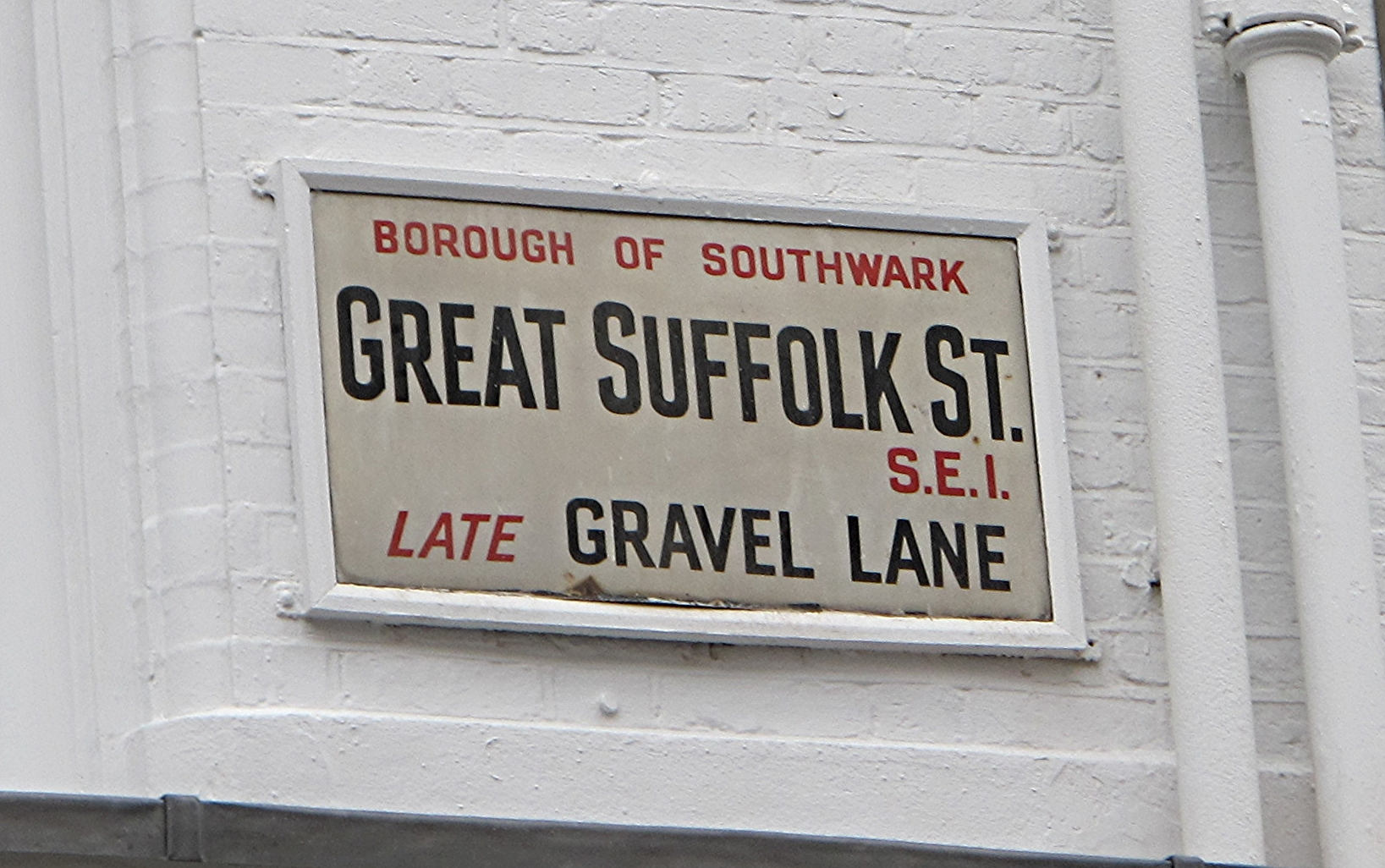
Road sign referencing the former name of part of the street.

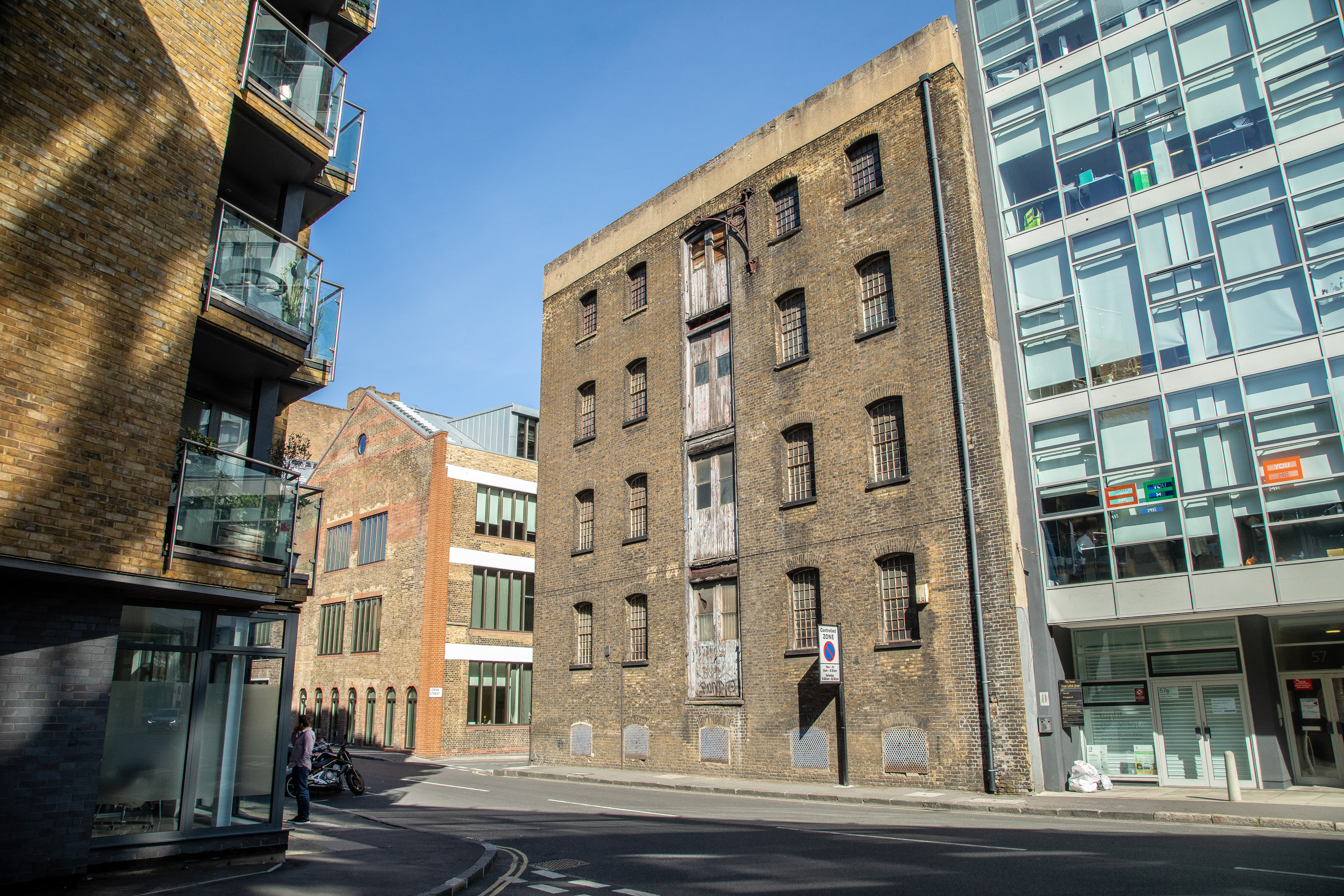
The Grade II 55 Great Suffolk Street.

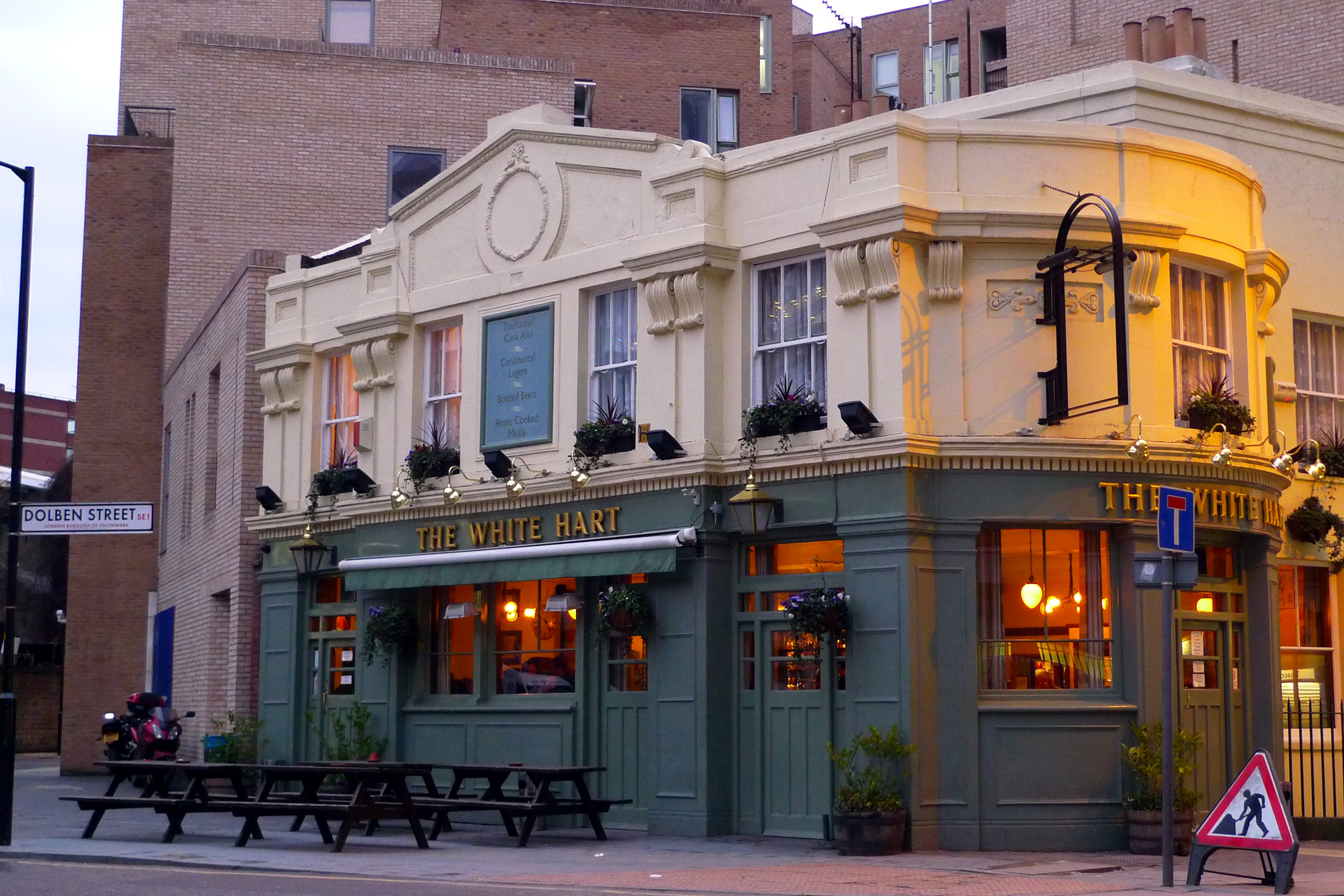
The Victorian era White Hart Inn

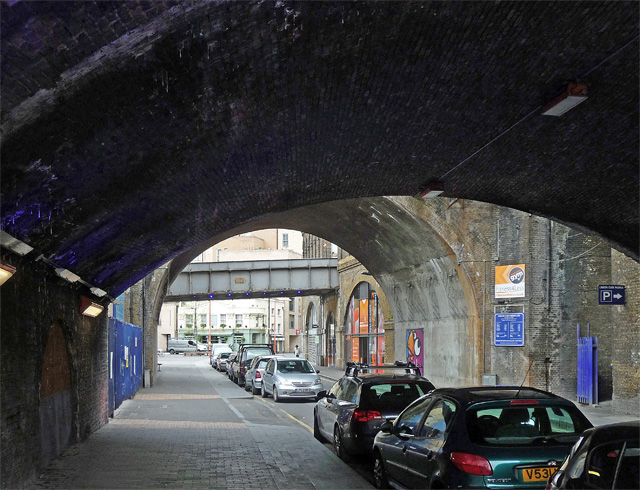
Railway viaducts on the route into London Bridge Station.

Great Suffolk Street is a street in the Southwark area of London. It runs from the north at Southwark Street to Borough High Street, crossing Union Street and Southwark Bridge Road on the way. At its southern end it becomes Trinity Street. It takes its name from the former historic residence of the Dukes of Suffolk. On John Rocque's Map in the mid-eighteenth century it is shown as Dirty Lane while its northern section continued to be known as Gravel Lane. During the English Civil War the Lines of Communication fortifications included a bulwark in Gravel Lane. The White Hart Pub was built in 1882, sharing its name with an older tavern some way to the east which was demolished in the 1870s. Its northern end is close to the Tate Modern gallery on Bankside. The Africa Centre is based in the street.

== Bibliography ==
- Bebbington, Gillian. London Street Names. Batsford, 1972.
- Cherry, Bridget & Pevsner, Nikolaus. London 4: South. Yale University Press, 2002.
