= White Hart, Southwark =

Former public house in Southwark, London

Coordinates: 51°30′17″N 0°05′24″W

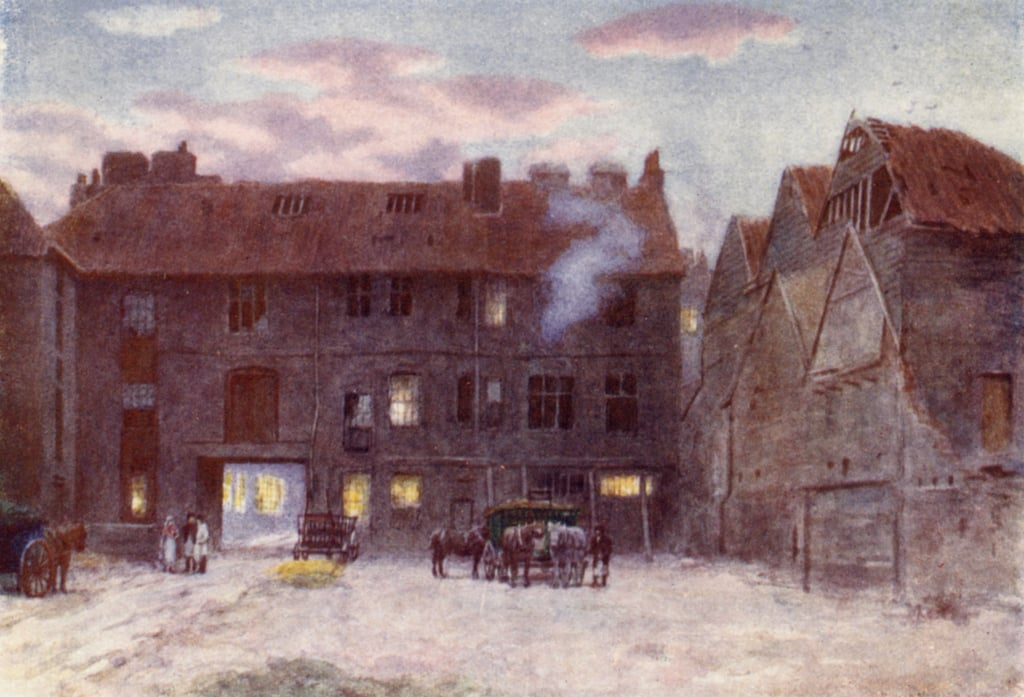
Back of White Hart Inn, Southwark by Philip Norman.

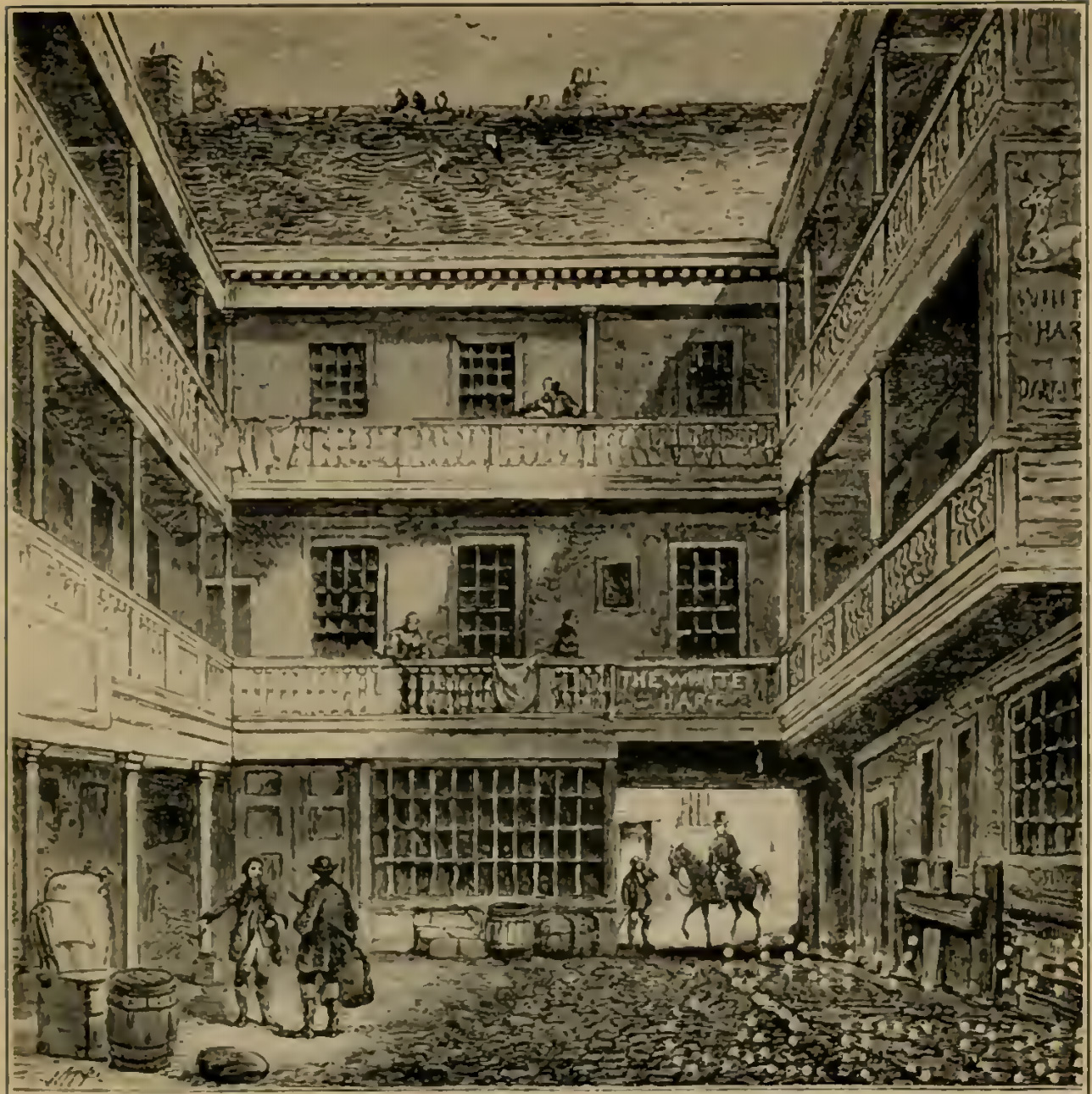

The White Hart Inn was a coaching inn located on Borough High Street in Southwark. The inn is first recorded in 1406 but likely dates back to the late fourteenth century as the White Hart was the symbol of Richard II. At the time Southwark was separate from the City of London north of the River Thames. In 1450 the inn was the headquarters of Jack Cade's Rebellion. The earlier inn was destroyed in the Great Fire of Southwark in 1676, but was rebuilt. It was located close to other coaching inns including The Tabard and The George Inn, and like the George had a galleried structure. It was demolished in 1889. A separate pub of the same name, its building still dating from the Victorian era, opened some distance to the west on Great Suffolk Street in 1882.

It appears in William Shakespeare's 1591 play Henry VI, Part 2, which concerns Cade's rebellion. In the 1836 novel Pickwick Papers by Charles Dickens, the White Hart is where Samuel Pickwick encounters Samuel Weller and employs him as his manservant. The inn's name survives in the street White Hart Yard, its former courtyard.

== Bibliography ==
- Borer, Mary Cathcart . The British Hotel Through the Age. Lutterworth Press, 2021
- Dailey, Donna & Tomedi, John. London. Infobase Publishing, 2005.
- Flude, Kevin & Herbert, Paul . The Citisights Guide to London: Ten Walks Through London's Past. Virgin Books, 1990.
- Muirhead, Finlay. London and Its Environs. Macmillan & Company, Limited, 1922.
- Wheatley, Henry Benjamin. London, Past and Present: Its History, Associations, and Traditions, Volume 3. John Murray, 1891.
- Willes, Margaret. Liberty over London Bridge: A History of the People of Southwark. Yale University Press, 2024.
