= Street names of Kennington and Lambeth =

This is a list of the etymology of street names in the London districts of Kennington and Lambeth. The areas have no formally defined boundaries – those utilised here are Westminster Bridge Road/St George's Circus/London Road to the north, Newington Butts/Kennington Park Road to the east, Kennington Road and Black Prince Road to the south and the river Thames to the west.

- Albert Embankment – built in the 1860s over former marshlands, it was named for Albert, Prince Consort, husband of Queen Victoria
- Aulton Place
- Austral Street – formerly South Street, both presumably simply descriptive
- Barkham Terrace – after Edward Barkham, 18th century benefactor of the Bethlem Royal Hospital
- Beaufoy Walk – after local businessmen and philanthropists the Beaufoys
- Bedlam Mews – after the Bethlem Royal Hospital, a notorious hospital once located here
- Bird Walk
- Bishop's Terrace
- Black Prince Road – after Edward the Black Prince, son of Edward III, who owned this land
- Bowden Street – after John Bowden, who bought this land from the Cleavers in 1815
- Brook Drive – after a former brook (stream) here that formed the boundary between local parishes
- Carlisle Street
- Castlebrook Close
- Centaur Street – after the mythical creatures, by association with nearby Hercules Street
- Chester Way – as it formed part of the manor of Kennington, which belonged to the Duchy of Cornwall (the Prince of Wales also being Earl of Chester)
- China Walk
- Churchyard Row – after the former St Mary's church located here, destroyed in the Blitz
- Cleaver Square and Cleaver Street – after Mary Cleaver, who developed this area in the 1700s
- Colnbrook Street
- Cosser Street – after Cosser & Sons, a 19th-century family timber business located near here
- Cottington Street – after Francis Cottington, 1st Baron Cottington, 17th century diplomat and politician, who leased land near here; formerly Mansion House Row
- Cricketers Court – presumably by connection with the nearby Oval Cricket Ground
- Cumberland Mews
- Dante Place and Dante Road – after the Italian poet Dante Alighieri
- Denny Crescent and Denny Street – after Rev. Edward Denny, former vicar of St Peter's Church, Vauxhall
- Distin Street
- Dugard Way
- Dumain Court
- Elephant & Castle – derived from a coaching inn of this name
- Elias Place
- Elliot's Row
- Falstaff Court
- Fitzalan Street – after Thomas Arundel (FitzAlan), Archbishop of Canterbury in the early 15th century, by connection with the nearby Lambeth Palace
- Fives Court
- Garden Row
- Gaywood Street
- George Mathers Road
- Geraldine Street – after the nearby Geraldine Mary Harmsworth Park, named for the mother of 20th century newspaper proprietor Harold Harmsworth, 1st Viscount Rothermere
- Gibson Road
- Gilbert Road
- Gladstone Street – after William Ewart Gladstone, Victorian-era Prime Minister
- Hamlet Court
- Hanover Gardens
- Harmsworth Mews
- Hayles Buildings and Street – after the Hayles family, former local landowners
- Hedger Street
- Herald's Place
- Hercules Road – after Hercules House, built by late 18th century circus owner Philip Astley after one of his favourite circus acts
- Holst Court
- Holyoak Road
- Hornbeam Close
- Hotspur Street
- Ingram Close
- Juxon Street – after William Juxon, Archbishop of Canterbury 1660–63, by connection with the nearby Lambeth Palace
- Kempsford Road
- Kenneth Court
- Kennings Way – unknown; formerly White Hart Row
- Kennington Lane, Kennington Road and Kennington Park Road – after the Old English Chenintune (‘settlement of Chenna’a people’) another explanation is that it means "place of the King", or "town of the King". (Note: Do not confuse the latter two with Kensington Road and Kensington Park Road).
- King Edward Walk – after Edward VI, who granted land near here to the City of London
- Knight's Walk
- Lambeth High Street, Lambeth Road and Lambeth Palace Road – refers to a harbour where lambs were either shipped from or to. It is formed from the Old English 'lamb' and 'hythe'. Lambeth Palace is the official London residence of the Archbishop of Canterbury
- Lamlash Street
- Lollard Street – named to commemorate the persecution of the Lollards in the 14th century; it was formerly East Street, after a branch of the local landowning Clayton family
- London Road – the road that led to London
- Longville Road
- McAuley Close
- Marylee Way
- Mead Row
- Methley Street
- Milverton Street
- Monkton Street
- Morrells Yard
- Morton Place – after John Morton, Archbishop of Canterbury 1486–1500, by connection with the nearby Lambeth Palace
- Newington Butts – Newington is now the almost obsolete name for the Elephant and Castle area; it means ‘new village/farmstead’ and dates to the early Middle Ages. The ‘Butts’ refers either archery butts, or just bits of land
- Newnham Terrace
- Newport Street
- Nightingale Mews
- Norfolk Row
- Oakden Street
- Oakey Lane – after J Oakey & Son, owner of a Victorian-era emery paper manufacturers near here
- Old Paradise Street – after a former burial ground (‘paradise’) located here
- Opal Street – unknown; formerly Pleasant Row
- Orient Street – presumably with reference to the other compass-point related streets here
- Oswin Street
- Othello Close
- Pastor Street
- Penshurst Place
- Polperro Mews – probably after the Cornish town Polperro, as the Duchy of Cornwall formerly owned much of the land here
- Portia Court
- Pratt Walk – named by its late 18th century builder Joseph Mawbey for his mother's family
- Princess Street
- Radcot Street
- Ravensdon Street – unknown; formerly Queen's Row, which had been laid out by 1799: the street was widened c 1868 when Sir Gilbert East redeveloped the estate.
- Reedworth Street
- Renfrew Road
- Rifle Court
- Royal Street – after the former Royal George pub here
- Sail Street
- St George's Circus, St George's Mews and St George's Road – as this area was formerly called St George's Fields, after St George the Martyr, Southwark church; the circus opened in 1770
- St Mary's Gardens – after the parish of St Mary's, Lambeth
- St Olave's Gardens – after the local parish of Southwark St Olave
- Saperton Walk
- Saunders Street
- Seaton Close
- Sidford Place
- Silk Mews
- Stannary Place and Stannary Street – as it formed part of the manor of Kennington, which belonged to the Duchy of Cornwall, who also owned land around the stannary towns of Cornwall and Devon; Stannary Street was formerly Kennington Place
- Stoughton Close
- Sullivan Road
- Tavy Close
- Temple West Mews
- Upper Marsh
- Virgil Street
- Walcot Square – after Edmund Walcot, 17th century owner of this land
- Walnut Tree Walk – after the walnut trees formerly prominent here
- Westminster Bridge Road – as it leads to Westminster Bridge
- West Square – after its late 18th century owners the West family
- White Hart Street – by connection with local landowner Edward the Black Prince, son of Edward III, whose crest was a white hart
- Whiteacre Mews
- Whitehorse Mews
- Whitgift Street – after John Whitgift, Archbishop of Canterbury 1583–1604, by connection with the nearby Lambeth Palace
- Wigton Place
- Wincott Street
- Windmill Row
