= Street names of Westminster =

This is a list of the etymology of street names in the London district of Westminster. The Westminster area (as distinct from the council area the City of Westminster) has no formally defined boundaries – those utilised here are the generally accepted boundaries of: The Mall and Northumberland Avenue to the north, the river Thames and Victoria Embankment/Millbank to the east, Vauxhall Bridge Road to the south and Buckingham Gate, Buckingham Palace Road and Bressenden Place to the west. For convenience Constitution Hill and Spur Road in the Royal Parks, and the area around the Wellington Arch, are included here, as are the streets in the Leicester Square area.

== Westminster ==
- Abbey Orchard Street – after a former orchard here attached to St Peter's Abbey
- Abingdon Street – after James Bertie, 1st Earl of Abingdon who owned a house on Dean's Yard in the 17th century
- Ambrosden Avenue – unknown
- Apsley Way – after the adjacent Apsley House, originally built for Henry Bathurst, 2nd Earl Bathurst (Lord Apsley), later the residence of the Dukes of Wellington
- Arneway Street – after Thomas Arneway, former benefactor to the local parish's poor
- Artillery Place and Artillery Row – after a former nearby artillery practice ground of the 19th century
- Ashley Place – thought to be after Anthony Ashley Cooper, 7th Earl of Shaftesbury, Victorian politician and philanthropist
- Atterbury Street – after Francis Atterbury, Dean of Westminster in 1713
- Barton Street – after 18th century actor Barton Booth, who also attended Westminster School
- Bennett's Yard – after Thomas Bennett, 17th century local resident
- Bessborough Gardens – after John Ponsonby, 5th Earl of Bessborough and later Baron Duncannon of Bessborough
- Birdcage Walk – after the aviaries that were formerly part of St James's Park
- Bloomburg Street – after Dr Blomberg, Domestic Chaplain to George IV
- Bressenden Place – this street was built in 1962, replacing a small line of shops called Bressenden Row; the origin of the name is unknown
- Brewer's Green – after William Brewer, 17th century gardener here
- Bridge Street – presumably as it leads to Westminster Bridge
- Broad Sanctuary, Little Sanctuary and The Sanctuary – after the former nearby St Peter's Sanctuary which offered refuge for those accused of crime
- Broadway – self-explanatory; it was formerly Broad Place
- Buckingham Gate, Buckingham Mews, Buckingham Place, Buckingham Palace Road, Palace Place and Palace Street – all named by association with Buckingham Palace, originally built for John Sheffield, Duke of Buckingham
- Bulinga Street – after Bulinga Fen, formerly here in Saxon times
- Butler Place – after Nicholas Butler, who built (now demolished) almshouses here in 1675
- Canon Row – after the canons of St Stephen's, the chapel in the former Palace of Westminster, founded in the 12th century
- Cardinal Walk – presumably by association with the adjacent Westminster Cathedral
- Carey Place – after William Carey, headmaster of Westminster School 1803–14
- Carlisle Place – after George William Frederick Howard, 7th Earl of Carlisle, Viscount Morpeth, who was chiefly responsible for local development in the 1850s
- Carteret Street – after Sir Edward de Carteret, local 17th century landowner
- Castle Lane – after a former inn of this name that stood here
- Cathedral Walk – as it leads to Westminster Cathedral
- Catherine Place – unknown
- Causton Street – after Thomas Causton, Canon at Westminster
- Caxton Street – after William Caxton, creator of the first English printing press in 1476
- Chadwick Street – after Hannah Chadwick, who left money to local schools in her will
- Chapter Street – as the land belonged to the Dean and Chapter of Westminster Abbey
- Charing Cross – after the Eleanor cross at Charing, from the Old English word "cierring", referring to a bend in the River Thames
- Coburg Place
- Cockpit Steps – after a former cock fighting ring on this site
- Constitutional Hill – obtained its name in the 17th century from King Charles II's habit of taking "constitutional" walks there. In Strype's Map, 1720, it is marked "Road to Kensington". In John Smith's map of 1724, it is called "Constitution Hill"
- Cowley Street – after 18th century actor Barton Booth, who also owned land at Cowley in Middlesex
- Craig's Court – after Joseph Craig, who built this Court in the 1600s
- Cureton Street – after William Cureton, noted Orientalist and canon of Westminster 1849–64
- Dacre Street – after Joan Dacre, 7th Baroness Dacre, who lived in a house on this site in the 15th century
- Dartmouth Street – after William Legge, 1st Earl of Dartmouth, Lord Privy Seal in the 1710s and local resident
- Dean Bradley Street – after George Granville Bradley, Dean of Westminster 1881–1902
- Dean Farrar Street – after Frederick William Farrar, rector of St Margaret's, Westminster and a canon at Westminster in the late 19th century
- Dean Ryle Street – after Sir Herbert Edward Ryle, Dean of Westminster 1911–25
- Dean Stanley Street – after Arthur Penrhyn Stanley, Dean of Westminster 1864–81
- Dean Trench Street – after Richard Chenevix Trench, Dean of Westminster 1856–64
- Dean's Yard and Little Dean's Yard – location of the Dean of Westminster's house
- Derby Gate – after William, Lord Derby, who built a mansion on this site in the early 17th century
- Douglas Street – after William Douglas, Canon at Westminster
- Downing Street – after Sir George Downing, 1st Baronet, local landowner of the 17th century
- Duke of Wellington Place – after the adjacent Apsley House, originally built for Henry Bathurst, 2nd Earl Bathurst (Lord Apsley), later the residence of the Dukes of Wellington
- Elizabeth Court
- Elverton Street – unknown
- Emery Hill Street – after Emery Hill, benefactor to local charities
- Erasmus Street – after Dutch scholar Desiderius Erasmus, who moved to London in 1498
- Esterbrooke Street – unknown
- Francis Street – after Francis Wilcox, local 19th century landowner; formerly Francis Place
- Fynes Street – after Charles John Fynes Clinton, who was educated at Westminster School
- Gayfere Street – after Thomas Gayfere, mason, who worked on Westminster Abbey in the early 19th century
- Great College Street, College Mews and Little College Street – after Westminster School, formerly known as St Peter's College, Westminster
- Great George Street and Little George Street – after either George II, reigning king when the street was built in 1750 or a former inn here called The George
- Great Peter Street – after St Peter, patron of Westminster Abbey
- Great Scotland Yard and Scotland Place – site of a house used by visiting monarchs of Scotland until the 13th century
- Great Smith Street and Little Smith Street – after John Smith, circa 1700 builder of these streets
- Greencoat Place and Greencoat Row – after the Green Coat School which formerly stood here, named for the colour of the school's uniform, demolished 1877
- Greycoat Place and Greycoat Street – after the Grey Coat School for Children which moved here in 1701
- Hatherley Street – after William Page Wood, 1st Baron Hatherley, Victorian era politician and local resident
- Herrick Street – after Robert Herrick, 17th century poet
- Hide Place – unknown
- Horseferry Road – after a ferry that carries passengers and their horses over to the Thames near here, prior to the construction of Lambeth Bridge
- Horse Guards Avenue and Horse Guards Road – after the quarters of the Horse Guards, established on Whitehall in 1663
- Howick Place – thought to be named for Howick Cross, Lancashire
- John Islip Street – after John Islip, Abbot of Westminster in Tudor times
- King Charles Street – after Charles II reigning monarch when the street was built in 1682
- King's Scholars’ Passage – after the King's Scholars of Westminster School
- Lewisham Street – after William Legge, 1st Earl of Dartmouth, Viscount Lewisham, Lord Privy Seal in the 1710s and local resident
- Lord North Street – originally just North Street, as led north from Smith Square, however this was altered in 1936 to commemorate Lord North, Prime Minister 1770–82, so as to avoid confusion with similarly name streets
- The Mall – built as a course for playing the game pall mall, fashionable in the 17th century
- Marsham Street – after Sir Robert Marsham, who inherited this land from Sir Richard Tufton in the 17th century
- Matthew Parker Street – after Matthew Parker, archbishop of Canterbury 1559–75; it was formerly Bennett Street, as Corpus Christi College, Cambridge (nicknamed Bennett College) owned land here
- Maunsel Street – after John Maunsel (or Mansell), local 13th century landowner and adviser to King Henry III
- Medway Street – after the Medway in the Diocese of Rochester, where the deans of Westminster were bishops from 1663 – 1802
- Millbank – derives its name from a watermill owned by Westminster Abbey that once stood at a site close to present day College Green.
- Monck Street – after Henry Monck, 18th century benefactor to the local parish
- Montaigne Close
- Morpeth Terrace – after George William Frederick Howard, 7th Earl of Carlisle, Viscount Morpeth, who was chiefly responsible for local development in the 1850s
- Northumberland Avenue and Northumberland Street – site of the former Northumberland House, built originally in the early 17th century for the earls of Northampton and later acquired by the earls of Northumberland
- Old Palace Yard – after the former Old Palace of Westminster, where the Houses of Parliament now stand
- Old Pye Street – after Robert Pye, local MP in the mid-17th century
- Old Queen Street – as it approaches Queen Anne's Gate, or possibly after Elizabeth I; it was formerly just Queen Street
- Osbert Street – after Osbert of Clare, Suffolk, prior of the abbey of St Peter's, Westminster in the 1130s
- Page Street – after William Page, head of Westminster School 1814–19
- Palmer Street – after the Reverend James Palmer, who founded (now demolished) almshouses near here in 1656
- Parliament Square and Parliament Street – after the Houses of Parliament
- Perkin's Rents – after a local landlord by the name of Perkin, recorded in the late 17th century
- Petty France – after a small French settlement that existed here in the 16th century
- Pine Apple Court – after a former inn here of this name
- Ponsonby Place and Ponsonby Terrace – after John Ponsonby, 5th Earl of Bessborough and later Baron Duncannon of Bessborough
- Queen Anne's Gate – as it leads to the gate of the same name, named for Queen Anne, entering into St James's Park
- Rampayne Street – after Charles Rampayne, benefactor to local poor schools and hospitals, Mr Rampayne
- Regency Place and Regency Street – as it was opened by George, Prince Regent (later King George IV) in 1811
- Richmond Terrace – after a house owned by the dukes of Richmond which formerly stood on this site in the 17th and 18th centuries
- Rochester Row and Rochester Street – after the Diocese of Rochester, where the deans of Westminster were bishops from 1663 – 1802
- Romney Street – after Robert, Baron Romney, son of local landowner Sir Robert Marsham
- Rutherford Street – after Reverend William Rutherford, Headmaster of Westminster School 1883–1901
- St Ann's Lane and St Ann's Street – after a former chapel dedicated to St Anne that formerly stood here
- St Ermin's Hill – thought to be a corruption of Hermit Hill, or possibly after St Ermin/Armel, 6th century monk
- St James’ Court –
- St Margaret Street – after the nearby St Margaret's, Westminster
- St Matthew Street – after St Matthew's Church, Westminster; it was formerly Duck Lane, as ducks were reared here
- St Oswulf Street – as this area was formerly part of the Ossulstone hundred of Middlesex; Oswulf was Saxon-era chief here
- Seaforth Place – after Seaforth in Scotland, by association with the London Scottish (regiment) formerly bases nearby
- Smith Square – after the local 18th century landowner Sir James Smith
- Spenser Street – after the poet Edmund Spenser, who lived nearby
- Spring Gardens – after the 17th century pleasure grounds of this name which formerly lay on this site; they were closed in 1660
- Spur Road
- Stafford Place – after Viscount Stafford, who lived in a house adjacent in the 17th century
- Stanford Street – unknown
- Stillington Street – after Robert Stillington, Bishop of Bath in the 15th century
- Storey's Gate – after 17th century St James's Park birdkeeper Edward Storey, who had a house near here
- Strutton Ground – corruption of ‘Stourton’, from Stourton House where the local Dacre family lived
- Thirleby Road – after Thomas Thirlby, Bishop of Westminster 1540–50
- Thorney Street – after Thorney Island, a former eyot in the Thames
- Tothill Street – uncertain; the street formerly led to Tothill Fields, thought to be from 'tote hill' meaning a look-out hill
- Tufton Street – after its 17th century builder Sir Richard Tufton
- Udall Street – after Nicholas Udall, 16th century playwright and headmaster of Westminster School
- Vandon Passage and Vandon Street – after Cornelius Vandon, 16th century yeoman of the guard who founded almshouses for the poor on adjacent Petty France
- Vane Street – after Sir Henry Vane the Younger, prominent ally of Cromwell in the Civil War period; Vane was a pupil at the nearby Westminster School
- Vauxhall Bridge Road – as it approaches Vauxhall Bridge
- Victoria Embankment – after Queen Victoria, reigning queen at the time of the building of the Thames Embankment
- Victoria Street – after Queen Victoria, reigning monarch when the street was built in 1850–51
- Vincent Square and Vincent Street – after William Vincent, Dean of Westminster 1803–15 and headmaster of Westminster School; the square was originally a recreation ground for the school
- Walcott Street – after Reverend MEC Walcott, curate of the St Margaret's, Westminster in the 1840s
- Warwick Row – after Henry Wise, local 18th century landowner and gardener to William III, who owned land in Warwickshire
- Whitehall, Whitehall Court, Whitehall Gardens and Whitehall Place – after the former Palace of Whitehall on this site, destroyed by fire in 1698
- Wilcox Place – after Francis Wilcox, local 19th century landowner
- Wilfred Street – originally William Street, after Viscount Stafford, who lived in a house adjacent in the 17th century
- Willow Place – after the willow trees that were formerly common here
- Windsor Place – after the Windsor Castle pub formerly located here

== Leicester Square area ==
The streets around Leicester Square do not neatly fall into one of the surrounding areas and are thus dealt with here for convenience. The boundaries utilised here are: Coventry Street, the northern side of Leicester Square and Cranbourn Street to the north, Charing Cross Road and St Martin's Place to the east, Trafalgar Square, Charing Cross and Cockspur Street to the south and Haymarket to the west.

- Bear Street – unknown, though possibly from a former pub on this street called The Bear, or possibly after Augustine Beare, a glazier who worked near here or perhaps the heraldic device of the Earls of Leicester
- Charing Cross and Charing Cross Road – built 1887, and named as it led to the cross at Charing, from the Old English word "cierring", referring to a bend in the River Thames
- Cockspur Street – unknown, though possibly after the cock fighting that formerly occurred here, cocks often having spurs attached to their feet during fights
- Coventry Street – after Henry Coventry, Secretary of State to Charles II, who lived near here in Shaver's Hall
- Cranbourn Alley and Cranbourn Street – built in the 1670s and named after local landowner the Earl of Salisbury, Viscount Cranbourn (or Cranbourne) after the town in Dorset
- Excel Court – after Excel House, 1930s office block located here
- Haymarket – site of a former market selling hay until the 1830s
- Hobhouse Court – after Sir John Cam Hobhouse, Victorian MP and arts patron
- Hunt's Court – after Samuel Hunt, local carpenter and leaseholder in the 17th century
- Irving Street – after Henry Irving, popular Victorian actor; the street was originally named Green Street, as it led to a bowling green near Leicester Square
- Leicester Square – the square was home to Leicester House in the 17th and 18th centuries, the town house of Robert Sidney, 2nd Earl of Leicester and of successive Princes of Wales; Leicester Court was formerly Ryder Court, after local leaseholder Richard Ryder – it was renamed in 1936
- Long's Court
- Orange Street – after the William III, Prince of Orange, reigning king when thus street was built. The western section between Haymarket and St Martin's Street was formerly called James Street, after James II
- Oxendon Street – after Sir Henry Oxendon, husband of Mary Baker, daughter of Robert Baker who built the former Piccadilly House nearby
- Pall Mall East – laid out as a grounds for playing pall mall in the 17th century
- Panton Street – after Colonel Thomas Panton, local property dealer of the 17th century
- St Martin's Place and St Martin's Street – both named after St Martin-in-the-Fields church
- Shaver's Place – after Simon Osbaldeston, who built a gaming house here in the early 17th century. As Osbaldeston was formerly barber to Lord Chamberlain, local wits coined this name in jest at the ‘shaving’ going on at the games house
- Suffolk Place and Suffolk Street – after Thomas Howard, Earl of Suffolk, who owned a stable yard attached to Northumberland House which lay on this site
- Swiss Court – after the Swiss Centre that formerly stood here
- Trafalgar Square – in commemoration of Horatio Nelson’s 1805 victory at the Battle of Trafalgar
- Whitcomb Court and Whitcomb Street – after William Whitcomb, 17th century brewer and property developer
