= Street names of Sheffield =

English urban street name directory

This is a list of the etymology of street names in Sheffield, South Yorkshire, England.

- Arundel Gate and Arundel Street – named after the Earl of Arundel (one of the Dukes of Norfolk - the Norfolks were major landowners in the area)
- Cavendish Street – named after the Cavendish family
- Church Street – after Sheffield Cathedral, which was the main parish church until 1914
- Devonshire Green and Division Street – named after the Duke of Devonshire
- Fitzalan Square – the Fitzalans were a branch of the Duke of Norfolk family
- Howard Street – named after one of the Dukes of Norfolk
- Leopold Square and Leopold Street – named after Prince Leopold, Duke of Albany
- Norfolk Street and Howard Street – named after the Dukes of Norfolk
- Sheaf Square and Sheaf Street – after the River Sheaf
- Wellington Street – named after Arthur Wellesley, 1st Duke of Wellington
