= Lines of Communication (London) =

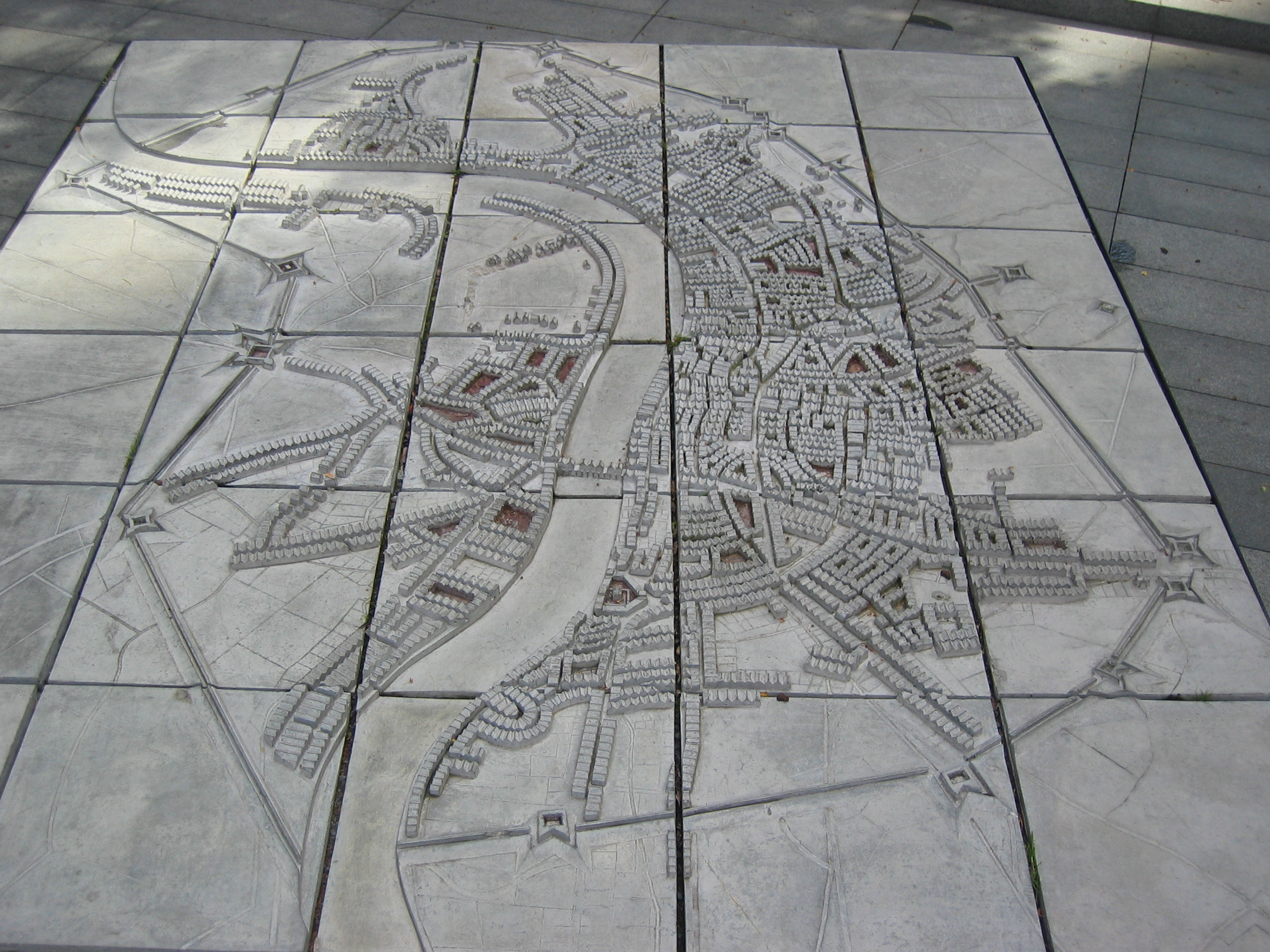
A model of the fortifications built around London during the English Civil War viewed from the east.

The Lines of Communication were English Civil War fortifications commissioned by Parliament (see the Order for intrenching and fortifying the City of London, 7 March 1643) and built around London between 1642 and 1643 to protect the capital from attack by the Royalist armies of Charles I. They acted to supplement the inner defences provided by Roman and medieval wall in the City of London which underwent repairs and maintenance at this time.

In 1642 some basic fortifications were built, in the form of street barricades and small earthworks. In 1643 a major construction effort was made, to provide a comprehensive ring of fortifications around the city. Much of the work was done by volunteer labour, organized by the trained bands and the livery companies. Up to 20,000 people are thought to be involved, and the works were completed in under two months. The fortifications failed their only test when the New Model Army entered London in 1647, and they were levelled by Parliament the same year.

== The Works ==
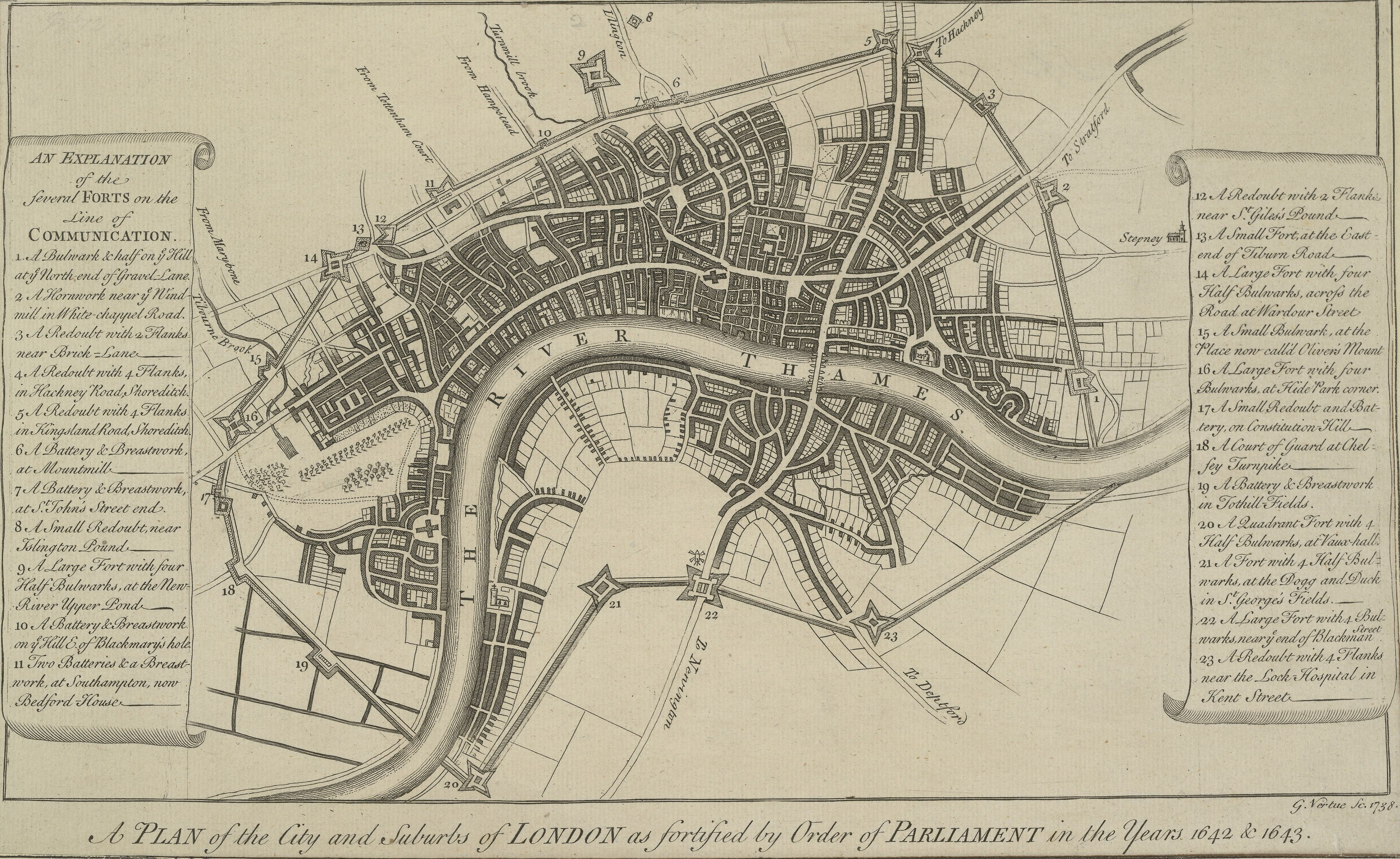
George Vertue's 1738 plan of the London Lines of Communication

These works principally consisted of a strong earthen rampart reinforced with a series of 23 fortifications of various types surrounding the whole City, and its liberties (including Southwark), at a distance of one and a half to two miles from the city centre. From George Vertue's print it may be seen that the line begun below the Tower of London, at the Thames, and went northward towards the windmill in Whitechapel Road; then inclining to the north-west, it crossed the Hackney and Kingsland Roads, near Shoreditch, and turning to the south-west, crossed the end of St. John Street, Gray's Inn Lane, Bloomsbury, and Oxford Road (now New Oxford Street), near St. Giles Pound (junction with St Giles High Street). Then proceeding westward to Hyde Park Corner, and Constitution Hill, it inclined towards Chelsea Turnpike, Tothill Fields, and the Thames. Again commencing near Vauxhall, it ran north-eastward to St. George's Fields, then making an angle to the east, crossed the Borough Road at the end of Blackman Street (southern section of Borough High Street), proceeded to the end of Kent Street (now Tabard Street) on the Deptford Road (now Old Kent Road), then inclining to the north-east, joined the Thames nearly opposite to the point where it began.

The major fortifications were anti-clockwise from the north-east bank of the Thames:

East

- 1) Bulwark, & half.bulwark : Gravel Lane
- 2) Hornwork : Whitechapel Road
- 3) Redoubt & 2 flanks : Brick Lane
- 4) Redoubt & 4 flanks : Hackney Road
- 5) Redoubt & 4 flanks : Kingsland Road

North

- 6) battery & Breastwork : Mountmill
- 7 Battery & Breastwork : St John Street
- 8) Small Redoubt : Islington Road (Outlier)
- 9) Large Fort & 4 half Bulwarks : Upper Pond, New River (Outlier)
- 10) Battery & Breastwork : Hill near Black Mary's Hole

West

- 11) 2 Battery & Breastwork : Bedford House
- 12) Redoubt & 2 flanks : St Giles Road
- 13) Small Fort : Tiburn Road
- 14) Large Fort & 4 half Bulwarks : Wardour Street
- 15) Small Bulwark : Olivers Mount
- 16) Large fort & 4 Bulwarks : Hyde Park Corner
- 17) Small Bulwark & Battery : Constitution Hill
- 18) Court of Guards : Chelsea Turnpike
- 19) Battery & Breastwork : Tothill Field

South of the Thames

- 20) Quadrant Fort & 4 half Bulwarks : Vauxhall
- 21) Fort & 4 half Bulwarks : St George Field
- 22) Large Fort & 4 Bulwarks : Blackman Street
- 23) Redoubt & 4 flanks : Kent Street
