= John Thorley (MP) =

English politician

John Thorley (fl. 1397) of Lincoln was an English politician.

He was a member (MP) of the parliament of England for Lincoln in September 1397.
