= The Queen's Walk (South Bank) =

Promenade on the River Thames in London

Coordinates: 51°29′40″N 0°07′23″W

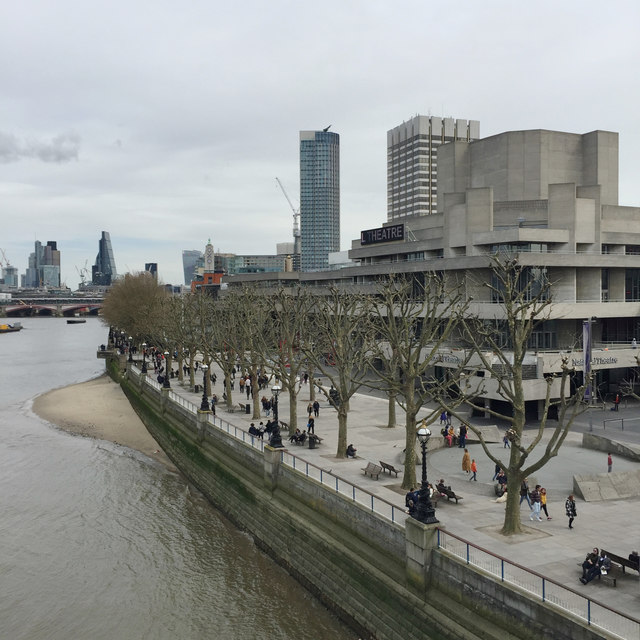
A stretch of the Queen's Walk, passing the National Theatre

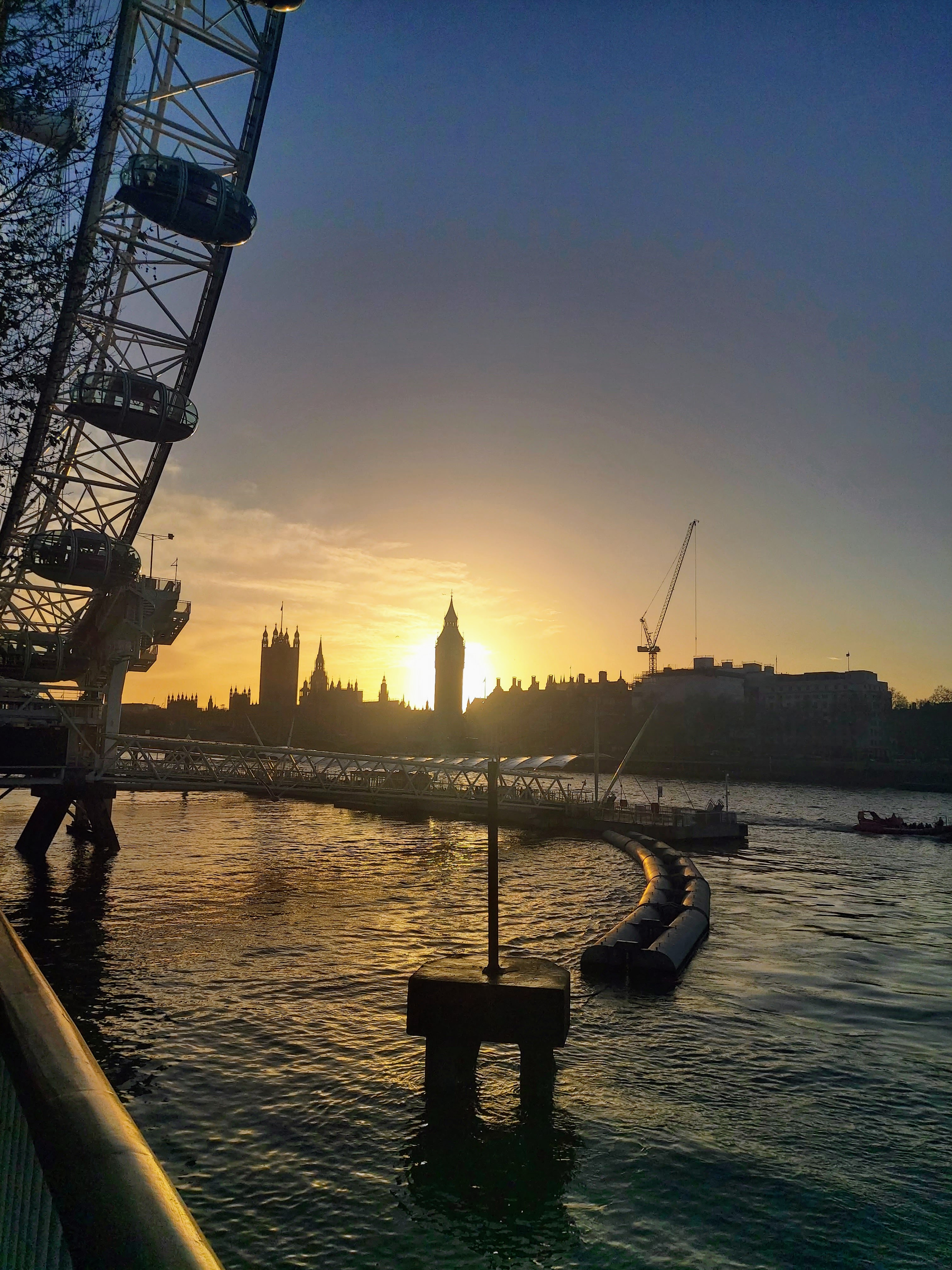
The Palace of Westminster from the Queen's Walk

The Queen's Walk is a promenade located on the southern bank of the River Thames in London, England, between Lambeth Bridge and Tower Bridge.

The creation of pedestrian access along the south bank of the Thames was seen as an integral part of the creation of the Jubilee Walkway to mark the Silver Jubilee of Queen Elizabeth II in 1977. However, the last section was not established until the completion of construction of London Bridge City c.1990.

In 1996, the Walk was recognised as a foundation for establishing the Thames Path national trail through London.

This is a convenient route of several miles for tourists to walk from the London Eye Ferris wheel past numerous attractions to Tower Bridge and the Tower of London.
