= John Thorley (classicist) =

British classicist and educator (1940–2026)

Professor John Thorley
- Born: 27 May 1940; South Yorkshire, England
- Died: 12 January 2026 (aged 85); Milnthorpe, England

Academic background
- Education: King's College, Durham (BA); University of Nottingham (PGCE); University of Durham (MA); University of Hull (PhD)

Academic work
- Discipline: Classics
- Sub-discipline: Ancient Rome; Ancient Greece; Classical archaeology
- Institutions: Trinity School, Carlisle; Charlotte Mason College, Ambleside; University of Lancaster

John Thorley (1940 – 2026) was a British classicist, philologist and educator who was Headmaster of Trinity School, Carlisle from 1978 to 1983 and Principal of Charlotte Mason College, Ambleside from 1983 to 1994.

== Early life and education ==
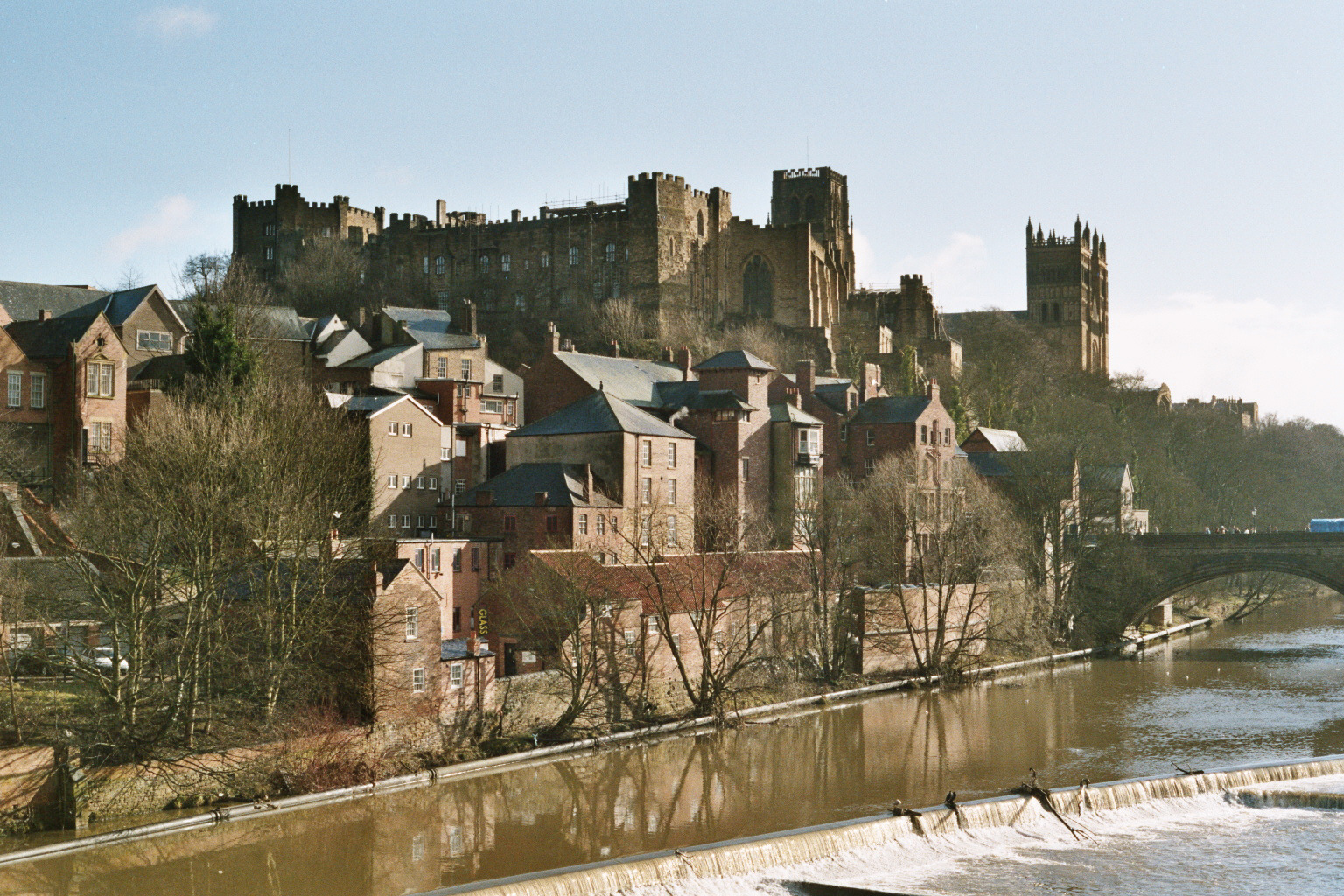
Durham

Thorley was born in South Yorkshire on 27 May 1940 . He read classics at King's College, Durham and gained a Postgraduate Certificate in Education at the University of Nottingham. He then received a Master of Arts in classics from the University of Durham, followed by a Doctor of Philosophy in classics from the University of Hull.

== Career ==
Charlotte Mason College, Ambleside

Thorley began his career teaching classics in the 1960s. He served as headmaster at Trinity School, Carlisle from 1978 to 1983, after which he was principal of Charlotte Mason College, Ambleside until 1994. While Thorley was at Charlotte Mason College, the college increased its subject provision. Starting in 1992, it became affiliated with Lancaster University, at which point Thorley became the Dean of Education Faculty until 1994. Two years later, the college became affiliated with St Martin's College, Lancaster.

During his tenure with Charlotte Mason College, Thorley also rescued and catalogued the Charlotte Mason archives ensuring their preservation in the Armitt Library and Museum, Ambleside.

Later, Thorley taught Greek history at St. Martin's College, as well as Latin and Greek at Lancaster University, retiring in 2023.

== Personal life ==
Thorley was married to Joan Thorley and has two sons.

He died in his Milnthorpe home on 2 January 2026.

== Books ==
- Thorley, J. (1996), Athenian Democracy, Lancaster Pamphlets, London: Routledge, ISBN 978-0415129671
- Thorley, J. (1998), Documents in Medieval Latin, London: Duckworth and Co., ISBN 0-7156-2817-8
- Smith, J. Carroll; Thorley, J. (2023), Relational Leadership in Education: Critical Insights From the Correspondence of Charlotte Mason and Henrietta Franklin, Charlotte Mason Centenary Series, Independent, ISBN 979-8854706810
- Smith, J. Carroll; Thorley, J. (2025), A Liberal Education for All: From the letters of Charlotte Mason, Jilliby, Australia: Living Book Press, ISBN 978-1761535895
