= Church Street Historic District =

Church Street Historic District may refer to:

- Old Main and Church Street Historic District, Auburn, Alabama, listed on the National Register of Historic Places (NRHP) in Lee County, Alabama
- Church Street East Historic District (Mobile, Alabama), listed on the NRHP in Alabama
- Church Street Historic District (Wilmington, Delaware)
- Church Street Historic District (Dade City, Florida), listed on the NRHP
- Walton Street-Church Street Historic District, Baconton, Georgia, listed on the NRHP
- Church Street-Cherokee Street Historic District, Marietta, Georgia, listed on the NRHP in Georgia
- East Church Street Historic District, Monroe, Georgia, listed on the NRHP in Georgia
- Athens-Candler-Church Street Historic District, Winder, Georgia, listed on the NRHP in Georgia
- Church Street Historic District (Belfast, Maine), listed on the NRHP
- Church Street Historic District (North Adams, Massachusetts), listed on the NRHP
- Church Street-Caddy Hill Historic District, North Adams, Massachusetts, listed on the NRHP
- Church Street Historic District (Ware, Massachusetts), listed on the NRHP
- Church Street Historic District (Wilmington, Massachusetts), listed on the NRHP
- Broad Street-Church Street Historic District, Columbia, Mississippi, listed on the NRHP in Mississippi
- South Church Street Historic District (Tupelo, Mississippi), listed on the NRHP in Mississippi
- Church Street Commercial District (Ferguson, Missouri), listed on the NRHP in Missouri
- Church Street-Congress Street Historic District, Moravia, New York, listed on the NRHP
- Church Street Historic District (Nassau, New York), listed on the NRHP
- Church Street Row, Poughkeepsie, New York, listed on the NRHP
- Church Street Historic District (Richfield Springs, New York), listed on the NRHP
- Church Street Historic District (Saranac Lake, New York), listed on the NRHP
- Church Street Historic District (Batesburg-Leesville, South Carolina), listed on the NRHP
- East Richland Street-East Church Street Historic District, Kershaw, South Carolina, listed on the NRHP
- Church Street Historic District (Leesville, South Carolina), listed on the NRHP in South Carolina
- South Street-South Church Street Historic District, Union, South Carolina, listed on the NRHP
- Church Street Historic District (Paris, Texas), listed on the NRHP in Texas
- Church Street Historic District (Burlington, Vermont), listed on the NRHP
- Head of Church Street Historic District, Burlington, Vermont, listed on the NRHP
- East Church Street-Starling Avenue Historic District, Martinsville, Virginia, listed on the NRHP
- South Church Street Historic District (Lewisburg, West Virginia), listed on the NRHP
- Church Street Historic District (Wauwatosa, Wisconsin), listed on the NRHP

== See also ==
- Church Street (disambiguation)
