= Church =

Church may refer to:

== Religion ==
- Church (building), a place/building for Christian religious activities and praying
- Church (congregation), a local congregation of a Christian denomination
- Church body, a Christian organization made of many dioceses and local parishes
- Church service, a formalized period of Christian communal worship
- Christian denomination, a Christian organization with distinct doctrine and practice
- Christian Church, either the collective body of all Christian believers, or early Christianity

== Places ==
=== United Kingdom ===
- Church, a former electoral ward of Kensington and Chelsea London Borough Council that existed from 1964 to 2002
- Church (Hyndburn ward), a Hyndburn Borough Council ward
- Church (Liverpool ward), a Liverpool City Council ward
- Church (Reading ward), a Reading Borough Council ward
- Church (Sefton ward), a Metropolitan Borough of Sefton ward
- Church, Lancashire, England

=== United States ===
- Church, Iowa, an unincorporated community
- Church Lake, a lake in Minnesota
- Church, Michigan, ghost town

== Arts, entertainment, and media ==
=== Fictional entities ===
- Church (Red vs. Blue), a fictional character in the video web series Red vs. Blue
- Church, a cat in Stephen King's novel Pet Sematary
- Church, a meeting of SOA members in the FX television series Sons of Anarchy

=== Films ===
- The Church (1989 film), an Italian horror film directed by Michele Soavi
- The Church (2018 film), an American horror film directed by Dom Franklin

=== Music ===
==== Groups ====
- Chvrches, an electropop trio from Glasgow, Scotland
- The Church (band), an Australian psychedelic rock band formed in Sydney in 1980

==== Albums ====
- Church (Billy Woods album), 2022
- Church (Galantis album), 2020
- The Church (The Church album), originally released as Of Skins and Heart, 1981
- The Church (Mr. Oizo album) or the title song, 2014
- Churches (album), by LP, or the title song, 2021

==== Songs ====
- "Church" (Alison Wonderland song), 2018
- "Church" (Jade Thirlwall song), 2025
- "Church" (T-Pain song), 2007
- "Church", by Aly & AJ from Sanctuary, 2019
- "Church", by BJ the Chicago Kid from In My Mind, 2016
- "Church", by Coldplay from Everyday Life, 2019
- "Church", by Fall Out Boy from Mania, 2018
- "Church", by Galactic from Coolin' Off, 1996
- "Church", by Jelly Roll from Whitsitt Chapel, 2023
- "Church", by Macklemore from Gemini, 2017
- "Church", by OutKast from Speakerboxxx/The Love Below, 2003
- "Church", by Owen Riegling from Bruce County (From the Beginning), 2024
- "Church", by Tina Arena, 2021
- "The Church", by Hawkwind from Church of Hawkwind, 1982

=== Recording studios ===
- The Church Studios, in Crouch End, North London, England
- The Church Studio, in Tulsa, Oklahoma, US

=== Other media ===
- The Church (play), a 1933 play by Louis-Ferdinand Céline
- Church, a pastoral theology magazine published by the National Pastoral Life Center

== Other uses ==
- Church (programming language), a LISP-like probabilistic programming language
- Church (surname), including a list of people
- Church Line, San Francisco, California

== See also ==
- Church station (disambiguation)
- Church's (disambiguation)
- Churching (disambiguation)
- Synagogue
- Mosque
- Temple
