= National Register of Historic Places listings in Pasco County, Florida =

Location of Pasco County in Florida

This is a list of the National Register of Historic Places listings in Pasco County, Florida.

This is intended to be a complete list of the properties and districts on the National Register of Historic Places in Pasco County, Florida, United States. The locations of National Register properties and districts for which the latitude and longitude coordinates are included below, may be seen in a map.

There are 11 properties and districts listed on the National Register in the county.

This National Park Service list is complete through NPS recent listings posted March 21, 2025.

Contents: Counties in Florida (non-linked contain no National Register listings)
Alachua - Baker - Bay - Bradford - Brevard - Broward - Calhoun - Charlotte - Citrus - Clay - Collier - Columbia - DeSoto - Dixie - Duval - Escambia - Flagler - Franklin - Gadsden - Gilchrist - Glades - Gulf - Hamilton - Hardee - Hendry - Hernando - Highlands - Hillsborough (Tampa) - Holmes - Indian River - Jackson - Jefferson - Lafayette - Lake - Lee - Leon - Levy - Liberty - Madison - Manatee - Marion - Martin - Miami-Dade (Miami) - Monroe - Nassau - Okaloosa - Okeechobee - Orange - Osceola - Palm Beach - Pasco - Pinellas - Polk - Putnam - St. Johns - St. Lucie - Santa Rosa - Sarasota - Seminole - Sumter - Suwannee - Taylor - Union - Volusia - Wakulla - Walton - Washington

== Current listings ==
	Name on the Register	Image	Date listed	Location	City or town	Description
1	Charles B. Anderson House	Charles B. Anderson House	April 26, 1996 (#96000467)	5744 Moog Road; 28°12′31″N 82°43′09″W	Holiday	
2	Samuel Baker House	Samuel Baker House	February 14, 1997 (#97000052)	5744 Moog Road; 28°12′31″N 82°43′11″W	Elfers	
3	Church Street Historic District	Church Street Historic District	August 21, 1997 (#97000910)	Along Church Street between 9th and 17th Streets; 28°21′47″N 82°11′42″W	Dade City	
4	Dade City Atlantic Coast Line Railroad Depot	Dade City Atlantic Coast Line Railroad Depot	July 15, 1994 (#94000706)	Eastern side of Lakeland Road at its junction with East Meridian Avenue; 28°21′51″N 82°11′04″W	Dade City	
5	Dade City Woman's Club	Dade City Woman's Club	October 13, 2003 (#03001014)	37922 Palm Avenue; 28°21′29″N 82°11′23″W	Dade City	Part of the Clubhouses of Florida's Woman's Clubs MPS
6	Hacienda Hotel	Hacienda Hotel	October 24, 1996 (#96001185)	5621 Main Street; 28°15′01″N 82°42′48″W	New Port Richey	
7	Capt. Harold B. Jeffries House	Capt. Harold B. Jeffries House	November 29, 1995 (#95001370)	38537 5th Avenue; 28°14′04″N 82°10′47″W	Zephyrhills	
8	Oelsner Mound Archaeological Site		September 16, 2020 (#100005561)	Address Restricted	Port Richey vicinity	
9	Pasco County Courthouse	Pasco County Courthouse	September 20, 2006 (#06000843)	37918 Meridian Avenue; 28°21′50″N 82°11′20″W	Dade City	
10	St. Leo Abbey Historic District	St. Leo Abbey Historic District	January 7, 1998 (#97001637)	33701 State Road 52; 28°20′14″N 82°15′36″W	St. Leo	
11	Zephyrhills Downtown Historic District	Zephyrhills Downtown Historic District	September 27, 2001 (#01001058)	Roughly bounded by South Avenue, 9th Avenue, 7th Street, and 11th Street; 28°14′04″N 82°10′46″W	Zephyrhills	

== See also ==
- List of National Historic Landmarks in Florida
- National Register of Historic Places listings in Florida
