= South Church =

South Church may refer to:

- South Church, Andover, Massachusetts
- South Church, County Durham, a town in County Durham, England
- South Church Manse, a church in Bergenfield, New Jersey
- South Church, another name for South Presbyterian Church in New York City
- Zuiderkerk, a church in Amsterdam
- Old South Church, a church in Boston

== See also ==
- Southchurch, a town in Essex, England
- South Church railway station
- South Church Street Historic District (disambiguation)
