= Church Street =

Church Street may refer to:

== Places ==
=== Streets ===
- Church Street and Trinity Place, New York City, United States
- Church Street, Marylebone, London, United Kingdom
- Church Street (Nashville, Tennessee), United States
- Church Street (Sheffield), England, United Kingdom
- Church Street (Toronto), Ontario, Canada
- Church Street (Warrington), England
- Church Street (York), England
- Church Street, Bangalore, India
- Church Street, Liverpool, England, United Kingdom
- Church Street, Monmouth, Wales, United Kingdom
- Church Street, Oldbury, England, United Kingdom
- Church Street, Poulton-le-Fylde, England, United KIngdom
- Church Street, Wollongong, New South Wales, Australia
- Church Street, Dublin, Ireland

=== Other places ===
- Church Street (Westminster ward), an electoral ward in the City of Westminster, London, England, United Kingdom
- Church Street (Enfield ward), an electoral ward in the London Borough of Enfield that existed from 1965 to 1978
- Church Street Graveyard, an historic city cemetery located in Mobile, Alabama, United States
- Church Street tram stop, Croydon, England, United Kingdom
- Church Street-Caddy Hill Historic District, in North Adams, Massachusetts, United States
- Church Street station (MBTA), MBTA Commuter Rail station located in northern New Bedford, Massachusetts, United States
- Church Street Park, a cricket ground in Morrisville, North Carolina, United States
- Church Street, small settlement north of the village of Higham, Kent, England
- Church Street, Pretoria bombing, a car bomb attack on 20 May 1983 in the South African capital Pretoria

== Businesses ==
- Church Street Health Management, operator of Small Smiles Dental Centers
- Church Street Marketplace, Burlington, Vermont, United States

== See also ==
- Kirkgate, Leith, a street in Scotland
- Rue de l'Église, in French
- Church Street Historic District (disambiguation)
- Church Street station (disambiguation)
