= Church Road =

Church Road may refer to:

== In the United Kingdom ==
- Church Road (football stadium), a football stadium Hayes, England
- Church Road Ground, a cricket ground in Lytham, Lancashire
- Church Road Cricket Ground, a cricket ground in Earley, Berkshire
- Church Road railway station (disambiguation), various stations in England or Wales
- Church Road, Barnes, in the London suburb of Barnes
- Church End, Brent, a locality in London, or the main thoroughfare of the neighbourhood

== In the United States ==
- Church Road, Virginia, an unincorporated community
