= Jeffries House =

Jeffries House may refer to:

- Jefferies house, Melbourne, a heritage-listed house in Melbourne, Victoria, Australia
- Jeffries House (North Little Rock, Arkansas), listed on the National Register of Historic Places in Pulaski County, Arkansas
- Capt. Harold B. Jeffries House, Zephyrhills, Florida, listed on the National Register of Historic Places
- Augustine Hansell House, also known as Jeffries House, a historic house in Thomasville, Georgia
