= Church station =

Church station may refer to:

- Church station (Buffalo Metro Rail), in Buffalo, New York, United States
- Church station (Muni Metro), in San Francisco, California, United States
- Church station (SEPTA), in Philadelphia, Pennsylvania, United States

== See also ==
- Church (disambiguation)
- Church Street station (disambiguation)
- Church Road railway station (disambiguation)
