= Church's (disambiguation) =

Church's is a high-end English footwear manufacturer.

Church's may also refer to:

- Church's Texas Chicken, a fast food restaurant chain, also known as Church's Chicken in some countries.

== See also ==
- Church's theorem, a 1936 solution to the Entscheidungsproblem by Alonso Church
- Church's thesis, a hypothesis in computability theory about functions whose values are algorithmically computable
- Church's thesis (constructive mathematics), an axiom in constructive mathematics which states that all total functions are computable
- Church (disambiguation)
