= South Church Street Historic District =

South Church Street Historic District may refer to:

- South Church Street Historic District (Tupelo, Mississippi), listed on the National Register of Historic Places (NRHP) in Lee County
- South Church Street Historic District (Lewisburg, West Virginia), NRHP-listed
