= Church Street Historic District (Wilmington, Massachusetts) =

Historic district in Massachusetts, United States

- U.S. National Register of Historic Places
- U.S. Historic district
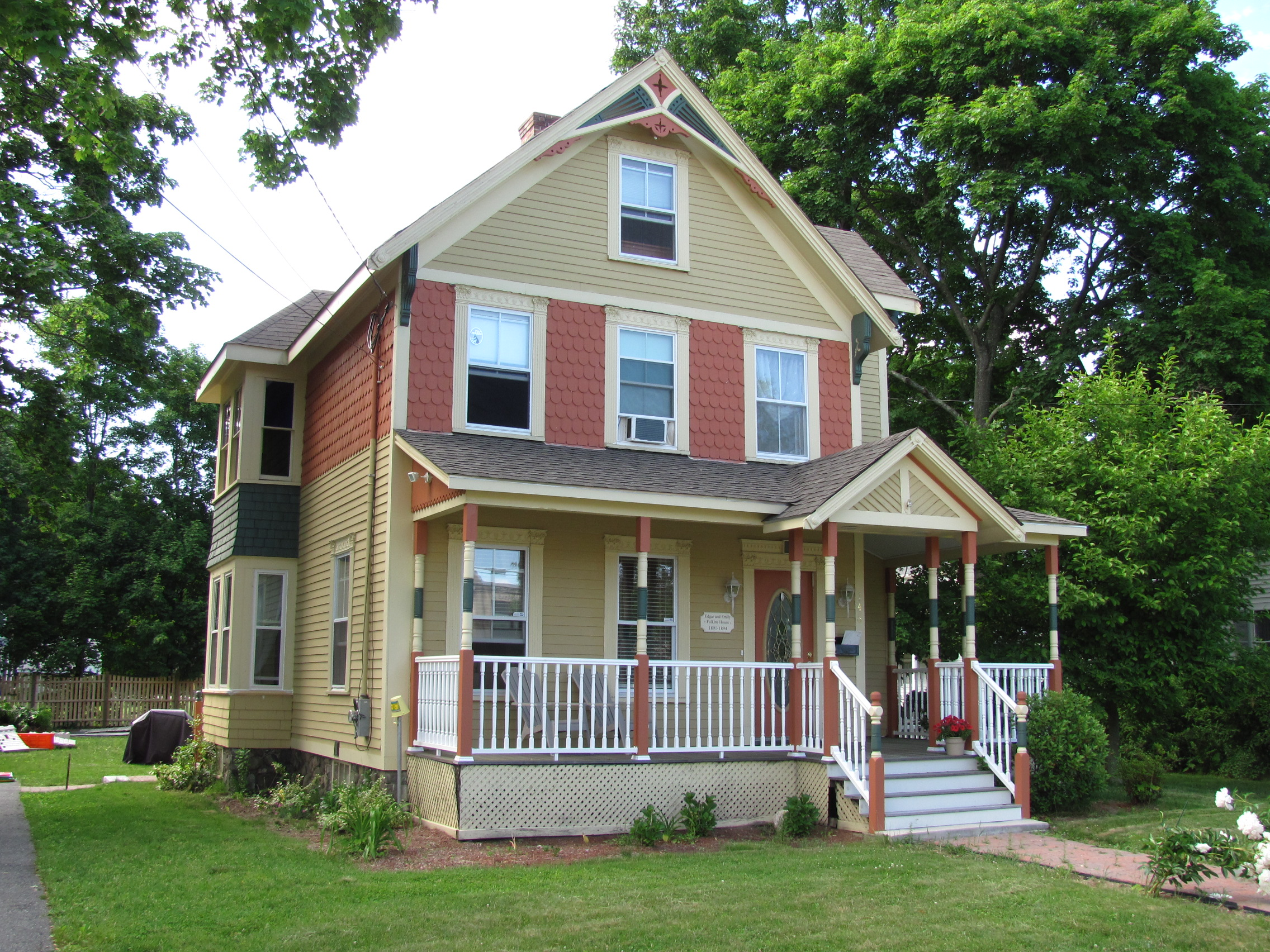
- Edgar and Emily Folkins House

- Location within Massachusetts Location within the United States
- Location: Wilmington, Massachusetts
- Coordinates: 42°33′9″N 71°10′7″W
- Area: 16 acres (6.5 ha)
- Built: 1856
- Architect: Horton, Howard M. builder; Freeman, Charles I. builder
- Architectural style: Italian Villa, Queen Anne
- NRHP reference No.: 03001175
- Added to NRHP: November 21, 2003

The Church Street Historic District in Wilmington, Massachusetts encompasses the largest cluster of high-style 19th- and early 20th-century homes in the town. The district stretches along Church Street (Massachusetts Route 62) from Hanover Street and Clark Street northeast to the town common, which is part of the Wilmington Centre Village Historic District, and includes one non-contributing house on Central Street. Most of the houses in the district are Queen Anne Victorians built in the 1880s and 1890s; the oldest building is the Maynard Spaulding House at 84 Church Street, an early 1850s house with transitional Greek Revival styling. There are three Italianate houses (72, 74, and 108 Church Street), and a smattering of 20th century styles, including Colonial Revival and Craftsman houses.

The district was listed on the National Register of Historic Places in 2003.

== See also ==
- National Register of Historic Places listings in Middlesex County, Massachusetts
