= Rue de l'Église =

French-language street name

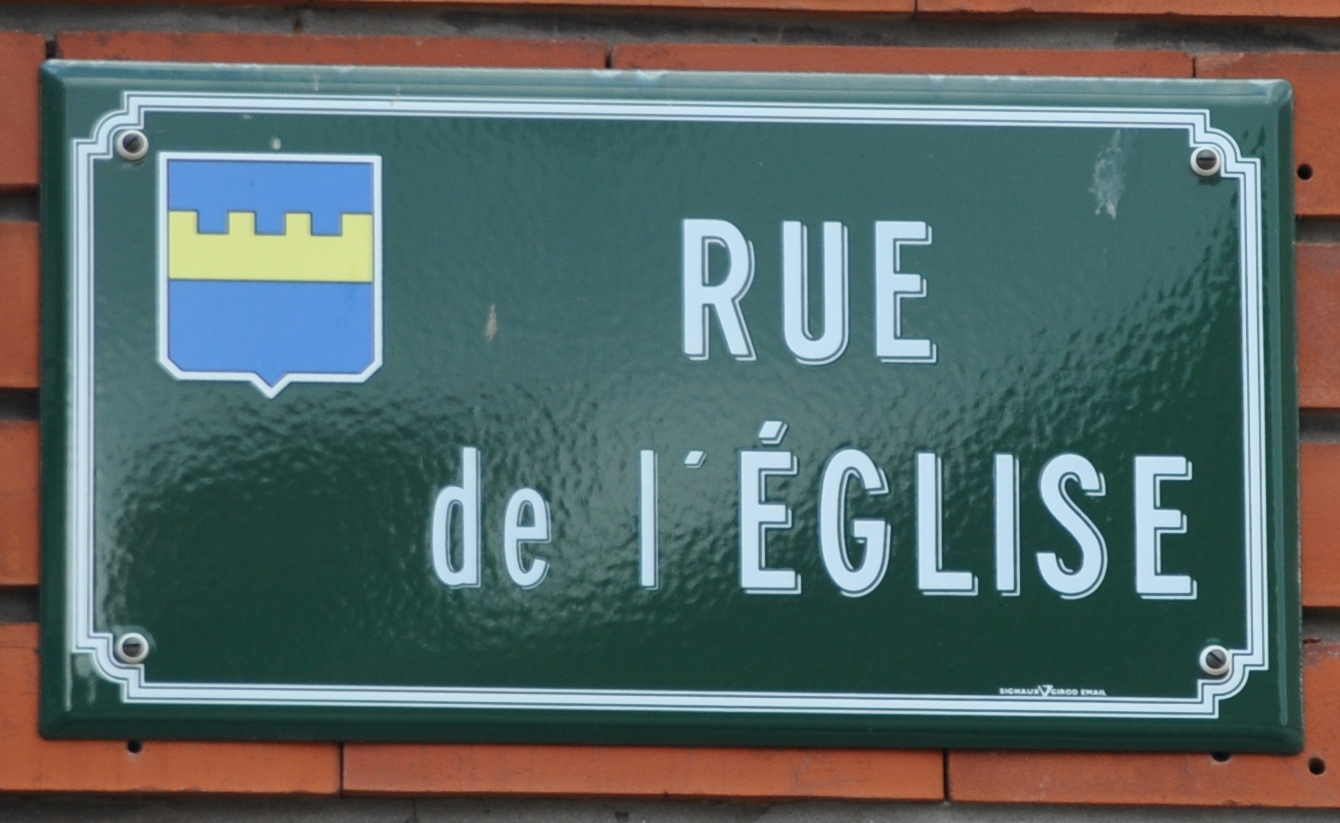
Sign of the rue de l'Église in Allouagne.

Rue de l'Église is a common road name in France and Belgium. The literal translation is street or avenue of the Church.

== Belgium ==
Rue de l'Église is the most common street name in Belgium. Brussels has two:

- Rue de l'Église, Berchem-Sainte-Agathe
- Rue de l'Église, Woluwe-Saint-Pierre

== France ==
In France, Rue de l'Église is the most used street name before Place de l'Église (Church Place) and Grande Rue. La Poste lists nearly 8,000: 20% of French communes have a route named in this way.

Streets with the name in France include:

- Rue de l'Église, Colmar
- Rue de l'Église, Épinay-sur-Seine
- Rue de l'Église, Montreuil
- Rue de l'Église, Nanterre
- Rue de l'Église, Paris, (street of the old town in Grenelle, annexed by Paris in 1860), referring to the Church of Saint-Jean-Baptiste de Grenelle.

== See also ==
- Church Street (disambiguation)
- Street or road name
