= Church Street station (disambiguation) =

Church Street Station is a historic train station and commercial development in Orlando, Florida, United States.

Church Street station may also refer to:

- Church Street tram stop in London
- Church Street station (MBTA), an MBTA commuter rail station in New Bedford, Massachusetts, US
- Church station (Muni Metro), a subway station in San Francisco, US
- Church station (North Shore Line), a defunct North Shore Line station in Evanston, Illinois
- Church Street Station, post office at 90 Church Street in New York City

== See also ==
- Church Street (disambiguation)
- Church station (disambiguation)
- Church Road railway station (disambiguation)
