= Church Street (Enfield ward) =

Electoral ward in London, England

- Former electoral ward for the Enfield London Borough Council
- Borough: Enfield
- County: Greater London
- Major settlements: Edmonton

Former electoral ward
- Created: 1965
- Abolished: 1982
- Councillors: 2

External image
- Map showing Church Street ward boundaries from 1965 to 1982

Church Street was an electoral ward in the London Borough of Enfield from 1965 to 1982. The ward was first used in the 1964 elections and last used for the 1978 elections. It returned two councillors to Enfield London Borough Council. The ward covered part of Edmonton. For elections to the Greater London Council, the ward was part of the Enfield electoral division from 1965 and then the Edmonton division from 1973. The ward was only represented by Conservative Party councillors.

== Haringey council elections ==
=== 1978 election ===
The election took place on 4 May 1978.

=== 1974 election ===
The election took place on 2 May 1974.

=== 1971 by-election ===
The by-election took place on 24 June 1971.

1971 Church Street by-election
Party	Candidate	Votes	%	±%
Conservative	C. Goldwater	1,409		
Labour	M. Tarling	1,290		
Liberal	E. King	82		
Turnout			37.3%	
Conservative hold		Swing		

=== 1971 election ===
The election took place on 13 May 1971.

=== 1969 by-election ===
The by-election took place on 25 September 1969.

1969 Church Street by-election
Party	Candidate	Votes	%	±%
Conservative	E. Cousins	1,259		
Labour	R. Daultry	548		
Liberal	L. Barrows	144		
Turnout			27.8	
Conservative hold		Swing		

=== 1968 by-election ===
The by-election took place on 4 July 1968.

1968 Church Street by-election
Party	Candidate	Votes	%	±%
Conservative	R. Fenn	1,296		
Labour	J. Lightfoot	405		
Liberal	J. Cross	119		
Turnout			25.5%	
Conservative hold		Swing		

=== 1968 election ===
The election took place on 9 May 1968.

=== 1964 election ===
The election took place on 7 May 1964.

1964 Enfield London Borough Council election: Church Street
Party	Candidate	Votes	%	±%
Conservative	E. McNern	1,761		
Conservative	E. Taylor	1,740		
Labour	J. Lightfoot	1,174		
Labour	M. Simpson	1,139		
Liberal	R. Hull	171		
Liberal	H. Holsgrove	170		
Turnout		3,115	43.3	
Conservative win (new seat)				
Conservative win (new seat)				
