= Zephyrhills Downtown Historic District =

Historic district in Florida, United States

- U.S. National Register of Historic Places
- U.S. Historic district
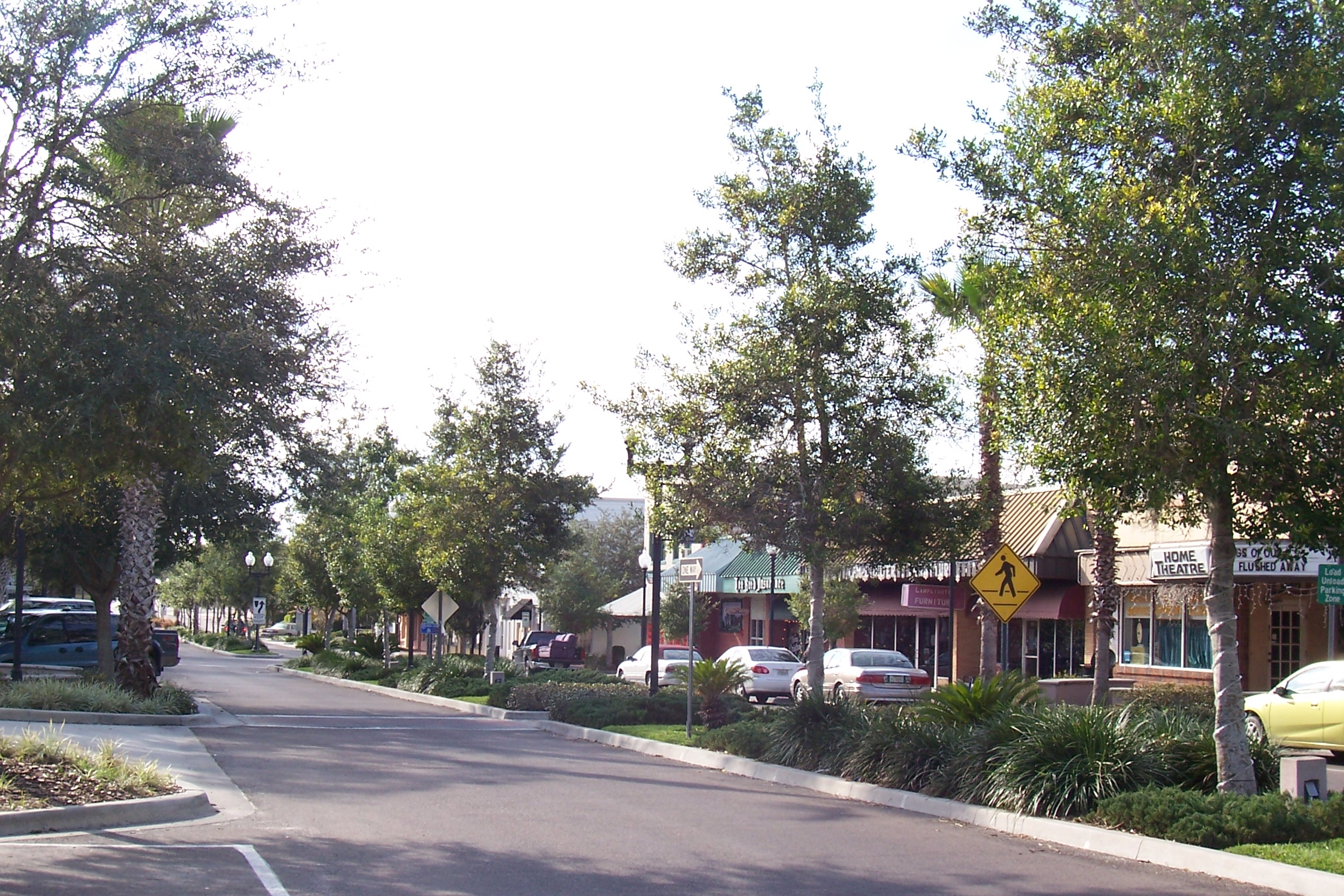
- View down 5th Avenue

- Location within Florida Location within the United States
- Location: Zephyrhills, Florida United States
- Coordinates: 28°14′4″N 82°10′46″W
- Area: 84 acres (34 ha)
- Built: 1910
- NRHP reference No.: 01001058
- Added to NRHP: September 27, 2001

The Zephyrhills Downtown Historic District is a historic district in Zephyrhills, Florida. It is bounded by South Avenue, 9th Avenue, 7th Street and 11th Street, and contains 126 contributing buildings on 84 acres (34 ha). On September 27, 2001, it was added to the U.S. National Register of Historic Places. The district includes the Capt. Harold B. Jeffries House which was built in 1911 and was the home of city founder, Capt. Jeffries.

It is a residential and commercial area.

It includes the Zephyrhills Woman's Club, which houses the local women's civic organization founded in early days of the town. It was built as part of Works Project Administration projects in the 1930s.

It includes the City Hall, also built as a WPA project, built in Art Deco style in 1940. It has a Mission-inspired parapet and corner battlements.

== Gallery ==
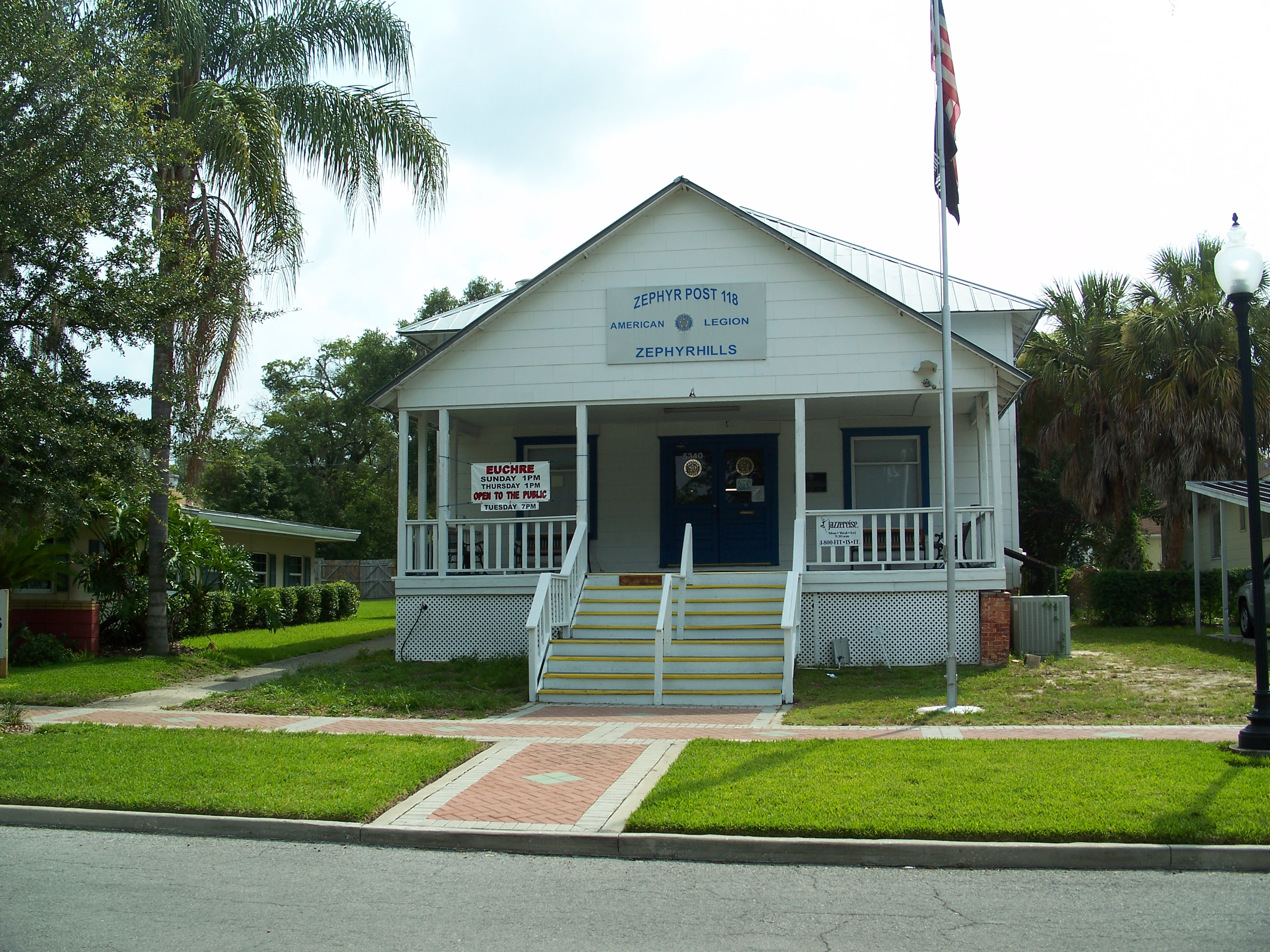
GAR hall

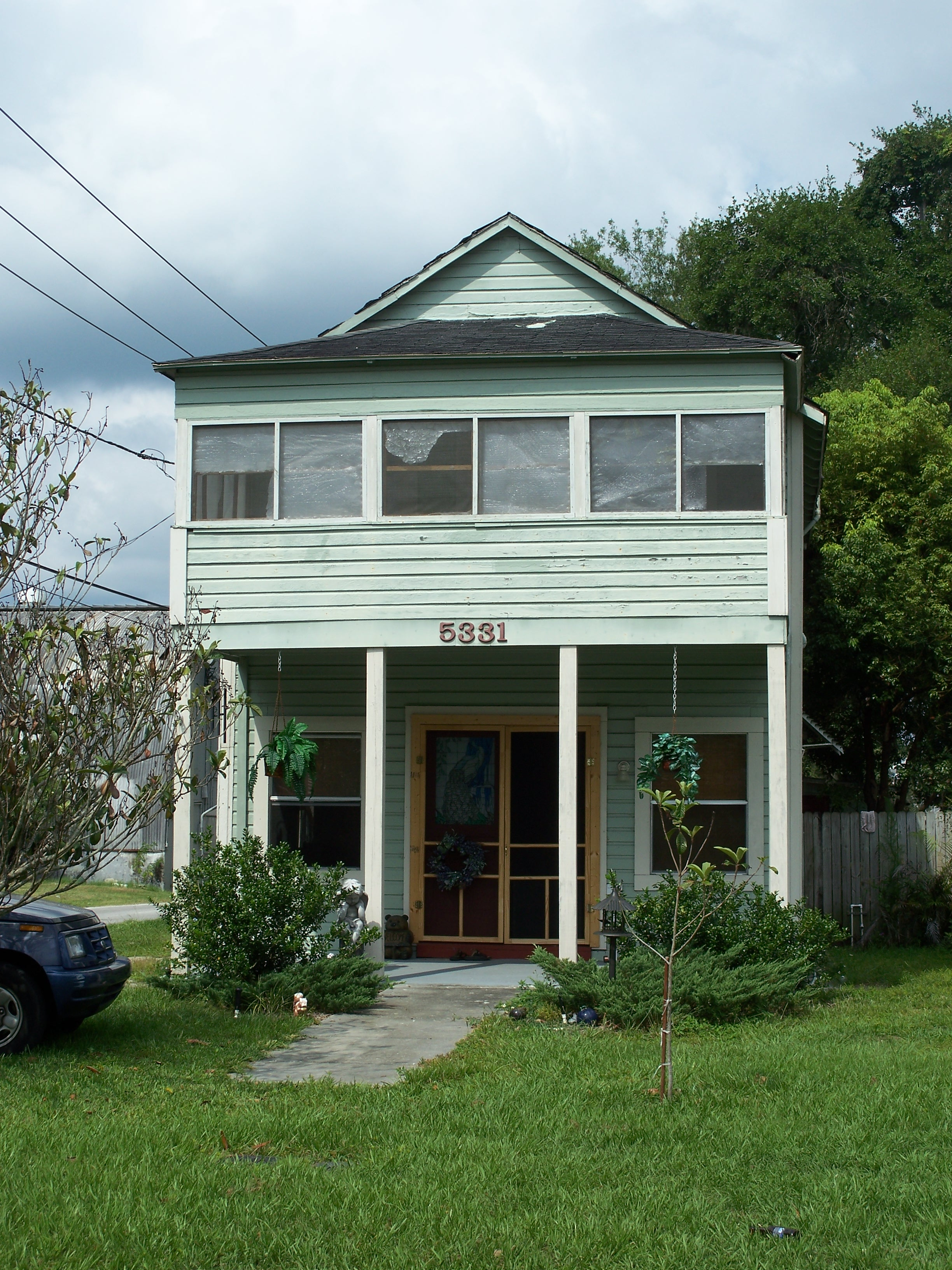
House in the district

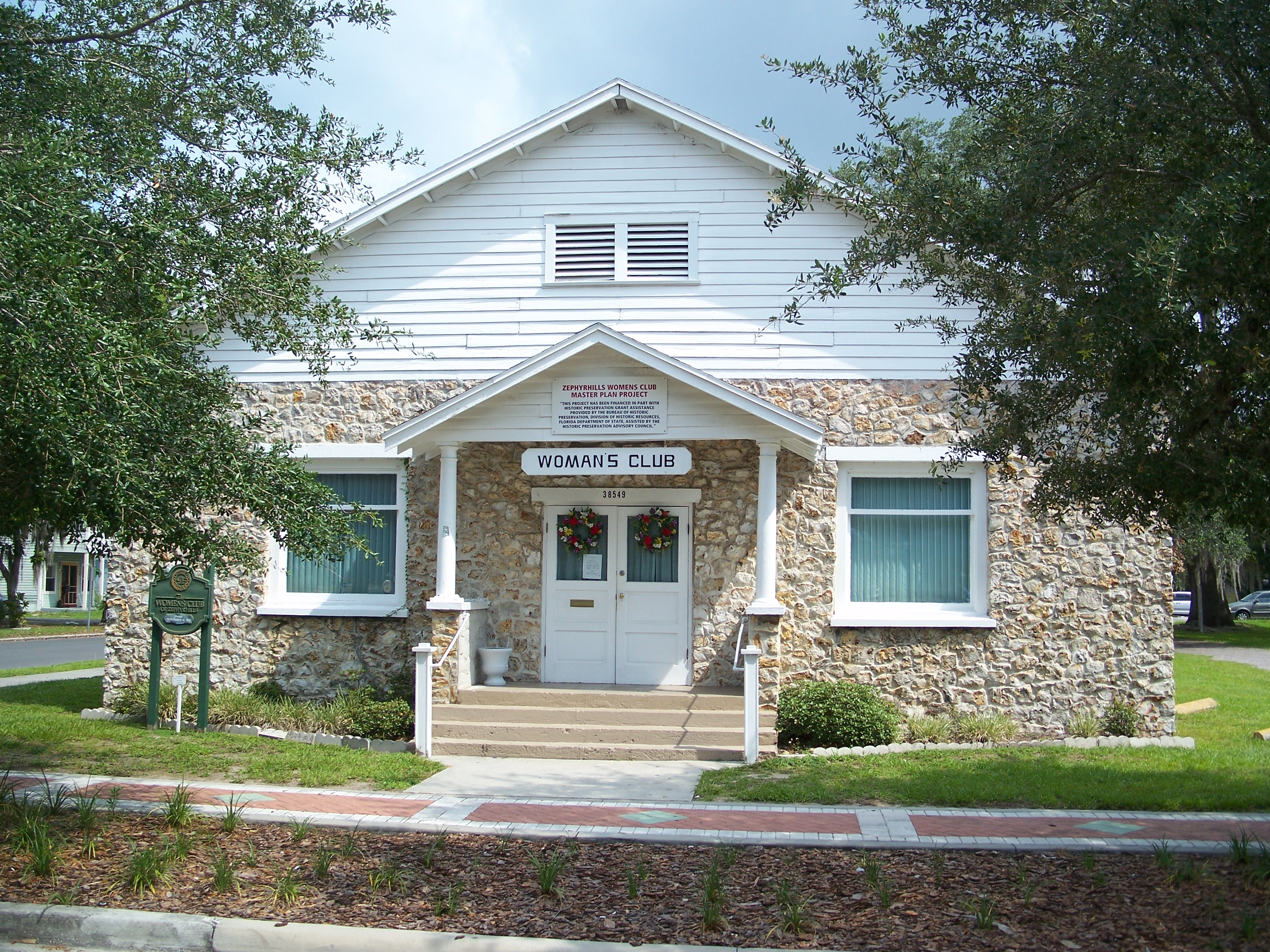
Women's club
