= Church Road railway station (disambiguation) =

Church Road railway station was a station in Edgbaston, Birmingham, England.

Church Road railway station may also refer to:

- Church Road railway station (Wales), in Newport, South Wales
- Church Road Garston railway station, in Garston, Liverpool, England
- Harrington Church Road Halt railway station, in Cumbria, England
- St Mary Church Road railway station, in the Vale of Glamorgan, South Wales

== See also ==
- Church Street station (disambiguation)
- Church station (disambiguation)
