= South Church Manse =

Historic house in New Jersey, United States

- U.S. National Register of Historic Places
- New Jersey Register of Historic Places
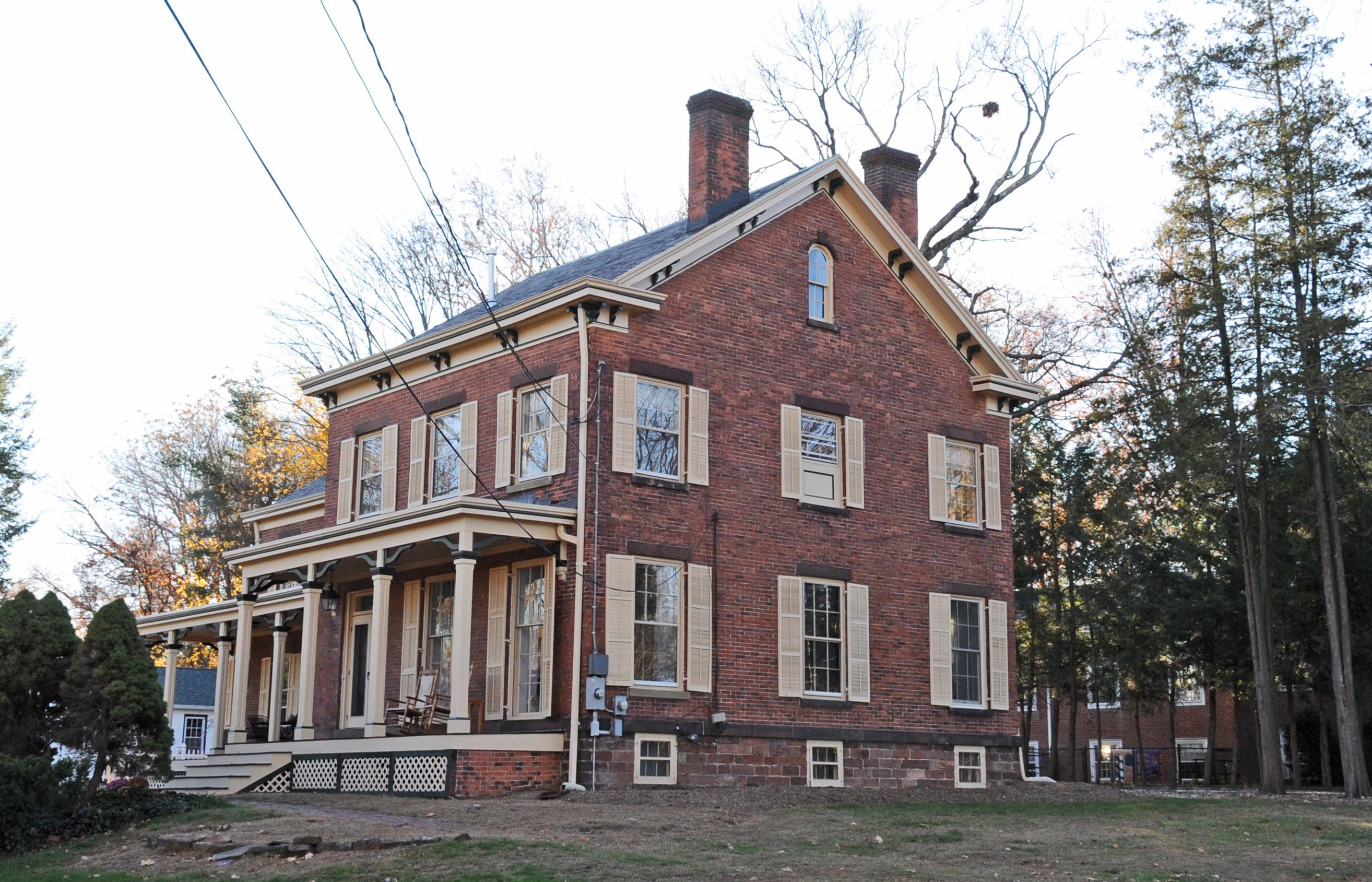

- Location within Bergen County, New Jersey Location within New Jersey Location within the United States
- Location: 138 W. Church Street, Bergenfield, New Jersey
- Coordinates: 40°55′44″N 74°0′10″W
- Area: 2 acres (0.81 ha)
- Built: 1861
- Architectural style: Late Victorian
- NRHP reference No.: 79001470
- NJRHP No.: 434

Significant dates
- Added to NRHP: August 24, 1979
- Designated NJRHP: May 18, 1979

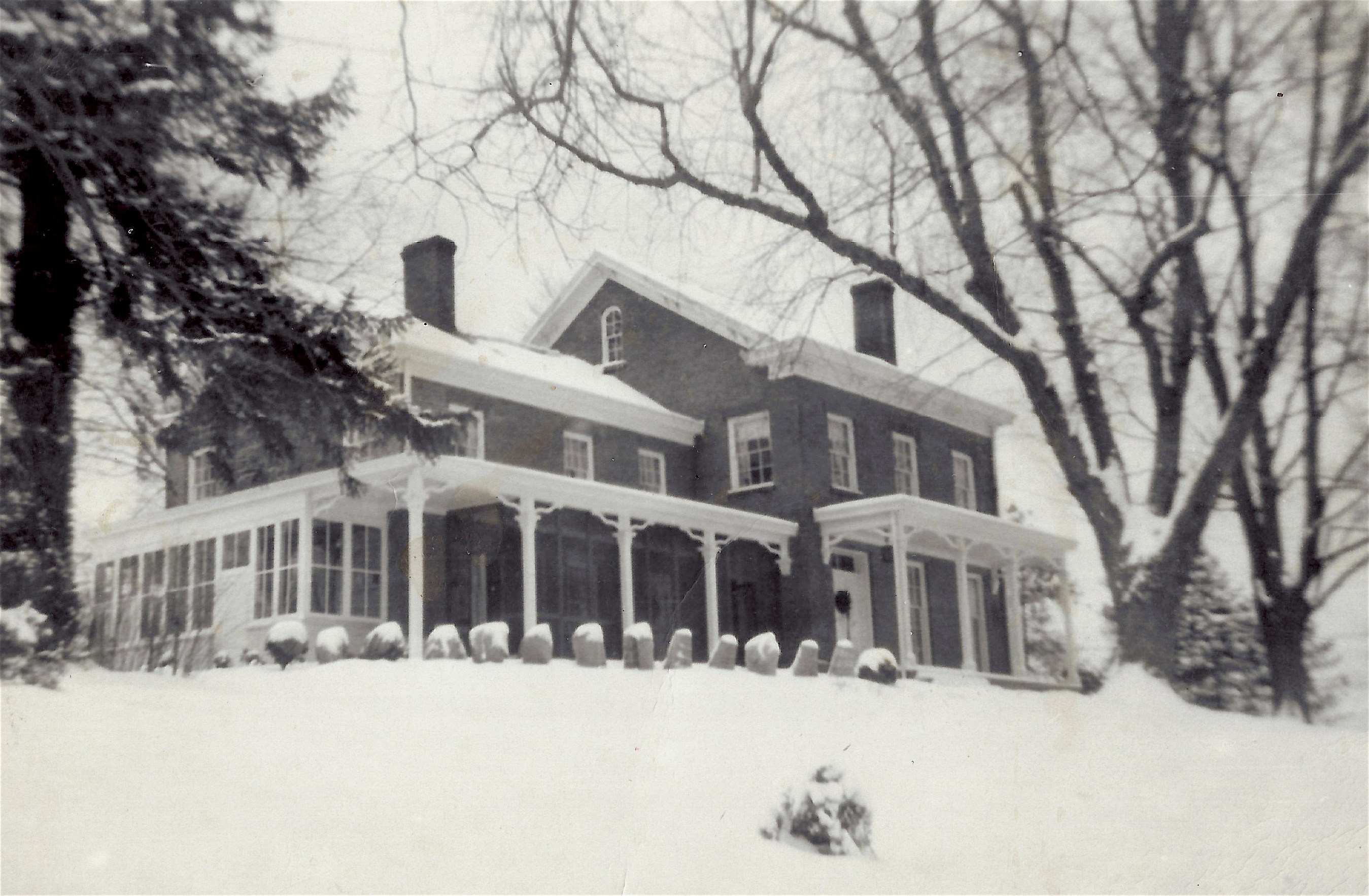
South Church Manse in the 1940s (?)

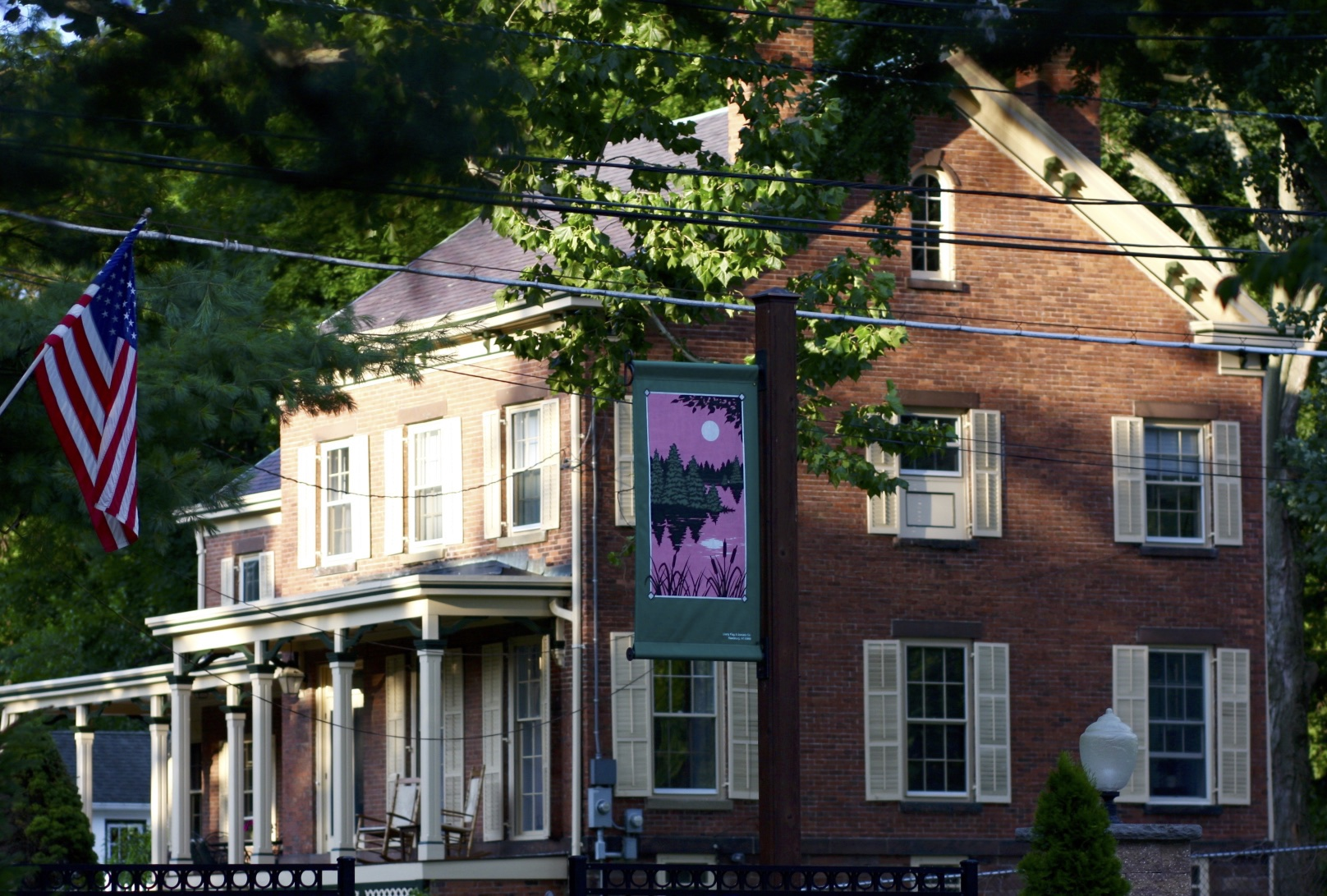
South Church Manse in 2015

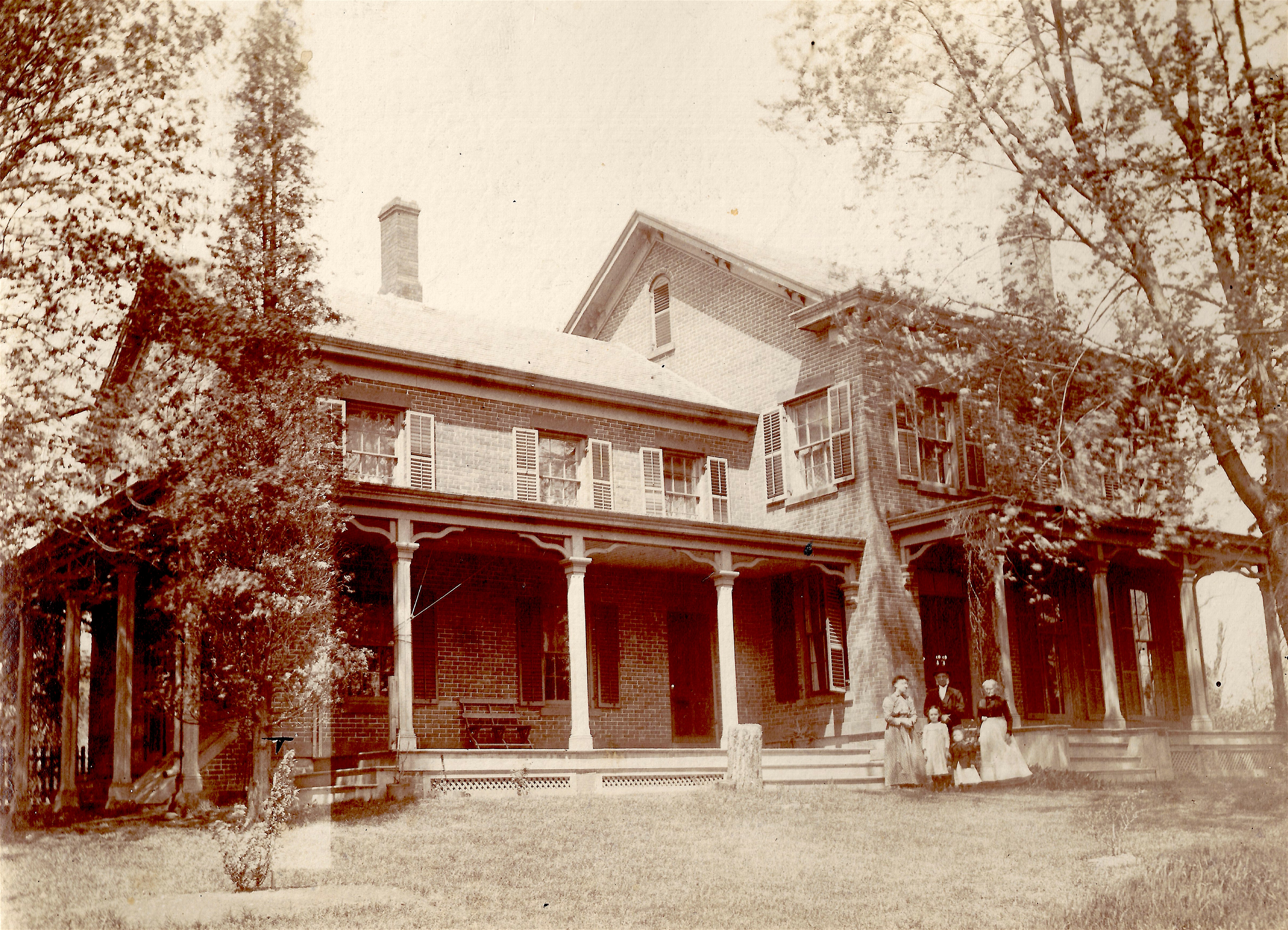
South Church Manse in 1870

South Church Manse is a historic church parsonage at 138 W. Church Street in Bergenfield, Bergen County, New Jersey, United States.

It was built in 1861 and added to the National Register of Historic Places in 1979.

== See also ==
- National Register of Historic Places listings in Bergen County, New Jersey
