= Church (programming language) =

Church refers to both a family of LISP-like probabilistic programming languages for specifying arbitrary probabilistic programs, as well as a set of algorithms for performing probabilistic inference in the generative models those programs define. Church was originally developed at MIT, primarily in the computational cognitive science group, run by Joshua Tenenbaum. Several different inference algorithms and concrete languages are in existence, including Bher, MIT-Church, Cosh, Venture, and Anglican.
