= Churching =

Churching may refer to:

- Churching of women is the ceremony wherein a purification and blessing is given to mothers after recovery from childbirth in both Eastern and Western Christian traditions
- The attendance of any church activity, including Sunday School, sacrament meetings, and weekday activities.
