= Church (Hyndburn ward) =

- Shown within Hyndburn
- Area: 2.18 km^{2} (0.84 sq mi)
- Population: 4,714 (2011)
  - Density: 2,162/km^{2} (5,600/sq mi)
- District: Hyndburn
- Ceremonial county: Lancashire
- Region: North West
- Country: England
- Sovereign state: United Kingdom
- UK Parliament: Hyndburn
- Councillors: Jean Battle (Labour); Loraine Cox (Labour)

Church is one of the 18 electoral wards that form the Parliamentary constituency of Hyndburn, Lancashire, England. The ward returns two councillors to represent Church village on the Hyndburn Borough Council. As of the May 2019 Council election, Church had an electorate of 3,591.
