= Wilmington Centre Village Historic District =

Historic district in Massachusetts, United States

- U.S. National Register of Historic Places
- U.S. Historic district
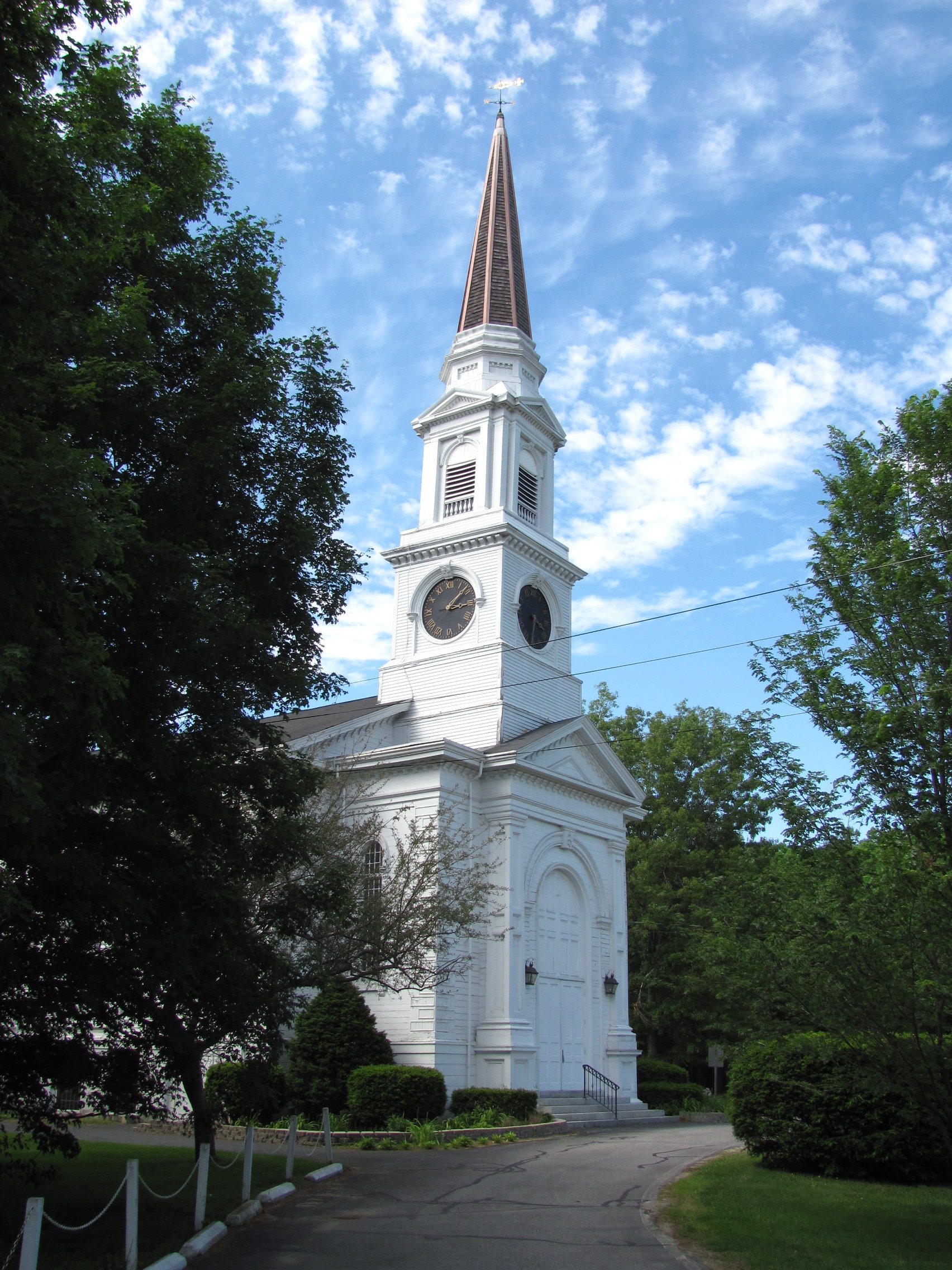
- Congregational Church

- Location within Massachusetts Location within the United States
- Location: Wilmington, Massachusetts
- Coordinates: 42°33′22″N 71°9′52″W
- Architect: Horner, Halsey B.; Wilson, Edward F.
- Architectural style: Greek Revival, Queen Anne, Federal
- NRHP reference No.: 92000246
- Added to NRHP: April 8, 1992

The Wilmington Centre Village Historic District encompasses the historic center of the town of Wilmington, Massachusetts. It stretches along Church and Middlesex Streets, from the town common in the southwest to the Old Burial Ground in the northeast. The area was established as a local civic center in the 1730s with the construction of a meeting house and the cemetery. The village center experienced some growth in the early decades of the 19th century due to the presence of a factory-style bakery, but it suffered from a lack of railroad connections in later years. The town common, which anchors the southern end of the district, was laid out in the 1890s.

The district was listed on the National Register of Historic Places in 1992.

== See also ==
- National Register of Historic Places listings in Middlesex County, Massachusetts
