= Church Street Row =

Historic house in New York, United States

- U.S. National Register of Historic Places
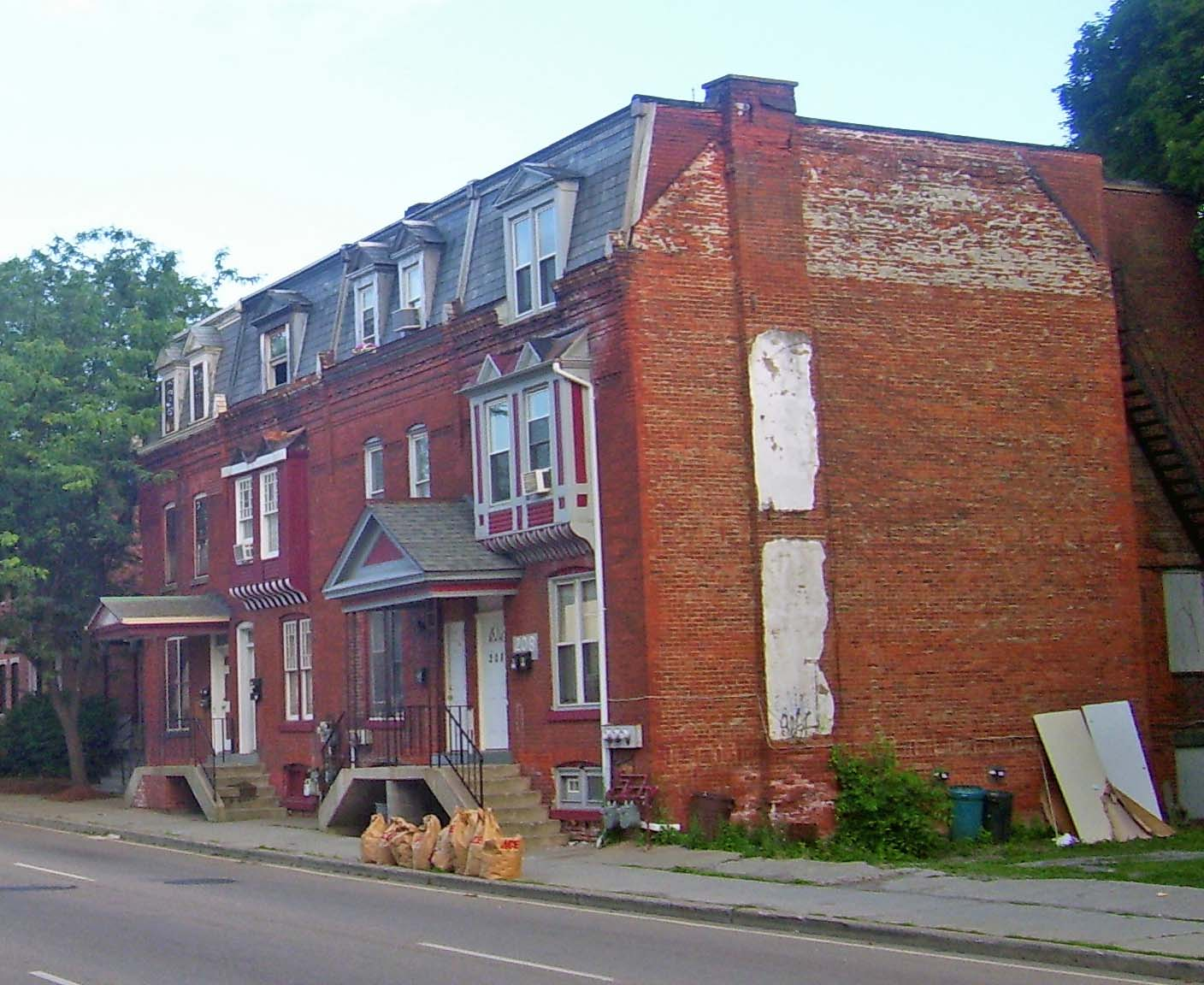
- West end of row, 2008
- Location: Poughkeepsie, NY
- Coordinates: 41°42′01″N 73°55′32″W
- Area: 2 acres (8,100 m^{2})
- Built: 1855-1895
- Architectural style: Greek Revival, Late Victorian
- MPS: Poughkeepsie MRA
- NRHP reference No.: 82001126
- Added to NRHP: November 26, 1982

Church Street Row is a group of nine residential buildings along the south side of Church Street (US 44/NY 55) between Academy and Hamilton streets in Poughkeepsie, New York, United States. They were added to the National Register of Historic Places in 1982.

They were built during the years from 1855 to 1895. The earliest, at the corner of Church and Hamilton, are frame clapboard houses in the Greek Revival style. Later buildings used brick, incorporating elements of a variety of styles — Gothic Revival, Second Empire and Queen Anne — that were popular at the times of construction. The eclectic result is the city's largest collection of brick houses in one place.
