= Church Lake =

Lake in the state of Minnesota, United States

- Location within Minnesota
- Location: Grant County, Minnesota
- Coordinates: 45°52′46″N 95°47′56″W
- Type: lake

Church Lake is a lake in Grant County, in the U.S. state of Minnesota.

Church Lake took its name from a church which stood near its shore.
