= South Church Street Historic District (Lewisburg, West Virginia) =

Historic district in West Virginia, United States

- U.S. National Register of Historic Places
- U.S. Historic district
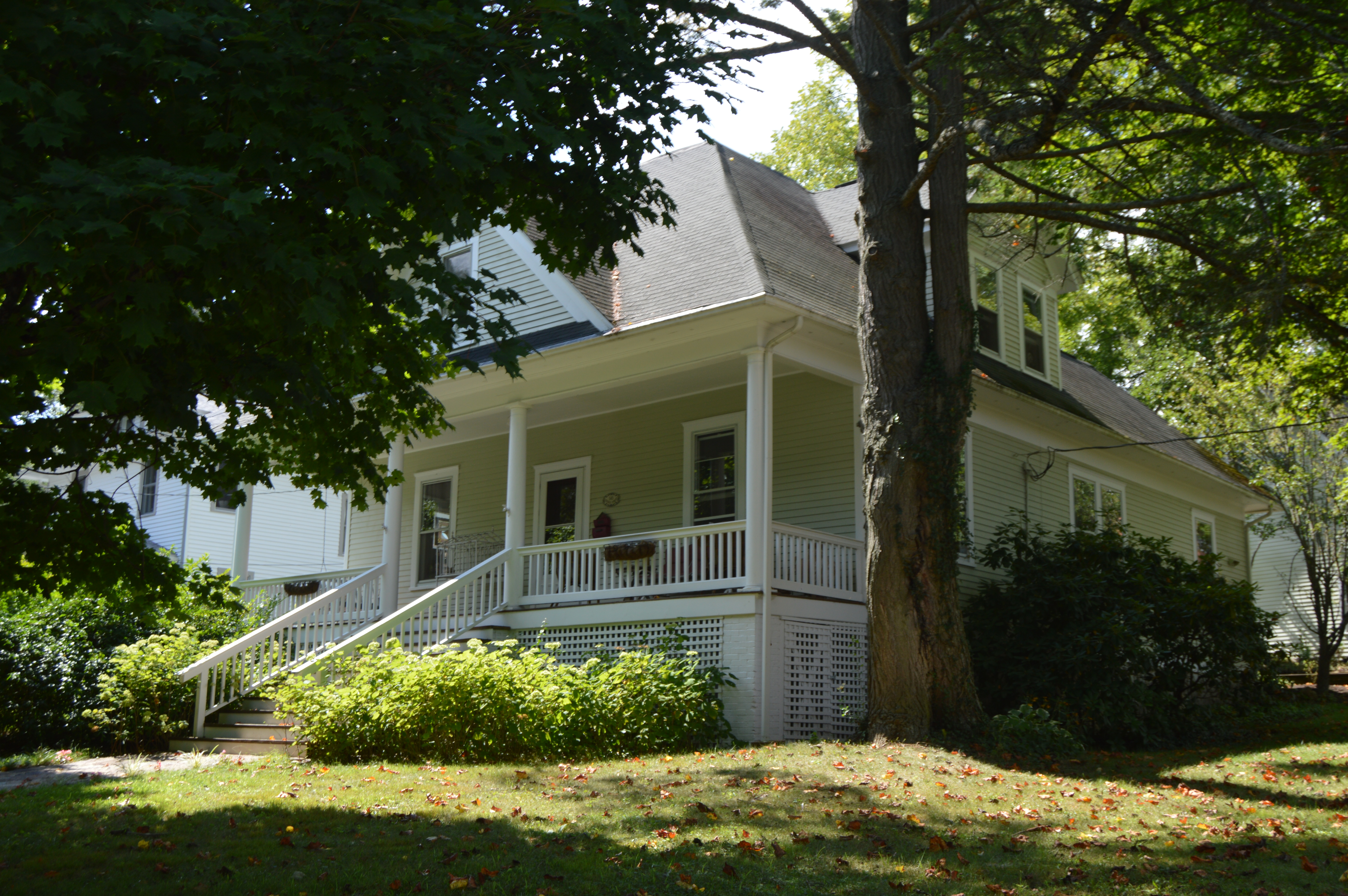
- House at the northern end of the district

- Location within West Virginia Location within the United States
- Location: S. Church St., Lewisburg, West Virginia
- Coordinates: 37°48′2″N 80°27′0″W
- Area: 3.1 acres (1.3 ha)
- Built: 1908-1918
- Architectural style: Bungalow/craftsman, Queen Anne
- NRHP reference No.: 87002528
- Added to NRHP: February 2, 1988

South Church Street Historic District is a national historic district located at Lewisburg, Greenbrier County, West Virginia. The district encompasses six contributing buildings, including three single family residences built between 1908 and 1918. They are representative of the Queen Anne and Bungalow styles. Each of the houses has a contributing garage on the property.

It was listed on the National Register of Historic Places in 1988.
