= Church Street–Cady Hill Historic District =

Historic district in Massachusetts, United States

- U.S. National Register of Historic Places
- U.S. Historic district
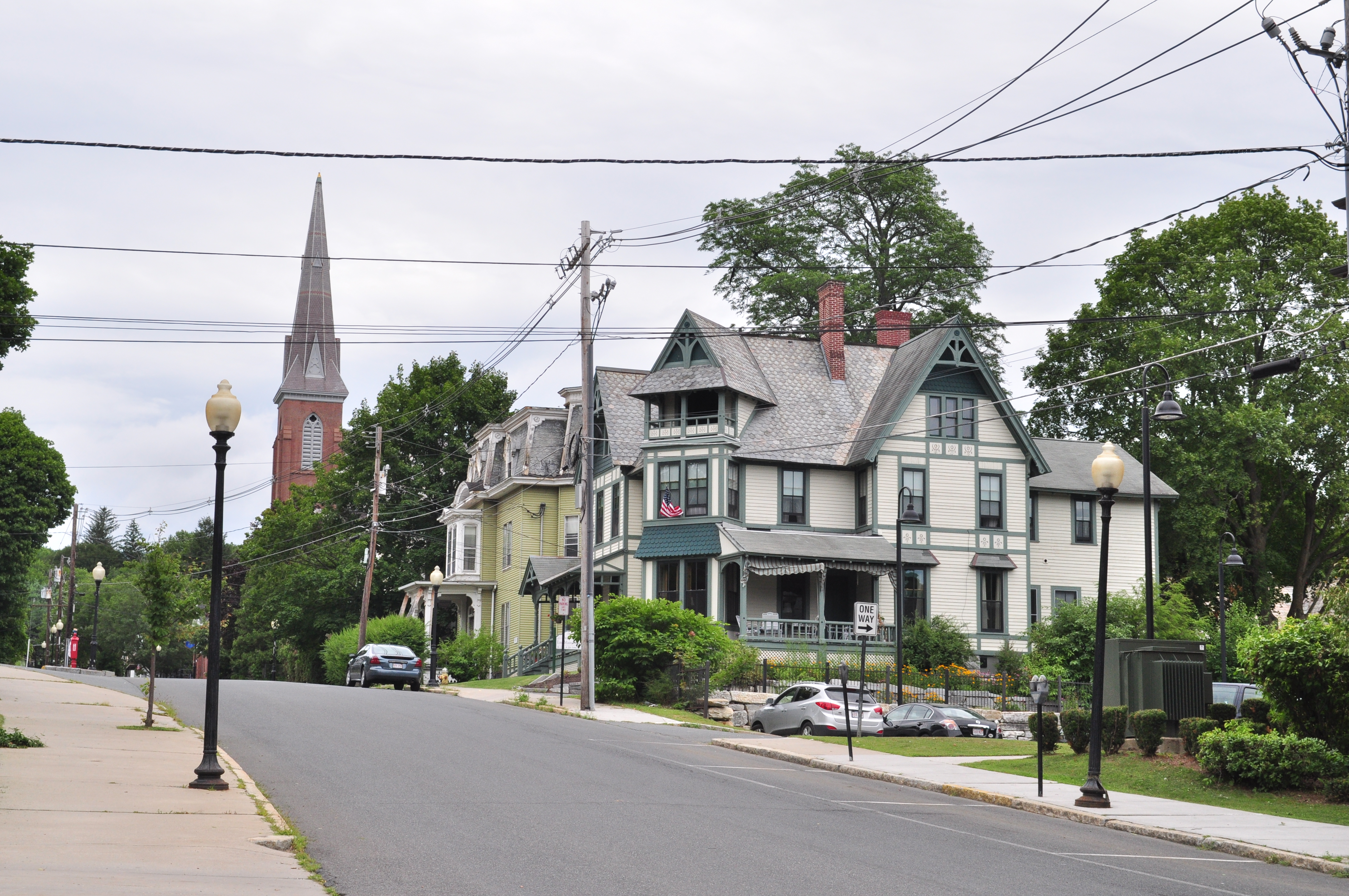
- East Main Street

- Location within Massachusetts Location within the United States
- Location: Roughly E. Main St. from Church to Pleasant St., and Church St. from Summer St. to Elmwood Ave. (original); Roughly bounded by E. Main and Holbrook Sts., Wall and Meadow Sts., Elmwood Ave., and Perry, South, and Ashland Sts. (1985 increase); North Adams, Massachusetts
- Coordinates: 42°41′48″N 73°6′26″W
- Area: 580 acres (230 ha) (after 1985 increase)
- Built: various
- Architect: various
- Architectural style: Late 19th And 20th Century Revivals, Late Victorian (original); Mid 19th Century Revival (1985 increase)
- MPS: North Adams MRA (AD)
- NRHP reference No.: 83000567 (original); 85003376 (increase)

Significant dates
- Added to NRHP: March 10, 1983
- Boundary increase: October 25, 1985

The Church Street–Cady Hill Historic District, originally known as the Church Street Historic District, is a historic district in North Adams, Massachusetts. It was first listed on the National Register of Historic Places in 1983 and was expanded and renamed in 1985. The district encompasses the principal residential areas near the center of downtown. When first designated it included residences primarily on East Main Street and Church Street, as well as properties in the neighborhood south of East Main and east of Church; the 1985 expansion extended the district further east and west, to properties on Ashland Street and streets connecting it to Church Street to the west, and the properties along Pleasant Street, Cherry Street, and adjacent streets to the east of Church Street.

Church Street, the area's principal route, was laid out about 1780, and is one of the city's oldest roads. Residential development in the area remained modest until the 1850s, and in the subsequent decades a significant number of Italianate and Second Empire houses were built on Church Street and adjacent side streets, which were laid out beginning in the 1840s. Later development extended further from Church Street, with a fine assembly of Stick and Queen Anne style houses on Holbrook and Cherry Streets to the east. Most of these houses were not designed by architects; one (27 Wall Street) is based on a pattern published by Palliser, Palliser & Company in one of its architectural design books.

== See also ==
- National Register of Historic Places listings in Berkshire County, Massachusetts
