= Capt. Howard B. Jeffries House =

Historic house in Florida, United States

- U.S. National Register of Historic Places
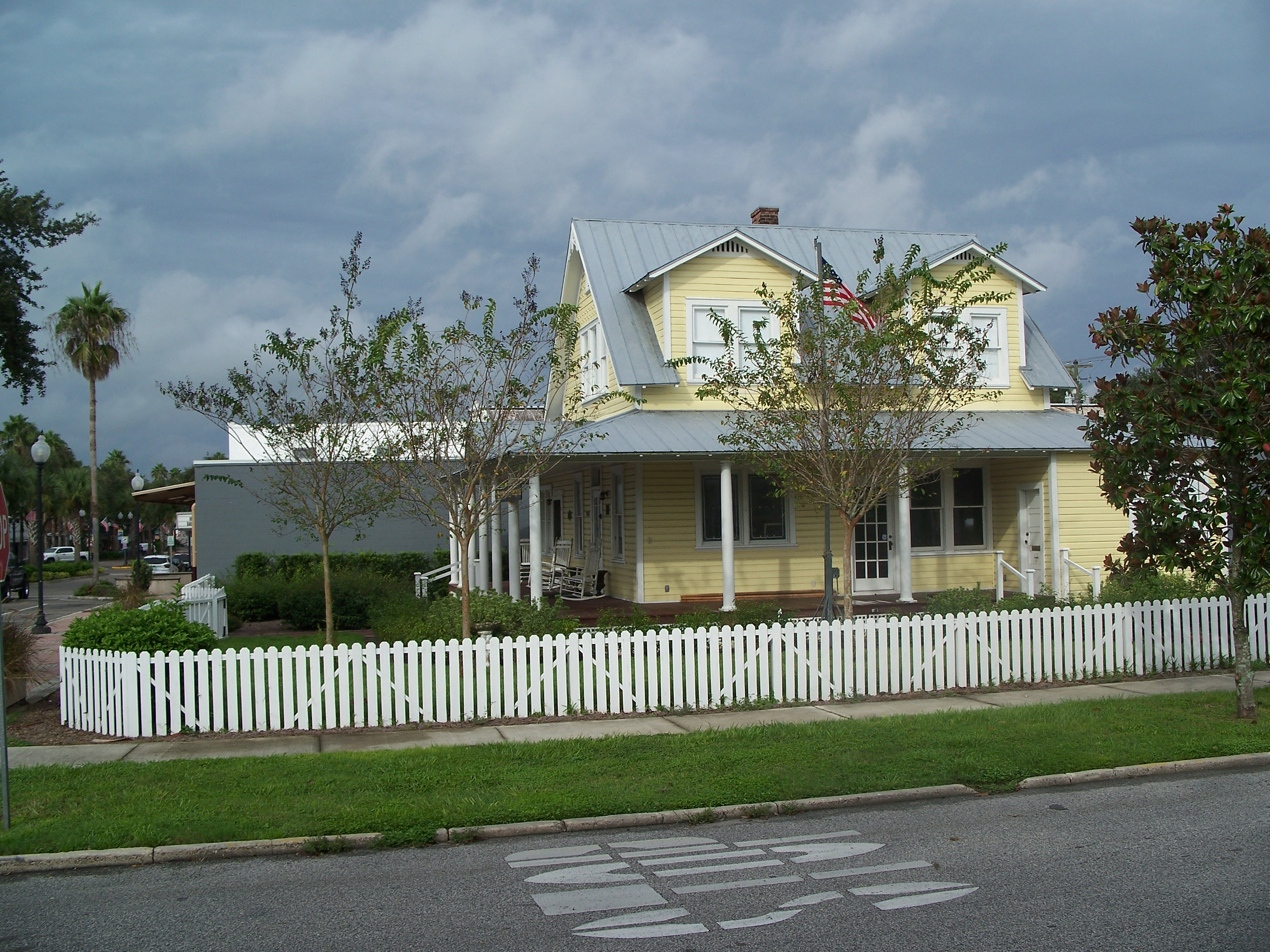

- Location within Florida Location within the United States
- Location: 38537 5th Avenue, Zephyrhills, Pasco County, Florida, USA
- Coordinates: 28°14′5.5″N 82°10′45″W
- Area: less than one acre
- Built: 1911
- Architectural style: Vernacular
- NRHP reference No.: 95001370
- Added to NRHP: 29 November 1995

The Capt. Howard B. Jeffries House is a historic house in Zephyrhills, Florida, United States. It is located in the Zephyrhills Downtown Historic District at 38537 5th Avenue.

== Description and history ==
On November 29, 1995, it was added to the U.S. National Register of Historic Places. The house was built in 1911, enlarged in the 1920s and 1940, and was the home of city founder, Captain Jeffries. Jeffries served in the Union army and established Zephyrhills as a retirement area for old Union soldiers. (Unfortunately, the 1995 application to add this site to the National Register of Historic Places incorrectly gave his first name as Harold. The National Register has corrected the listing, but the error persists on the Internet.

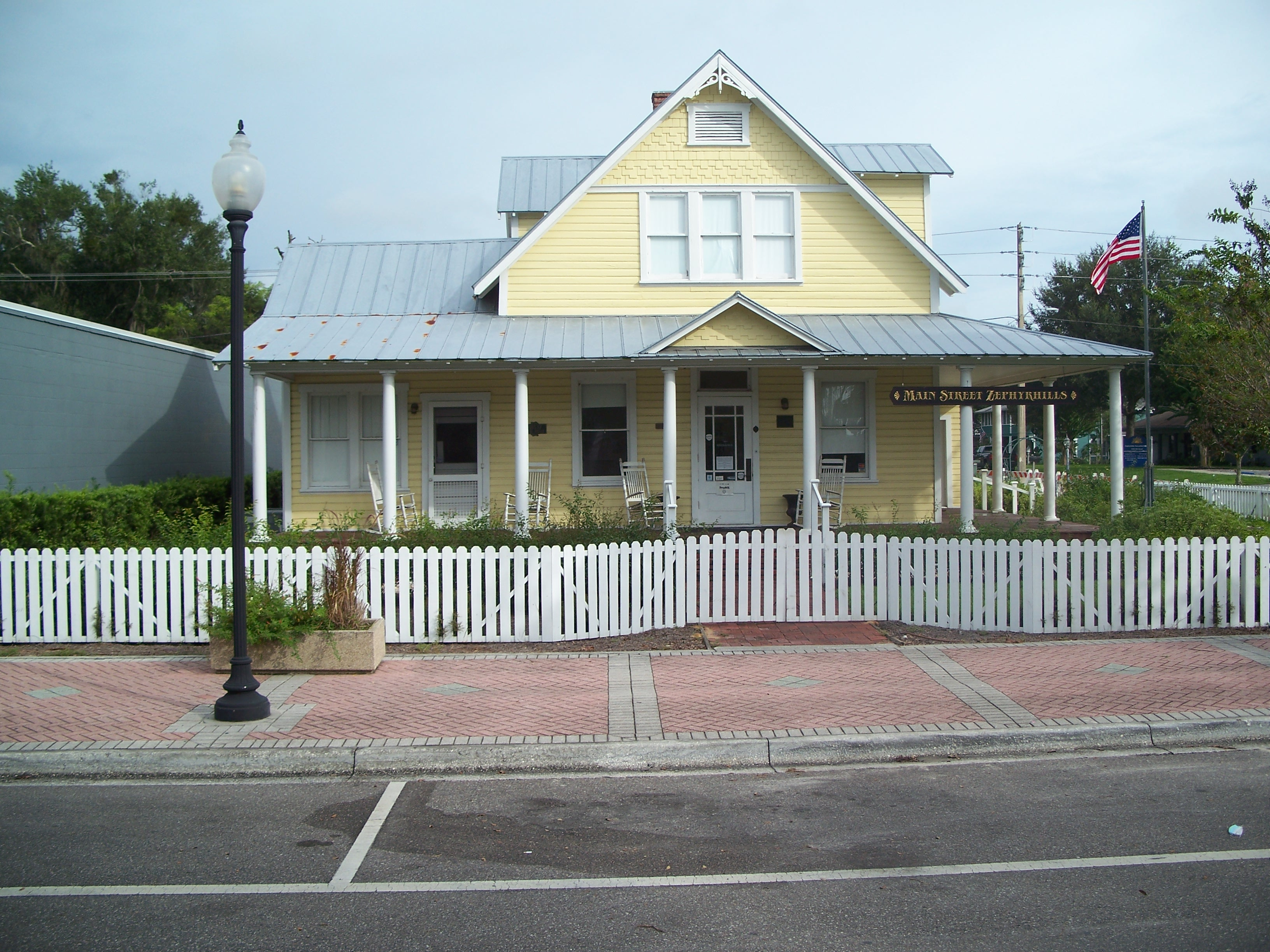
Capt. Howard B. Jeffries House, in Zephyrhills, Florida front view.

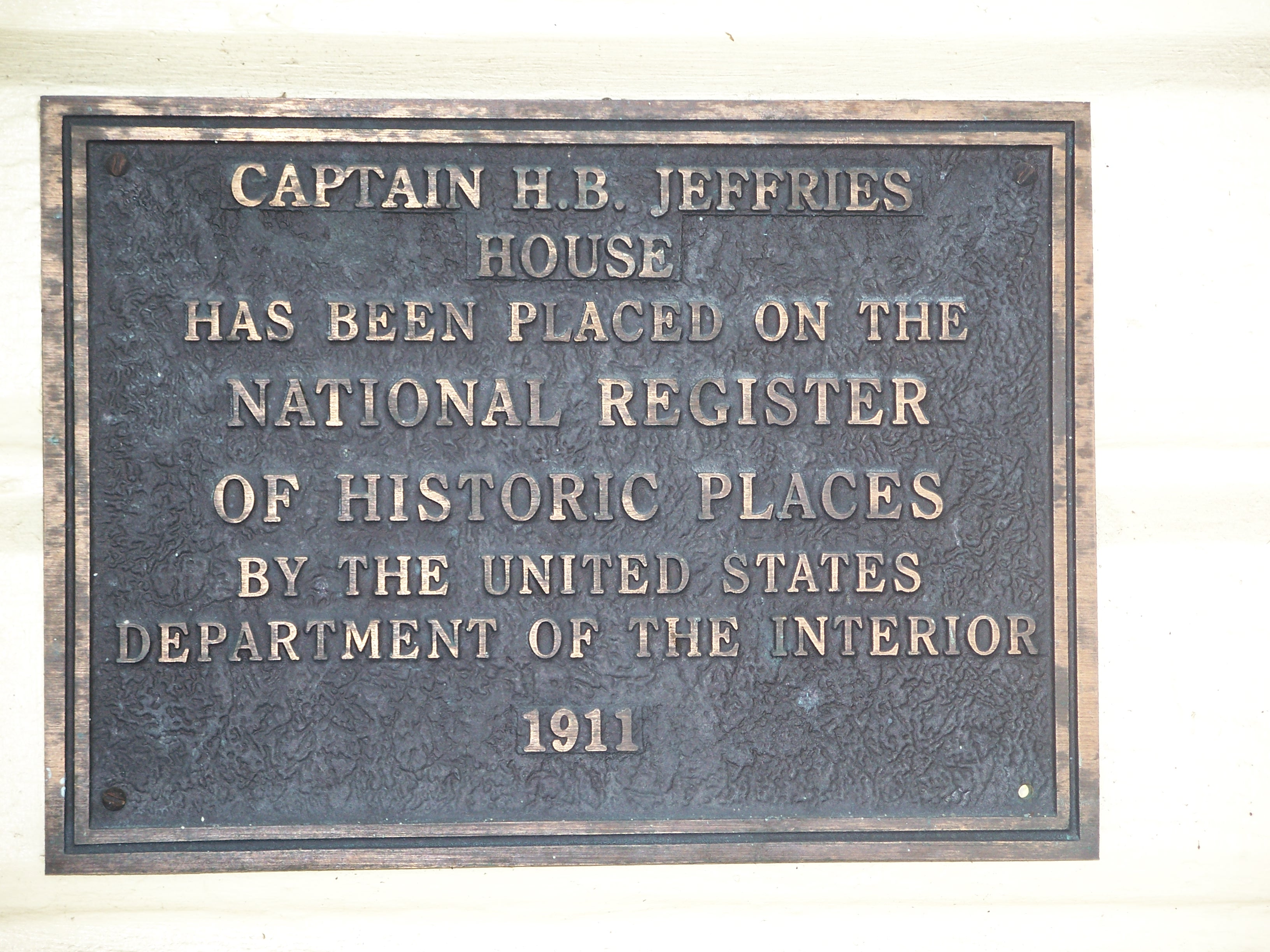
Plaque on Capt. Howard B. Jeffries House in Zephyrhills.
