= Church Street Historic District (Dade City, Florida) =

Historic district in Florida, United States

- U.S. National Register of Historic Places
- U.S. Historic district
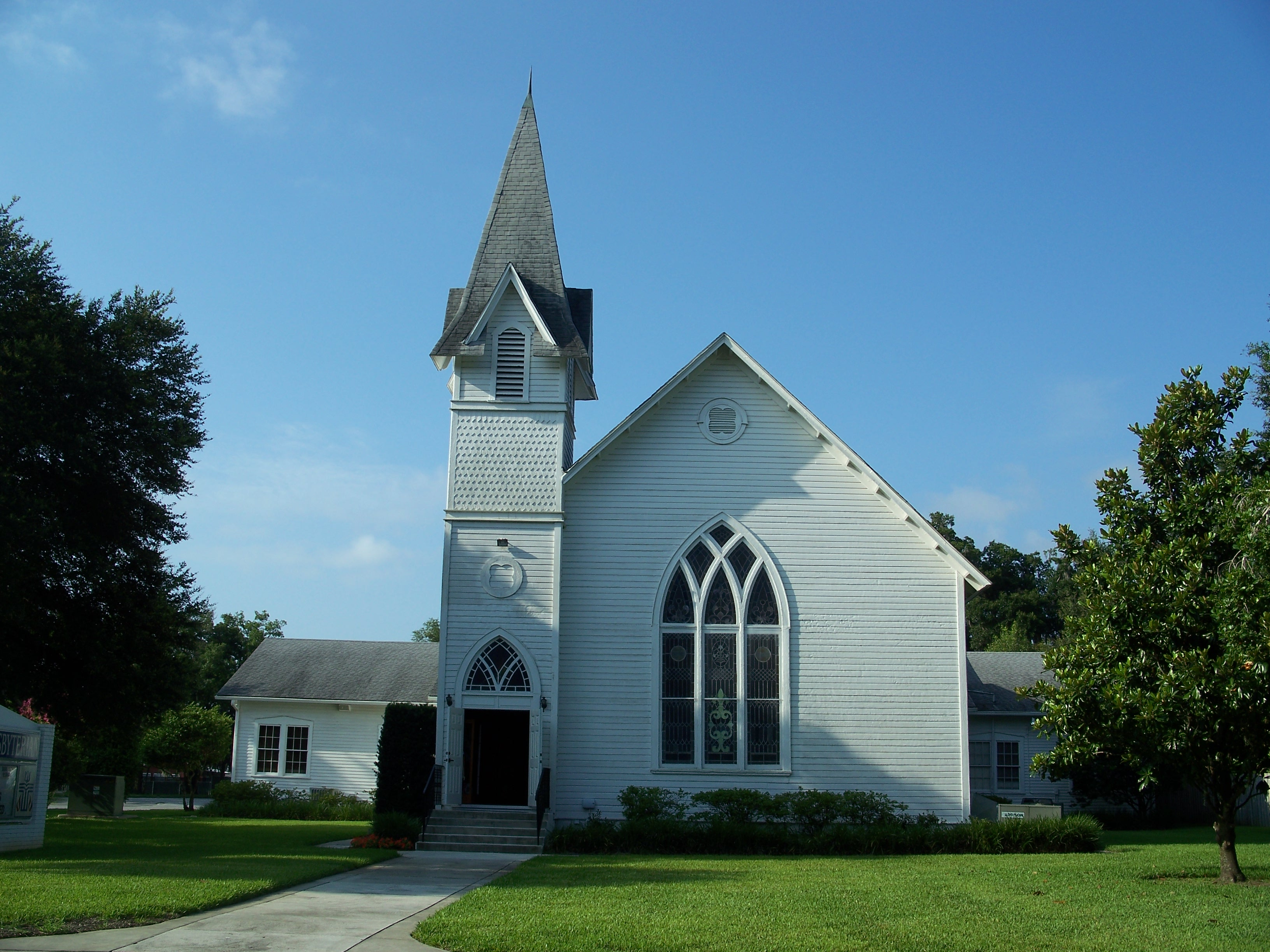
- First Presbyterian Church

- Location within Florida Location within the United States
- Location: Dade City, Florida United States
- Coordinates: 28°21′47″N 82°11′42″W
- Area: 14 acres (0.057 km^{2})
- Built: 1890
- NRHP reference No.: 97000910
- Added to NRHP: 21 August 1997

The Church Street Historic District is a historic district in Dade City, Florida. The district runs along Church Street, between 9th and 17th Streets. It covers 14 acres (0.057 km^{2}), and contains 34 historic buildings and 1 structure. On August 21, 1997, it was added to the U.S. National Register of Historic Places.

== Gallery ==
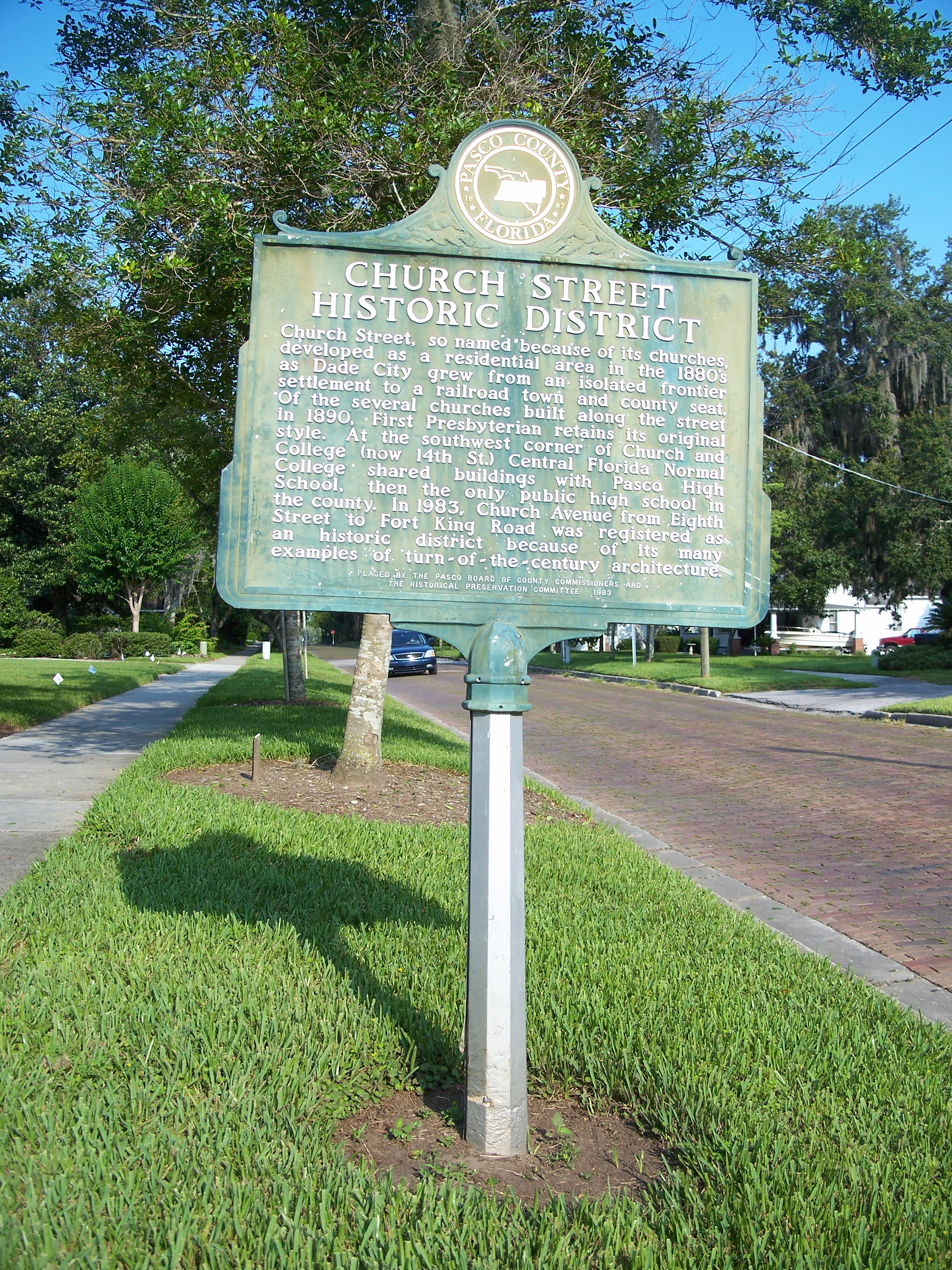
Historical marker

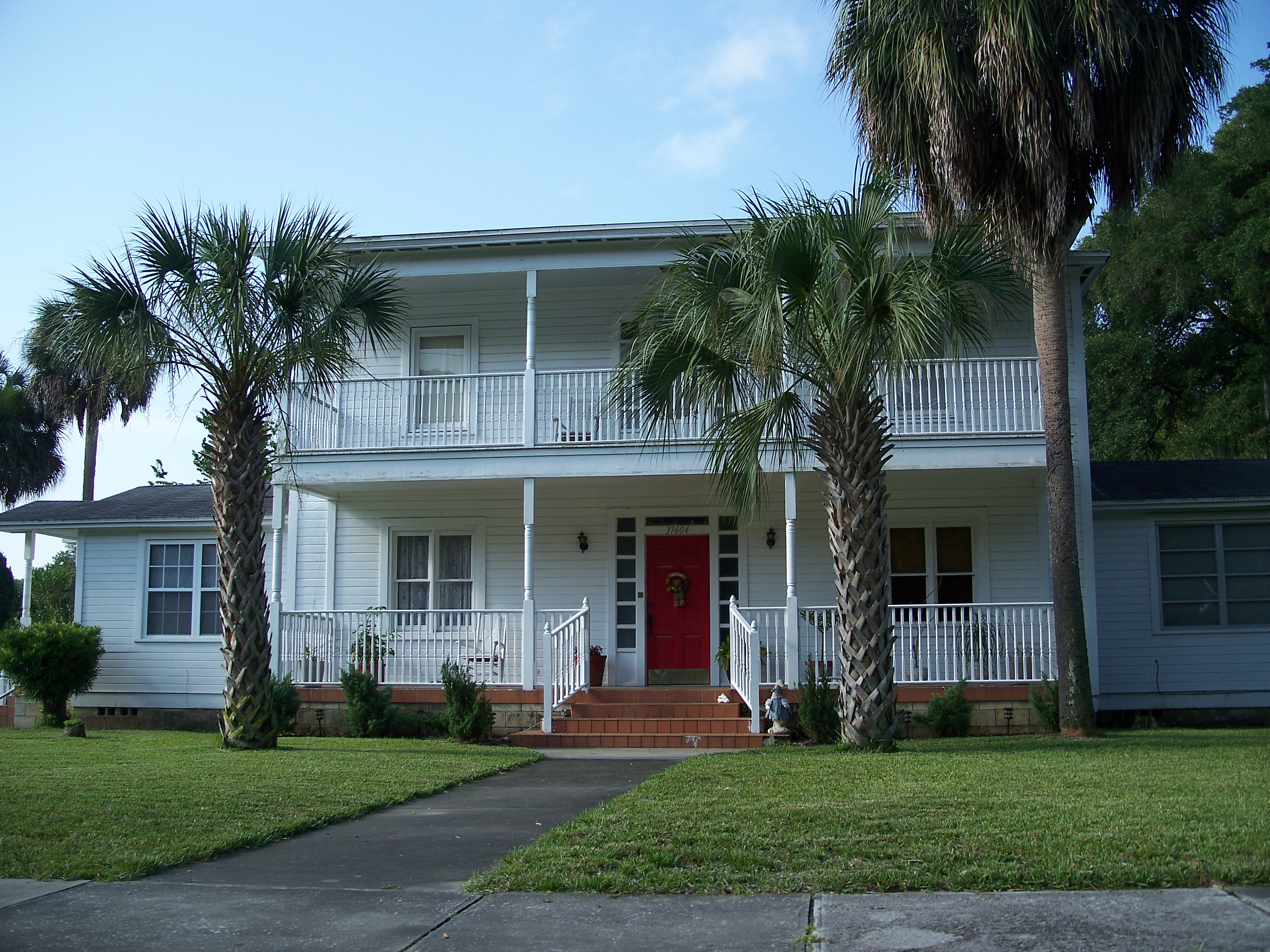
Platt House

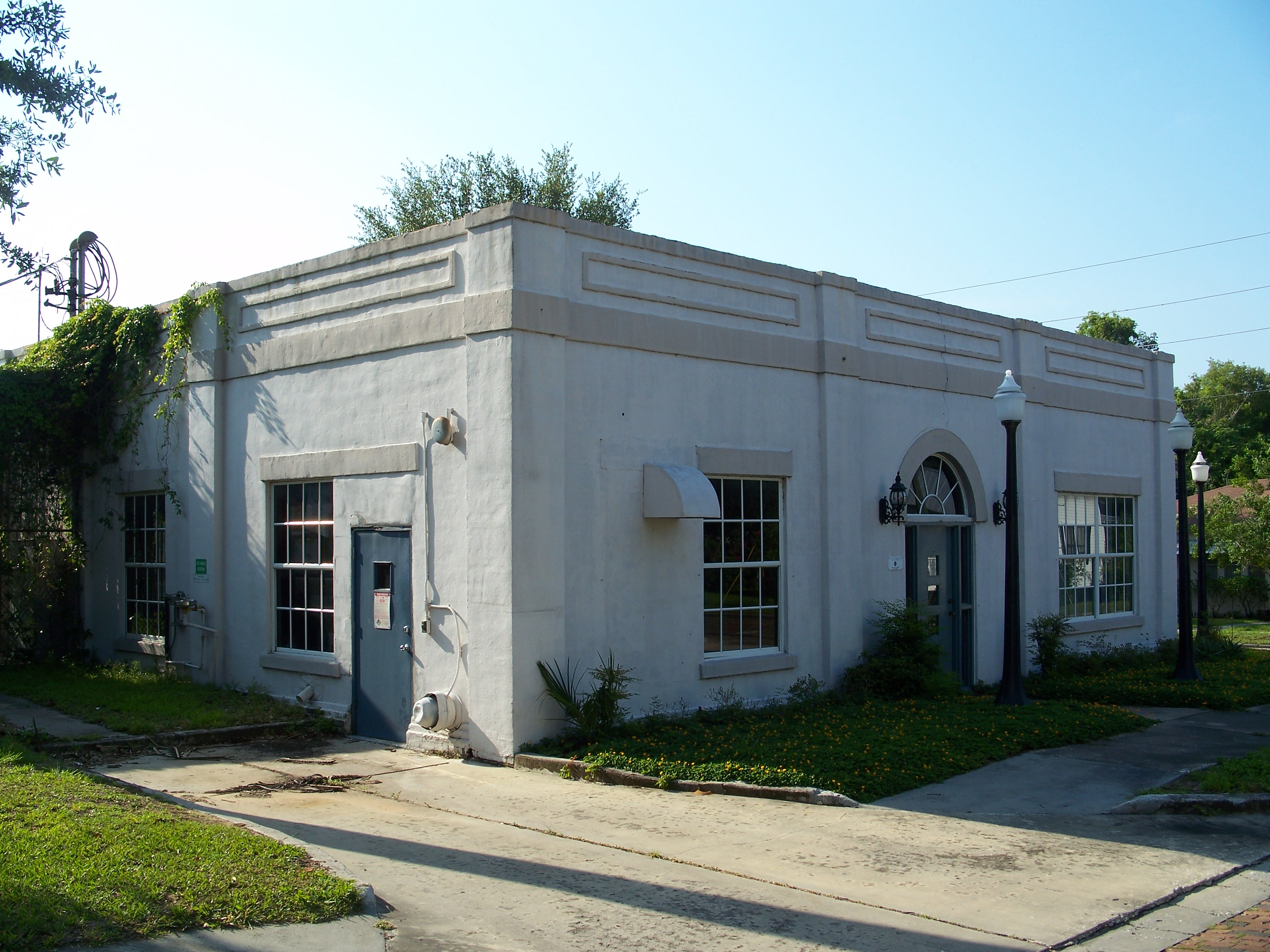
Water Works building
