= Long Lane (Southwark) =

Main road in Southwark, Greater London, United Kingdom

Coordinates: 51.4993°N 0.0860°W

A2198

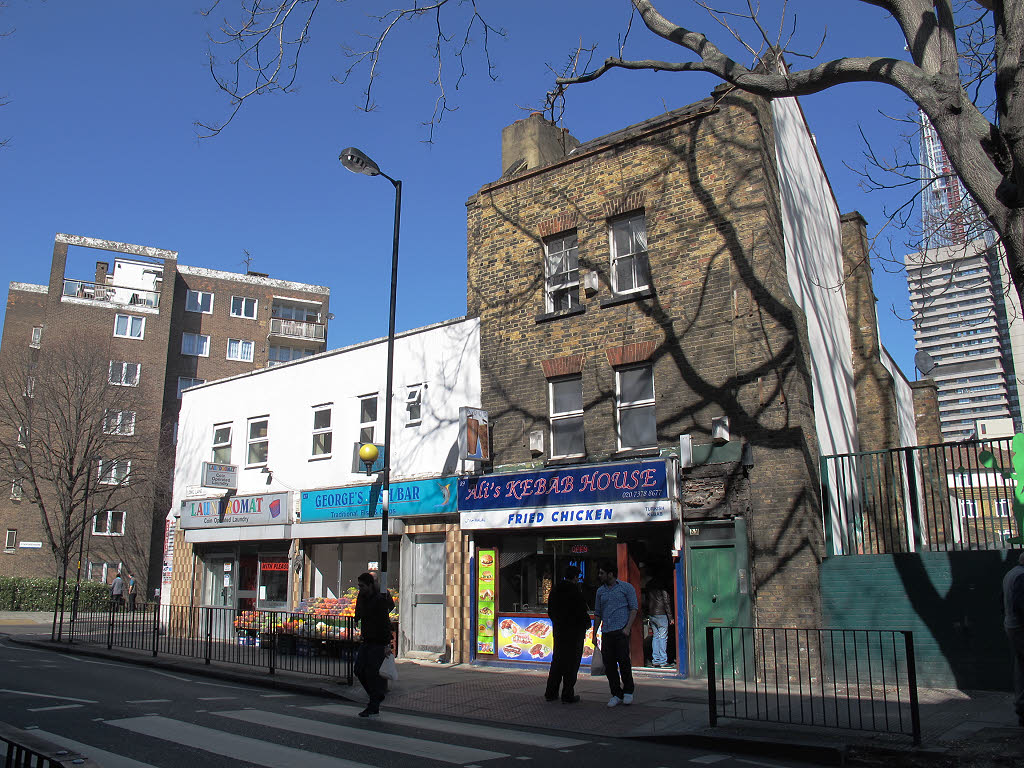
- Shops on A2198 Long Lane

Route information
- Length: 2.3 mi (3.7 km)

Major junctions
- West end: Borough
- A2 A2205 A100
- East end: Bermondsey

Location
- Country: United Kingdom
- Constituent country: England

Road network
- Roads in the United Kingdom; Motorways; A and B road zones
← A2102	→ A2199

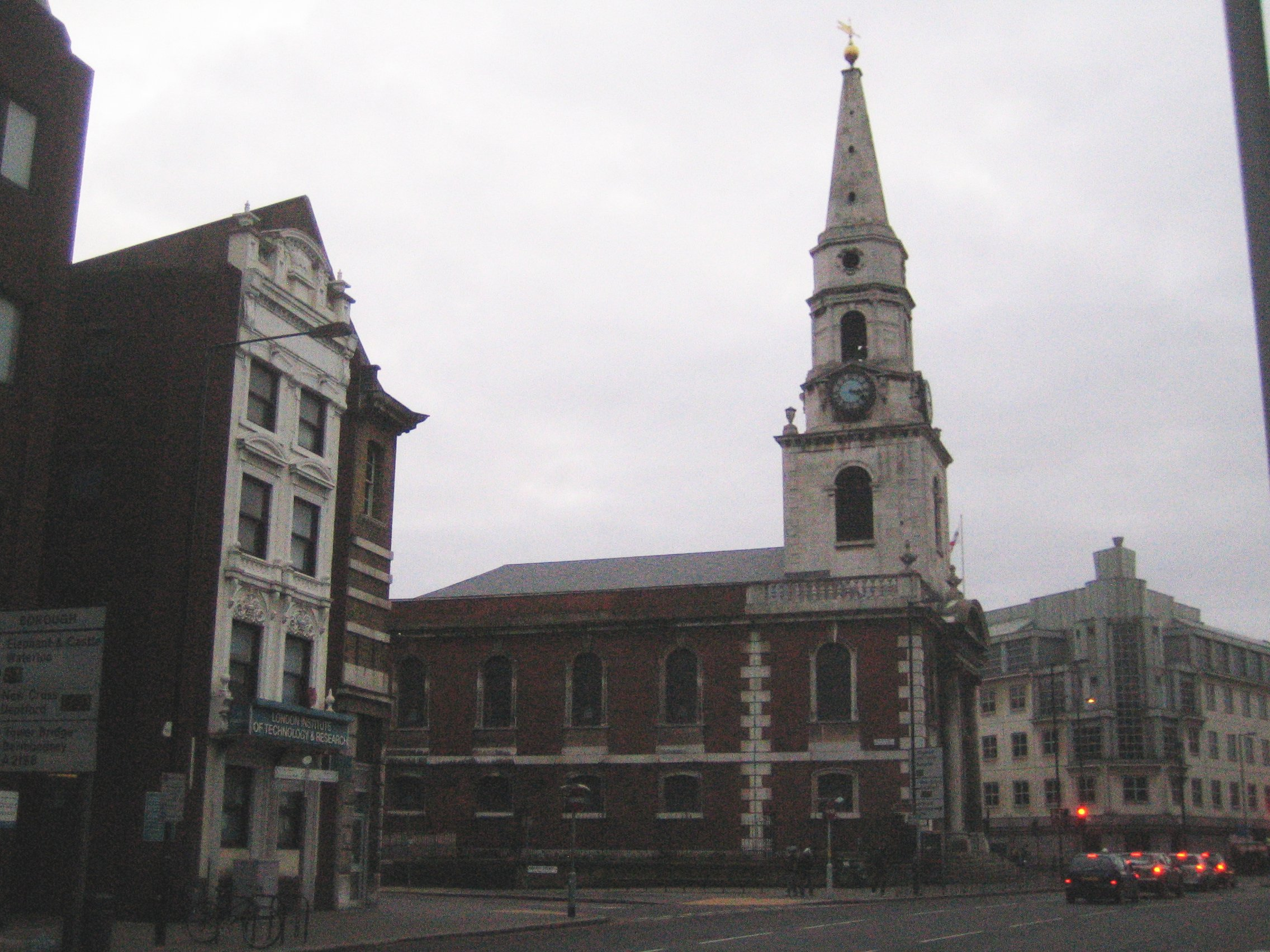
St George the Martyr church at the northwest end of Long Lane.

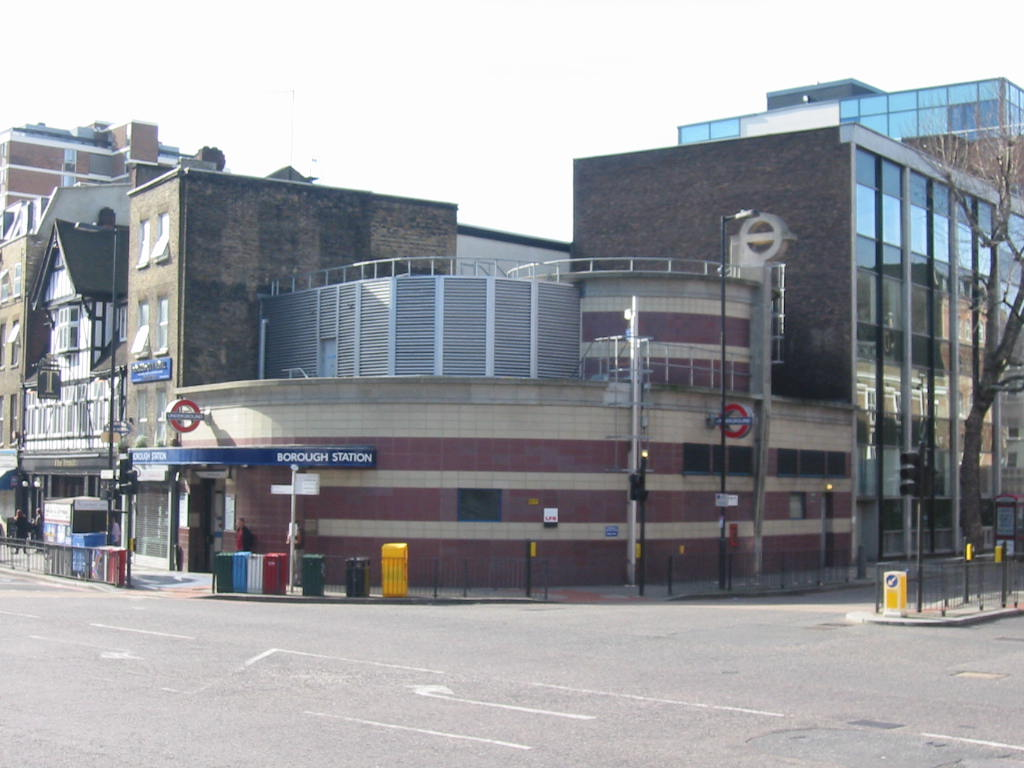
Borough Underground station opposite the northwest end of Long Lane BankSide.

Long Lane is a main east–west road in Southwark, south London, England.

== Route ==
The south side of the medieval-founded St George the Martyr church, of high classical 1730s design, adjoins the street before its western ending. East of the church is a paved, tree-studded, pedestrianised zone before park St Georges Gardens, the successor to its churchyard. This was the church where Little Dorrit (in Dickens's Little Dorrit) was baptised and married. Dickens in reality lodged one block southwest as a child in Lant Street when his father was in the Marshalsea debtors' prison during 1824. It was a traumatic period of his life. A few metres north of the lane's "London" end (so along Great Dover Street) are steps to Borough tube station.

Just before its western end, a T-junction with Great Dover Street, it has the north end of the modernised but medieval route of that street, Tabard Street, which is a Georgian renaming of the London conclusion of the Old Kent Road (its conclusion can otherwise be considered bustling Borough High Street/London Bridge beyond, all piling in the traffic to the city from Surrey and Sussex). A few metres north, Great Dover Street has its final crossroads, crossing Borough High Street to face Marshalsea Road which links to Southwark Bridge Road.

== Road numbering ==
The road is designated the A2198. At the east end, via Abbey Street is a crossroads, crossing Tower Bridge Road (the A100). Before giving over to Abbey Street most traffic is signposted to and from Bermondsey Street (the A2205) which is further east.

== History ==
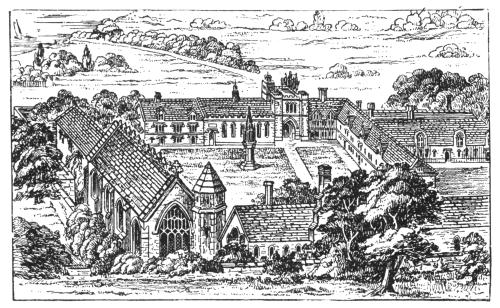
Bermondsey Abbey, which used to be at the southeast end of Long Lane.

Long Lane originally led from the site of Bermondsey Abbey to the High Street by St George's Church. It was created by the Priory/ Abbey to connect its Bermondsey landholding to that of the southern end of the High Street and to its manor on the western side of Southwark which later became known as St George's Fields sometime from 1104. The land to the north of Long Lane was called Snow Fields in the eighteenth century and a street of that name runs through the same area.

There have been archaeological excavations alongside Long Lane.

== Incidents ==
- On 9 January 2008, a 16-year-old was stabbed on a nearby street named Porlock Street. There was also a quadruple stabbing on long lane making it the most dangerous road in southwark

== See also ==
- Long Lane, City of London
