= Southwark Playhouse =

Theatre with two venues in London, England

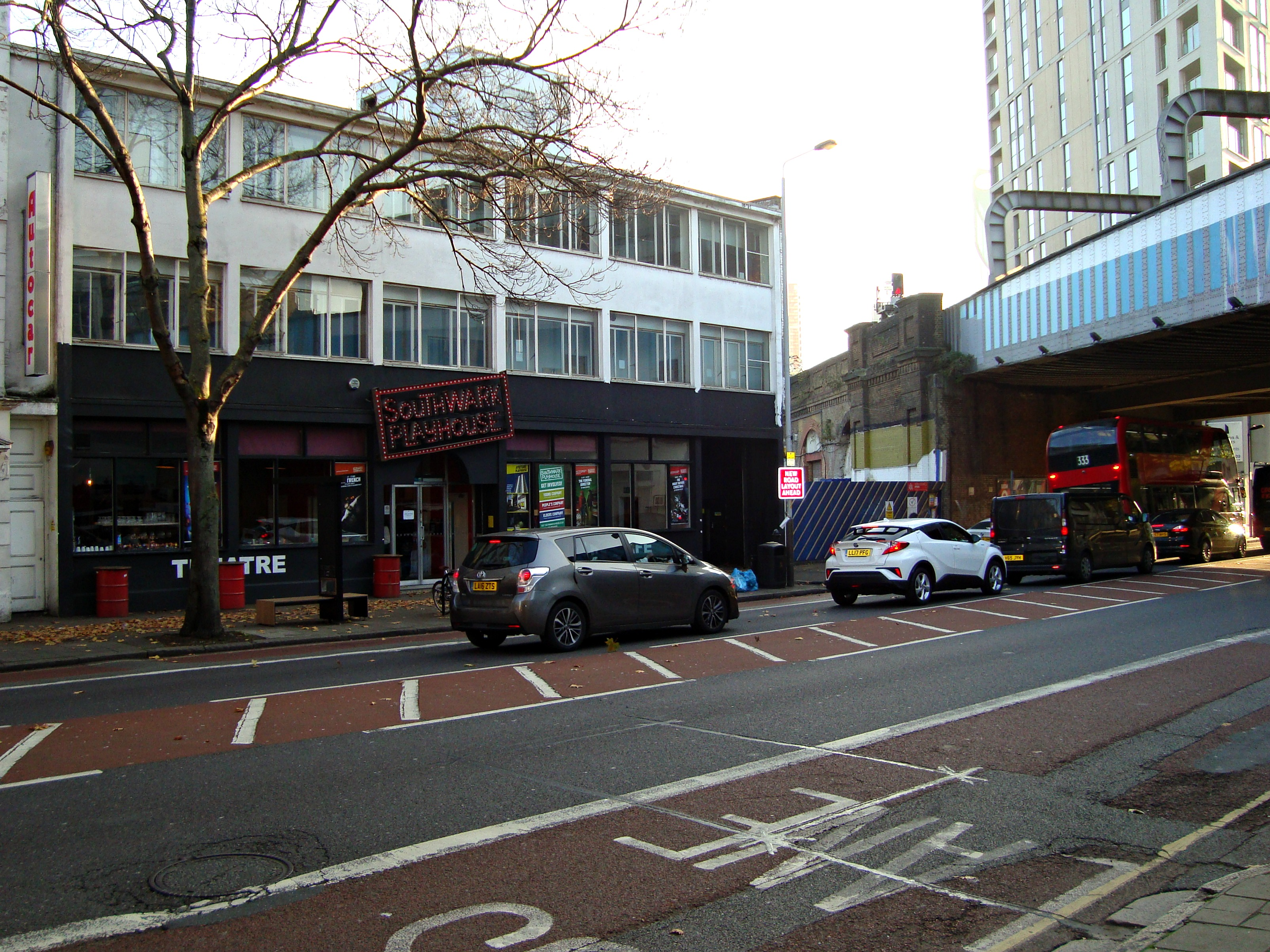
- Southwark Playhouse
- Interactive map of Southwark Playhouse
- Address: 77-85 Newington Causeway; Southwark, London, SE1 6BD; England
- Coordinates: 51.4976522°N 0.0984833°W
- Type: Off-West End Theatre
- Production: Guest productions
- Public transit: Elephant & Castle; Elephant & Castle

Construction
- Opened: 1993; 33 years ago
- Years active: 1993 - Present

Website
- southwarkplayhouse.co.uk

Southwark Playhouse is a theatre in London with two venues, both located between Borough and Elephant and Castle tube stations. Southwark Playhouse is known for both its staged productions and its community outreach.

== History ==
The Southwark Playhouse Theatre Company was founded in 1993 by Juliet Alderdice and Tom Wilson. They identified the need for a high quality accessible theatre which would also act as a major resource for the community. They leased a disused workshop in a then comparatively neglected part of Southwark and turned it into a flexible theatre space.

Over the next fifteen years the theatre established itself as one of London's leading studio theatres, presenting work by new and emerging theatre practitioners. Under successive artistic directors, Mehmet Ergen (now Artistic Director of the Arcola Theatre), Erica Whyman (subsequently Artistic Director of the Northern Stage Company and deputy Artistic Director of the Royal Shakespeare Company), Thea Sharrock and Gareth Machin (now Artistic Director of Salisbury Playhouse), it has become part of the network of small-scale fringe theatre in London. Its venue hire rates remain among the lowest and therefore the most competitive in London theatre, providing the opportunity to host the best of the emerging companies based in or visiting the capital.

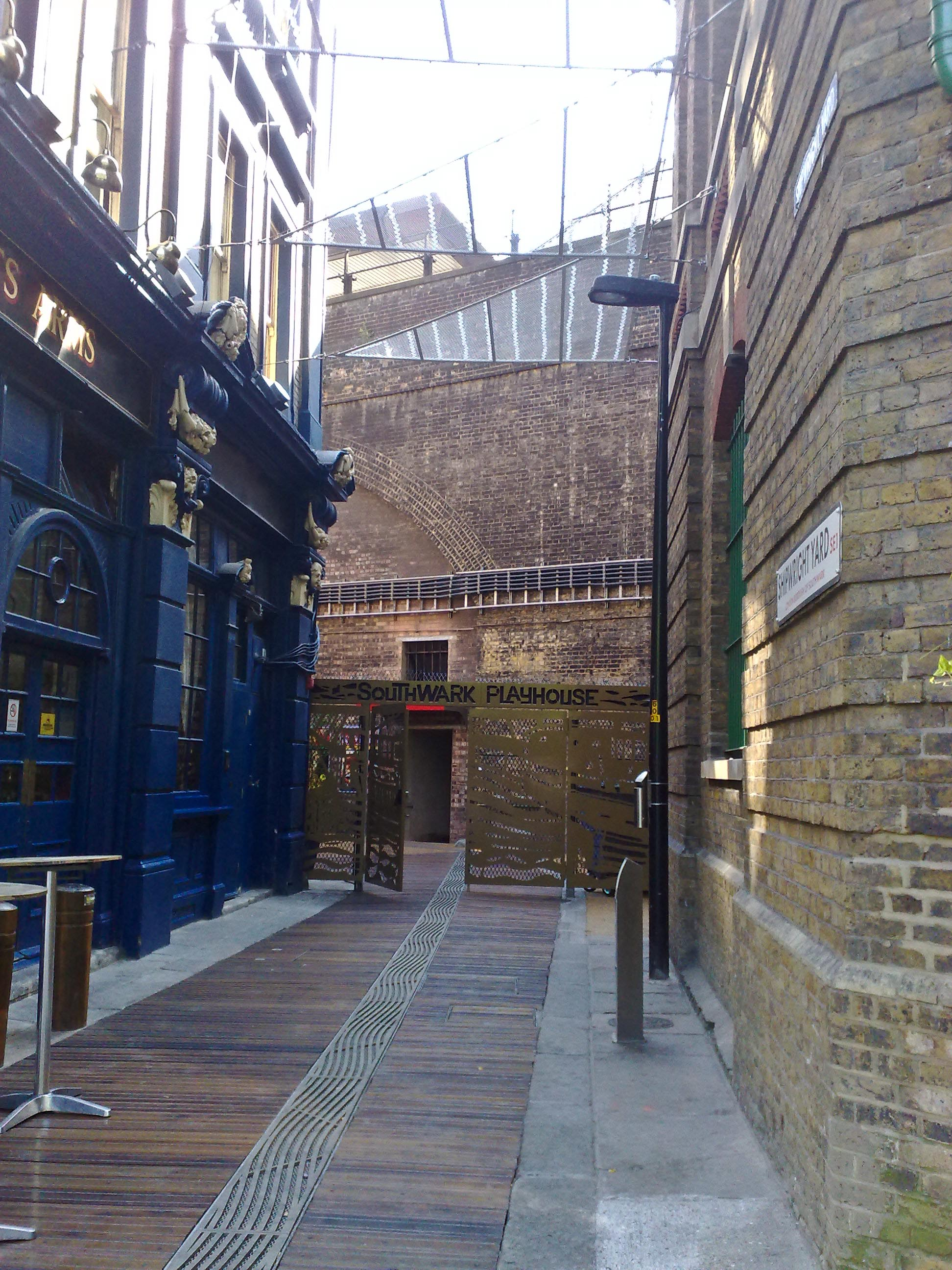
Tooley Street venue (2006-2013)

Southwark Playhouse has had four sites in its history. After leaving its original home in Southwark Bridge Road in 2006, the theatre operated in vaults beneath platform one of London Bridge railway station, accessed from Tooley Street, from 2007 until early 2013. Since early 2013 the theatre has been based at 77-85 Newington Causeway. In 2018 the theatre was awarded ₤750,000 from the London Mayor's Good Grants Program. The award helped fund the renovation of the Elephant and Castle space. The Southwark Playhouse Elephant building opened in 2023, featuring a 300-seat performance venue and a space dedicated entirely to community projects.

As of 2026 Southwark Playhouse has two venues in the Elephant & Castle area, Southwark Playhouse Borough (still based in 77-85 Newington Causeway) and Southwark Playhouse Elephant (located at Dante Place).

Since 2009, the Playhouse also offers an opportunity to develop to young people (between the age of 11 and 18) living in the areas of Southwark, Lambeth and Lewisham, coming part of YoCo, their Young People Company.

The Playhouse also has an acting group for people aged 65 and over (the Elders Company) performing short plays onstage and a People's Company for anyone aged 25 or over.

== Plans ==
In July 2012 it was announced that, due to the redevelopment of London Bridge Station, Southwark Playhouse would not be able to keep its home underneath the arches of the station. After a high-profile public campaign backed by Stephen Fry and Andy Serkis, a space was secured in the new station complex as part of a Section 106 agreement with Network Rail which would allow the theatre to return to its London Bridge premises.

Since 2013 Southwark Playhouse has had a base at 77-85 Newington Causeway, in a 3-floor warehouse between Borough and Elephant and Castle tube stations. The temporary theatre, opened in May 2013, houses two performance spaces: a 240-seat main house known as the large and a 120-seat studio, 'the little'. There is also a rehearsal space and a bar/cafe area.

The original plan for the theatre was to return to its Tooley Street location once the London Bridge redevelopment was completed in 2018. As of October 2026 this has not happened and the temporary home on Newington Causeway remains, but a new permanent 300-seat venue on Newington Butts opened in January 2023.

== Productions ==
Notable shows through its history are:

- Tender Napalm (2011) - play by Philip Ridley, the production then toured.
- In the Heights (2014) – then transferred to the King's Cross Theatre (2015)
- The Curious Case of Benjamin Button (musical) (2019, 2023) – transferred to the Ambassadors Theatre (2024/25)
