= Union Street, London =

Street in the London Borough of Southwark

Coordinates: 51°30′13″N 0°5′53″W

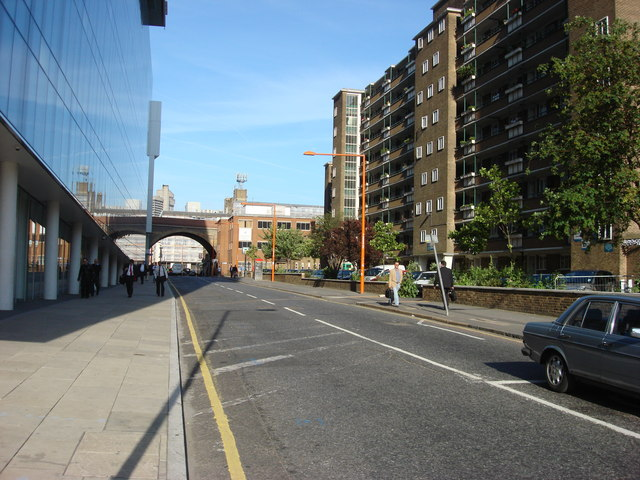
Union Street.

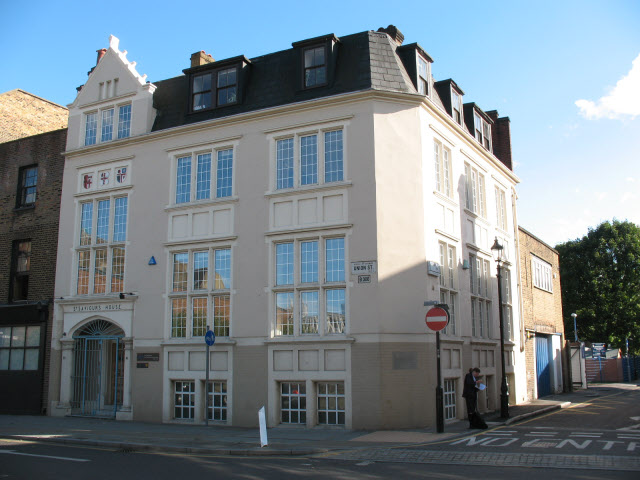
St Saviour's House

Union Street is a major street in the London Borough of Southwark. It runs between Blackfriars Road to the west and Borough High Street to the east. Southwark Bridge Road crosses in the middle.

== History ==
The eastern part of the street was laid out under a 1774 Act passed for making a new workhouse and for "making a carriage way from the … High Street, through the Greyhound Inn, into Queen Street, and for improving the passage from thence into Gravel Lane, leading towards the Black Friars Bridge Road, in the parish of Christ Church."

In 1782 the Union Hall was opened as the Surrey Magistrates Court in the borough, the JPs having previously sat at the Town Hall in the High Street. The façade of the Hall was retained on the new structure on the site in 2005.

In 1813, Queen Street and Duke Street were renamed Union Street. In 1908 Charlotte Street, at the western end of Union Street, was also renamed to be part of the street yet it clearly has a dislocated junction with it, exacerbated by it starting under the railway viaduct.

A fire at an oil and paint shop in Union Street in April 1885 resulted in the death of Alice Ayres, whose bravery in saving her three nieces captured the public imagination.

Red Cross Burial Ground was a burial ground at the northeast corner of Union Street and Red Cross Way.

The street was called Union Street because it marks the boundary between the two local parishes in the area.

== Amenities ==
The Union Theatre is a leading fringe venue on the north side of the street. On the south side is Jerwood Space, an arts venue, located in the former Orange Street School. Other art galleries include the RKB Gallery, dedicated to artworks on paper, and the Union Gallery, a contemporary art gallery under the railway arches on the north side, that moved to Teesdale Road in February 2009.

Public houses on the street include the Charles Dickens and the Lord Nelson, named after two famous Englishmen. Dickens lodged in Lant Street not far away as a child.

== Transport ==
Southwark Underground station is at the western end. Southwark Street runs in parallel to the north. The road forms part of the B300, linking with The Cut to the west. To the east is Newcomen Street.
