= Little Dorrit's Playground =

Playground in London, England

Coordinates: 51°30′08″N 0°05′37″W

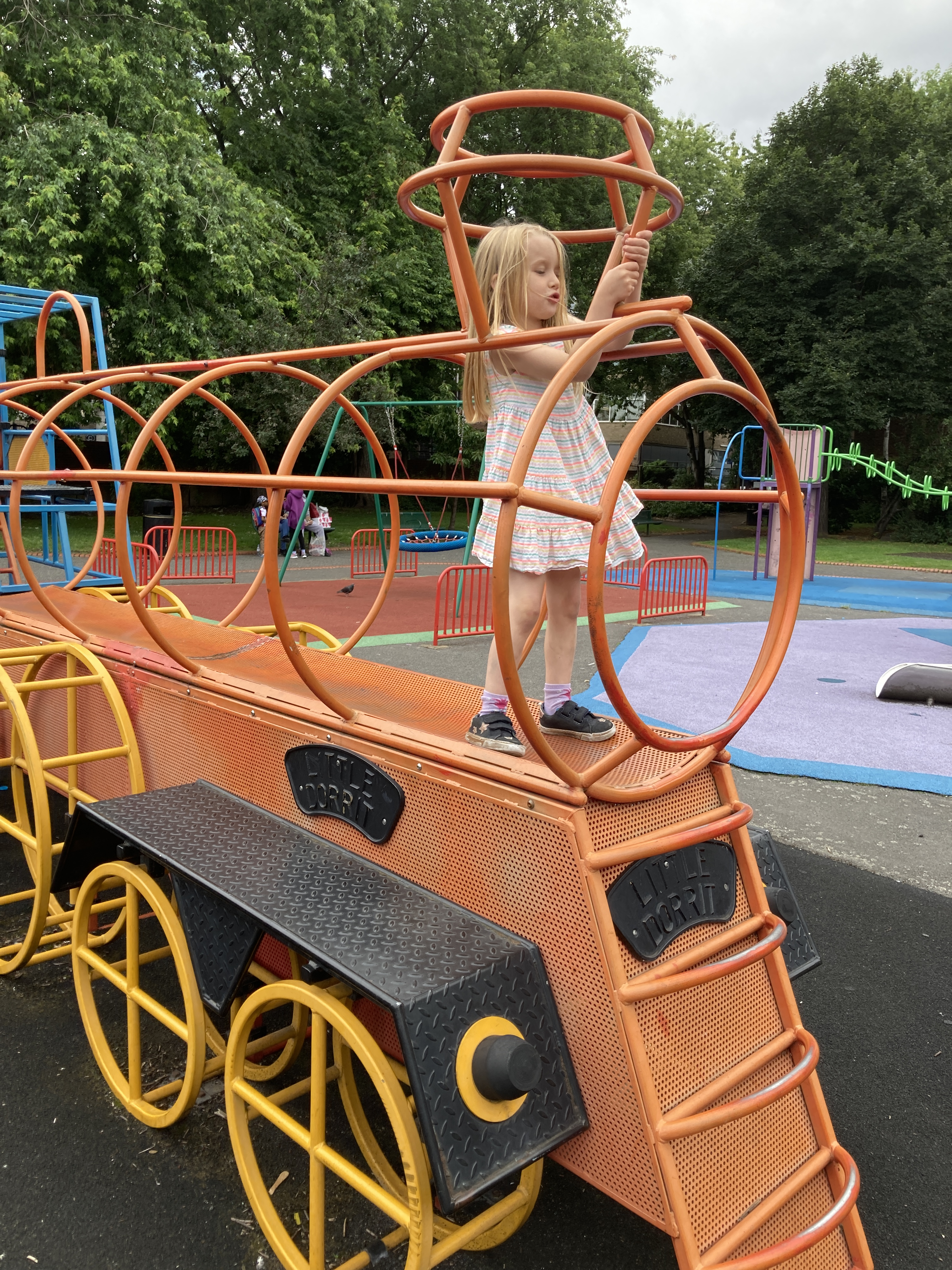
A child on playground equipment in the park

Little Dorrit's Playground, named after Little Dorrit, the eponymous Charles Dickens character, is a public playground and small park just north of Marshalsea Road in Southwark, south London, England.

== History ==
The site was previously called Falcon Court, "a horrible rookery of tumble-down, dirty hovels." In 1902, a small public open space called Little Dorrit's Playground was opened north of Marshalsea Road. The surrounding area has many Dickensian associations. Charles Dickens himself had lodgings in Lant Street to the south of Marsalsea Road as a child when his father is in the Marshalsea debtors' prison nearby in 1824. This had a profound effect on the young Dickens and his later novel Little Dorrit is based around the area and the prison. The character Little Dorrit was baptised and married in the local church, St George the Martyr, at the southeast end of Marshalsea Road close to the playground.

Much of the area became derelict as a result of air raid damage during World War II. In 2001, the playground was improved through the effort of the Little Dorrit Park Group, set up by mothers in the area. The playground is supported by the Bankside Open Spaces Trust (BOST).

North of Marshalsea Road, Little Dorrit's Court, also named after the Dickens character, can be found as well.
