= Borough High Street =

Road in Southwark, London, England

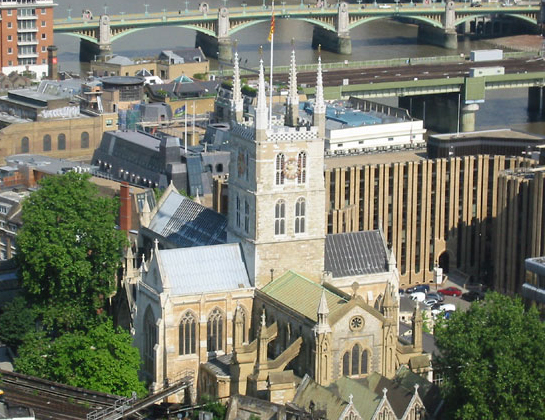
- Southwark Cathedral at the north end of Borough High Street
- Interactive map of Borough High Street
- Former name(s): The Borough; St. Margaret's Hill; Blackman Street; Longe Southwark; Wellington Street
- Length: 0.8 mi (1.3 km)
- Postal code: SE1
- northeast end: London Bridge; 51.5081°N 0.0876°W
- southwest end: Newington Causeway; 51.4991°N 0.0970°W

Borough High Street is a road in Southwark, London, running south-west from London Bridge, forming part of the A3 route which runs from London to Portsmouth, on the south coast of England.

== Overview ==
Borough High Street continues southwest as Newington Causeway, here co-inciding with ancient Stane Street, the Roman road between London and Chichester. Another important connection is with the Dover Road (the modern A2 route) which diverges in a south-east direction from Borough High Street at a junction of five roads adjacent to Borough Underground station as Great Dover Street. The Dover Road mostly follows the alignment of Roman Watling Street, though, here, the original Roman route was along Tabard Street closely parallel with Great Dover Street to the north.

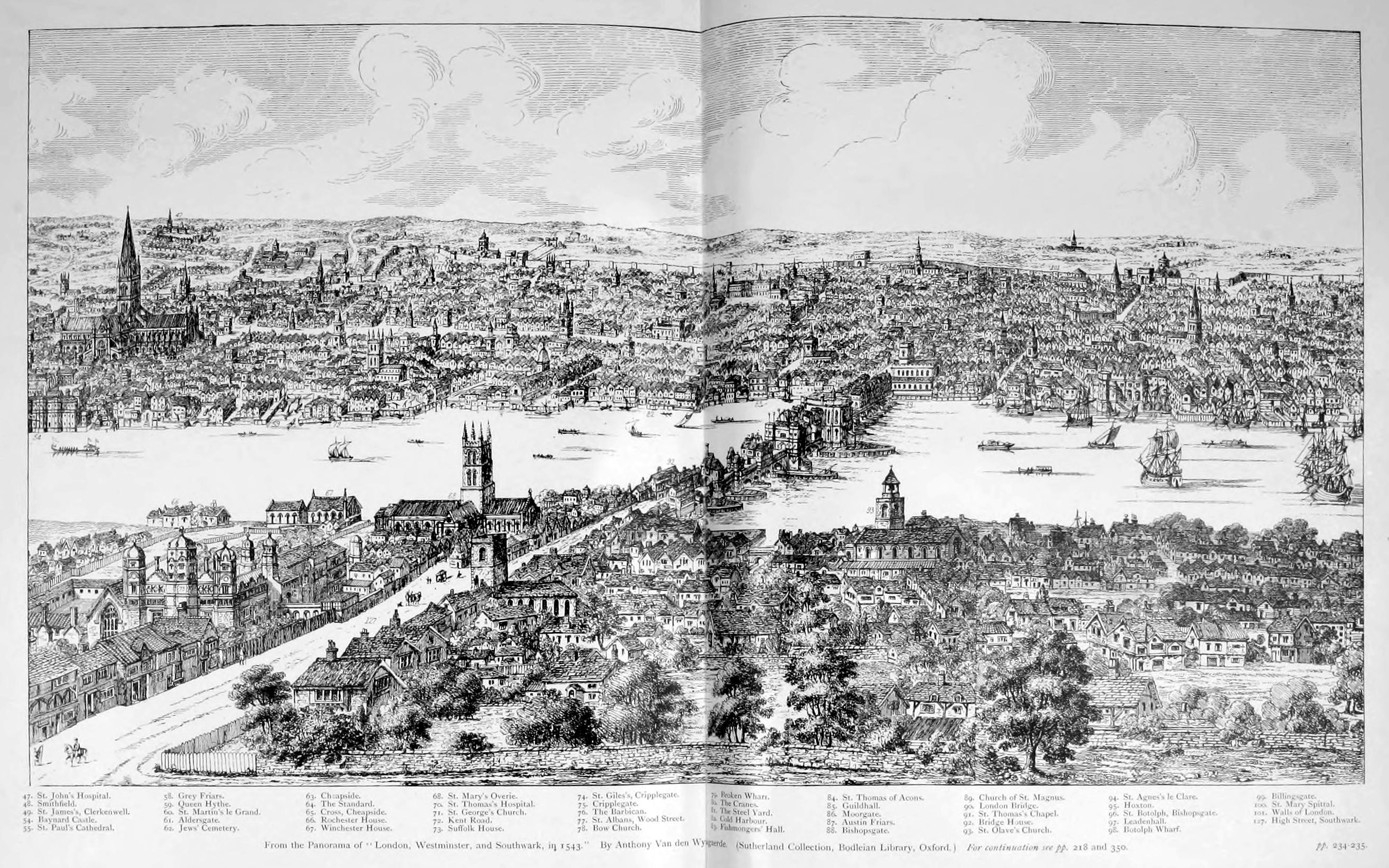
Part of Panorama of London by Anton van den Wyngaerde, c1555, with Borough High Street leading past Southwark Cathedral to Old London Bridge, with Old St. Paul's Cathedral top l.

The stretch of Borough High Street south of the junction with Long Lane, Marshalsea Road, and Tabard Street, where stands the ancient church of St. George the Martyr, was formerly called Blackman Street after a long resident family there.

Borough Market was once held on the street, but has been moved to the west with its main entrance on Southwark Street. Southwark Cathedral, prominent on the west side of the street near London Bridge, can be reached by a small pedestrian bridge and stairs, though its postal address is actually Montague Close.

The earliest recorded name for the street is simply 'The Borough' which was the part between the fork of the street and London Bridge. South of the fork it was called 'St. Margaret's Hill'. These names were subsumed in the Tudor period as 'Longe Southwark' (differentiated from 'Short Southwark' now Tooley Street) and by the late Georgian era as simply 'High Street' and the northern section from the junction with Duke Street Hill was renamed 'Wellington Street' to commemorate the Duke of Wellington. From the 1890s the London County Council started to rationalise all metropolitan street names and 'Borough High Street' became the name for the current route.

== History ==
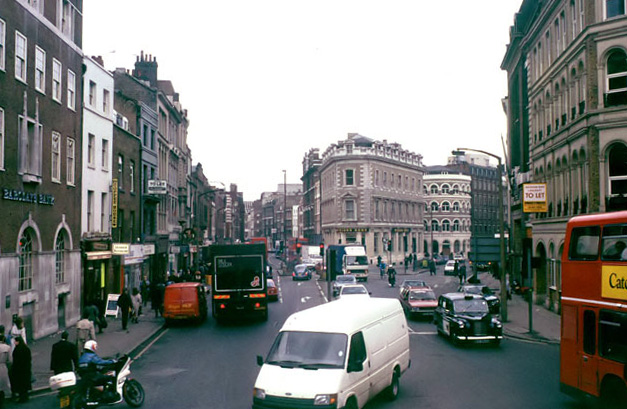
Borough High Street in 1989.

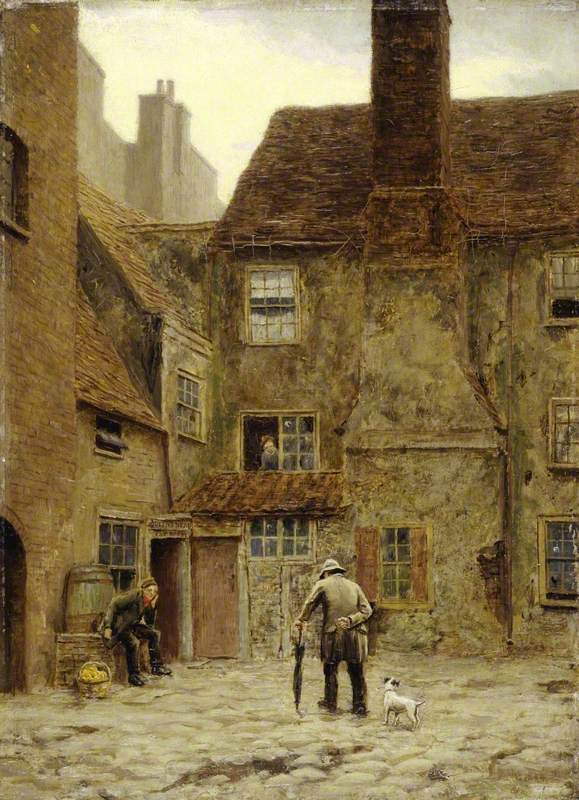
The Backyard of the Queen's Head Inn 105 Borough High Street Southwark (1883) by Philip Norman

Before the building of Westminster Bridge, Borough High Street was the only connection from the south bank of the Thames to London, which lay on the north bank. As a major communications node for traffic between London and Portsmouth, Dover, south-east England generally and also travellers from Europe, Borough High Street had many coaching inns. These were of considerable size, with courtyard and surrounding multi-tier galleries. There were twenty-three in total, including the Bear, the Queen's Head, the King's Head, the Catherine Wheel, the Tabard, the White Hart, and the George. Many of them dated back originally to the mediæval period, and were in use as coaching inns up to the mid-nineteenth century, when this mode of transport was superseded by the railway. These inns were very famous and receive mention in the work of such literary giants as Chaucer, Shakespeare and Charles Dickens, though are now all gone - apart from the George.

On the west side of the street, the modern office block called Brandon House at 180 Borough High Street (opposite Borough Underground station) marks the site of a mansion called Suffolk Place, demolished in 1557. It is depicted by Anthony van den Wyngaerde's sixteenth century Panorama of London, which features Borough High Street prominently in the foreground of the picture. After demolition the site of the mansion and the area to the west of Borough High Street here became notorious as the criminal enclave of The Mint.

The Marshalsea and King's Bench Prisons were also located on Borough High Street on the east side between Newcomen Street and Tabard Street.

=== Street numbering ===
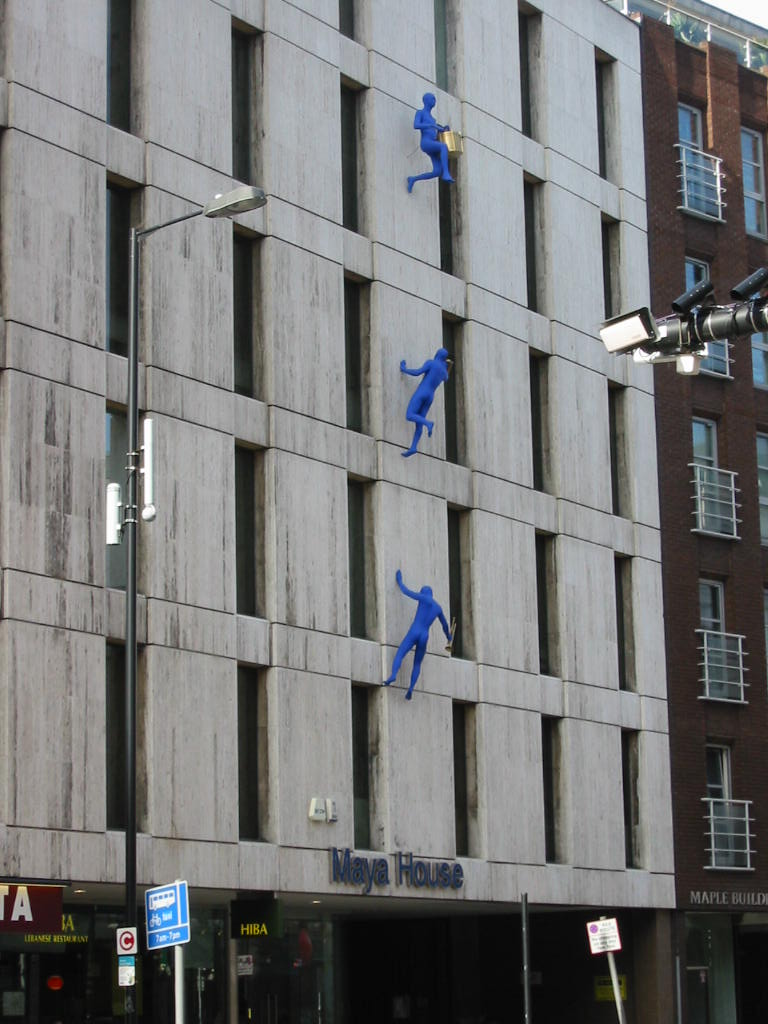
Blue Men by Ofra Zimbalista climbing Maya House on Borough High Street (2007).

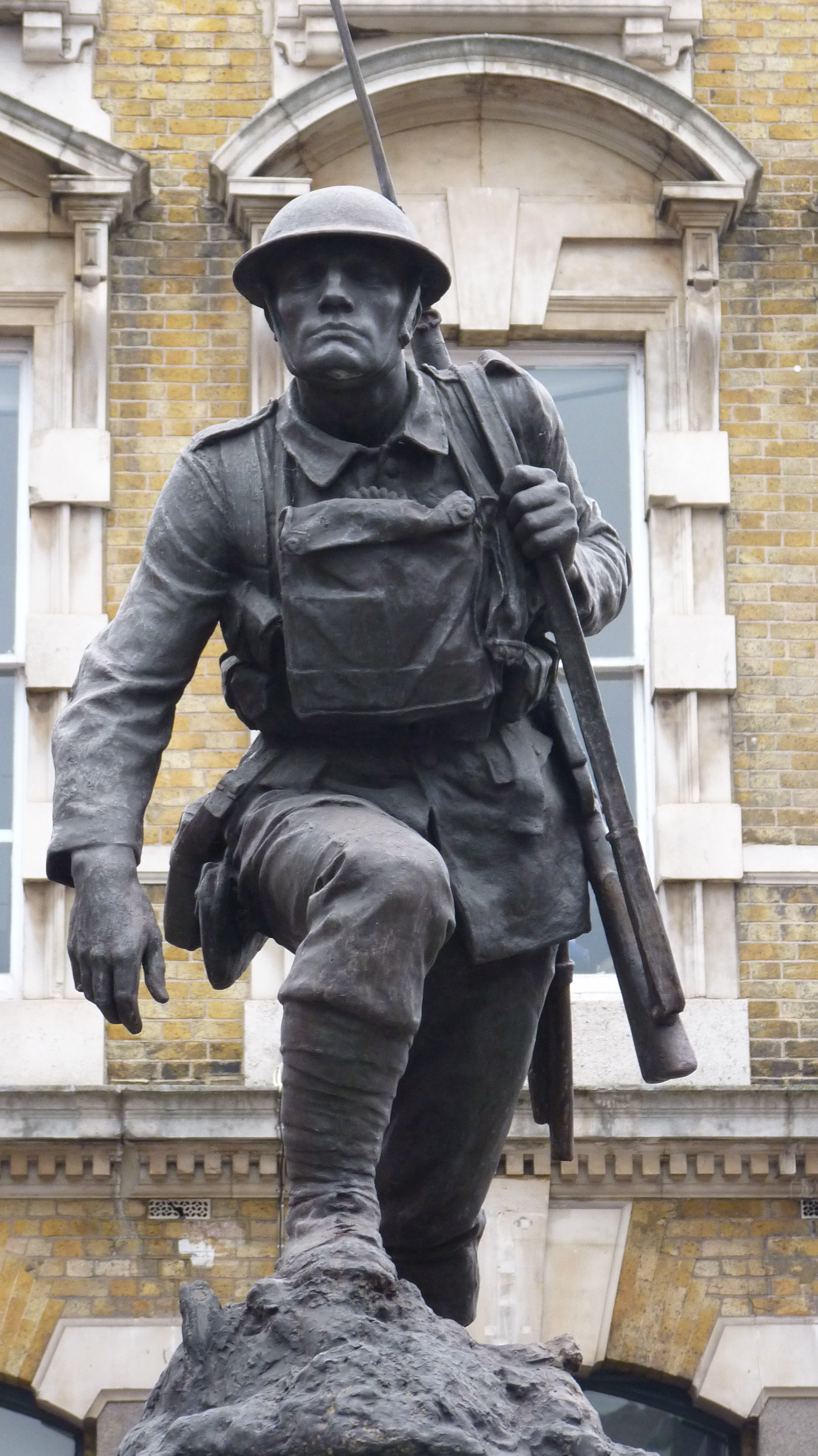
War Memorial statue

The present numbering of the buildings on the street is confusing because of piecemeal alteration over the past 150 years:- The street was widened and realigned to the west in the 1820s for the Rennie London Bridge. The 'fork' at the junction with Southwark Street was created when that street was inserted, in 1864, to connect the London Bridge, Southwark Bridge, and Blackfriars Bridge routes together. This new route cut across Stoney Street and isolated its southern end, which section was subsequently renumbered as part of Borough High Street although it actually lies behind numbers 28–32 to their west-side. The small alleyway connecting the two branches of the 'fork' is named 'Counter Court' (see Borough Compter) but is not an address for any premises.

The railway viaduct across the street was also erected in 1864 and this cut across a quadrant of both the main streets. This led to the numbering on the west-side of the street ceasing at the junction with Bedale Street, at which the Southwark Street numbers begin as number '6'. However, these appear continuous with Borough High Street which only becomes apparent at the junction with Stoney Street further along to the west. Between Bedale Street and No 28 there is no 'west-side' of the High Street as this is Southwark Street 'west-side'. The High Street's numbers continue at No 28, the HSBC Bank branch, which also seems to be on the south-side of Southwark Street, but that street's south-side numbers do not start until after the junction with the 'fork' going west. On the approach to the Bridge, Borough High Street northeast-side numbering starts at No 7 which is a vault shop within the railway viaduct, the lower numbers' disappearance was caused by the 1990s developments on the river side north of Duke Street Hill, the main office block north of this is actually 'No 1 London Bridge' and the pedestrian only 'London Bridge Walk' leading to Colechurch House and the mainline Station concourse.

To compound the eccentric numbering, the building that appears first at the northwest side of Borough High Street (Hibernia Chambers/Glaziers Hall No 9 Montague Close at its ground floor) had its first floor level connected to the Bridge level pavement in 2000 and was given the address 'No 2 London Bridge'. On the northwest side, the street numbers of the High Street start after the small bridge crossing over Tooley Street as No 4 Borough High Street 'Bridge House'.

With the extension of the railway viaduct in 2010 the buildings between it and the junction with Bedale Street an attempt was made to simplify the numbering system. The Victorian buildings were replaced in 2013 but this is a glazed 'foyer' facility of Borough Market and is not actually numbered as premises but the section which is a store has been provided with the number '16' which means that the foyer could be numbered 18 and 20. This means the numbering is now 4, 6 - 8, 10 actually accessed as a side stairway of 6-8 (gap stairs down to Cathedral and Borough Market) 14 (vault unit within the viaduct) 16 and (Southwark Street junction) 28.

Continuing along the 'east side' of the 'fork' along the main part of the street is numbered 30, 32, 34. Then returning to the 'west side' of the 'fork', is numbered 36 (this is north of 34 and adjacent to 28) continuing south as 38 to 42. The building immediately next to 28 (i.e. south of Counter Court), north of the side door of 34, opposite 36 and behind 30 (to its east) is numbered '1b Southwark Street', presumably the side door of 28 is taken as '1 Southwark Street' although not numbered as such; it is therefore actually in the High Street. Southwark Street continues properly at the junction with the 'west side' of the 'fork' as No 3 Southwark Street, but this number appears on its side door situated next to 36 and so is also in the west fork of the High Street.

== Amenities and features ==
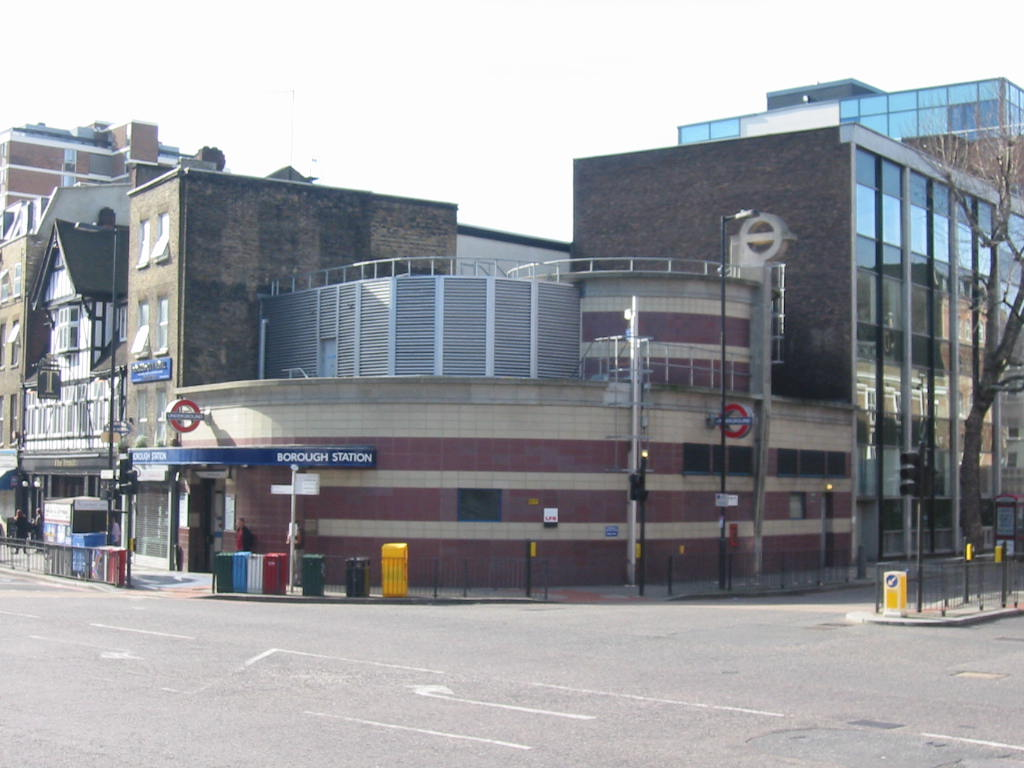
Borough Underground station.

Borough is a cosmopolitan area of London, with many restaurants, bars and Borough Market. The street also has many cafés and food shops including Sainsbury's Local. Public Houses include: North to south -

- The Barrowboy and Banker (previously a NatWest Bank branch)
- The George Inn
- The Bridge Ta (previously a Slug and Lettuce and occupying the Town Hall Chambers building which was previous to 1989 a NatWest Bank branch)
- St Christopher's Inn
- Belushi's
- The Roxy Bar & Screen
- The Blue Eyed Maid
- The Trinity
- The Ship

The Post Office (dated 1913) opposite Borough tube station closed in 2008. The main Post Office at the northern end of the street originated as the Women's Ward of the 1852 development of St Thomas's Hospital. When London Bridge Station services were extended by a viaduct to Charing Cross Station in 1868 the Hospital relocated and was partly demolished. This building remains as having been used as a goods office for the railway company.

=== David Bomberg House ===
David Bomberg House is a hall of residence at 282–302 Borough High Street for London South Bank University students. The building comprises 289 single en-suite bedrooms, divided into five blocks. It is close to the Borough Underground station and the main campus of London South Bank University on Borough Road north of Elephant and Castle.

The building is named after the English painter David Bomberg (1890–1957), who was a teacher at London South Bank University when it was known as Borough Polytechnic. He was the leading artist of the Borough Group during the 1940s and 1950s. A portrait of him hangs in the reception area. David Bomberg is considered to be London South Bank University's most famous teacher. In 2009, it was announced that the University had received a gift of a collection of works by Bomberg.

In 2009, a late night licence was granted for premises on the ground floor (Costcutter), despite a significant number of objections from residents. In February 2011, the Chaze bar and restaurant on the ground floor of the building in the former Costcutter space, opposite Southwark Police Station, obtained planning permission after a four-month deferral, despite opposition by the building's owner, London South Bank University.

== Adjoining roads ==
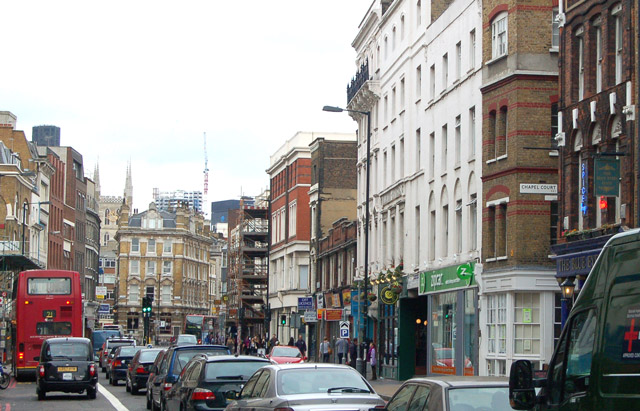
Looking north along Borough High Street

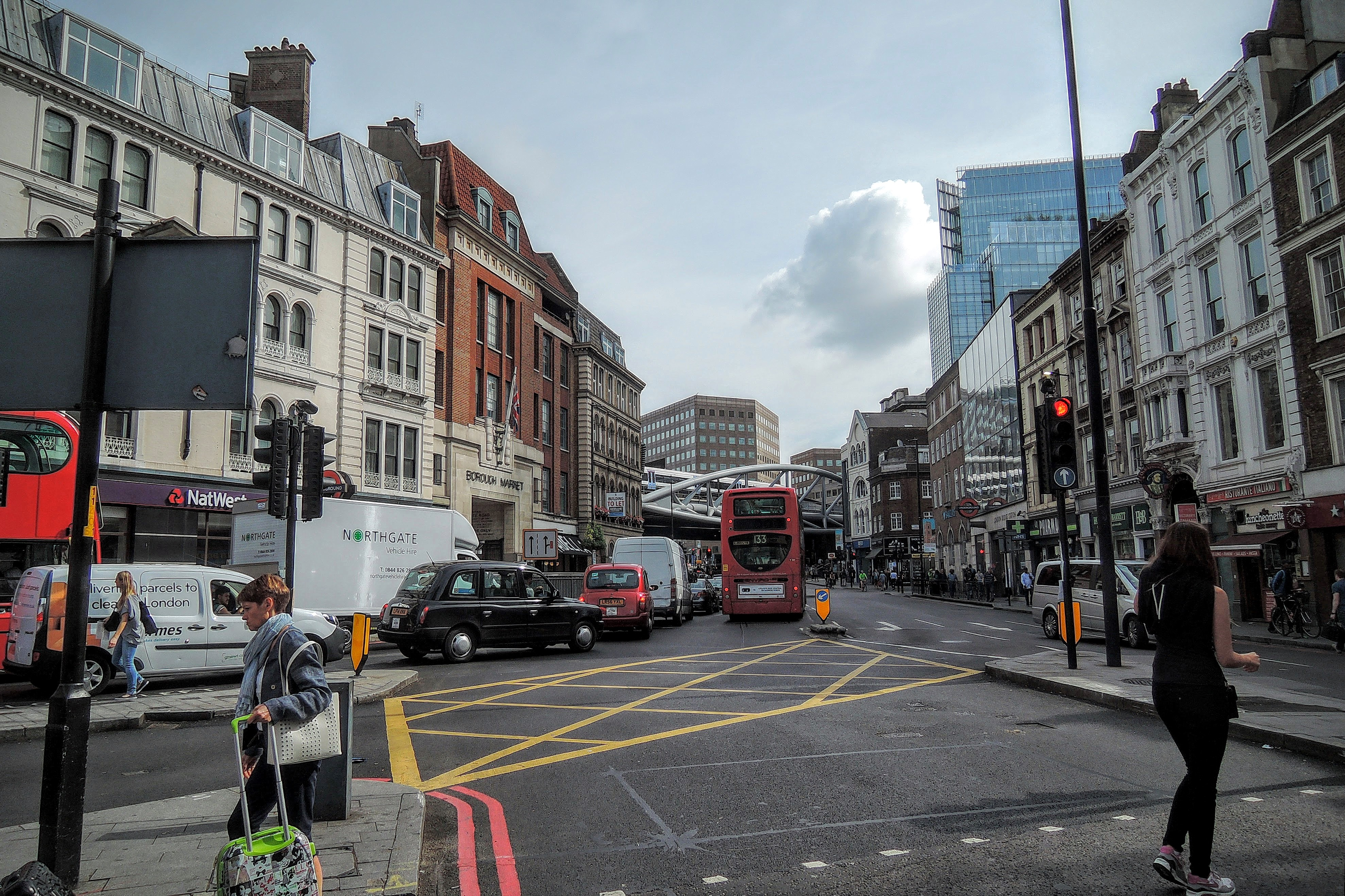
Borough High Street in 2016

From South to North on east-side:

- Newington Causeway
- Harper Road
- King's Place
- Trinity Street
- Hulme Place
- Avon Place
- Great Dover Street
- Long Lane
- Tabard Street
- Angel Place
- Layton's Buildings
- Chapel Court
- Mermaid Court
- Newcomen Street
- Kentish Buildings
- Queen's Head Yard
- Talbot Yard
- George Inn Yard
- White Hart Yard
- King's Head Yard
- St Thomas Street
- London Bridge Street
- Guildable Manor Street
- Railway Approach
- Duke Street Hill
- Tooley Street
- London Bridge

From North to South on west-side:-

- Montague Close
- Green Dragon Court
- Bedale Street
- Stoney Street
- Southwark Street
- Counter Court
- Calvert's Buildings
- St Margaret's Court
- Maidstone Buildings
- * Union Street
- Little Dorrit Court
- Marshalsea Road
- Lant Street
- Great Suffolk Street
- Borough Road

== Transport connections ==
- London Bridge Station entrance and ticket hall of Jubilee line
- Borough Underground station
- Quietway 1 cycle route crosses Borough High Street on Great Suffolk Street/Trinity Street.
