= Suffolk Place =

Mansion house in Southwark, London, England

Coordinates: 51°30′5.5″N 0°5′36″W

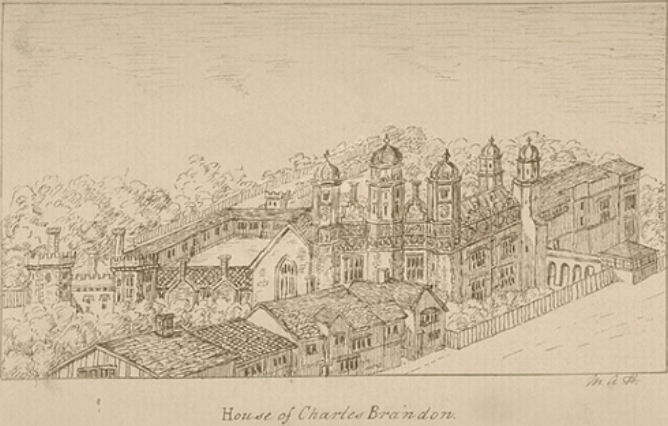
Suffolk House, drawing dated 1546 by Anton van den Wyngaerde (1525-1571)

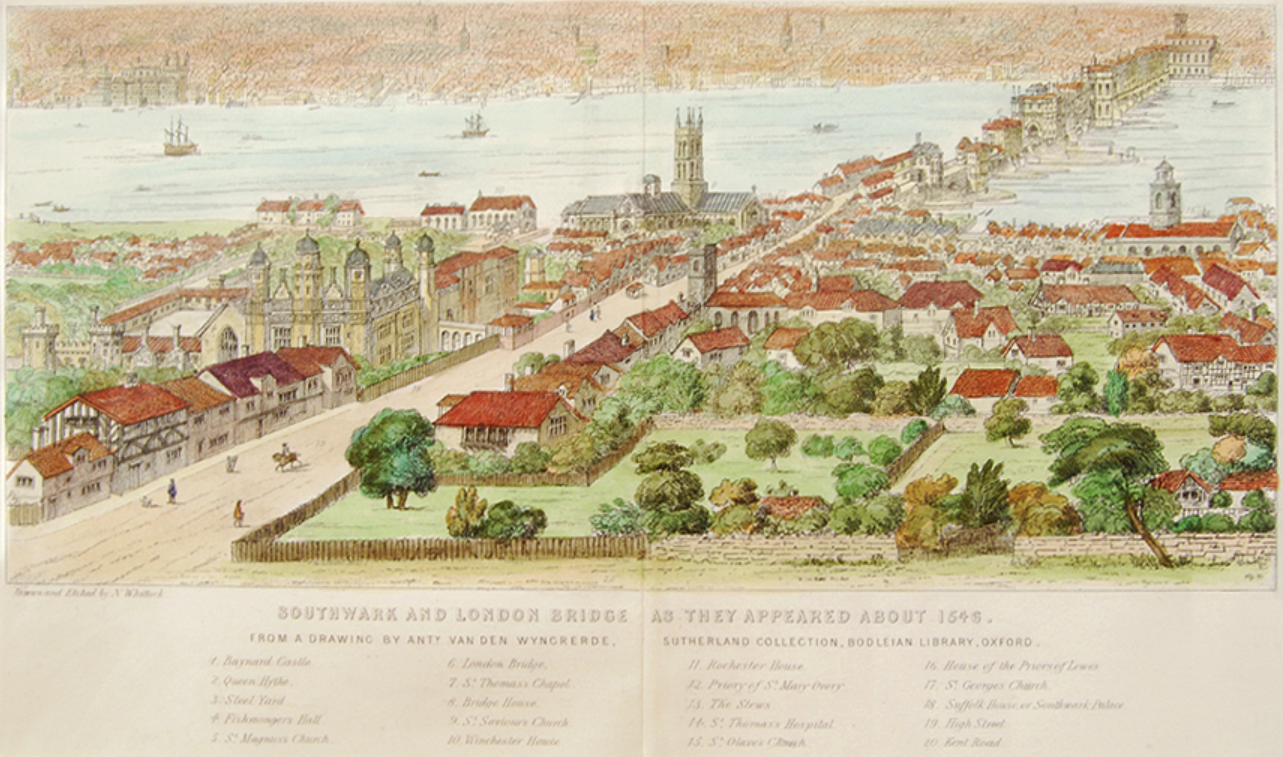
Southwark, bird's eye panorama, 19th century engraving after an original drawing dated 1546 by Anton van den Wyngaerde (1525-1571). The large mansion house on the west side of Southwark High Street is Suffolk House

Suffolk Place (or Suffolk House) was a mansion house located on the west side of Borough High Street in Southwark, Surrey, on the south bank of the River Thames opposite the City of London. It was the London town house of the Dukes of Suffolk, and was located near Winchester Palace, London seat of the Bishop of Winchester. The position was highly prominent as Borough High Street (or Southwark Street) was the principal thoroughfare leading from London Bridge and the City of London, to Canterbury and Dover, a route used by monarchs and others, including the pilgrims in Chaucer's Canterbury Tales. It was built in the fifteenth century and rebuilt in fine Renaissance style in 1522 by Charles Brandon, 1st Duke of Suffolk (c.1484-1545) a favourite of King Henry VIII. On 4 February 1536 it was taken over by King Henry VIII who exchanged it with Brandon for Norwich Place on the Strand, on the north side of the Thames, nearer to the Palace of Westminster.

King Henry VIII granted it to his wife Jane Seymour in June 1537, but when she died the following October, it reverted to the King. In 1545 the house was converted into a mint. It was occupied by Queen Mary I (1553-1558) and her new husband Philip II of Spain on the night before their state entry into London in 1554. This was possibly the time when it was depicted by Anthony van den Wyngaerde in his Panorama of London, to the left of Borough High Street in the foreground of the picture. It was demolished in 1557 and the area was built over with small tenements, which became known as The Mint, a notorious rookery. A modern office block called Brandon House at 180 Borough High Street (opposite Borough tube station) now occupies the site of Suffolk Place. It is also memorialised by nearby Suffolk Street.
