= Great Dover Street =

Street in Southwark, London

Coordinates: 51°29′52″N 0°05′25″W

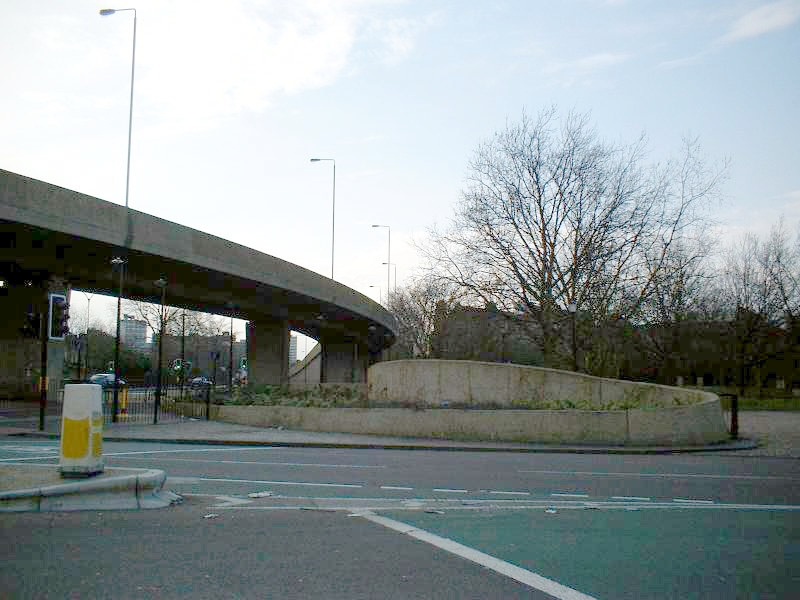
Bricklayers' Arms roundabout and flyover.

Great Dover Street is a road in Southwark, south London, England. At the northwest end it joins Marshalsea Road and Borough High Street and there is a junction with Long Lane; Borough Underground station is at this location. At the southeast end is the Bricklayers Arms roundabout and flyover. The road is part of the A2 and this continues south-east as the Old Kent Road.

== History ==
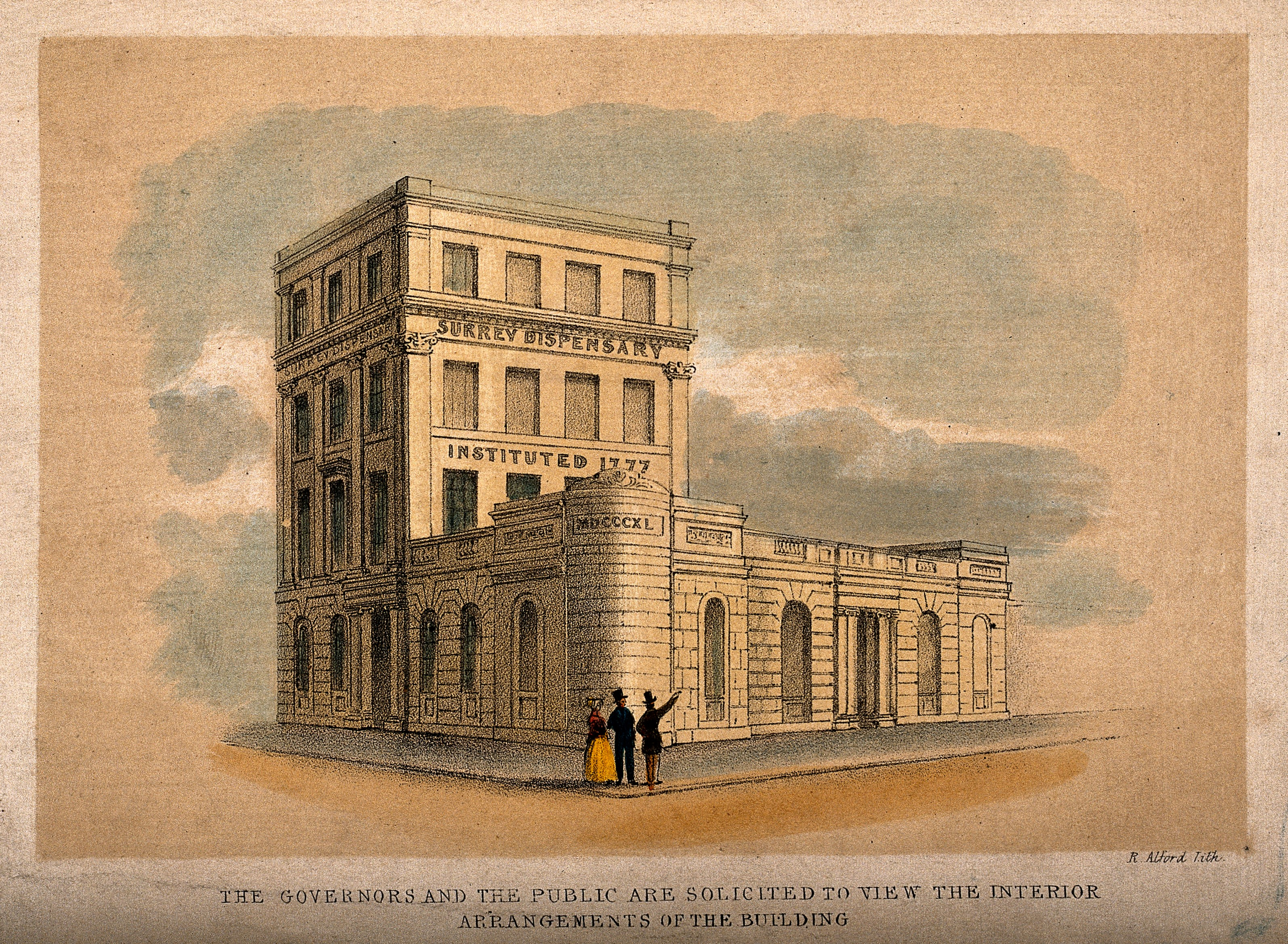
The Surrey Dispensary, Great Dover Street, Southwark. Coloured lithograph by R. Alford, c.1840.

Great Dover Street's name simply indicates that it is an improved route out of the city to the south-east ports. It was created as a turnpike improvement in 1750 for traffic as a by-pass for the 'old' Kent Street/ Kent Road route out of the Borough of Southwark. This older route was renamed Tabard Street and it has close junctions with the new road at both ends. The new route was driven across the Trinity Village estate, belonging to Trinity House.

In 1963, £50,000 was found by police in a phone box in Great Dover Street. It was part of the proceeds from the Great Train Robbery and had been left by an intermediary acting for Buster Edwards.

== Buildings ==
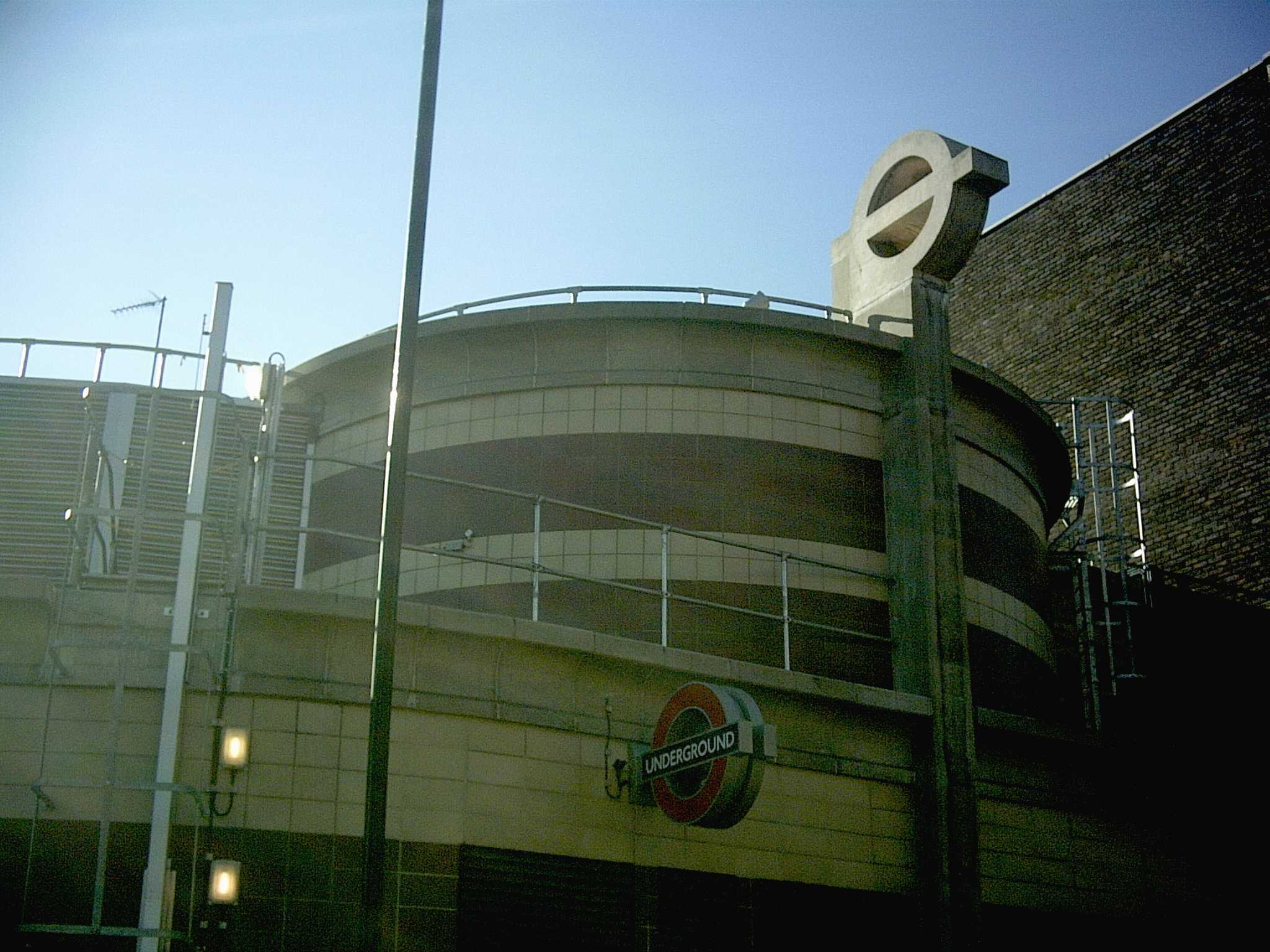
Borough tube station.

For several decades, Great Dover Street has been the site of mainly council tenement blocks. However, as south of the river living has become more popular, these have been supplemented on previously commercial and industrial sites on the route by private sector flats, broadening the residential nature of the area and creating a more varied mixed tenancy population. This has been reinforced by the development of two large university halls of residence: Great Dover Street Apartments, a hall of Residence belonging to King's College London, principally for the nearby Guy's Hospital Campus teaching hospital and neighbouring this that for the London School of Economics 'Sidney Webb House' containing some 1,000 bedsitting/ study units.

The street has three small retail units and three pubs, The Black Horse, The Roebuck (dating from the original turnpike development although rebuilt 1892) and Dover Castle.

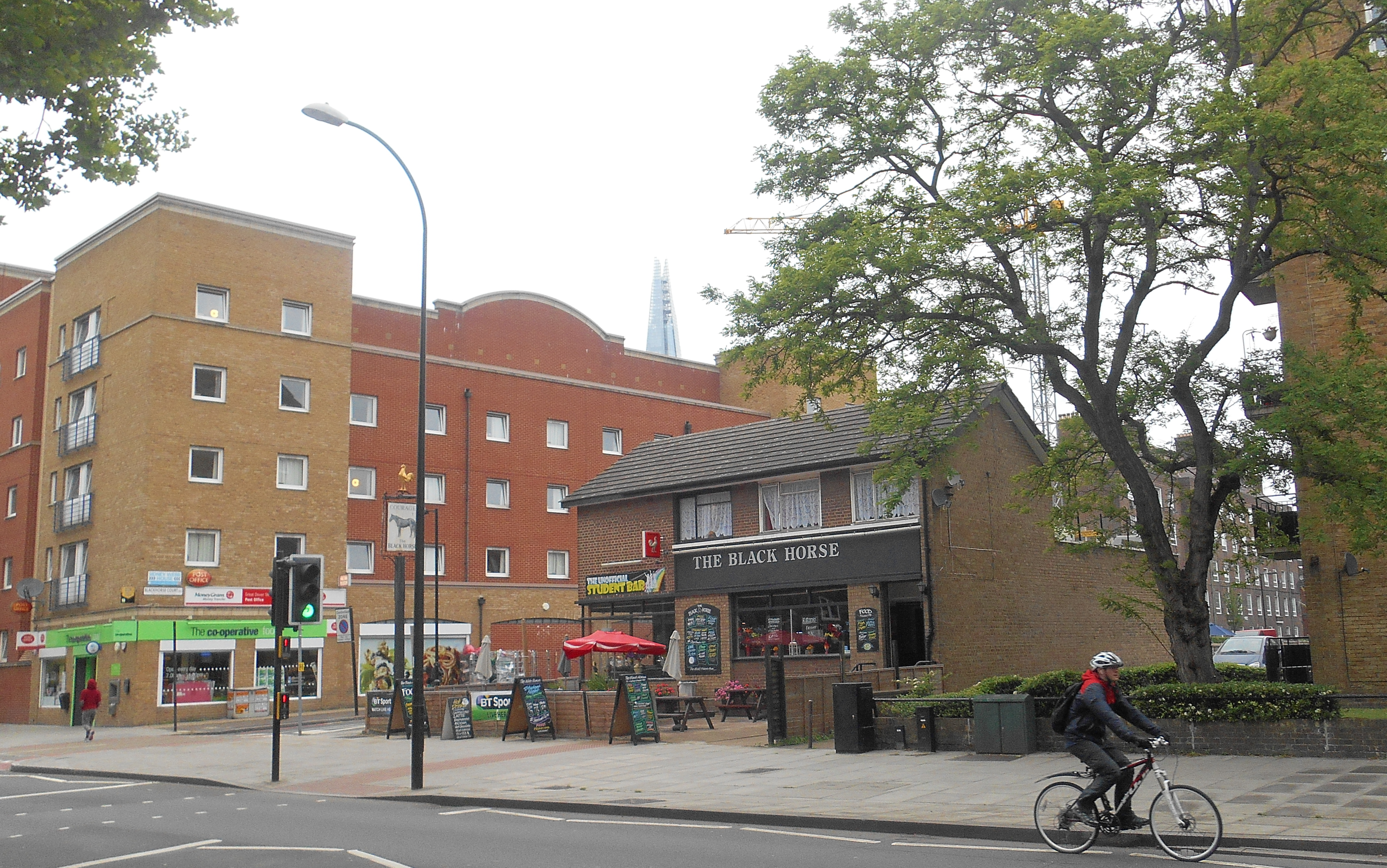
The Black Horse Bar in 2016 (At the corner of Great Dover St. & Black Horse Ct.)
