= Marshalsea Road =

Street in the London Borough of Southwark

Coordinates: 51°30′07″N 0°05′43″W

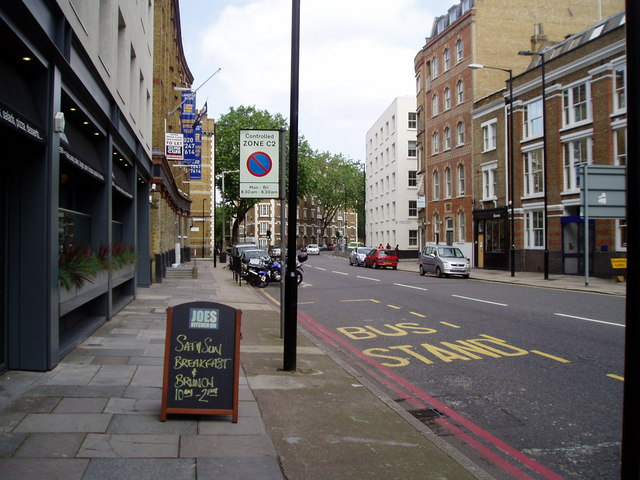
View of Marshalsea Road.

Marshalsea Road (classified A3201) is a major street in Southwark, south London, England. At the northwest end is the Southwark Bridge Road. At the southeast end is Borough tube station on Borough High Street. Continuing across the street are Long Lane and Great Dover Street. At the northeast corner is the historic St George the Martyr church, where the Charles Dickens character Little Dorrit was married in Dickens' book of the same name. The area around Marshalsea Road has many Dickens associations.

Opposite Borough tube station, on the corner of Marshalsea Road and Borough High Street, is Brandon House. This is now the headquarters of Acas (the Advisory, Conciliation and Arbitration Service), an independent non-departmental public body of the UK Government for resolving industrial relations disputes.

The Christian Medical Fellowship (CMF) is located at 6 Marshalsea Street and the Tara Bryan Gallery is at No 10. BCH Architects, specialists in church restoration projects and ecclesiastical architecture, are located at 16–18 Marshalsea Road.

== History ==
The area was previously known as The Mint. It was a slum area with privileges for debtors until The Mint in Southwark Act 1722 removed these rights. The area remained a slum until the 19th century. The only reminder of The Mint is Mint Street off Marshalsea Road, where there used to be a workhouse.

The Marshalsea prison, associated with the Marshalsea Court, was located close to the southeast end of what is now Marshalsea Road, just north of St George's Church. The area has Dickensian connections and the prison was mentioned in the works of Charles Dickens. The Marshalsea was very significant to Dickens since his father was imprisoned at the prison for debt from 2 February 1824 to 28 May 1824. At the time, Dickens lived nearby in Lant Street, just south of Marshalsea Road, in a house that belonged to the Vestry Clerk of St George's Church. The prison was closed in 1842 and only a fragment of wall now remains, forming the north part of St George's churchyard.

In 1875, it was suggested that a new road to connect with Southwark Bridge Road would be beneficial to the traffic congestion on London Bridge. Powers to create such a road were granted to the Metropolitan Board of Works by the 1877 Metropolitan Street Improvements Act. Subsequently, Marshalsea Road was opened in 1888, named after the former prison.

In 1902, a small public open space, known as Little Dorrit's Playground, after the Charles Dickens character, was opened north of Marshalsea Road. Much of the area became derelict as a result of air raid damage during World War II. North of Marshalsea Road is Little Dorrit's Court, also named after the Dickens character.

== Gallery ==
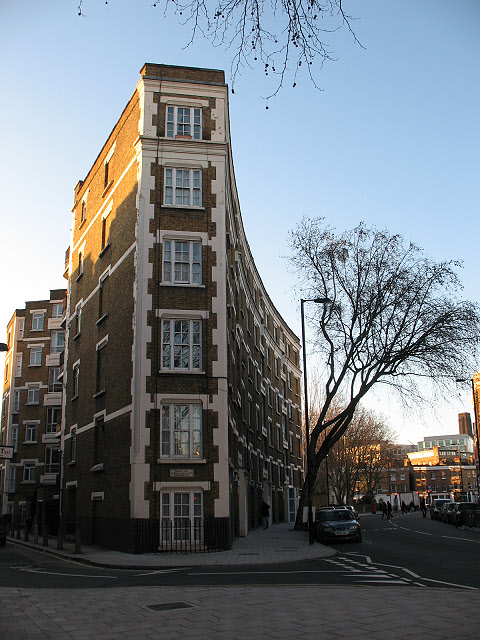
Peabody Trust housing on Marshalsea Road.

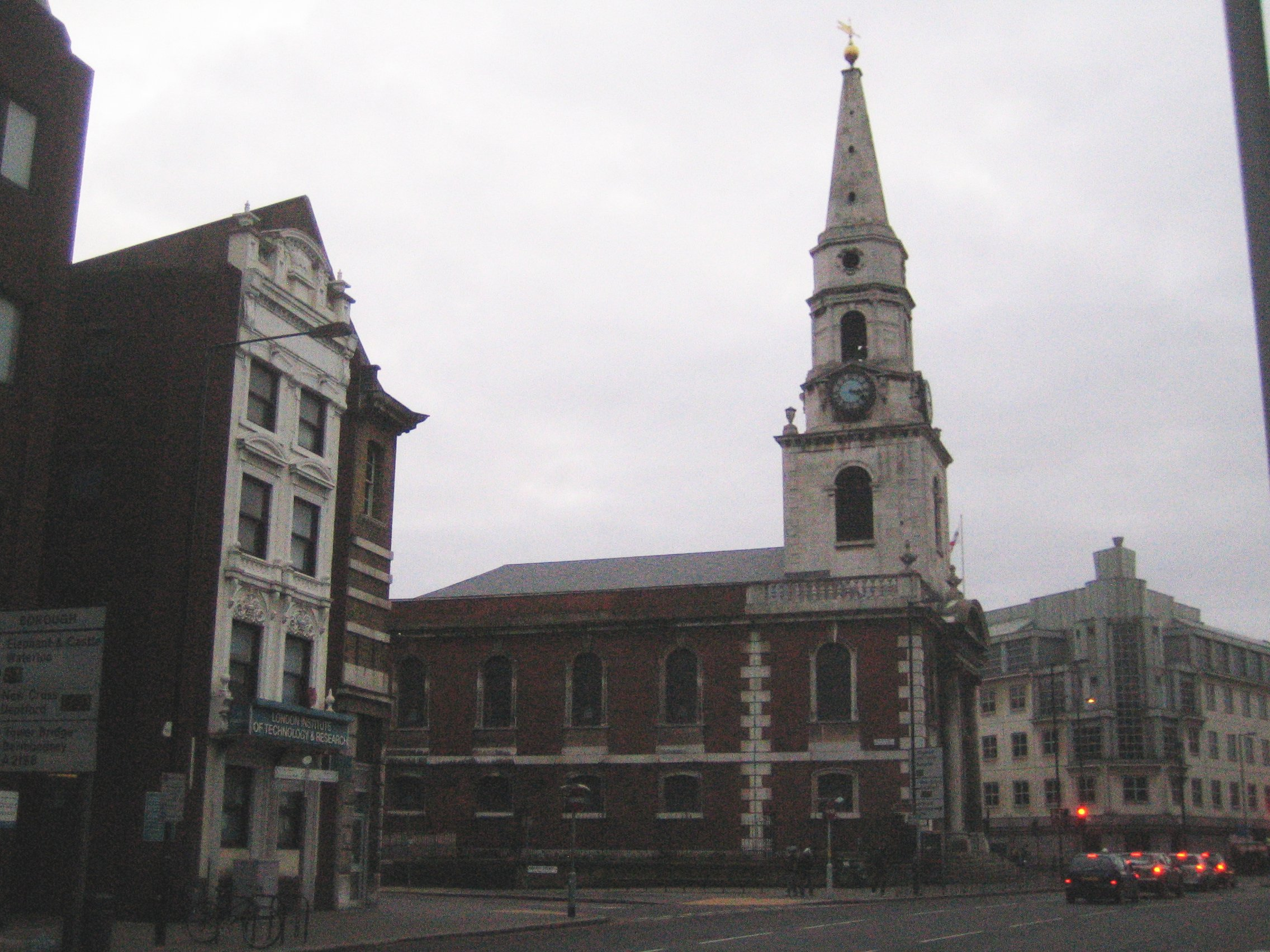
St George the Martyr church opposite the southeast end of Marshalsea Road.

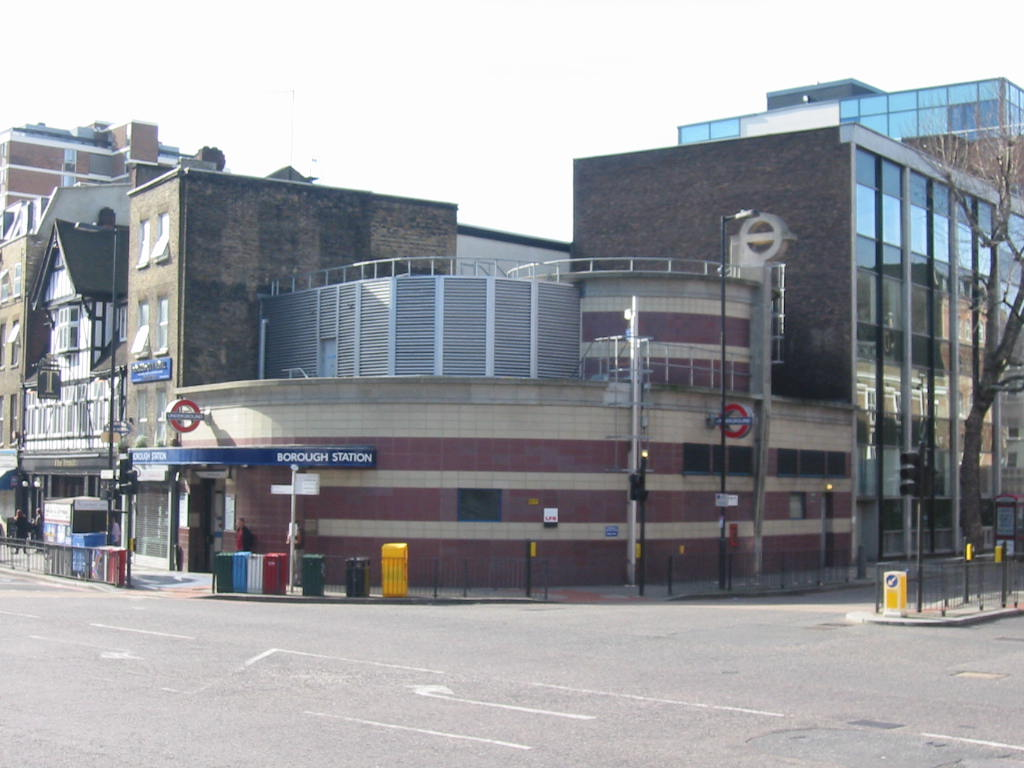
Borough tube station at the southeast end of Marshalsea Road.
