= The Gladstone Arms =

Pub in Southwark, London

- Interactive map of The Gladstone Arms
- Location: Lant Street, Southwark
- Coordinates: 51.50086°N 0.09656°W
- Key people: Megha Khanna, Abhinav Saxena, Gaurav Khanna
- Website: www.thegladpub.co.uk

Active beers
Name	Type
Doom Bar	real ale
Tribute	real ale

Other beers
Name	Type
Addlestones Cloudy	cider

Inactive beers
Name	Type
Black Sheep Best Bitter	real ale

The Gladstone Arms is a public house in Lant Street in the Borough – the Southwark district of London. It is also known as The Glad. Built on the site of a Victorian pub, the current building was constructed in the 1920s. It has been threatened by redevelopment but its popularity as a meeting place and great live music venue have caused it to be recognised as an asset of community value.

== History ==
The pub sign

There has been a public house here since the 19th century and, after Charles Dickens lodged in the street, he subsequently referred to it in The Pickwick Papers. The current structure was rebuilt in the interwar period of the 20th century. It is named after William Ewart Gladstone who was prime minister four times in the 19th century. In addition to its traditional drinking clientele, it attracts young, creative types and gays.

== Music ==
It is used as a live music venue and has its own record label. The type of music includes folk, blues and rock. Acts who have performed there include Ellie Goulding and Noah and the Whale. The pub is small and intimate and so does not have a stage or elaborate sound system but it is popular and crowded on music nights. It was the local pub Mike Stock, Matt Aitken and Pete Waterman used to hang out at the beginning of their career.

== Closure and re-opening ==
In 2015, the pub was threatened by demolition and redevelopment as a 10-storey block of flats but the planning application was refused after a campaign by the Walworth Society to save it. The building was not listed by Historic England but it was recognised as an asset of community value. The tenancy has been revived since December 2016. Local MP Neil Coyle joined the Campaign for Real Ale in a pub crawl to save this and other local pubs and has been successful. The pub was inactive and boarded up for a period (between November 2016 and April 2017) after the building's owner demanded a rent hike of £30k, causing the previous management to close the business. New managers Megha Khanna, Abhinav Saxena and Gaurav Khanna took over the lease in April 2017.
