= St George the Martyr, Southwark =

St George the Martyr
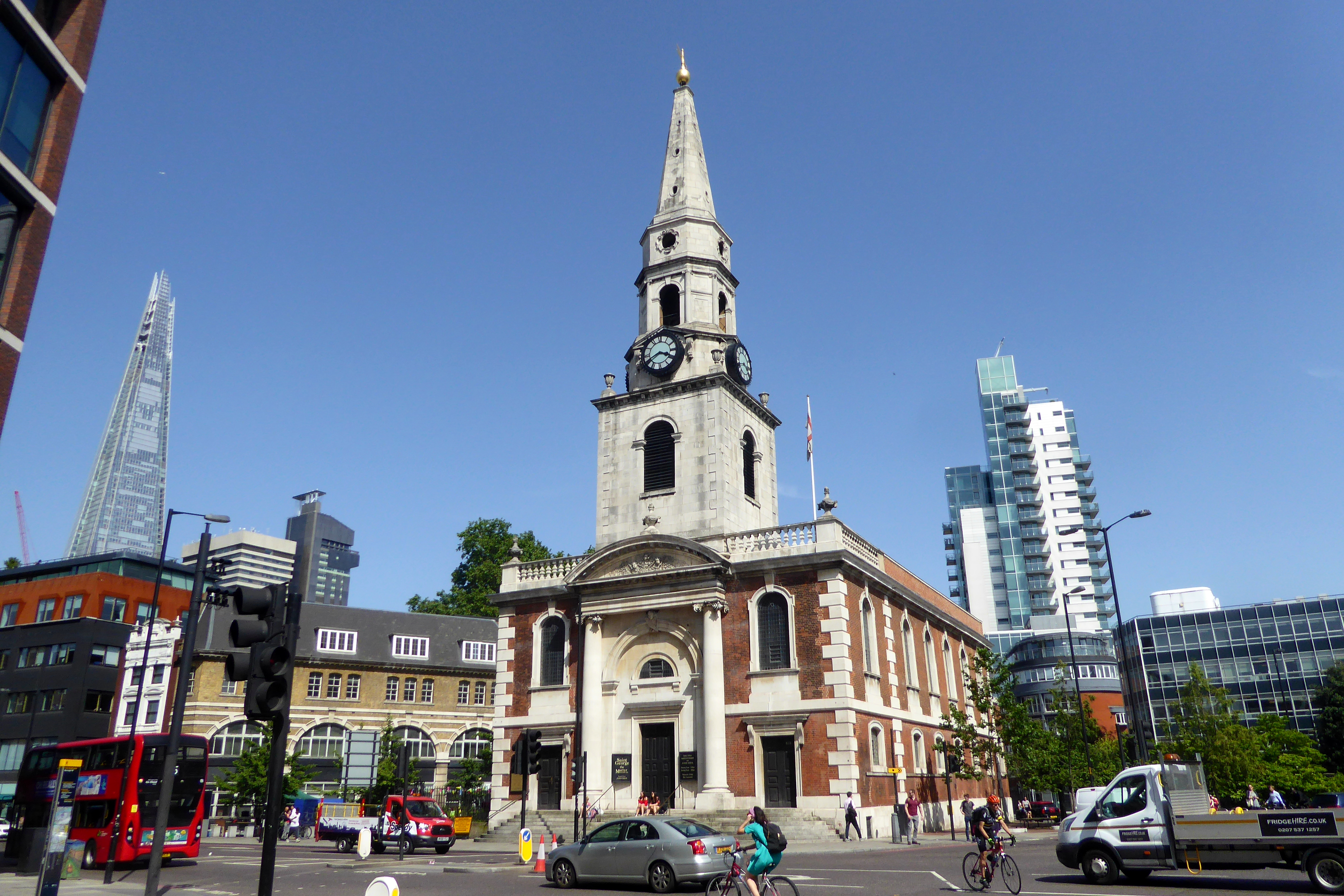
- St George the Martyr looking south along Borough High Street

- Location within Central London
- 51°30′05″N 0°05′34″W
- OS grid reference: TQ 32491 79763
- Location: The Borough, London Borough of Southwark
- Country: England
- Denomination: Church of England
- Tradition: Anglican Catholic
- Website: www.borough.church

Architecture
- Heritage designation: Grade II*
- Architect: John Price

Administration
- Diocese: Southwark

Clergy
- Rector: Fr Benjamin Bell

St George the Martyr is a church in the historic Borough district of south London. It lies within the modern-day London Borough of Southwark, on Borough High Street at the junction with Long Lane, Marshalsea Road, and Tabard Street. St George the Martyr is named after Saint George. The church is a Grade II* listed building.

The church has strong associations with Charles Dickens, whose father was imprisoned for debt in the Marshalsea prison. The surviving wall of the prison adjoins the north side of the churchyard. Dickens himself lived nearby, in Lant Street, lodging in a house that belonged to the Vestry Clerk of St George's. This was during the darkest period of his life when, as a teenager, with his father in prison, he had to work in the 'blacking factory', and his literary career must have seemed an impossible dream. Later, he was to set several scenes of the novel Little Dorrit in and around St George's Church. There is a small representation of Little Dorrit in the east window of the church.

It is also a recognised church of the City of London Company of Parish Clerks and the guild church of the Guildable Manor. From 2008 the annual Southwark Quit Rents ceremony, before the Queen's Remembrancer has taken place there.

== History ==
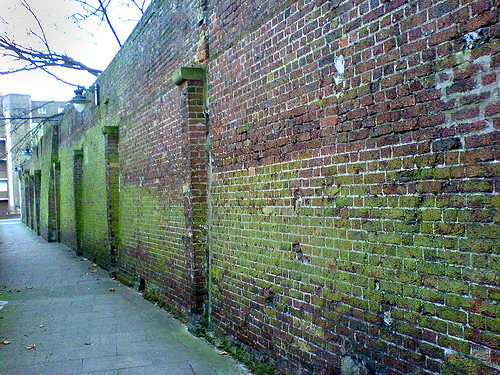
Surviving wall of the Marshalsea debtors' prison at the north side of the churchyard.

According to traditional hagiography, Saint George served as a soldier in the Roman Army and was killed on the orders of the emperor Diocletian in 303 for refusing to persecute Christians and confessing to his own Christianity. The earliest reference to the church in Southwark is in the Annals of Bermondsey Abbey, which claim that the church was given by Thomas Ardern and Thomas his son in 1122. The date follows the Battle of Acre when tales of Saint George were popularised by European, especially Norman, crusaders; perhaps the church dedication is related to the Arderns' involvement in the Crusade. This gift included tithes from their manor at Horndon in Essex and "land of London Bridge returning five solidos". This statement indicates that this St George's is the first church with this dedication in Greater London, and predates Edward III's adoption of him as the patron of the Order of the Garter by over 200 years. The statement is also the first reference to London Bridge's endowment lands. The present priest was nominated by the city's Bridge House Estates.

On Henry V's return from his victory at the Battle of Agincourt in 1415, he was welcomed by the Aldermen of London on the steps of the church. The 'Agincourt Song' was commissioned as part of the celebration. In this battle the standard with the red-on-white Saint George's Cross was used for the first time. In the same year St George became the patron saint of England.

The west tower dominates views along Borough High Street from both the north and south due to the curve in the street at this point, where it now meets Great Dover Street. Originally, a much narrower road to the south of the church called Church Street led into Kent Street (now renamed Tabard Street), the historic route to Dover. Due to the volume of traffic, Great Dover Street was cut through parallel to Kent Street as part of the road network enhancements for the first road crossing (east of Putney) west of London Bridge, Westminster Bridge, in 1750. Tabard Street was later extended through the churchyard on the north side of the church, leaving the church focal to what was a road island but the east side of which is pedestrianised.

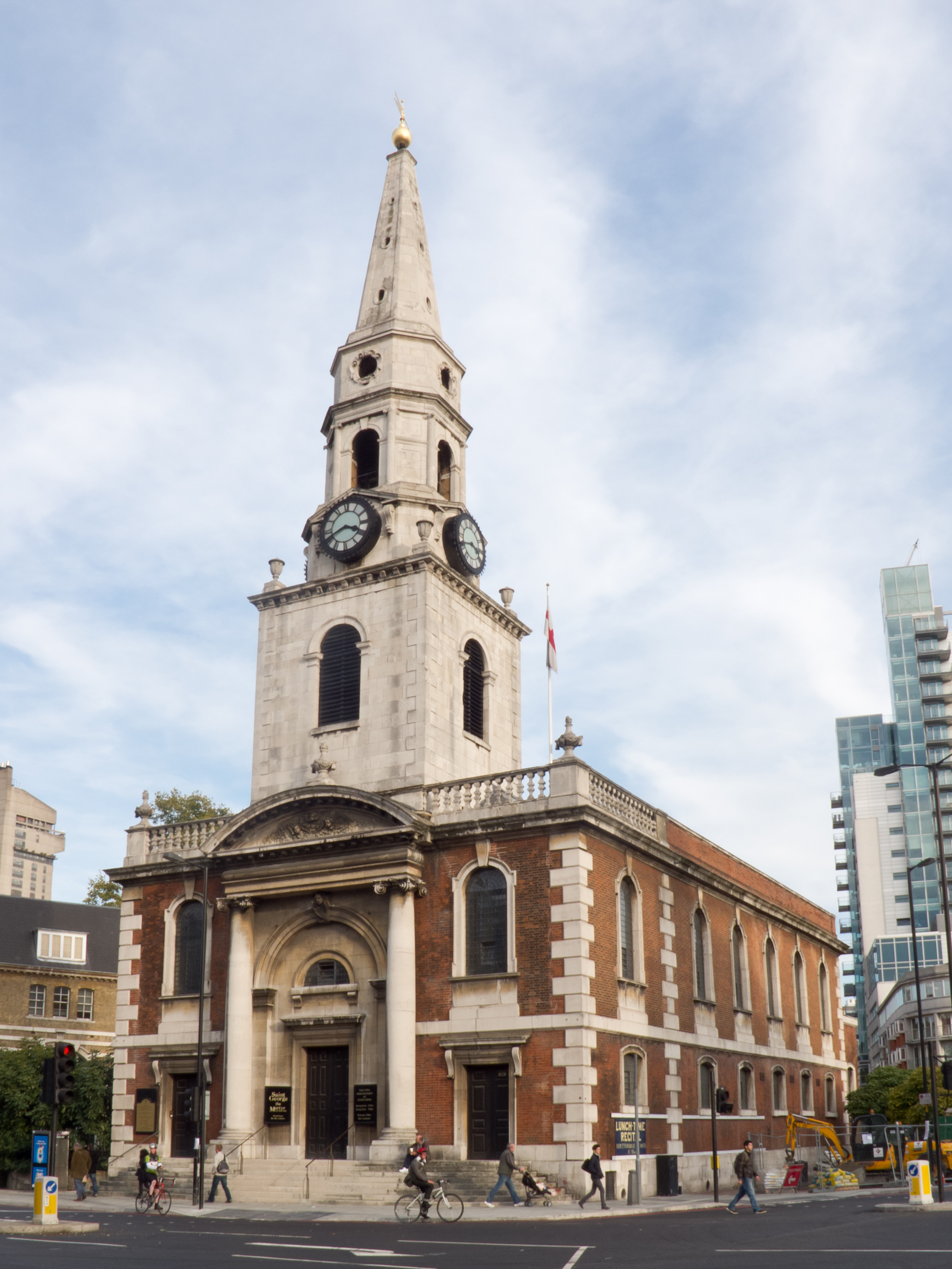
Façade of St George the Martyr church.

The present church is believed to be the third on this site. There was a Norman church of unknown appearance; inscribed stones from it were discovered in the second church. This was replaced at the end of the fourteenth century by a church with a bell tower, which may have been from where Anton van den Wyngaerde surveyed at least part of his plan view of London, which includes a drawing of the church, but slightly out of position as might occur if drawn onto the perspective latterly. The church also appears to be that in William Hogarth's engraving of Southwark Fair made in 1733, a year before it was demolished. The church was rebuilt in a Classical style to the designs of John Price between 1734 and 1736, partly funded by £6,000 from the Commission for Building Fifty New Churches. The major City Livery Companies and the Bridge House Estates also supported this rebuilding, their arms decorate the nave ceiling and stained glass.

In 1852 the Anglican evangelist William Cadman became rector of St.George the Martyr, Southwark, then one of the largest parishes in London with a nominal congregation of 30,000. The church in 1852 was capable of holding 1,000 persons but on Cadman's arrival it was reported that services were largely empty. Cadman stayed until 1859 during which period he revitalised the Parish through a series of reforms. He made St George's church ' the centre of operations from which a body of volunteers worked in all parts of the community. He encouraged and trained lay volunteers, scripture readers and teachers. He recommended establishing either a National or a ragged school in each sub-district with Scripture lessons provided by the local clergy. In the most deprived areas he founded schools that were licensed for worship and Bible study lectures. The local congregations were empowered to lead on the construction of new churches and chapels. During Cadman's tenure as rector of St George The Martyr, a chapel and the new church of St Paul's, Walworth were built.

In 1899, the crypt was cleared and 1,484 coffins were removed and re-interred at Brookwood Cemetery in Surrey. The foundations of the south wall were strengthened in 1938 and helped save the building from collapse during World War II, when the damage from enemy action was considerable.

The red brick and Portland stone structure of the church has suffered from considerable subsidence damage, and the nave was declared unsafe in 2000, although services continued in other parts of the building. In September 2005, St George the Martyr received funding from the Heritage Lottery Fund for repairs and refurbishments, which involve complete underpinning of the building, and the lowering of the floor levels in the crypt to create additional space. A large number of lead Georgian coffins were removed from the crypt to allow the works to take place. Subsequent archaeological investigations of the ground beneath the church found substantial medieval and Roman structures. The destruction of some archaeological remains before a fuller excavation could be completed led to controversy.

The church was closed for restoration works between September 2005 and March 2007. During this time the congregation worshipped at nearby Guy's Chapel. The new 'crypt', in fact a church hall created by the underpinning works, provides a new conference venue in central London. Services at St George's resumed on Palm Sunday, 1 April 2007.

== Architecture ==
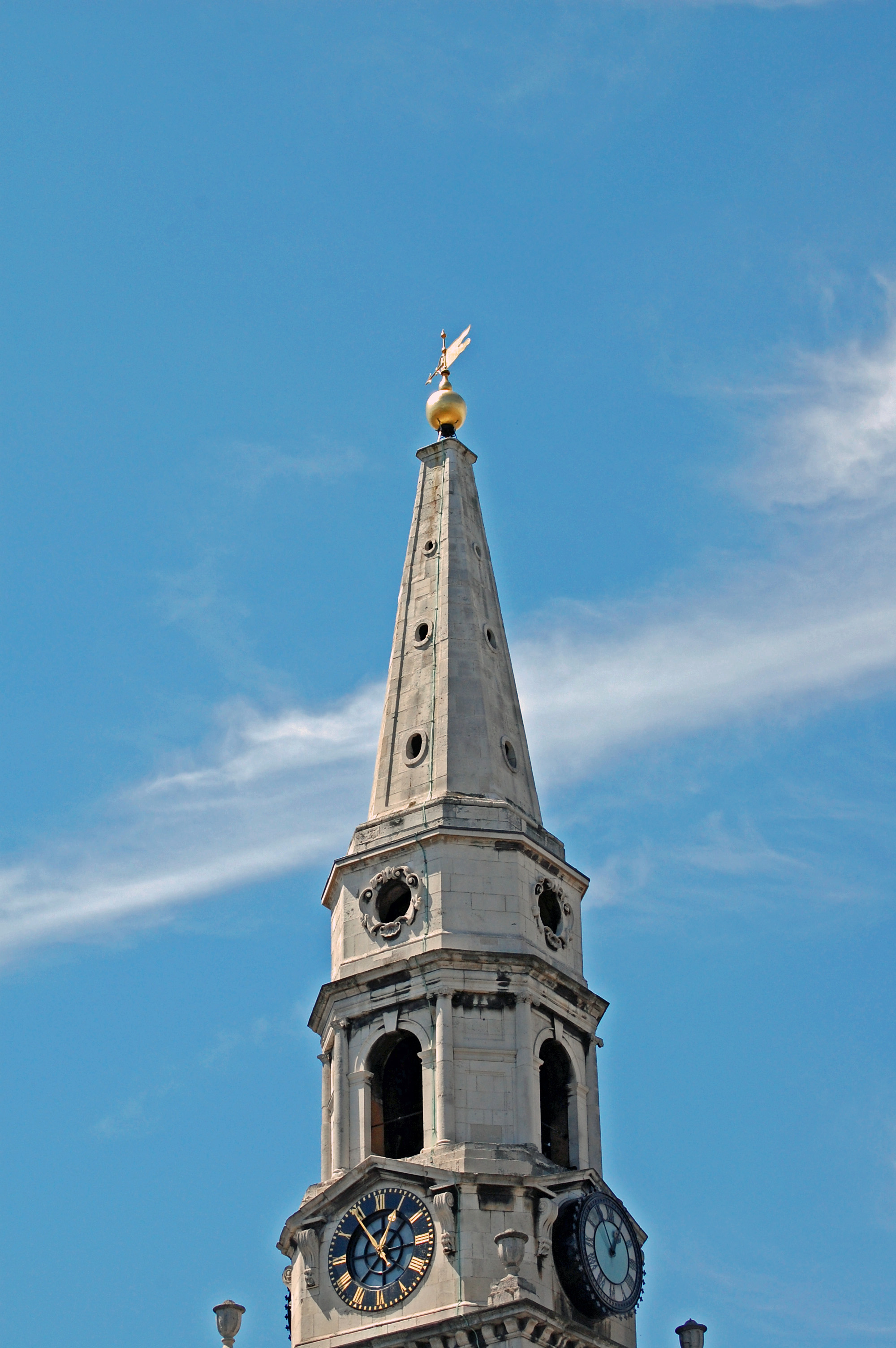
The spire of St George the Martyr

The church is built of red brick with Portland stone, and has a copper and slate roof. There is a pediment at the west entrance, supported by Ionic columns. The tympanum displays reliefs of angels, and there are eight steps leading up to the entrance.

The tower is built of Portland stone, with a large spire. On top of the spire is a ball and weather vane.

Inside, the nave has a gallery on three sides, with a pair of fluted Ionic columns supporting the gallery at the west end. On the ceiling is a painting done by Basil Champneys in 1897 of cherubs breaking through a clouded sky, with texts on a ribbon. The coats of arms of four of the City Livery Companies (the Skinners, Grocers, Fishmongers and Drapers) appear on a frieze. The chancel has three bays. There is a tall pulpit on four Ionic columns, and an octagonal font of grey marble.

The east window of the church, which includes a kneeling figure of Dickens' character Amy Dorrit, was designed by Marion Grant.

Like St James Garlickhythe in the City of London, St George the Martyr has two reliefs of the Royal Arms. Both are of the House of Stuart. The main one, located on the gallery at the west end, is said to have come from the former church of St Michael Wood Street.

== See also ==
- List of churches and cathedrals of London
