= Ofra Zimbalista =

Israeli sculptor

- עפרה צימבליסטה
- Born: 1939
- Died: June 22, 2014 (aged 74–75)
- Citizenship: Israeli
- Occupation: Sculptor

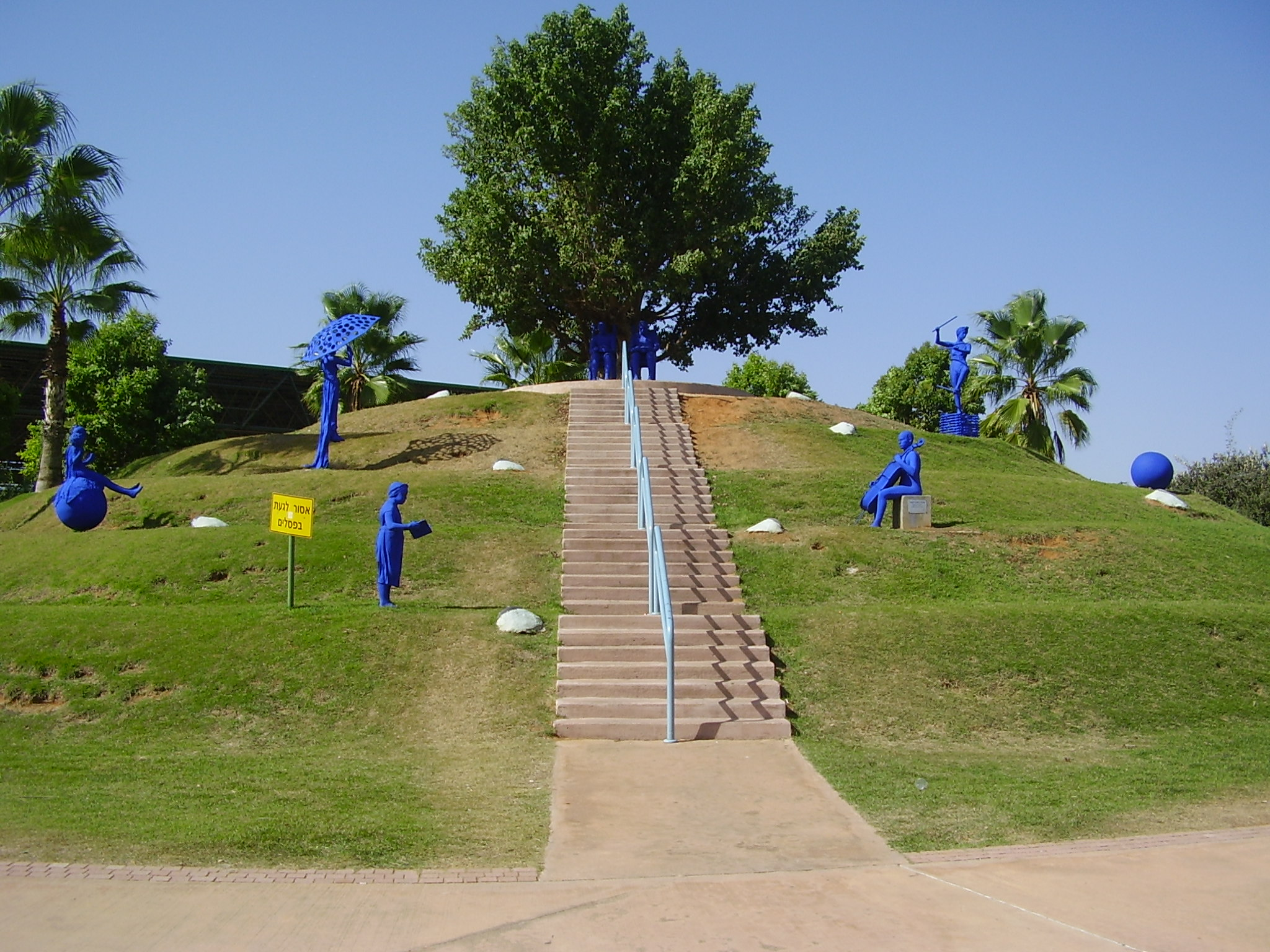
Ofra Zimbalista's "blue men" in the park of Kiryat Ono

Ofra Zimbalista (Hebrew: עפרה צימבליסטה; 1939 – June 22, 2014) was an Israeli sculptor.

In 2024 the Zimbalist Gallery named in her memory was opened in the southeastern part of Tel Aviv.

== Awards ==
- 1981 Golden Palette Prize, International festival of painting, Musee Grimaldi Cagnes-sur-Mer, France
- 1990 The Ministry of Education and Culture work completion prize
- 1992 Cylinder Prize, Omanut La'am, Israel
