= Lant Street =

Street in Southwark, London

Coordinates: 51°30′04″N 0°05′46″W

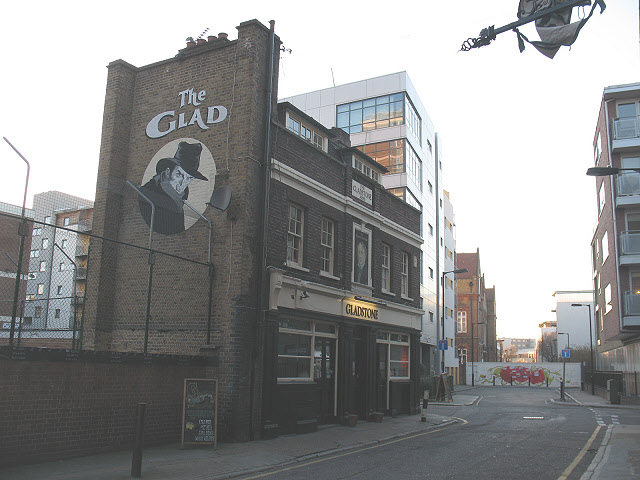
- View of Lant Street and the Gladstone Arms
- Interactive map of Lant Street
- Length: 0.2 mi (0.32 km)
- Postal code: SE1
- northwest end: Southwark Bridge Road
- southeast end: A3; Borough High Street

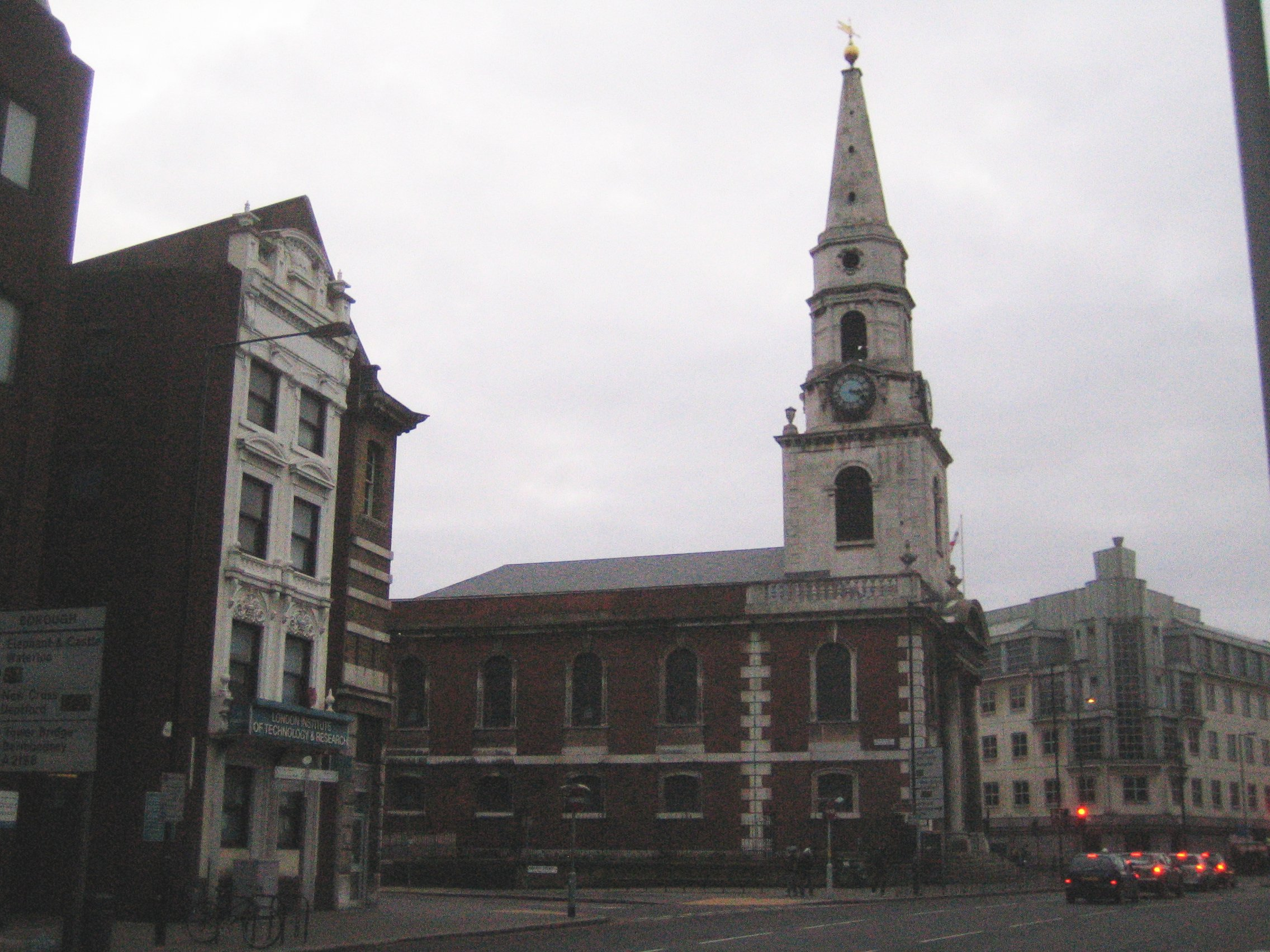
St George the Martyr church, with Charles Dickens associations, close to Lant Street

Lant Street is a street south of Marshalsea Road in Southwark, south London, England.

== Overview ==
At the northwest end is the Southwark Bridge Road and at the southeast end is Borough High Street. Close by, just to the north in Borough High Street, is the historic St George the Martyr church, where the Charles Dickens character Little Dorrit was married in Dickens' book of the same name. The area around Lant Street has many Dickens associations. The street is also one of main locations of the plot of Sarah Waters' Fingersmith.

The word Lant refers to aged urine, used for cleaning, in the manufacture of gunpowder, and ale and pastry making. The road is named, however, in remembrance of the Lant family and Thomas Lant who inherited and owned the nearby land and rented out several hundred homes there from the 18th century.

There is a Lant Street Association for people who live and work in Lant Street. Two historic pubs, the Princes of Wales at No. 23 and The Gladstone Arms at No. 64 are located in Lant Street.

== Notable residents ==
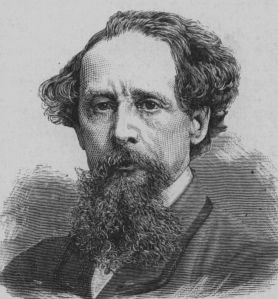
Charles Dickens, a former resident of Lant Street

Charles Dickens is Lant Street's most notable resident. He took lodgings in Lant Street during 1824 while still a child, in a house that belonged to the Vestry Clerk of St George's Church. This was during the period that his father John Dickens was imprisoned in the nearby Marshalsea debtors' prison.

Sir Joseph Lyons was born at 50 Lant Street on 29 December 1847. Lyons was a self-made businessman and went on to own the Lyons Cornerhouses, a chain of tea shops run by J. Lyons and Co., established in 1887.

== History of the area ==
The area around Lant Street, mainly to the north, was previously known as The Mint. It was a slum area with privileges for debtors until The Mint in Southwark Act 1722 removed these rights. The area remained a slum until the 19th century. The only reminder of The Mint is Mint Street off Marshalsea Road, where there used to be a workhouse.

The Marshalsea prison, associated with the Marshalsea Court, was located a little to the north of the southeast end of Lant Street, just north of St George's Church. The prison was mentioned in the works of Charles Dickens.

In 1902, a small public open space, known as Little Dorrit's Playground, after the Charles Dickens character, was opened north of Lant Street. Much of the area became derelict as a result of air raid damage during World War II. Also north of Lant Street is Little Dorrit's Court.

In the late 2010s Roman burial sites excavated at 52-56 Lant Street and the nearby 56 Southwark Bridge Road revealed more than two hundred inhumantions including the remains of a teenage girl known as the "Lant Street Teenager". Of the 18 individuals from the Lant Street cemetery whose DNA was analysed in details, four of them had north African (not sub-Saharan African) ancestry.

== Gallery ==
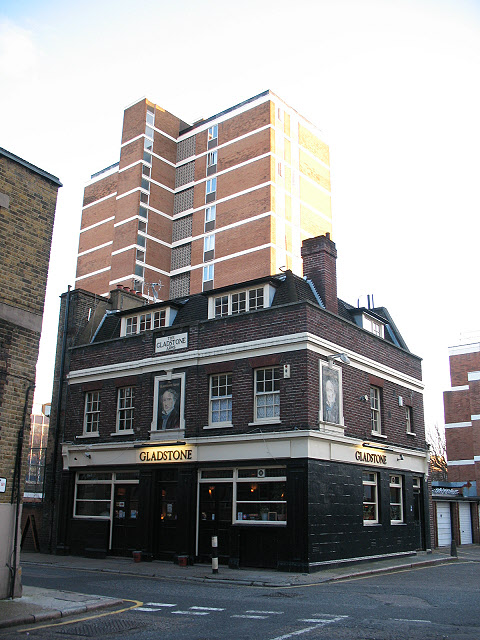
The Gladstone Arms on Lant Street

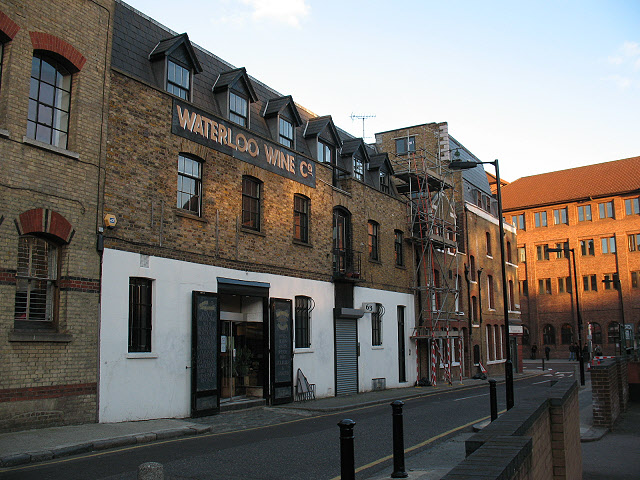
Lant Street Wine Company on Lant Street

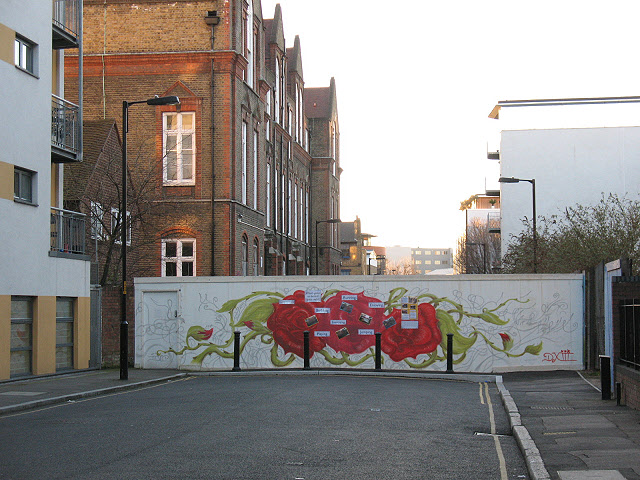
Barricade in Lant Street
