= Southwark Bridge Road =

Road in Southwark, London

Coordinates: 51°30′05″N 0°05′54″W

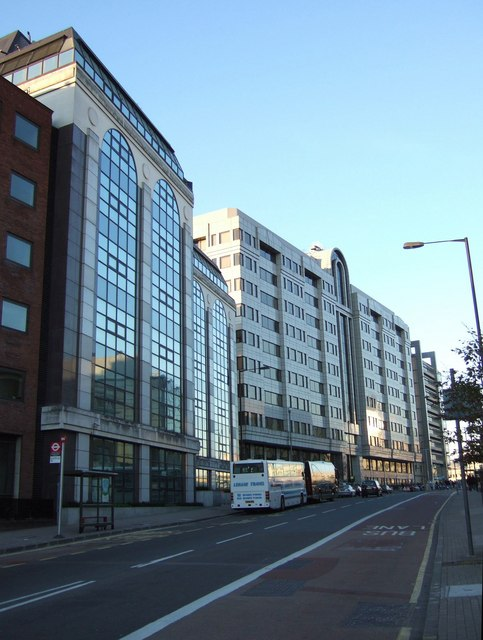
View of Southwark Bridge Road.

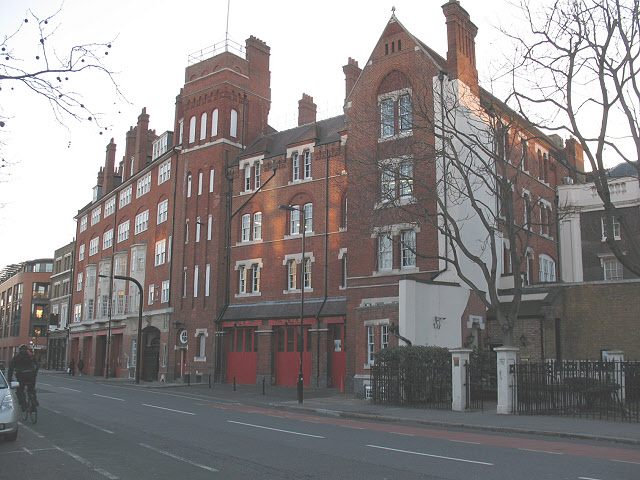
Fire station on Southwark Bridge Road.

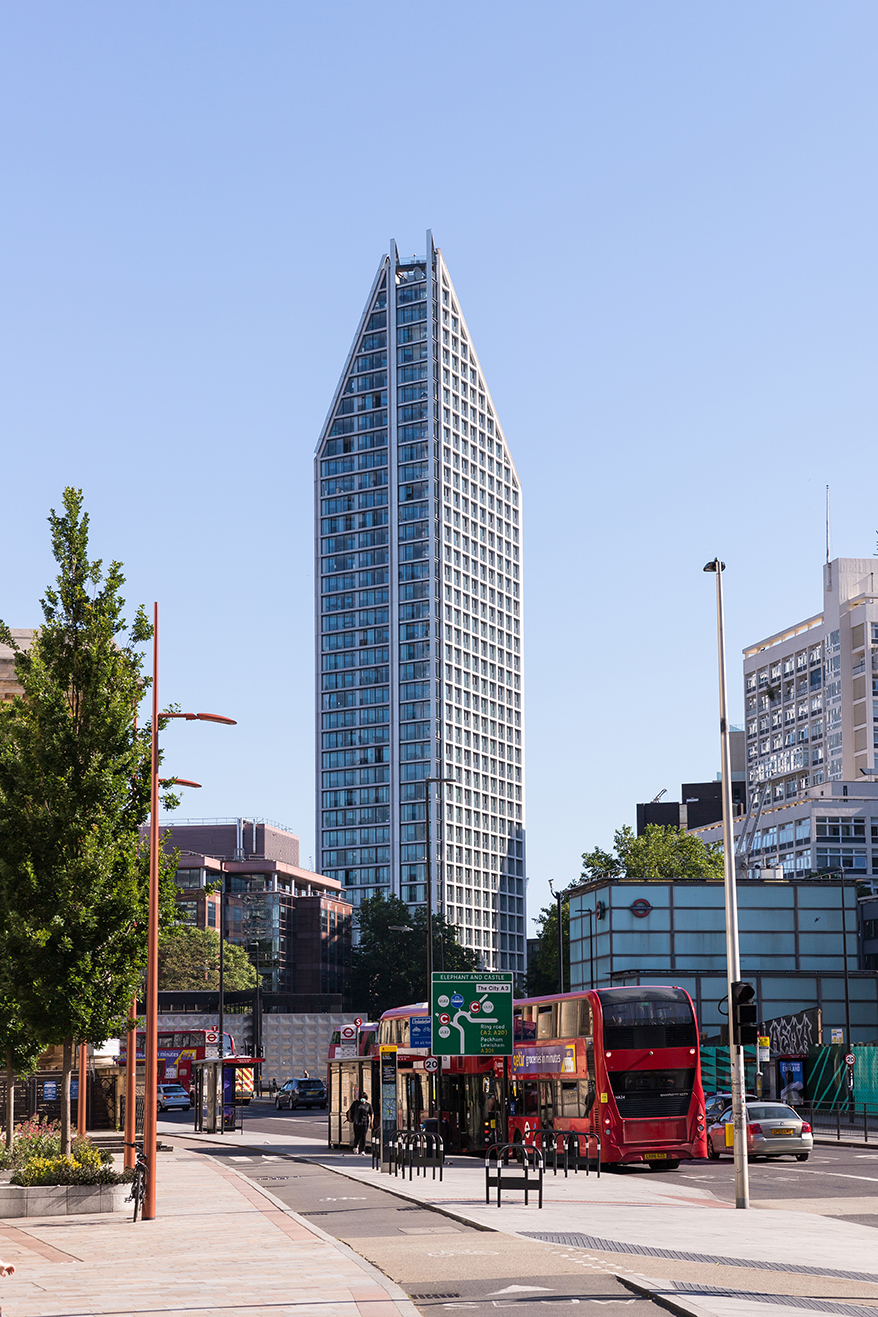
251 Southwark Bridge Road from Elephant and Castle

Southwark Bridge Road is a road in Southwark, London, England, between Newington Causeway near Elephant and Castle and Southwark Bridge across the River Thames, leading to the City of London, in a meandering route.

The road was created by connecting a series of other streets to provide access from the south to Southwark Bridge in 1819, which as a private venture was not able to use the publicly financed road system which had been created to improve access from the south to the City and the Westminster areas by the building of Westminster Bridge and Blackfriars Bridge in the late 18th Century which junction of routes combine at St George's Circus. This connection did not come about until the creation of Southwark Street in the 1880s. It does not start at the main northern roads junction at Elephant and Castle either.

At the southern end is the campus of London South Bank University. The Ministry of Sound, a well-known nightclub, is in Gaunt Street, just to the east, and is faced with Two Fifty One, a new mixed-used high-rise building, the construction of which generated issues for the club.

The London Fire Brigade Museum and the London Fire Brigade Training Centre were located on the road before the site started to be redeveloped in 2015.

At the northern end, across Southwark Street near the river are the Rose Theatre Exhibition, the Financial Times headquarters and Anchor Terrace, a Georgian building standing on the site of Shakespeare's original Globe Theatre.

The road is designated the A300.

== Major adjoining roads and streets ==
- Borough Road
- Marshalsea Road
- Southwark Street
- Union Street
