= Borough tube station =

London Underground station

Borough
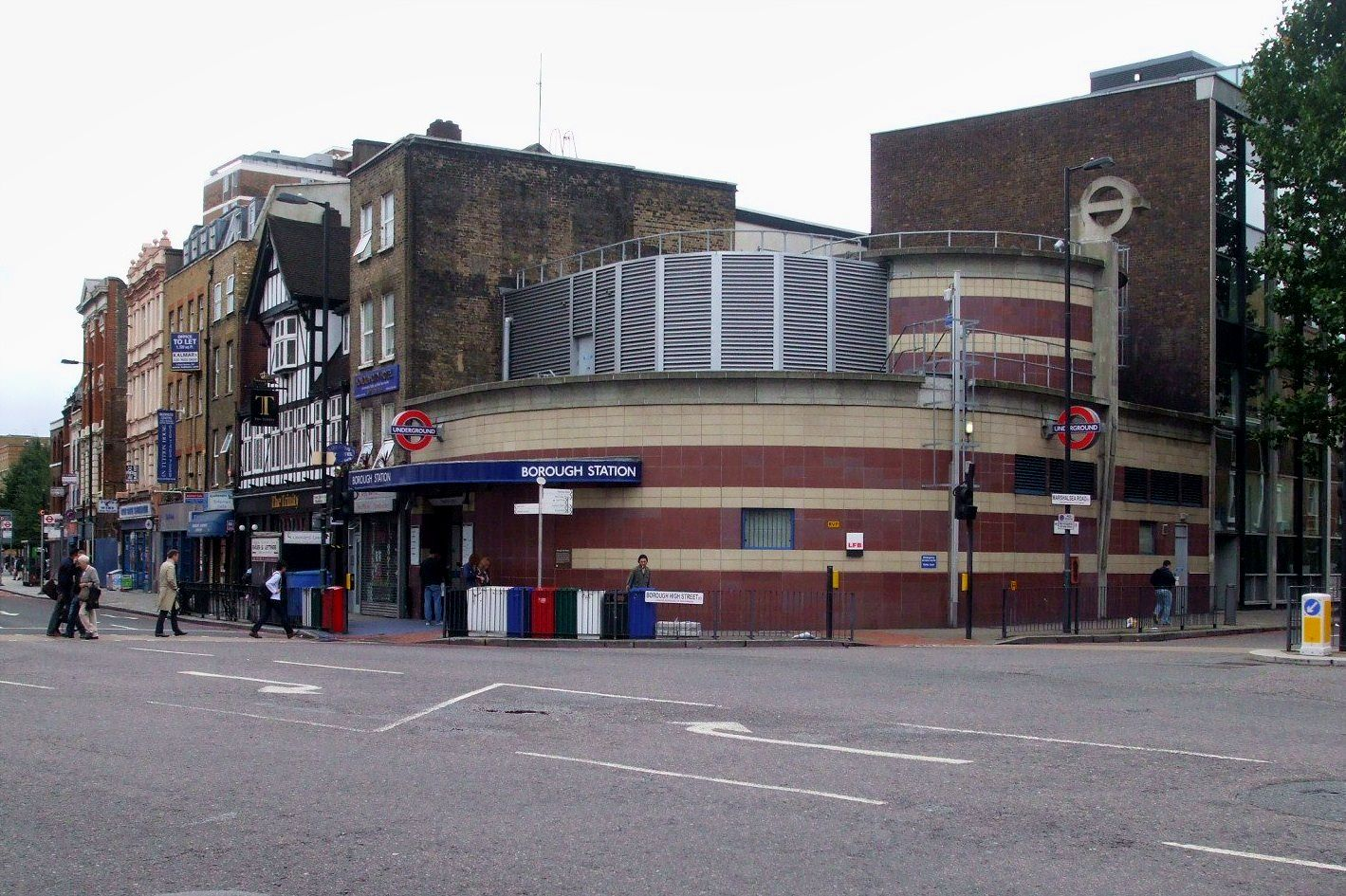
- Entrance on Borough High Street
- Interactive map of Borough

General information
- Location: The Borough
- Local authority: London Borough of Southwark
- Managed by: London Underground
- Number of platforms: 2
- Accessible: Yes (Northbound only)
- Fare zone: 1

London Underground annual entry and exit
- 2020: ▼1.47 million
- 2021: ▲2.07 million
- 2022: ▲3.74 million
- 2023: ▲4.07 million
- 2024: ▲4.18 million

Railway companies
- Original company: City and South London Railway

Key dates
- 18 December 1890: Opened (C&SLR)
- 1922: Closed for tunnel reconstruction
- 1925: Reopened
- 15 January 2022: Temporary closure
- 16 May 2022: Reopened

Other information
- External links: TfL station info page
- Coordinates: 51.501°N 0.093°W

Borough (/ˈbʌrə/) is a London Underground station. It is located in the Borough area of the London Borough of Southwark in central London. The station is on the Bank branch of the Northern line, between London Bridge and Elephant & Castle stations. It is in London fare zone 1.

The station entrance is in Borough High Street (part of the A3), on the corner of Marshalsea Road. The A2 terminates opposite it.

== History ==
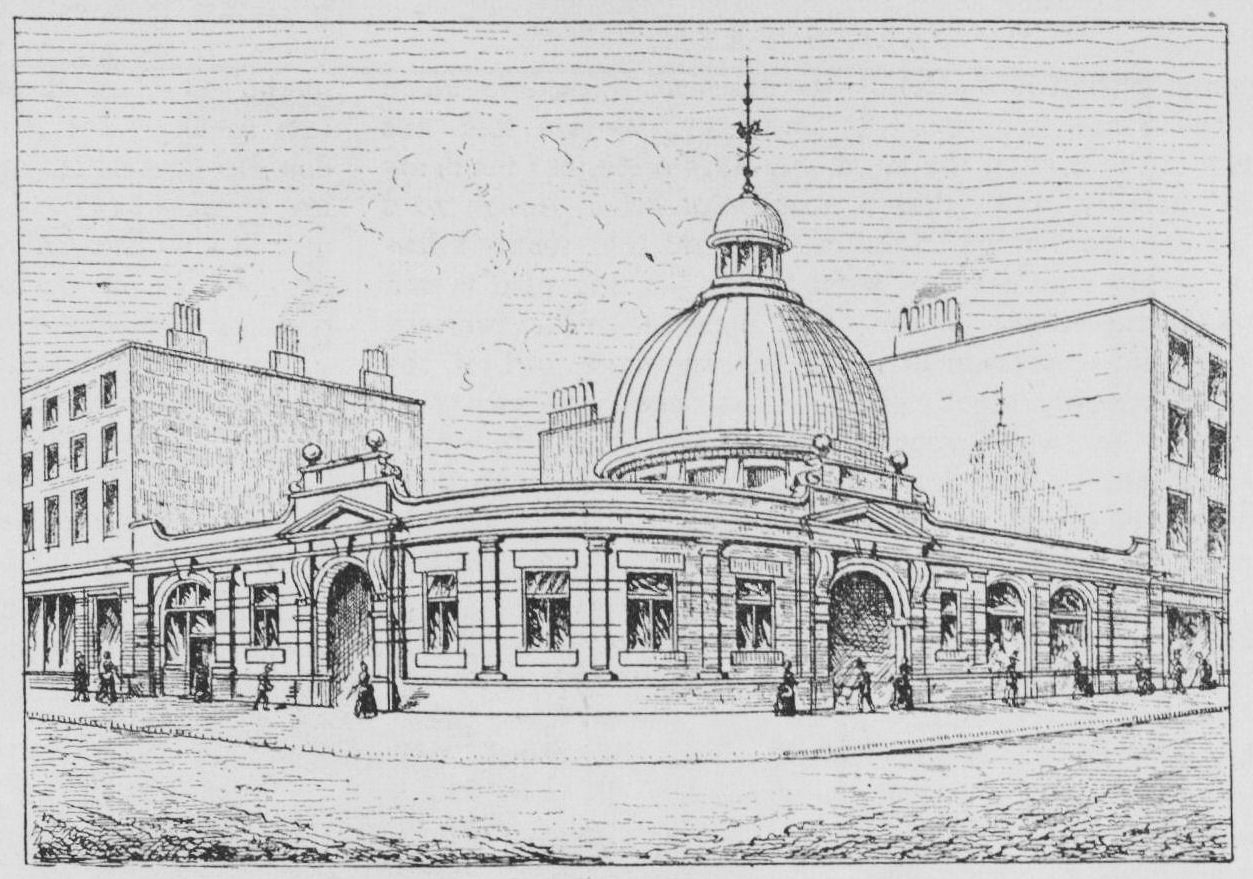
Borough station in 1890

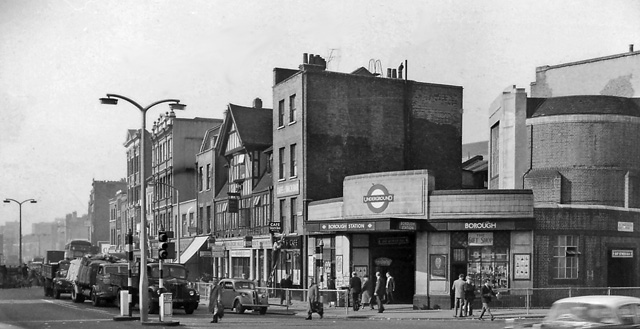
Station entrance in 1961

The station was opened on 18 December 1890 as part of the first successful deep-level tube railway, the City and South London Railway (C&SLR), and was rebuilt in 1922 when the tunnels were enlarged.

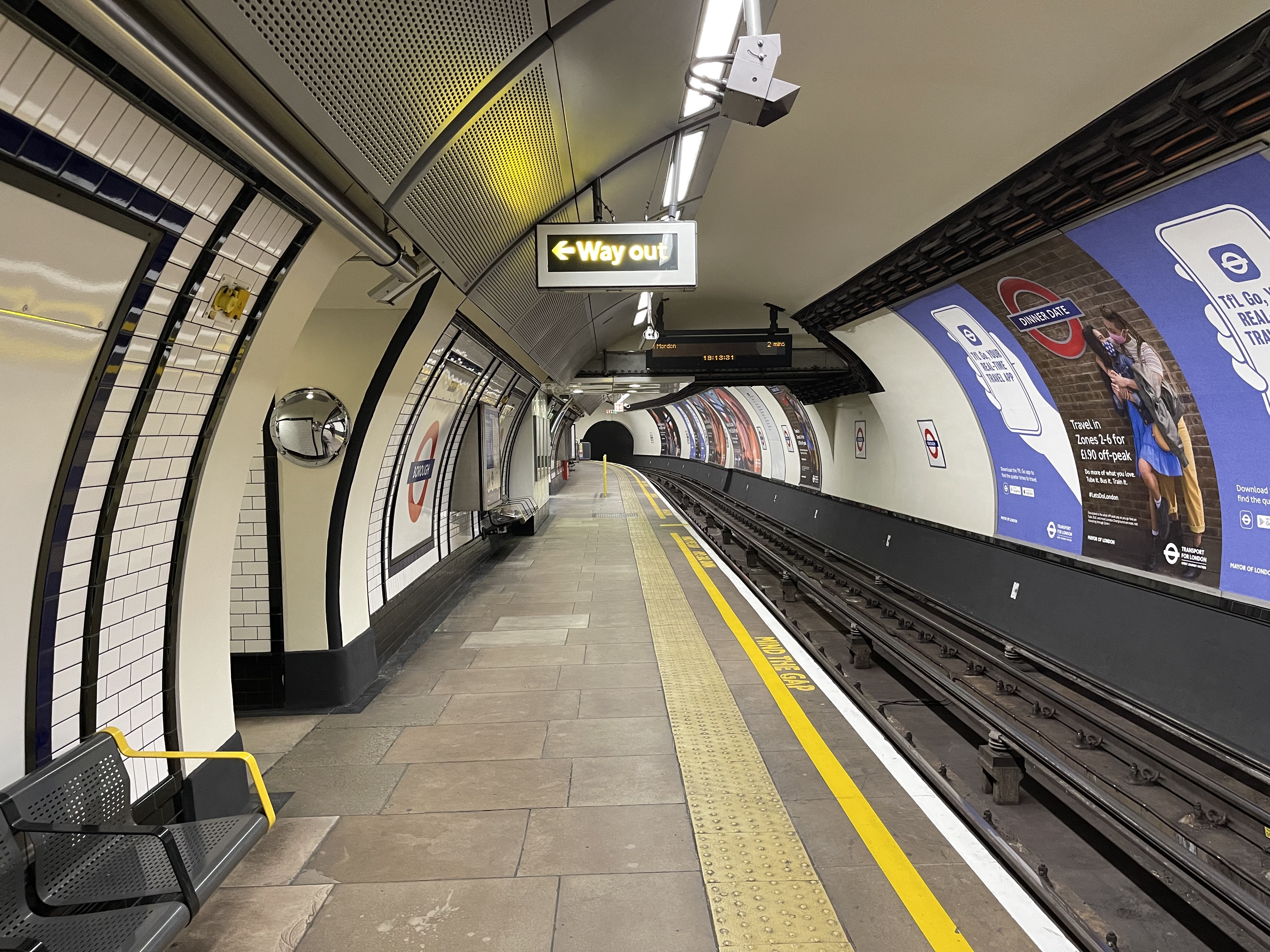
The southbound platform, looking north, after the 2022 refurbishment. This platform is directly below the northbound platform. It is only accessible via a narrow flight of stairs as stated. The arch of the exit passage is almost entirely hidden by modern panelling

Although little of the original surface building remains at Borough, it originally bore a close resemblance to Kennington station. These similarities extended to the layout below ground, although here it is Kennington that no longer retains the original design. Borough station has level access to the northbound platform from the lifts, making this platform accessible to those with mobility restrictions. The southbound platform is a floor lower down, accessible only by narrow stairs; the original architectural finishes to this have been obscured by modern station infrastructure, but the original appearance would have been comparable with those still visible on the southbound platform at Kennington.

Borough is the most northerly of the original remaining C&SLR stations. North of here the railway initially followed a different route from the present one, with the tunnels running to the original terminus at King William Street. This route was abandoned in 1900 when new tunnels on a different alignment to London Bridge and Moorgate were opened. Nevertheless, the original tunnels passed close enough to the location of London Bridge station for them to still be visible through a vent, immediately above the middle of the southbound platform there.

During the Second World War, parts of the disused tunnels between Borough and the south side of the River Thames were adapted into a large public air-raid shelter by Southwark Borough Council. The shelter had six entrances along Borough High Street; it opened on 24 June 1940 and closed on 7 May 1945. A plaque at the station records this.

The lifts from the 1922 reconstruction were replaced in 1985, during which time the spiral staircase was the only way in and out of the station.

On 15 January 2022, Borough tube station closed temporarily until mid-May 2022, to allow major upgrade works at Bank station to be finished. During the closure, refurbishment works were carried out at Borough. It reopened on 15 May 2022 although the official opening was on 16 May 2022.

== Connections ==
London Buses routes 21, 35, 133, 343, C10 and night routes N21, N133 and N343 serve the station.

Preceding station	London Underground	Following station
London Bridge towards Edgware, Mill Hill East or High Barnet	Northern line Bank branch	Elephant & Castle towards Morden
Former Route
Preceding station	London Underground	Following station
King William Street Terminus	Northern line (1890–1900)	Elephant & Castle towards Stockwell
