= Marshalsea =

Former prison in Southwark, London

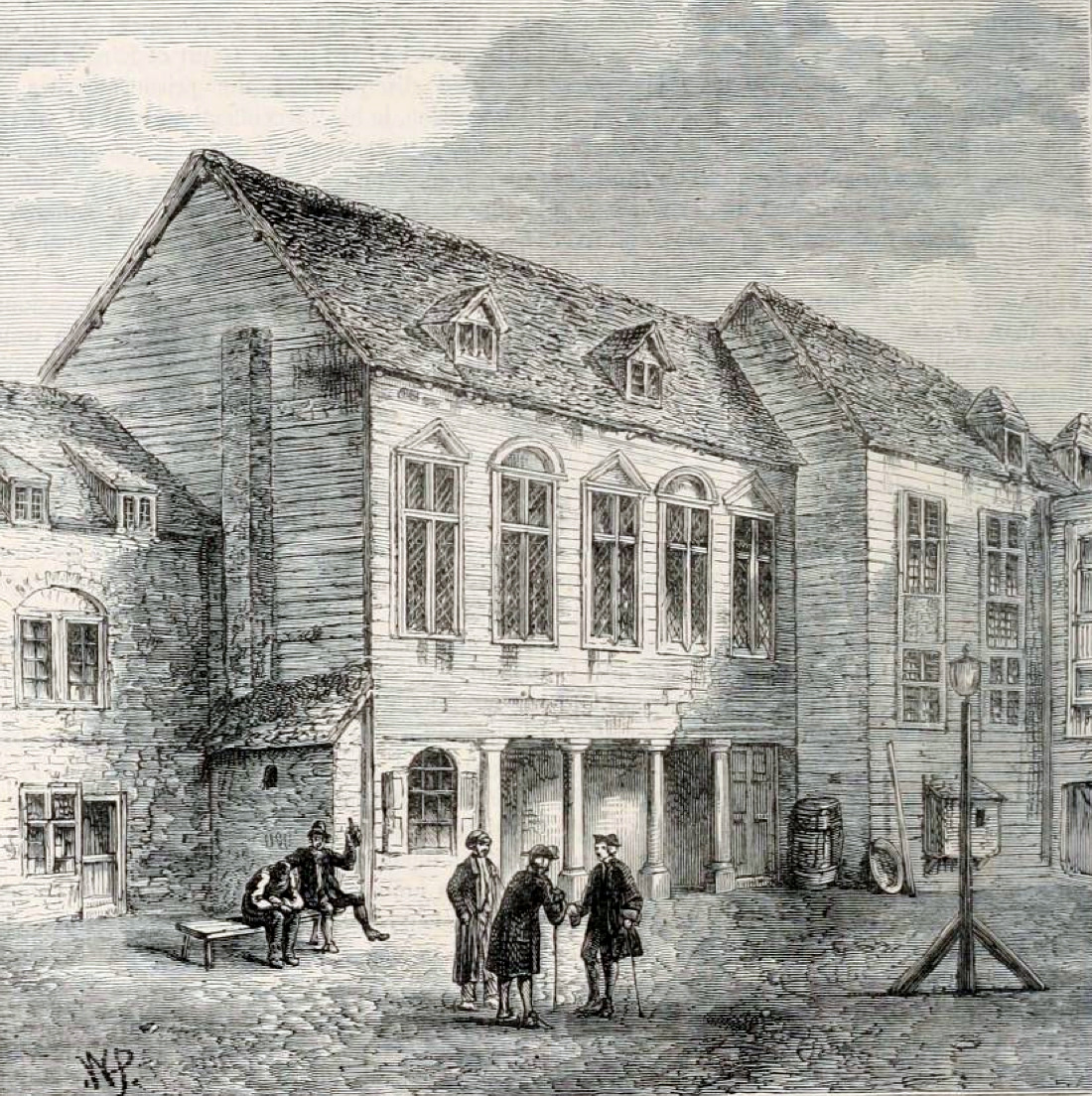
- First Marshalsea Prison, 18th century
- Interactive map of Marshalsea
- Location: The prison occupied two locations in Southwark on what is now Borough High Street, the first 1373–1811, the second 1811–1842.; 51.5018°N 0.0921°W
- Population: Debtors, pirates, smugglers, those accused of sedition
- Managed by: The Knight Marshal of the royal household

Notable prisoners
- Edmund Bonner, John Dickens, Sir John Eliot, John Baptist Grano, Ben Jonson, Thomas Malory, John Selden, George Wither

The Marshalsea (1373–1842) was a notorious prison in Southwark, just south of the River Thames. Although it housed a variety of prisoners—including men accused of crimes at sea and political figures charged with sedition—it became known, in particular, for its incarceration of the poorest of London's debtors. Over half of England's prisoners in the 18th century were in jail because of debt.

Run privately for profit, as were all English prisons until the 19th century, the Marshalsea looked like an Oxbridge college and functioned as an extortion racket. Debtors in the 18th century who could afford the prison fees had access to a bar, shop and restaurant, and retained the crucial privilege of being allowed out during the day, which gave them a chance to earn money for their creditors. Everyone else was crammed into one of nine small rooms with dozens of others, possibly for years for the most modest of debts, which increased as unpaid prison fees accumulated. The poorest faced starvation and, if they crossed the jailers, torture with skullcaps and thumbscrews. A parliamentary committee reported in 1729 that 300 inmates had starved to death within a three-month period, and that eight to ten were dying every 24 hours in the warmer weather. (Note: Gaols Committee, 14 May 1729: "[A] Day seldom passed without a Death, and upon the advancing of the Spring, not less than Eight or Ten usually died every 24 Hours.")

The prison became known around the world in the 19th century through the writing of the English novelist Charles Dickens, whose father was sent there in 1824, when Dickens was 12, for a debt to a baker. Forced as a result to leave school to work in a factory, Dickens based several of his characters on his experience, most notably Amy Dorrit, whose father is in the Marshalsea for debts so complex no one can fathom how to get him out. (Note: Dickens, Little Dorrit: "The affairs of this debtor were perplexed by a partnership, of which he knew no more than that he had invested money in it; by legal matters of assignment and settlement, conveyance here and conveyance there, suspicion of unlawful preference of creditors in this direction, and of mysterious spiriting away of property in that; and as nobody on the face of the earth could be more incapable of explaining any single item in the heap of confusion than the debtor himself, nothing comprehensible could be made of his case. To question him in detail, and endeavor to reconcile his answers; to closet him with accountants and sharp practitioners, learned in the wiles of insolvency and bankruptcy; was only to put the case out at compound interest of incomprehensibility. The irresolute fingers fluttered more and more ineffectually about the trembling lip on every such occasion, and the sharpest practitioners gave him up as a hopeless job.")

Much of the prison was demolished in the 1870s, although parts of it were used as shops and rooms into the 20th century. A local library now stands on the site. All that is left of the Marshalsea is the long brick wall that marked its southern boundary, the existence of what Dickens called "the crowding ghosts of many miserable years" recalled only by a plaque from the local council. "[I]t is gone now," he wrote, "and the world is none the worse without it."

== Background ==
=== Etymology, Marshalsea Court ===
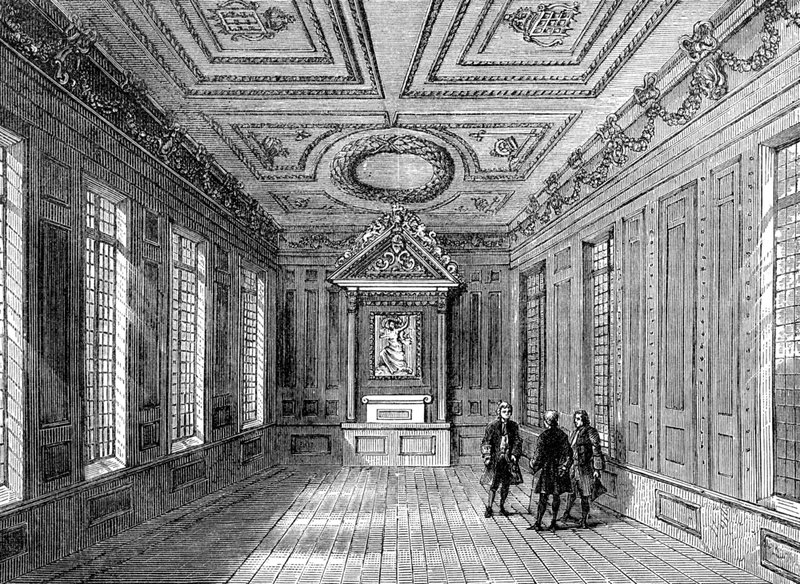
Inside the Marshalsea Court, 1800, part of the prison

Marshalsea or marshalcy referred to the office of a marshal, derived from the Anglo-French mareschalcie. Marshal originally meant farrier, from the Old Germanic marh (horse) and scalc (servant), later a title bestowed on those presiding over the courts of Medieval Europe.

Marshalsea was originally the name of the Marshalsea Court. The prison was built to hold those brought before that court and the Court of the King's Bench, to which Marshalsea rulings could be appealed. Also known as the Court of the Verge, and the Court of the Marshalsea of the Household of the Kings of England, the Marshalsea court was a jurisdiction of the royal household. From around 1290, it governed members of the household who lived within "the verge", defined as within 12 miles (19 km) of the king. From 1530 to 1698 the verge was usually 12 miles around the Palace of Whitehall, the royal family's main residence, but the Marshalsea was an ambulatory court that moved around the country with the king, dealing with trespass, contempt and debt. Increasingly it came to be used by people not connected to the royal household.

=== Southwark ===
Settled by the Romans around 43 AD, Southwark served as an entry point into London from southern England, particularly along Watling Street, the Roman road from Canterbury. This ran into what is now Southwark's Borough High Street and from there north to old London Bridge. The area became known for its travellers and inns, including Geoffrey Chaucer's Tabard Inn. The itinerant population brought with it poverty, prostitutes, bear baiting, theatres (including Shakespeare's Globe) and prisons. In 1796 there were five prisons in Southwark—the Clink, King's Bench, Borough Compter, White Lion and the Marshalsea—compared to 18 in London as a whole.

=== Prisons in England ===
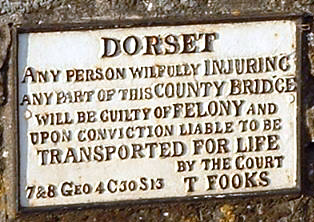
Notice remaining on a bridge in Sturminster Newton, Dorset, warning that anyone who damages it may be subject to penal transportation

Until the 19th century imprisonment in England was not viewed as a punishment, except for minor offences such as vagrancy; prisons simply held people until their creditors had been paid or their fate decided by judges. Options included execution (ended 1964), flogging (1961), the stocks (1872), the pillory (1830), the ducking stool (1817), joining the military, or penal transportation to America or Australia (1867). In 1774 there were just over 4,000 prisoners in Britain, half of them debtors, out of a population of six million. (In 2010 there were over 85,000 prisoners in England and Wales out of a population of 56 million.) (Note: Before the United States Declaration of Independence in 1776, Britain transported 30,000 convicts to the American colonies between 1719 and 1772. Thereafter prisoners were held in disused ships called hulks, moored in the Thames and at Plymouth and Portsmouth. In 1787 penal transportation to Australia began, which saw 164,000 men and women transported on 806 ships between then and 1867. Several prisons built by central government during that period held convicts awaiting transportation, most notably Millbank (built in 1816), and also Parkhurst (1838), Pentonville (1842), Portland (1848), Portsmouth (1850) and Chatham (1856).)

Eighteenth-century prisons were effectively lodging houses. Poorly maintained and often filthy, they might consist of a couple of rooms in a cellar. Before the Gaols Act 1823 (4 Geo. 4. c. 64), then the Prisons Act 1835 and the Prison Act 1877, they were administered by the royal household, the aristocracy and the bishops, and run for profit by private individuals who bought the right to manage and make money from them.

My reader will judge of its malignity [the smell inside prisons] when I assure him that my cloaths were in my first journeys so offensive that in a post chaise I could not bear the windows drawn up: and was therefore often obliged to travel on horseback. The leaves of my memorandum-book were often so tainted, that I could not use it till after spreading it an hour or two before the fire: and even my antidote, a vial of vinegar, has after using it in a few prisons, become intolerably disagreeable.

— John Howard, prison reformer, 1777

Prisoners had to pay rent, feed and clothe themselves and, in the larger prisons, furnish their rooms. One man found not guilty at trial in 1669 was not released because he owed prison fees from his pre-trial confinement, a position supported by the judge, Matthew Hale. Jailers sold food or let out space for others to open shops; the Marshalsea contained several shops and small restaurants. Prisoners with no money or external support faced starvation. If the prison did supply food to its non-paying inmates, it was purchased with charitable donations—donations sometimes siphoned off by the jailers—usually bread and water with a small amount of meat, or something confiscated as unfit for human consumption. Jailers would load prisoners with fetters and other iron, then charge for their removal, known as "easement of irons" (or "choice of irons"); this became known as the "trade of chains".

The prison reformer John Howard travelled around the country in the 1770s inspecting jails, and presented his research in The State of the Prisons in England and Wales (1777). In a jail owned by the Bishop of Ely, Howard wrote, prisoners had ten years earlier been kept chained to the floor on their backs, with spiked collars round their necks and iron bars over their legs. The Duke of Portland had a one-room cellar in Chesterfield that housed four prisoners, with no straw or heat, which had not been cleaned for months. Lord Arundel owned a jail in Penzance, where Howard found a debtor in a room 11 ft × 11 ft and 6 ft high, with a small window. The door of the room had not been opened for four weeks.

=== Debt in England ===
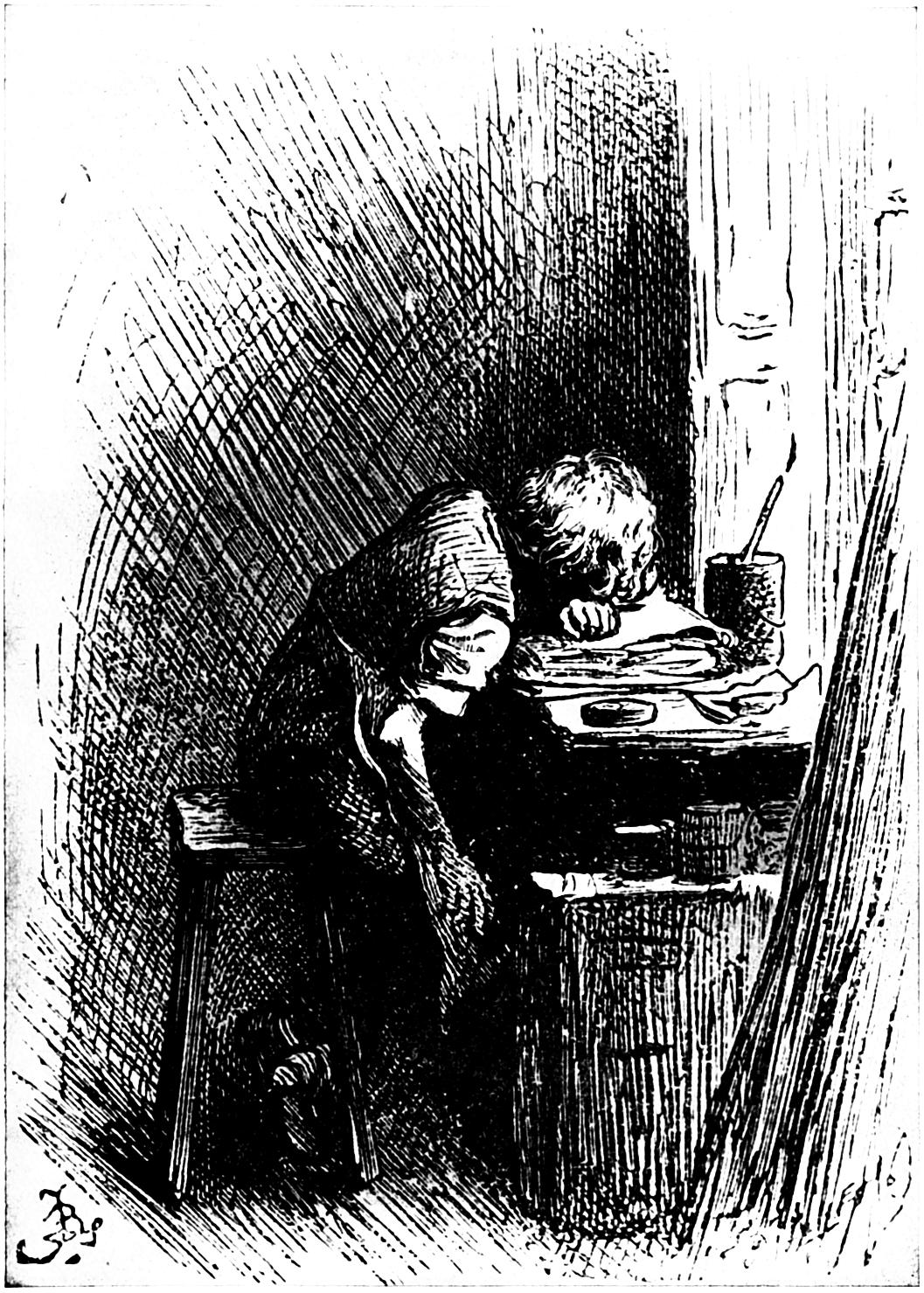
Artist's impression of Charles Dickens, forced to work in a factory when his father was sent to the Marshalsea

Before the Bankruptcy Act 1869, debtors in England were routinely imprisoned at the pleasure of their creditors. Around 10,000 people in England and Wales were in prison for debt in 1641, often for small amounts. In the 18th century debtors comprised over half the prison population: Debtors accounted for 945 of London's 1,500 prisoners in 1779. According to John Wade, writing in 1829, in London in 1826–1827, 753 people were imprisoned for debts under £5, for between 20 and 100 days. In Southwark that year the debts of 1,893 prisoners amounted collectively to £16,442 (equivalent to £1,600,000 in 2025). Other European countries had legislation limiting imprisonment for debt to one year, but debtors in England were imprisoned until their creditors were satisfied. When the Fleet Prison closed in 1842, two debtors were found to have been there for 30 years.

Prisoners would often take their families with them, which meant that entire communities sprang up inside the debtors' jails. The community created its own economy, with jailers charging for room, food, drink and furniture, or selling concessions to others, and attorneys charging fees in fruitless efforts to get the debtors out. Prisoners' families, including children, often had to find employment simply to cover the cost of the imprisonment.

Legislation began to address the problem from 1649 onwards, but it was slow to make a difference. Helen Small writes that, under George III (reigned 1760–1820), new legislation prevented debts of under 40 shillings leading to jail (equivalent to £349 in 2025), but even the smallest debt would exceed that once lawyers' fees were added. Under the Insolvent Debtors Act 1813, debtors could request release after 14 days by taking an oath that their assets did not exceed £20, but if a creditor objected they had to stay inside. Even after they had spent years in prison, their debts remained to be paid.

== First Marshalsea (1373–1811) ==
=== Overview, sources ===
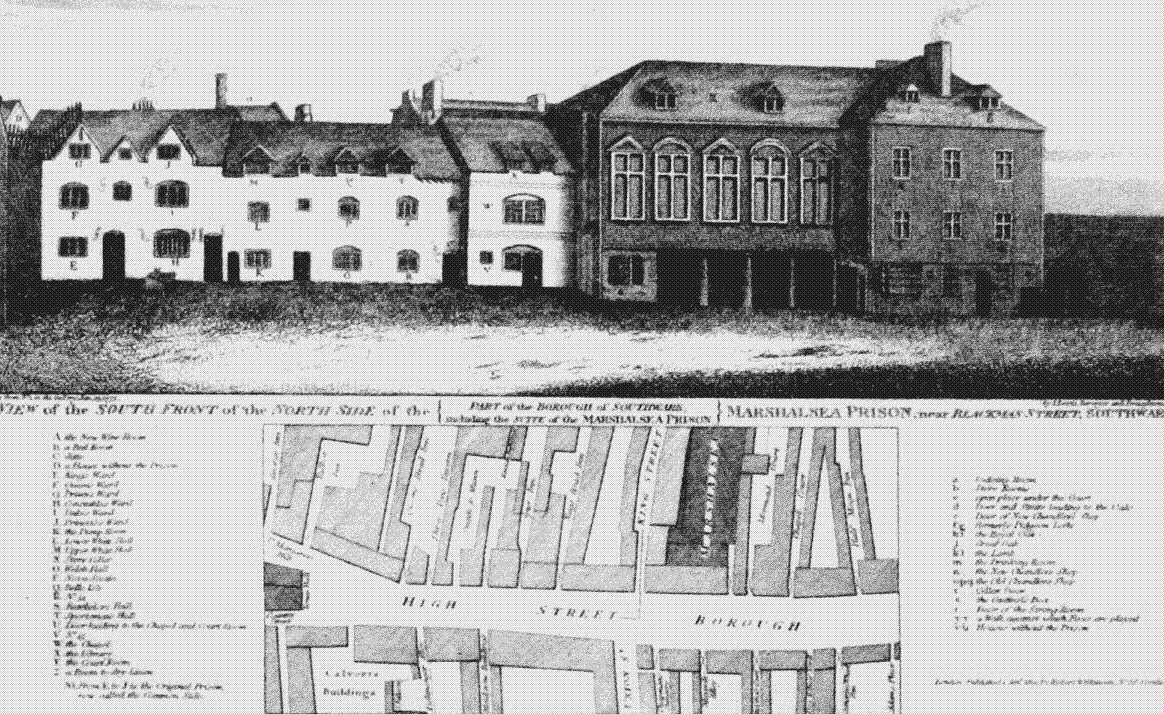
Southern front of the north side of the first Marshalsea, 1773. The building with columns contained the courthouse; to its right are the oaks, with chandler's shop on the ground floor. The door to the notorious strong room, where prisoners were held next to the prison sewer, is farthest on the right. The 'common side' (the 'Original Prison') is the block on the far left.

The Marshalsea occupied two buildings on the same street in Southwark. The first dated back to the 14th century at what would now be 161 Borough High Street, between King Street and Mermaid Court. By the late 16th century, the building was "crumbling". In 1799 the government reported that it would be rebuilt 130 yards (120 m) south on what is now 211 Borough High Street.

Measuring around 150 by 50 feet (46 by 15 metres), with a turreted front lodge, the first Marshalsea was set slightly back from Borough High Street. There is no record of when it was built. Historian Jerry White writes that it existed by 1300, but according to Ida Darlington, editor of the 1955 Survey of London, there is a mention of "the good men of the town of Suthwerk" being granted a licence in 1373 to build a house on Southwark's High Street to hold prisoners appearing before the Marshalsea of the King's household. Darlington writes that earlier mentions of a Marshalsea prison may refer to other prisons, one kept by the Knight Marshal at York and another at Canterbury. (Note: According to White (2009), the prison existed by 1300, but Darlington (1955), citing the Close and Patent Rolls, writes: "The term Marshalsea Prison occurs from 1294 onward, but throughout the mediaeval period it was often used indiscriminately for the prison of the Knight Marshal and for the prison kept by the Marshal of the Court of King's Bench, e.g., in 1324 there is a reference to John de Castello, a rebel, who was in the prison of the Marshalsea at York; and in 1339 John Gerard, 'chaplain', was pardoned for robberies and for escaping from the Marshalsea prison of the King's Bench at Canterbury. There are several references on the Close and Patent Rolls to a royal prison in Southwark in the 13th century, but no indication that there was a definite house allocated for the purpose until 1373, when 'the good men of the town of Suthwerk' were given a licence 'to build in the high street leading from the church of St. Margaret towards the south, a house, 40 feet long and 30 feet wide, in which to hold the pleas of the Marshalsea of the king's household and to keep the prisoners of the Marshalsea while in the said town, and to hold all other the king's courts.'") There is a reference to the Marshalsea prison in Southwark being set on fire in 1381 by Wat Tyler during the Peasants' Revolt. John Cope, esquire, is described as marshal of the marshalsea hospice in 1412; William Bradwardyn was described as marshal in 1421. Robert Fayrford is named as a coroner in the court of the Marshalsea Hospice, in 1433. Further, Henry Langton, as marshall, in 1452.

Most of the first Marshalsea, as with the second, was taken up by debtors; in 1773 debtors within 12 miles of Westminster could be imprisoned there for a debt of 40 shillings. Jerry White writes that London's poorest debtors were housed in the Marshalsea. Wealthier debtors secured their removal from the Marshalsea by writ of habeas corpus, and arranged to be moved to the Fleet or King's Bench, both of which were more comfortable. The prison also held a small number of men being tried at the Old Bailey for crimes at sea.

The Marshalsea was technically under the control of the Knight Marshal, but was let out to others who ran it for profit. For example, in 1727 the Knight Marshal, Philip Meadows, hired John Darby, a printer, as prison governor, who in turn leased it to William Acton, a butcher (who was later tried for murdering three of its prisoners). Acton had previously worked as one of the prison's turnkeys. He paid Darby £140 a year (equivalent to £25,000 in 2025) for a seven-year lease, giving him the right to act as resident warden and chief turnkey, and an additional £260 for the right to collect rent from the rooms, and sell food and drink.

Much of our information about the first Marshalsea is about the prison in the early 18th century, courtesy of three sources. John Baptist Grano (1692 – c. 1748), one of George Frederick Handel's trumpeters at the opera house in London's Haymarket, was jailed there for a debt of £99 (£15,000 today), and kept a detailed diary, A Journal of My Life inside the Marshalsea, of his 458-day incarceration from 30 May 1728 until 23 September 1729. The other two key sources are a 1729 report by a parliamentary committee, led by James Oglethorpe MP, on the state of the Fleet and the Marshalsea, and the subsequent murder trial that year of William Acton, the Marshalsea's chief jailor.

=== Master's side ===
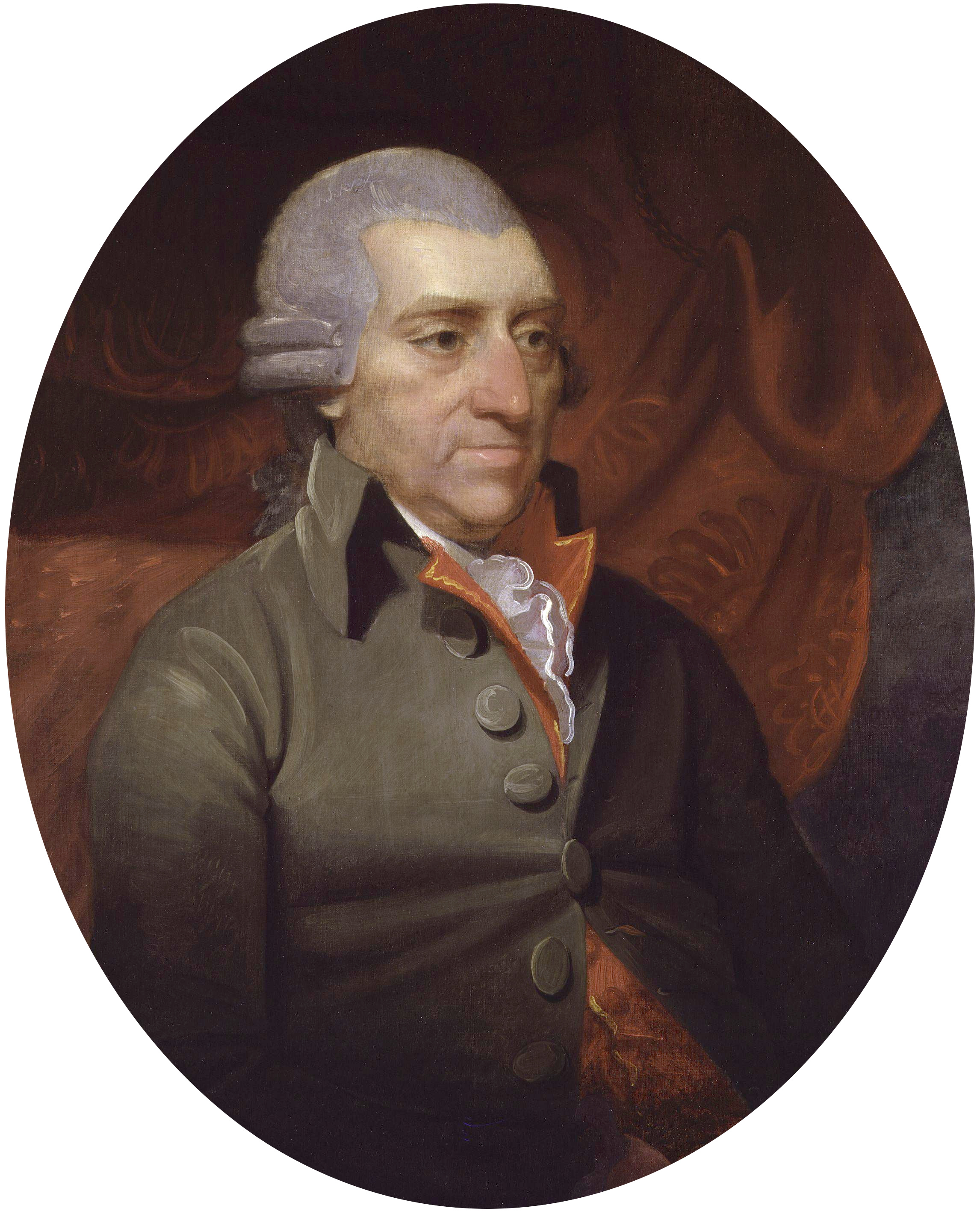
John Howard, the prison reformer, visited the Marshalsea on 16 March 1774.

By the 18th century, the prison had separate areas for its two classes of prisoner: the master's side, which housed about 50 rooms for rent, and the common or poor side, consisting of nine small rooms, or wards, into which 300 people were confined from dusk until dawn. Room rents on the master's side were ten shillings a week in 1728, with most prisoners forced to share. John Baptist Grano paid 2s 6d (two shillings and six pence) for a room with two beds on the master's side, shared with three other prisoners: Daniel Blunt, a tailor who owed £9, Benjamin Sandford, a lighterman from Bermondsey who owed £55, and a Mr. Blundell, a jeweller. Women prisoners who could pay the fees were housed in the women's quarters, known as the oak. The wives, daughters and lovers of male prisoners were allowed to live with them, if someone was paying their way.

Known as the castle by inmates, the prison had a turreted lodge at the entrance, with a side room called the pound, where new prisoners would wait until a room was found for them. The front lodge led to a courtyard known as the park. This had been divided in two by a long narrow wall, so that prisoners from the common side could not be seen by those on the master's side, who preferred not to be distressed by the sight of abject poverty, especially when they might themselves be plunged into it at any moment.

There was a bar run by the governor's wife, and a chandler's shop run in 1728 by a Mr and Mrs Cary, both prisoners, which sold candles, soap and a little food. There was a coffee shop run in 1729 by a long-term prisoner, Sarah Bradshaw, and a steak house called Titty Doll's run by another prisoner, Richard McDonnell, and his wife. There was also a tailor and a barber, and prisoners from the master's side could hire prisoners from the common side to act as their servants.

The prison reformer John Howard visited the Marshalsea on 16 March 1774. He reported that there was no infirmary, and that the practice of "garnish" was in place, whereby new prisoners were bullied into giving money to the older prisoners upon arrival. Five rooms on the master's side were being let to a man who was not a prisoner; he had set up a chandler's shop in one of them, lived in two others with his family, and sublet two to prisoners. During Howard's visit, the tap room, or beer room, had been let to a prisoner who was living "within the rules" or "within the liberty" of the King's Bench prison; this meant that he was a King's Bench inmate who, for a fee, was allowed to live outside, within a certain radius of the prison. Although legislation prohibited jailers from having a pecuniary interest in the sale of alcohol within their prisons, it was a rule that was completely ignored. Howard reported that, in the summer of 1775, 600 pots of beer were brought into the Marshalsea one Sunday from a public house, because the prisoners did not like the beer in the tap room.

=== Common side ===
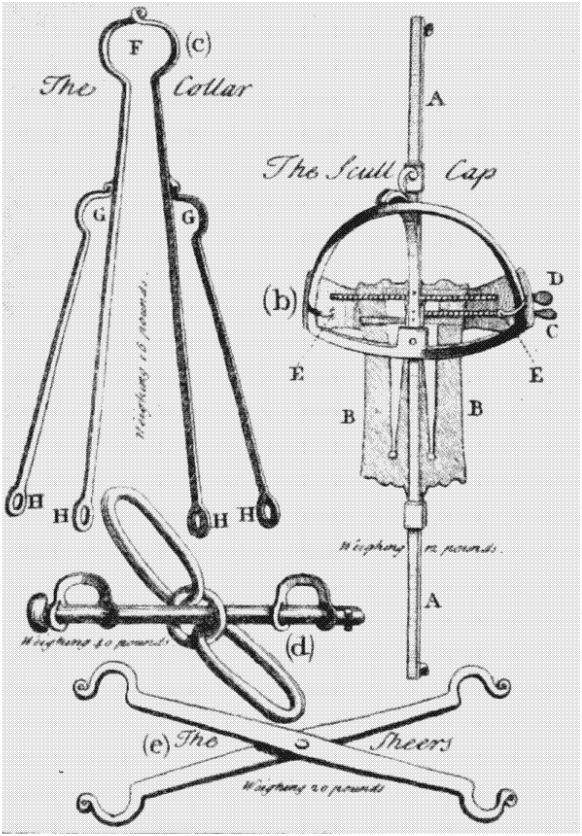
Instruments of torture used on prisoners, from a report by the Gaols Committee, 1729

Prisoners on the master's side rarely ventured to the common side. John Baptist Grano went there just once, on 5 August 1728, writing in his diary: "I thought it would have kill'd me." There was no need for other prisoners to see it, John Ginger writes. It was enough that they knew it existed to keep the rental money, legal fees and other gratuities flowing from their families, fees that anywhere else would have seen them living in the lap of luxury, but which in the Marshalsea could be trusted merely to stave off disease and starvation.

By all accounts, living conditions in the common side were horrific. In 1639 prisoners complained that 23 women were being held in one room without space to lie down, leading to a revolt, with prisoners pulling down fences and attacking the guards with stones. Prisoners were regularly beaten with a "bull's pizzle" (a whip made from a bull's penis), or tortured with thumbscrews and a skullcap, a vice for the head that weighed 12 pounds (5.4 kg).

What often finished them off was being forced to lie in the strong room, a windowless shed near the main sewer, next to piles of night soil and cadavers awaiting burial. Dickens described it as "dreaded by even the most dauntless highwaymen and bearable only to toads and rats". One apparently diabetic army officer who died in the strong room—he had been ejected from the common side because inmates had complained about the smell of his urine—had his face eaten by rats within hours of his death, according to a witness.

When William Acton ran the jail in the 1720s, the income from charities, collected to buy food for inmates on the common side, was directed instead to a group of trusted prisoners who policed the prison on Acton's behalf. The same group swore during Acton's trial in 1729 for murder that the strong room was the best room in the house. Ginger writes that Acton and his wife, who lived in a comfortable apartment near the lodge, knew they were sitting on a powder keg: "When each morning the smell of freshly baked bread filled ... the yard ... only brutal suppression could prevent the Common Side from erupting."

=== 1729 Gaols Committee ===
The common side did erupt after a fashion in 1728 when Robert Castell, an architect and debtor in the Fleet prison, who had been living in lodgings outside the jail within the rules, was taken to a "sponging house" after refusing to pay a higher prison fee to the Fleet's notorious warden, Thomas Bambridge. Sponging houses were private lodgings where prisoners were incarcerated before being taken to jail; they acquired the name because they squeezed the prisoner's last money out of him. When Castell arrived at the sponging house on 14 November he was forced to share space with a man who was dying of smallpox, as a result of which he became infected and died less than a month later.

Castell had a friend, James Oglethorpe, a Tory MP who years later founded the American colony of Georgia. Oglethorpe began to ask questions about the treatment of debtor prisoners, and a group of debtors, perhaps at Oglethorpe's instigation, lodged a complaint about their treatment with the Lord Mayor of London and his aldermen, who interviewed the Fleet's warden on 21 December 1728.

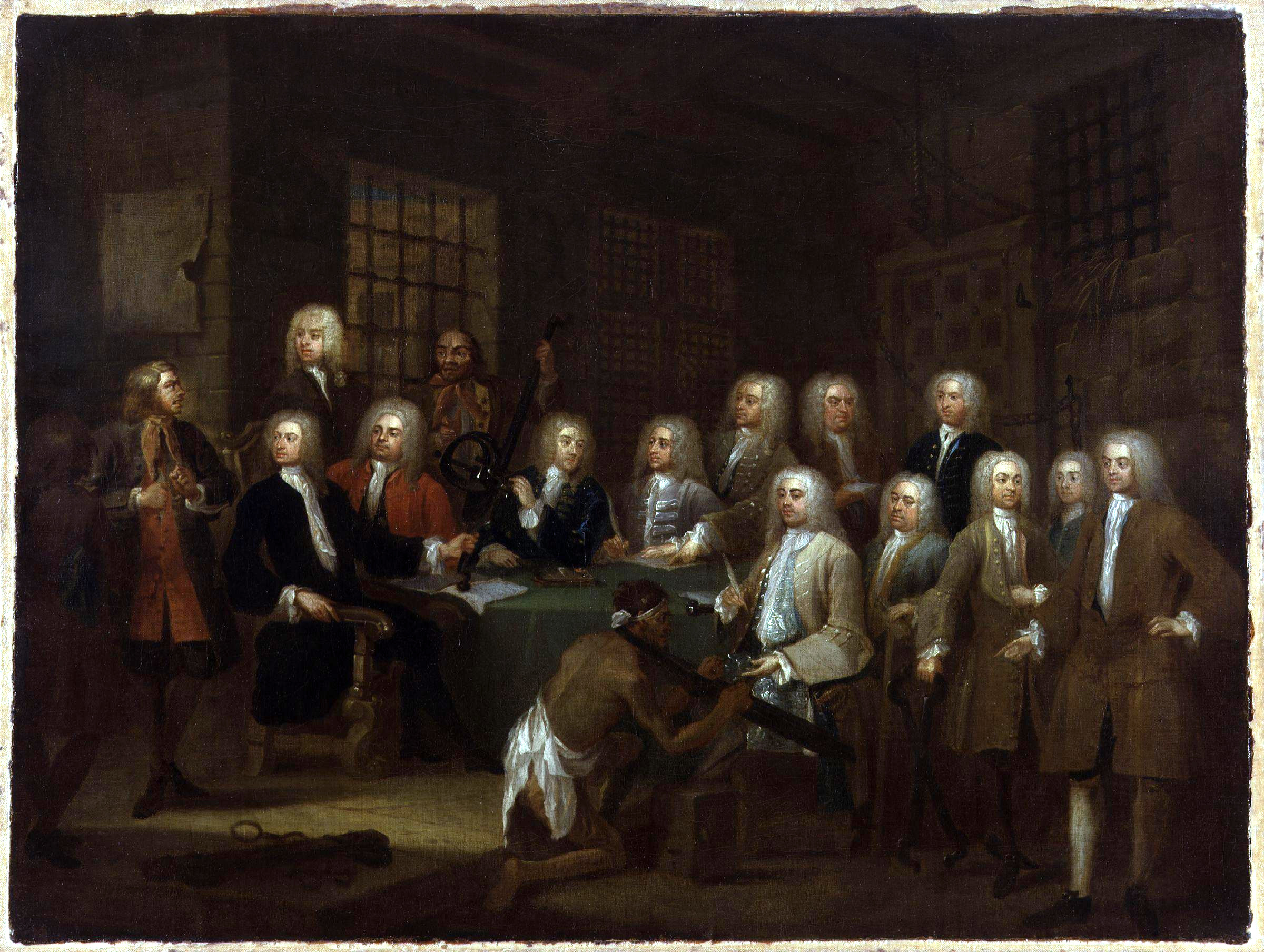
The Gaols Committee of the House of Commons (c. 1729) by William Hogarth. James Oglethorpe MP (seated far left) questions Thomas Bambridge, the Fleet's warden (standing far left). (Note: The painting was commissioned by Sir Archibald Grant, MP for Aberdeenshire, believed to be standing third from the right in the foreground. Sir John Perceval, first earl of Egmont, sits two chairs to the right of Oglethorpe. He later became president of the Georgia Trustees.) Horace Walpole wrote in 1749: "The scene is the committee. On the table are the instruments of torture. A prisoner in rags, half-starved, appears before them. The poor man has a good countenance, that adds to the interest. On the other hand is the inhuman gaoler. It is the very figure that Salvator Rosa would have drawn for Iago in the moment of detection."

In February 1729 the House of Commons appointed a parliamentary committee, the Gaols Committee, chaired by Oglethorpe, to examine conditions in the Fleet and Marshalsea. The committee visited the Fleet on 27 February and the Marshalsea on 25 March. William Hogarth accompanied the committee on its visit to the Fleet, sketching it, then painting it in oil (left). The painting was commissioned by Sir Archibald Grant, MP for Aberdeenshire, standing third from the right. The man in irons is thought to be Jacob Mendez Solas, a Portuguese prisoner.

The committee was shocked by the prisoners' living conditions. In the Fleet they found Sir William Rich, a baronet, in irons. Unable to pay the prison fee, he had been burned with a red-hot poker, hit with a stick and kept in a dungeon for ten days for having wounded the warden with a shoemaker's knife. In the Marshalsea they found that prisoners on the common side were being routinely starved to death:

All the Support such poor Wretches have to subsist on, is an accidental Allowance of Pease, given once a week by a Gentleman, who conceals his Name, and about Thirty Pounds of Beef, provided by the voluntary Contribution of the Judge and Officers of the Marshalsea, on Monday, Wednesday, and Friday; which is divided into very small Portions, of about an Ounce and a half, distributed with One-Fourth-part of an Half-penny Loaf ...

When the miserable Wretch hath worn out the Charity of his Friends, and consumed the Money, which he hath raised upon his Cloaths, and Bedding, and hath eat his last Allowance of Provisions, he usually in a few Days grows weak, for want of Food, with the symptoms of a hectick Fever; and when he is no longer able to stand, if he can raise 3d to pay the Fee of the common Nurse of the Prison, he obtains the Liberty of being carried into the Sick Ward, and lingers on for about a Month or two, by the assistance of the above-mentioned Prison Portion of Provision, and then dies.

=== Trial of William Acton ===
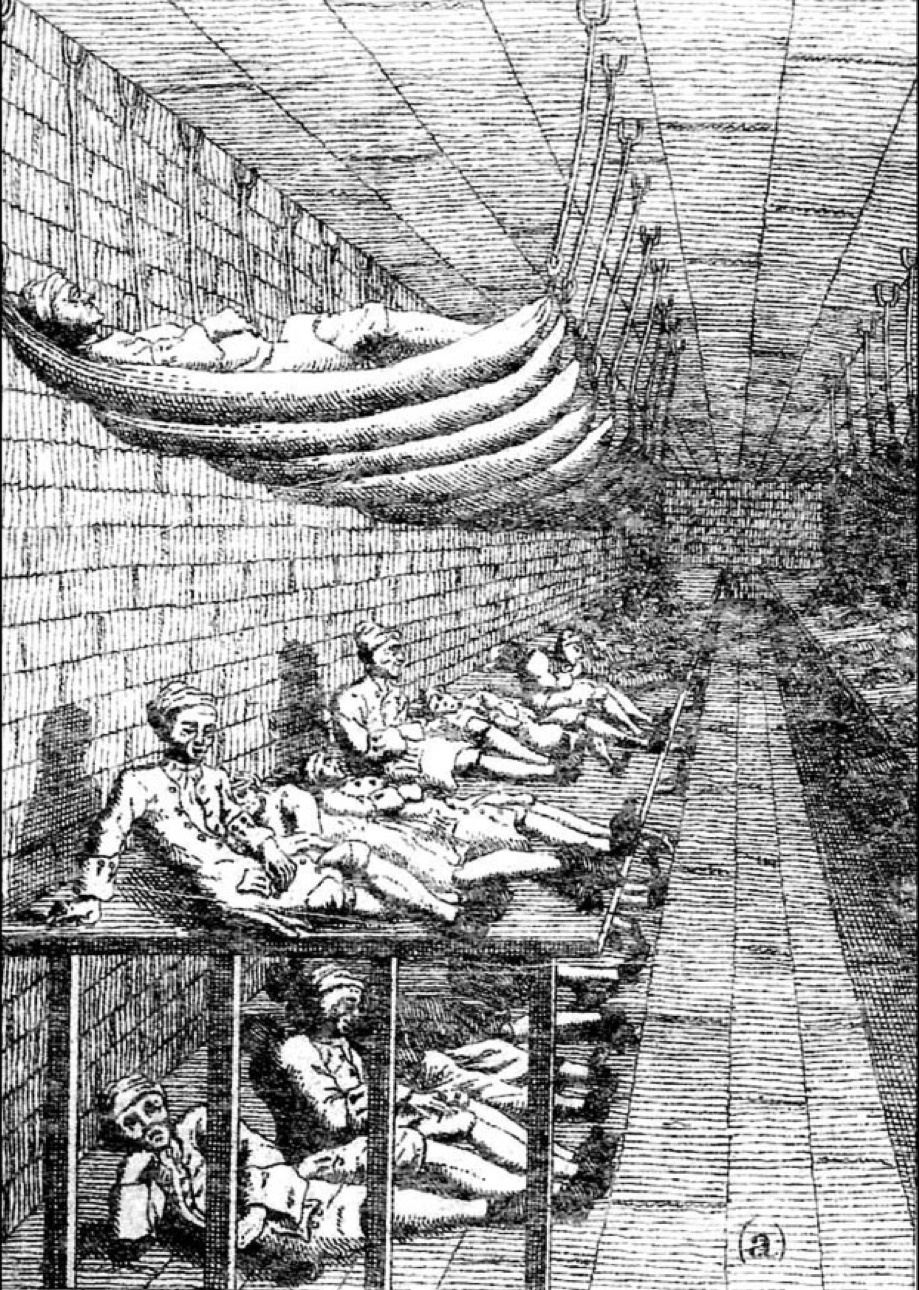
The men's sick ward in the Marshalsea, Gaols Committee, 1729: "For along the Side of the Walls of that Ward, Boards were laid upon Trestles, like a Dresser in a Kitchen; and under them, between those Trestles, were laid on the Floor, one Tire [tier] of sick Men, and upon the Dresser another Tire, and over them hung a Third Tire in Hammocks."

As a result of the Gaols Committee's inquiries, several key figures within the jails were tried for murder in August 1729, including Thomas Bambridge of the Fleet and William Acton of the Marshalsea. Given the strongly worded report of the Gaols Committee, the trials were major public events. Ginger writes that, when the Prince of Wales's bookseller presented his bill at the end of that year, two of the 41 volumes on it were accounts of William Acton's trial.

==== Case of Thomas Bliss ====
The first case against Acton, before Mr. Baron Carter, was for the murder in 1726 of Thomas Bliss, a carpenter and debtor. Unable to pay the prison fees, Bliss had been left with so little to eat that he had tried to escape by throwing a rope over the wall, but his pursuers severed it and he fell 20 feet into the prison yard. Wanting to know who had supplied the rope, Acton beat him with a bull's pizzle, stamped on his stomach, placed him in the hole (a damp space under the stairs), then in the strong room.

Originally built to hold pirates, the strong room was just a few yards from the prison's sewer. It was never cleaned, had no drain, no sunlight, no fresh air—the smell was described as "noisome"—and was full of rats and sometimes "several barrow fulls of dung". Several prisoners told the court that it contained no bed, so that prisoners had to lie on the damp floor, possibly next to corpses awaiting burial. But a group of favoured prisoners Acton had paid to police the jail told the hearing there was indeed a bed. One of them said he often chose to lie in there himself, because the strong room was so clean; the "best room on the Common side of the jail", said another. This despite the court's having heard that one prisoner's left side had mortified from lying on the wet floor, and that a rat had eaten the nose, ear, cheek and left eye of another.

Bliss was left in the strong room for three weeks wearing a skullcap (a heavy vice for the head), thumb screws, iron collar, leg irons, and irons round his ankles called sheers. One witness said the swelling in his legs was so bad that the irons on one side could no longer be seen for overflowing flesh. His wife, who was able to see him through a small hole in the door, testified that he was bleeding from the mouth and thumbs. He was given a small amount of food but the skullcap prevented him from chewing; he had to ask another prisoner, Susannah Dodd, to chew his meat for him. He was eventually released from the prison, but his health deteriorated and he died in St. Thomas's Hospital.

==== Other cases, acquittal ====
The court was told of three other cases. Captain John Bromfield, Robert Newton and James Thompson all died after similar treatment from Acton: a beating, followed by time in the hole or strong room, before being moved to the sick ward, where they were left to lie on the floor in leg irons.

So concerned was Acton for his reputation that he requested the indictments be read out in Latin, but his worries were misplaced. The government wanted an acquittal to protect the good name of the Knight Marshal, Sir Philip Meadows, who had hired John Darby as prison governor, who in turn had leased the prison to Acton. Acton's favoured prisoners had testified on his behalf, introducing contradictory evidence that the trial judge stressed to the jury. A stream of witnesses spoke of his good character, including a judge, an MP, his butcher, brewer, confectioner and solicitor—his coal merchant thought Acton "improper for the post he was in from his too great compassion"—and he was found not guilty on all charges. The Gaols Committee had managed to draw attention to the plight of England's prisoners, but reform had eluded them.

=== Notable prisoners ===
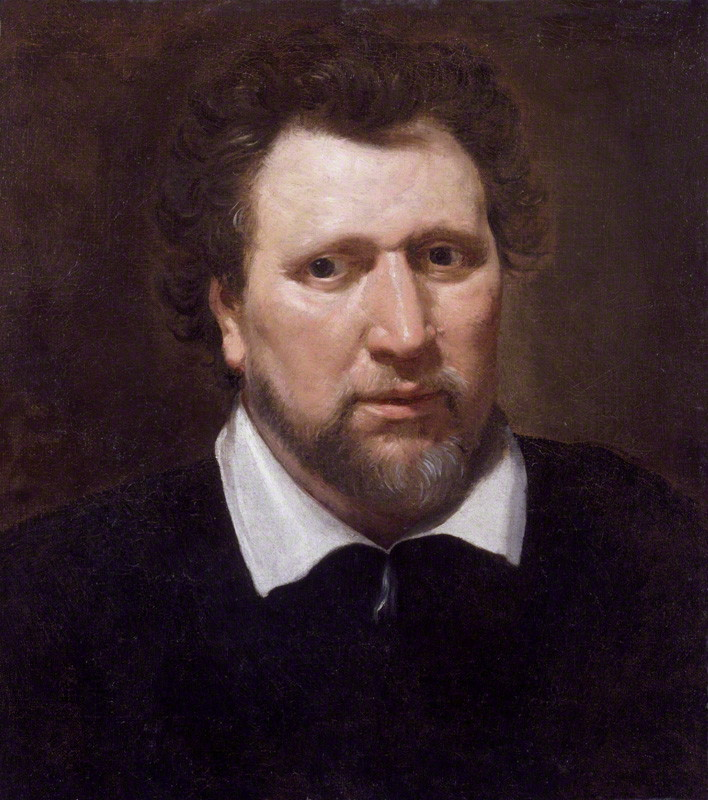
Ben Jonson was sent to the Marshalsea in 1597 for his play The Isle of Dogs.

Although most Marshalsea prisoners were debtors, the prison was second in importance only to the Tower of London. From the 14th century onwards, minor political figures were held there instead of in the Tower, mostly for sedition. William Hepworth Dixon wrote in 1885 that it was full of "poets, pirates, parsons, plotters; coiners, libellers, defaulters, Jesuits; vagabonds of every class who vexed the souls of men in power ..." During the Elizabethan era, it became the main holding prison for Roman Catholics suspected of sedition. Bishop Bonner, the last Roman Catholic Bishop of London, was imprisoned there in 1559, supposedly for his own safety, until his death 10 years later. William Herle, a spy for Lord Burghley, Elizabeth I's chief adviser, was held there in 1570 and 1571. According to historian Robyn Adams, the prison leaked both physically and metaphorically; in correspondence about Marshalsea prisoners suspected of involvement in a 1571 plot to kill the Queen, Herle wrote of a network within the prison for smuggling information out of it, which included hiding letters in holes in the crumbling brickwork for others to pick up.

Intellectuals regularly found themselves in the Marshalsea. The playwright Ben Jonson, a friend of Shakespeare, was jailed in 1597 for his play The Isle of Dogs, which was immediately suppressed, with no extant copies; on 28 July that year the Privy Council was told it was a "lewd plaie that was plaied in one of the plaie houses on the Bancke Side, contaynynge very seditious and sclandrous matter". The poet Christopher Brooke was jailed in 1601 for helping 17-year-old Ann More marry John Donne without her father's consent. George Wither, the political satirist, wrote his poem "The Shepherds Hunting" in 1614 in the Marshalsea; he was held for four months for libel over his Abuses Stript and Whipt (1613), 20 satires criticizing revenge, ambition and lust, one of them directed at the Lord Chancellor.

Nicholas Udall, vicar of Braintree and headmaster of Eton College, was sent there in 1541 for buggery and suspected theft; his appointment in 1555 as headmaster of Westminster School suggests that the episode did his name no lasting harm. Irish nobles Brian O'Connor Faly, Baron Offaly, and Giolla Pádraig O'More, Lord of Laois, were imprisoned there in November 1548. O'More died in the Marshalsea - O'Connor Faly was later moved to the Tower. Thomas Drury was sent to the Marshalsea on 15 July 1591, charged with "diuerse greate and fonde matters"; Drury was involved in 1593 with the allegation of atheism against the playwright Christopher Marlowe. In 1629 the jurist John Selden was jailed there for his involvement in drafting the Petition of Right, a document limiting the actions of the King, regarded as seditious although it had been passed by Parliament. When Sir John Eliot, Vice-Admiral of Devon, was moved to the Marshalsea in 1632 from the Tower of London for questioning the right of the King to tax imports and exports, he described it as leaving his palace in London for his country house in Southwark. Colonel Thomas Culpeper ended up in the Marshalsea in 1685 or 1687 for striking the Duke of Devonshire, William Cavendish, on the ear.

== Second Marshalsea (1811–1842) ==
=== Overview ===
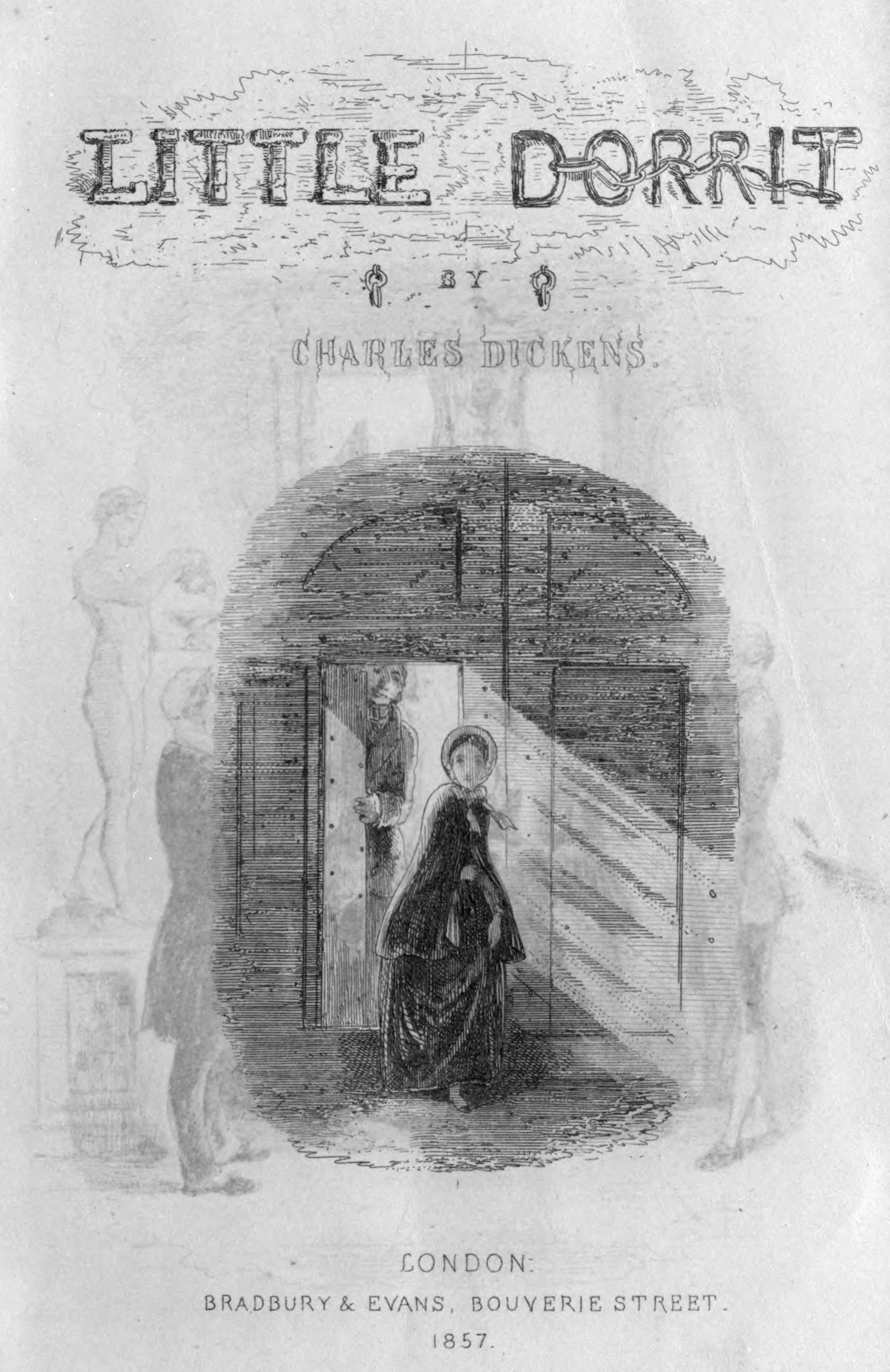
The original title page of Charles Dickens's Little Dorrit shows Amy leaving the Marshalsea.

When the prison reformer James Neild visited the first Marshalsea in December 1802, just 34 debtors were living there, along with eight wives and seven children. Neild wrote that it was in "a most ruinous and insecure state, and the habitations of the debtors wretched in the extreme". There had been riots in the prison in 1749 and 1768. The government acknowledged in 1799 that it had fallen into a state of decay, and a decision was made to rebuild it 130 yards south (119 m), at 150 High Street (now called Borough High Street), on the site of the White Lion prison, also known as the Borough Gaol. (Note: London Footprints: "[The White Lion] had been an inn prior to 1535 and became the Sheriff's Prison in 1540. The Surrey County, started in 1513, moved to the site in 1580 and a Bridewell of 1601 in 1654. The Bridewell, or House of Correction, had a chapel of 1661 which was later rebuilt in 1723. It closed in 1666 when prisoners were moved to the (Old) Marshalsea. The Surrey County was transferred to Horsemonger Lane in 1799.") This was on the south side of Angel Court and Angel Alley, two narrow streets that no longer exist. (Note: This has led to confusion because there is an alley called Angel Place to the north of what remains of the southern prison wall. The current Angel Place was part of the site of the Marshalsea prison. See Richard Horwood's 18th-century map, which shows Angel Court/Angel Alley near the Borough Goal [sic], marked by the number 2.) Costing £8,000 to complete (equivalent to £600,000 in 2025) the new prison opened in 1811 with two sections, one for Admiralty prisoners under court martial, and one for debtors, with a shared chapel that had been part of the White Lion.

=== Sources ===
James Neild visited the Marshalsea again during the first year of the new building's existence, publishing a description of it in 1812. This was supplemented by reports from the Committees and Commissioners on the State and Management of Prisons in London and Elsewhere, published between 1815 and 1818. More material is available in a pamphlet, An Expose of the Practice of the Palace, or Marshalsea Court, written in 1833 by an anonymous eyewitness.

Although the first Marshalsea survived for 500 years, and the second for just 38, it is the latter that became widely known, thanks largely to Charles Dickens, whose father, John Dickens, was sent there on 20 February 1824, under the Insolvent Debtor's Act 1813. He owed a baker, James Kerr, £40 and 10 shillings, a sum equivalent to £3,844 in 2025. Twelve years old at the time, Dickens was sent to live in lodgings with Mrs. Ellen Roylance in Little College Street, Camden Town, from where he walked five miles (8 km) every day to Warren's blacking factory at 30 Hungerford Stairs, a factory owned by a relative of his mother's. He spent 10 hours a day wrapping bottles of shoe polish for six shillings a week to pay for his keep.

His mother, Elizabeth Barrow, and her three youngest children joined her husband in the Marshalsea in April 1824. Dickens would visit them every Sunday until he found lodgings in Lant Street, closer to the prison, in the attic of a house belonging to the vestry clerk of St George's Church. This meant he was able to breakfast with his family in the Marshalsea and dine with them after work. His father was released after three months, on 28 May 1824, but the family's financial situation remained poor and Dickens had to continue working at the factory, something for which he reportedly never forgave his mother. Years later he wrote about the Marshalsea and other debtors' prisons in The Pickwick Papers (1836–1837), David Copperfield (1849–1850), and most extensively in Little Dorrit (1855–1857), whose main character, Amy, is born in the Marshalsea. Trey Philpotts writes that every detail about the Marshalsea in Little Dorrit reflects the real prison of the 1820s. According to Philpotts, Dickens rarely made mistakes and did not exaggerate; if anything, he downplayed the licentiousness of Marshalsea life, perhaps to protect Victorian sensibilities. (Note: Philpotts writes that the only discrepancies are that William Dorrit would have had to move in 1811 from the first to the second Marshalsea, and that Dickens locates the chandler's shop in the tap room, whereas a floor plan locates it in the female debtors' house.)

=== Debtors ===
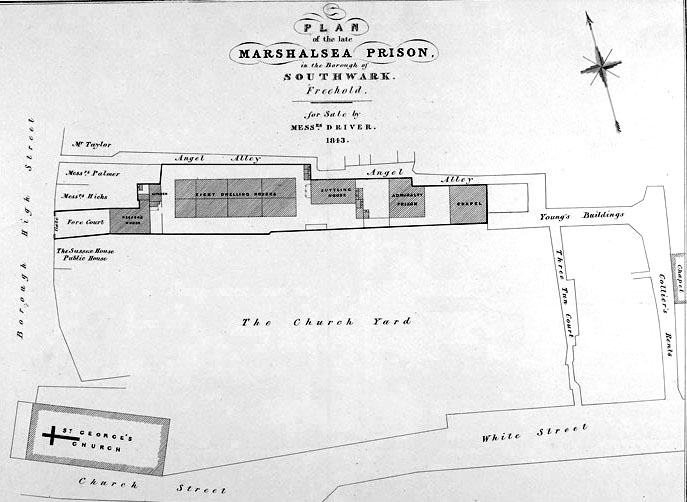
This plan of the second Marshalsea was drawn up in 1842 when it was closed; see clickable version.

Like the first Marshalsea, the second was notoriously cramped. In 1827, 414 out of its 630 debtors were there for debts under £20; 1,890 people in Southwark were imprisoned that year for a total debt of £16,442. The debtors' section consisted of a brick barracks, a yard measuring 177 ft × 56 ft (54 m × 17 m), a kitchen, a public room, and a tap room or snuggery, where debtors could drink as much beer as they wanted, at fivepence a pot in 1815. (Note: Neild wrote that the tap room consisted of two rooms, not one as Dickens wrote.) Philpotts reports that, by the early 19th century, most debtors spent only months in the prison; on 19 April 1826 it held 105 debtors, 99 of whom had been there for less than six months and the other six for less than a year.

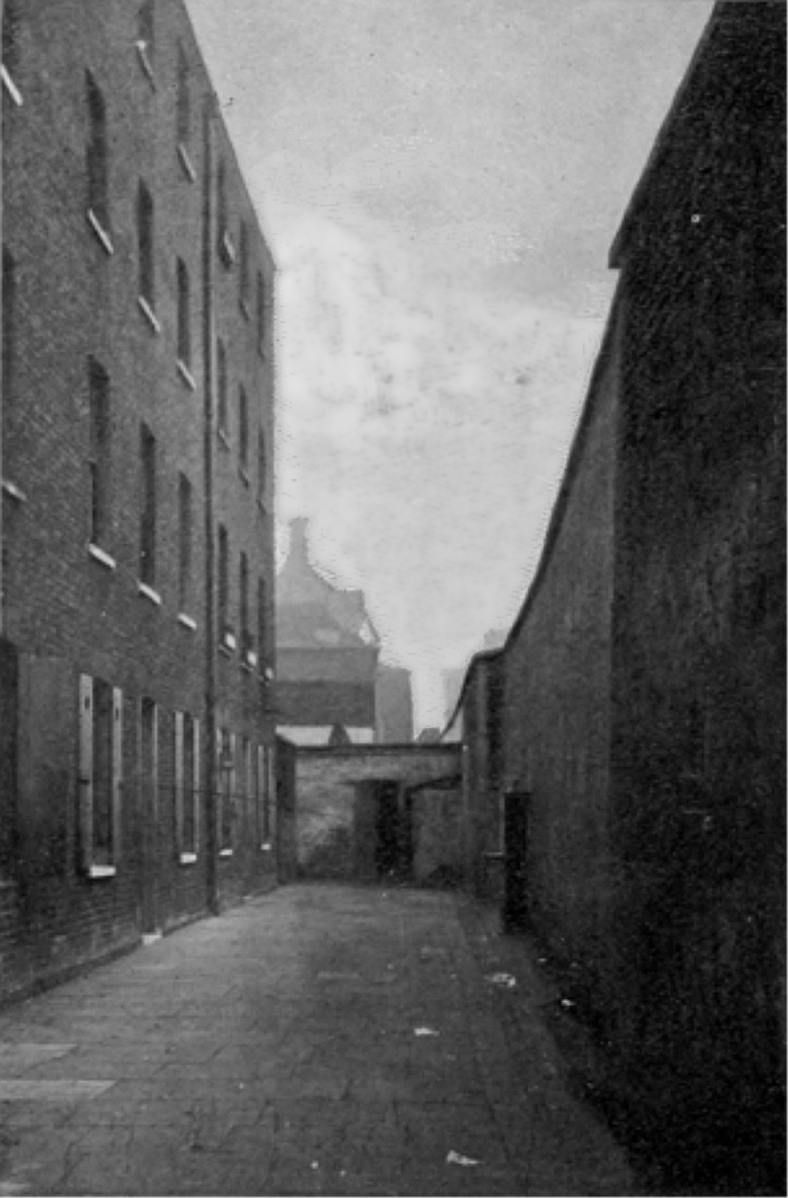
Prison courtyard, c. 1897, when the buildings were being let as rooms and shops. (Note: Sir Walter Besant: "I think it was in the year 1877 or 1878 or thereabouts that I walked over to see the Marshalsea before it was pulled down. I found a long narrow terrace of mean houses—they are still standing: there was a narrow courtyard in front for exercise and air: a high wall separated the prison from the Churchyard: the rooms in the terrace were filled with deep cupboards on either side of the fireplace: these cupboards contained the coals, the cooking utensils, the stores, and the clothes of the occupants. My guide [...] pointed to certain marks on the floor as, he said, the place where they fastened the staples when they tied down the poor prisoners.")

The barracks was less than 10 yards (9.1 m) wide and 33 yards (30 m) long and was divided into eight houses, each with three floors, containing 56 rooms in all. Each floor had seven rooms facing the front and seven in the back. There were no internal hallways. The rooms were accessed directly from the outside via eight narrow wooden staircases, a fire hazard given that the stairs provided the sole exit and the houses were separated only by thin lathe and plaster partitions.

Women debtors were housed in rooms over the tap room. The rooms in the barracks (the men's rooms) were 10 ft 10 in (3.30 m) square and 8–9 ft (2.4–2.7 m) high, with a window, wooden floors and a fireplace. Each housed two or three prisoners, and as the rooms were too small for two beds, prisoners had to share. Apart from the bed, prisoners were expected to provide their own furniture. An anonymous witness complained in 1833:

170 persons have been confined at one time within these walls, making an average of more than four persons in each room—which are not ten feet square!!! I will leave the reader to imagine what the situation of men, thus confined, particularly in the summer months, must be.

Much of the prison business was run by a debtors' committee of nine prisoners and a chair (a position held by Dickens' father). Appointed on the last Wednesday of each month, and meeting every Monday at 11 am, the committee was responsible for imposing fines for rules violations, an obligation they met with enthusiasm. Debtors could be fined for theft; throwing water or filth out of windows or into someone else's room; making noise after midnight; cursing, fighting or singing obscene songs; smoking in the beer room from 8–10 am and 12–2 pm; defacing the staircase; dirtying the privy seats; stealing newspapers or utensils from the snuggery; urinating in the yard; drawing water before it had boiled; and criticizing the committee.

We are quiet here; we don't get badgered here; there's no knocker, sir, to be hammered at by creditors and bring a man's heart into his mouth. Nobody comes here to ask if a man's at home, and to say he'll stand on the door mat till he is. Nobody writes threatening letters about money to this place. It's freedom, sir, it's freedom! [...] we have got to the bottom, we can't fall, and what have we found? Peace.

— Dr. Haggage in Little Dorrit

As dreadful as the Marshalsea was, it kept the creditors away. Debtors could even arrange to have themselves arrested by a business partner to enter the jail when it suited them. Historian Margot Finn writes that discharge was therefore used as a punishment; one debtor was thrown out in May 1801 for "making a Noise and disturbance in the prison".

=== Garnish and chummage ===
Upon arrival, new prisoners were expected to pay garnish, a donation to the prisoners' committee. When the commissioners reported to Parliament between 1815 and 1818, male prisoners were paying five shillings and sixpence, increased to eight shillings and sixpence by the time the anonymous witness was writing in 1833. Women were asked for a smaller sum. The fee allowed prisoners to use the snuggery, where water could be boiled and meals cooked, and candles and newspapers obtained. Prisoners failing to pay were declared defaulters by the prison crier, had their names written up in the kitchen, and were sent to Coventry.

After paying garnish, prisoners were given a "chum ticket", which told them which room was theirs and which prisoners they would be chumming with. They would often spend the first night in the infirmary until a room could be made ready, and sometimes three or four nights walking around the yard before a chum could be found, although they were already being charged for the room they did not have.

According to Dickens specialist Trey Philpotts, the newest arrival was usually placed with the youngest prisoner who was living alone. A wealthier prisoner could pay his roommate to go away—"buy out the chum"—for half-a-crown a week in 1818, while the outcast chum would sleep in the tap room or find another room to rent in the prison. The only prisoners not expected to pay chummage were debtors who had declared themselves insolvent by swearing an oath that they had assets worth less than 40 shillings. If their creditors agreed, they could be released after 14 days, but if anyone objected, they remained confined to the poor side of the building, near the women's side, receiving a small weekly allowance from the county and money from charity.

=== Admiralty prisoners ===
The Admiralty division housed a few prisoners under naval courts-martial for mutiny, desertion, piracy, and what the deputy marshal preferred in 1815 to call "unnatural crimes", a euphemism for sex between men. Unlike other parts of the prison that had been built from scratch in 1811, the Admiralty division—as well as the northern boundary wall, the dayroom and the chapel—had been part of the old Borough gaol and were considerably run down. The cells were so rotten they were barely able to confine the prisoners; in 1817 one actually broke through his cell walls. The low boundary wall meant that Admiralty prisoners were often chained to bolts fixed to the floor in the infirmary.

They were supposed to have a separate yard to exercise in, so that criminals were not mixing with debtors, but in fact the prisoners mixed often and happily, according to Dickens. The parliamentary committee deplored this practice, arguing that Admiralty prisoners were characterized by an "entire absence of all control", and were bound to have a bad effect on the debtors. The two groups would retreat to their own sections during inspections, Dickens wrote:

[T]he smugglers habitually consorted with the debtors [...] except at certain constitutional moments when somebody came from some Office, to go through some form of overlooking something, which neither he nor anybody else knew anything about. On those truly British occasions, the smugglers, if any, made a feint of walking into the strong cells and the blind alley, while this somebody pretended to do his something; and made a reality of walking out again as soon as he hadn't done it—neatly epitomizing the administration of most of the public affairs, in our right little, tight little island. (Note: The words "right little, tight little island" come from an 1841 song, "The Snug Little Island", by Thomas John Dibdin: Daddy Neptune one day to Freedom did say, "If ever I lived upon dry land. The spot I should hit on would be little Britain!" Says Freedom "Why that's my own little island!" Oh, it's a snug little island, A right little, tight little island, Search the globe round, none can be found So happy as this little island.)

=== Women ===
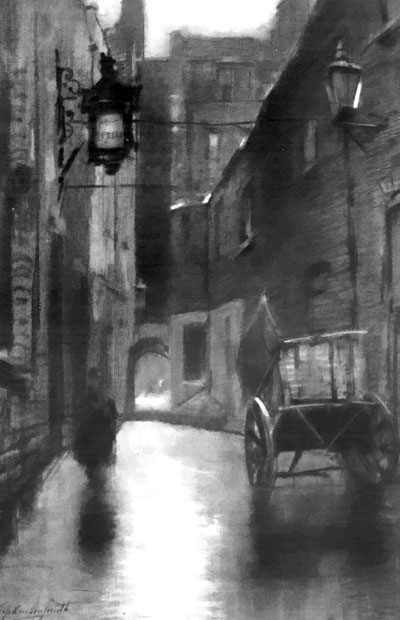
Painting of the Marshalsea in the early 1900s, after it had closed, by American artist Francis Hopkinson Smith. It was probably created when the artist visited London in 1913.

According to the anonymous eyewitness, women in the Marshalsea were in constant moral danger: "How often has female virtue been assailed in poverty? Alas how often has it fallen, in consequence of a husband or a father having been a prisoner for debt?" The prison doctor would visit every other day to attend to prisoners, and sometimes their children—to "protect his reputation", according to a doctor testifying in 1815 to a parliamentary commission—but would not attend to their wives. This left women to give birth alone or with the help of other prisoners. The doctor told the commission he had helped just once with a birth, and then only as a matter of courtesy, because it was not included in his salary.

The presence of wives, lovers and daughters was taken for granted. Visitors could come and go freely, and even live with the prisoners, without being asked who they were. Female prisoners were allowed to mix with the men. Some of the rooms were let to prostitutes. The prison gates were closed from ten at night until eight the next morning, with a bell warning visitors half an hour before closing time, and an officer walking around the prison calling, "Strangers, women and children all out!"

=== Closure and abolition ===
The Marshalsea was closed by an Act of Parliament (Public Act 5 & 6 Vict. c. 22) in 1842, and on 19 November that year the inmates were relocated to the Bethlem hospital if they were mentally ill, or to the King's Bench Prison, at that point renamed the Queen's Prison. On 31 December 1849 the Court of the Marshalsea of the Household of the Kings of England was abolished, and its power transferred to Her Majesty's Court of Common Pleas at Westminster.

The buildings and land were auctioned off in July 1843 and purchased for £5,100 by W. G. Hicks, an ironmonger. The property consisted of the keeper's house, the canteen (known as a suttling house), the Admiralty section, the chapel, a three-storey brick building and eight brick houses, all closed off from Borough High Street by iron gates. Imprisonment for debt was finally outlawed in England in 1869, except in cases of fraud or refusal to pay, and in the 1870s the Home Office demolished most of the prison buildings, though in 1955 parts of it were still in use by George Harding & Sons, hardware merchants.

Dickens visited what was left of the Marshalsea in May 1857, just before he finished Little Dorrit. He wrote in the preface:

Some of my readers may have an interest in being informed whether or no any portions of the Marshalsea Prison are yet standing. I did not know, myself, until the sixth of this present month, when I went to look. I found the outer front courtyard, often mentioned in this story, metamorphosed into a butter shop; and then I almost gave up every brick of the jail for lost. Wandering, however, down a certain adjacent "Angel Court, leading to Bermondsey", I came to "Marshalsea Place": the houses in which I recognised, not only as the great block of the former prison, but as preserving the rooms that arose in my mind's eye when I became Little Dorrit's biographer ...

A little further on, I found the older and smaller wall, which used to enclose the pent-up inner prison where nobody was put, except for ceremony. But, whosoever goes into Marshalsea Place, turning out of Angel Court, leading to Bermondsey, will find his feet on the very paving-stones of the extinct Marshalsea jail; will see its narrow yard to the right and to the left, very little altered if at all, except that the walls were lowered when the place got free; will look upon the rooms in which the debtors lived; and will stand among the crowding ghosts of many miserable years.

=== Location of prison remains ===
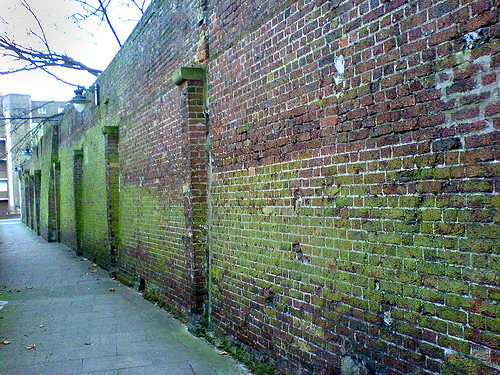
Remaining wall of the Marshalsea, 2007. The wall marked the prison's southern boundary.

The building on the site of the prison houses Southwark Council's John Harvard Library and Local Studies Library, at 211 Borough High Street, just north of the junction with Tabard Street. All that remains of the Marshalsea is the brick wall that marked the southern boundary of the prison, separating it from St George's churchyard, now a small garden. (Note: English Heritage: "SOUTHWARK TQ3279 BOROUGH HIGH STREET 636-1/5/104 (East side) 30 September 1977 Wall forming north boundary of public gardens, formerly St George's Churchyard (Formerly Listed as: BOROUGH HIGH STREET (East side) Wall to north of Public Gardens formerly St George's Churchyard) II Churchyard wall, now boundary wall to public gardens. C18 with early C19 and later alterations. Dull red brick, the top 9 courses in London Stocks, with flat stone coping, part missing. Brick buttresses to north. Runs east–west, forming northern boundary to public gardens, formerly churchyard. Approx 4m high. Curved rebate about half way along. To east of this a pair of later segment-headed openings contain C20 wrought-iron gates. Some small openings, blocked; much patching and reinforcing with tie rods. Enamel plaque over entrances inscribed: 'This site was originally the MARSHALSEA PRISON made famous by the late Charles Dickens in his work Little Dorrit'. The wall formed the southern boundary of the Marshalsea Prison, where Dickens's father was imprisoned.") It can be reached by underground on the Northern line to Borough tube station, or by train to London Bridge station.

The surviving wall runs along an alleyway that was part of the prison, now called Angel Place. The name Angel Place has led to confusion because there were two alleyways on the north side of the Marshalsea (Angel Court and Angel Alley), the first of which Dickens refers to when giving directions to the prison remains in 1857. See Richard Horwood's 18th-century map, which shows Angel Court/Angel Alley near the Borough Goal [sic], marked by the number 2.

The wall is marked on the garden side, on what would have been the external wall of the prison, by a plaque from the local council. There is also a paving stone with information about Dickens's father. The Cuming Museum has one of the prison's pumps and the Dickens House Museum one of its windows.

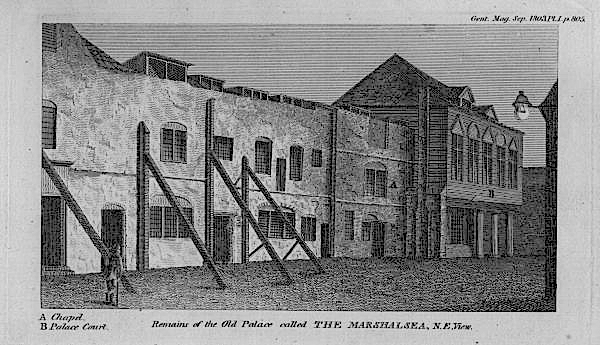
First Marshalsea, published 1803

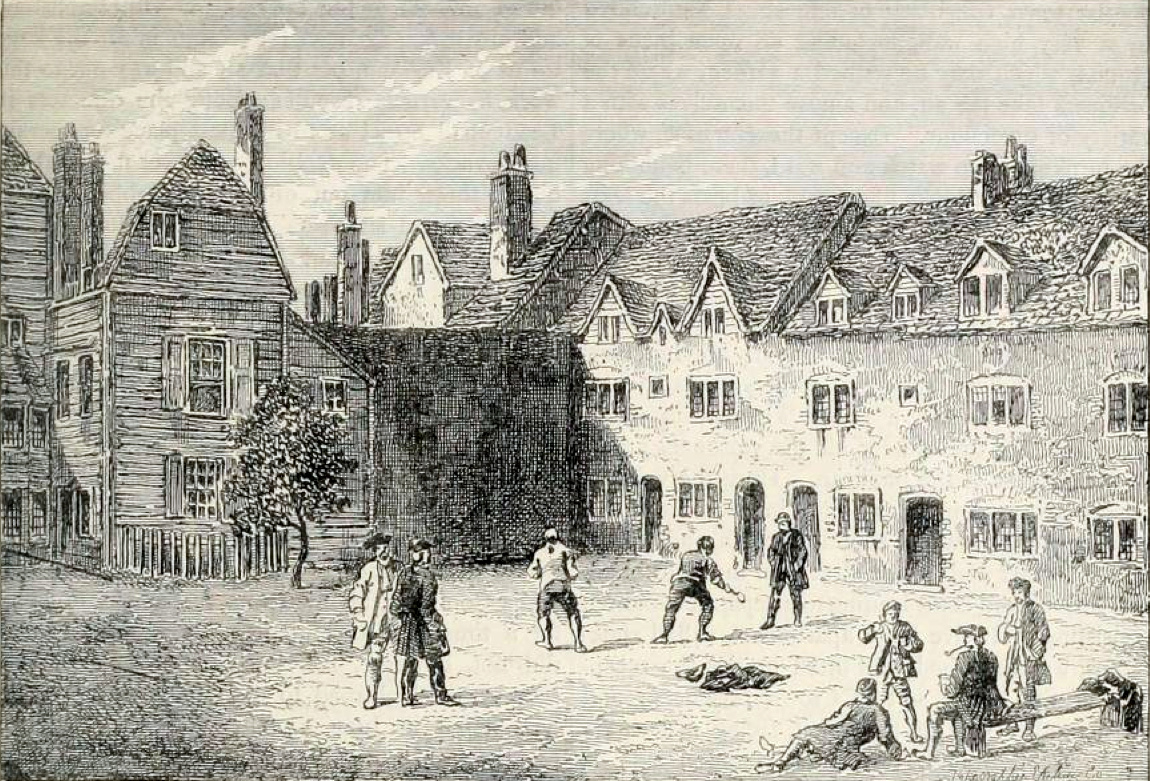
Court of the first Marshalsea, 1800

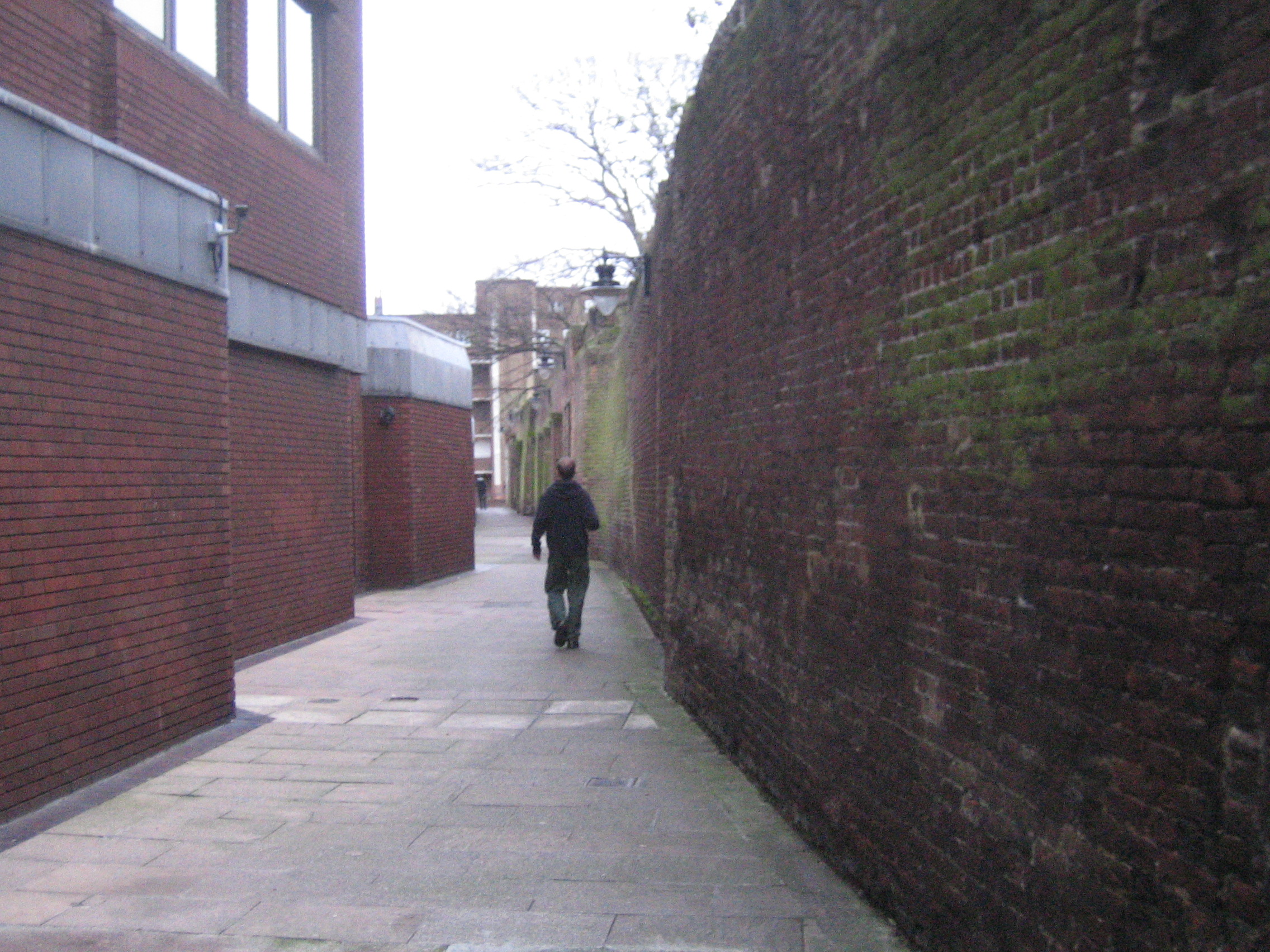
Second Marshalsea courtyard in 2007, then known as Angel Place; building on the left is a public library

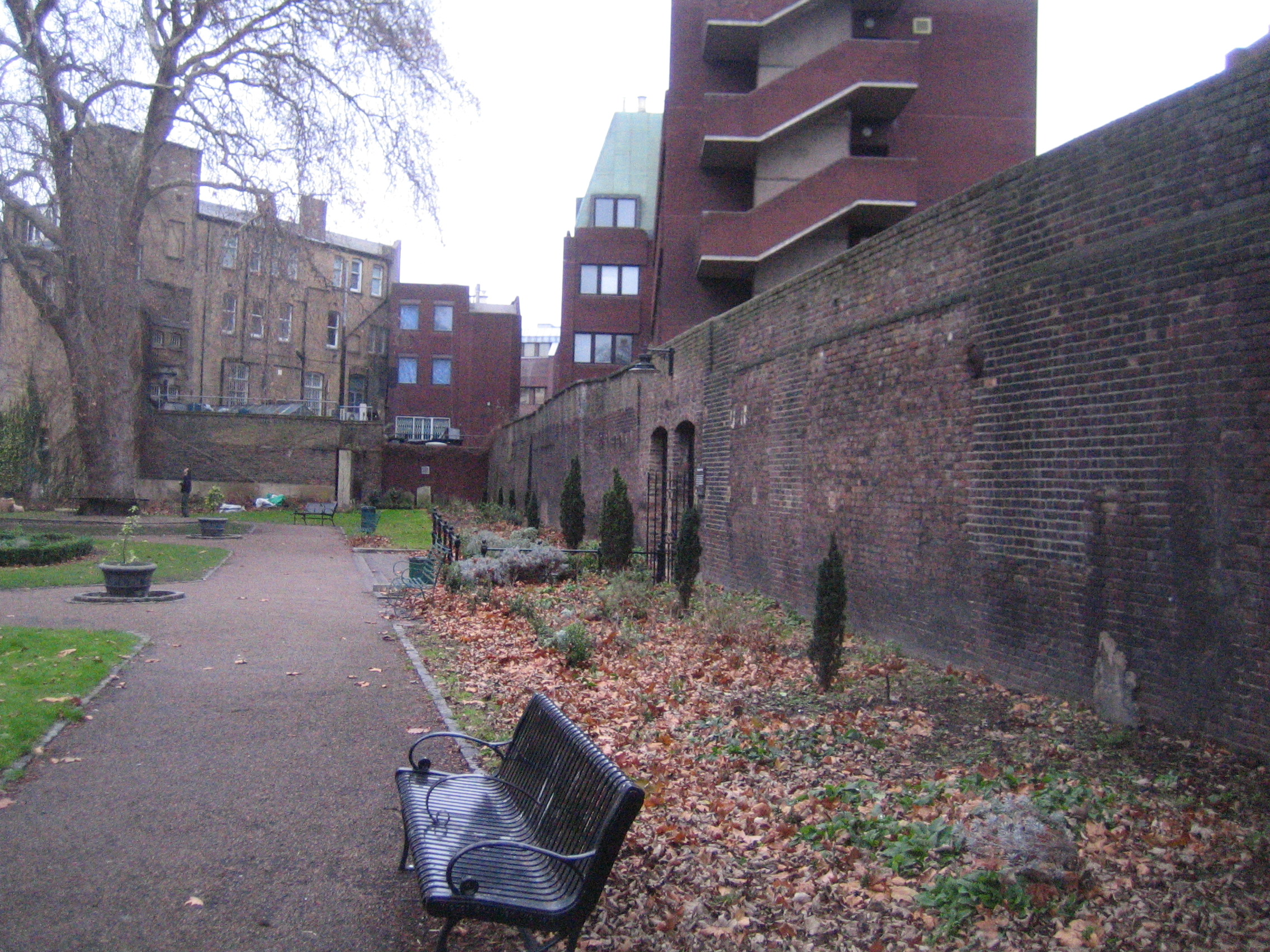
Remaining wall, 2007

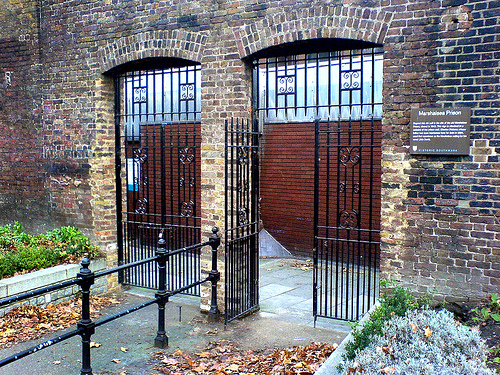
Remaining wall

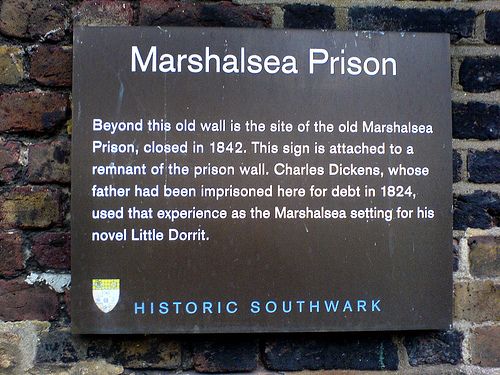
Plaque on the remaining wall

== See also ==
- Cross Bones
- Liberty of the Clink
- Marshalsea Road
- United Kingdom insolvency law

== Works cited ==
- Adams, Robyn (June 2009). "'The Service I am Here for': William Herle in the Marshalsea Prison, 1571", The Huntington Library Quarterly, 72(2), pp. 217–238. JSTOR 10.1525/hlq.2009.72.2.217
- Allingham, Philip V. (2004). "Where the Dickens: A Chronology of the Various Residences of Charles Dickens, 1812–1870", Victorian Web, 22 November 2004.
- An Eye-Witness (1833). An Expose of the Practice of the Palace, or Marshalsea Court. London: G. Berger. JSTOR 60209185.
- Ashton, John (1888). The Fleet: Its River, Prison, and Marriages. London: T. F. Unwin.
- Bain, Rodney M. (Spring 1989). "The Prison Death of Robert Castell and its Effect on the Founding of Georgia", The Georgia Historical Quarterly, 73(1), pp. 67–78. JSTOR 40581931
- Barty-King, Hugh (1991). The Worst Poverty: A History of Debt and Debtors. London: Alan Sutton Publishing.
- Besant, Walter. South London, London: Chatto & Windus, 1912.
- Brown, James Baldwin (1823). Memoirs of the Public and Private Life of John Howard, the Philanthropist, London: T. and G. Underwood.
- Brown, Roger Lee (1996). A History of the Fleet Prison, London, London: Edwin Mellen Press Limited.
- Carney, Jo Eldridge (2001). Renaissance and Reformation, 1500–1620: A Biographical Dictionary, Westport: Greenwood Publishing Group.
- Cave, Edward (Sylvanus Urban), Gentleman's Magazine (1803). "Old Palace of the Marshalsea, Southwark", reader's letter to Sylvanus Urban and reply, 8 September 1803.
- Cobbett, William (1813). Cobbett's Complete Collections of State Trials and Proceedings, Vol 17. London: R. Bagshaw.
- Cooper, Robert Alan (1976). "Ideas and Their Execution: English Prison Reform", Eighteenth-Century Studies, 10(1), Autumn 1976, pp. 73–93. JSTOR 2737818
- Darlington, Ida (ed.) (1955). "The Marshalsea", Survey of London, Volume 25.
- Dickens, Charles (1857). Little Dorrit, London: Bradbury and Evans.
- Dickens, Charles (1867). All the Year Round, Volume 18, London: Chapman and Hall.
- Dickens, Charles (1900) [1837]. The Posthumous Papers of the Pickwick Club, London: Thomas Nelson and Sons, Ltd.
- Dixon, William Hepworth (1856). John Howard, and the Prison-world of Europe, London: Robert Carter & Brothers.
- Dixon, William Hepworth (1885). Her Majesty's Tower, Volume 2, London: Bickers.
- English Heritage National Monuments Record. Remaining wall of the Marshalsea.
- Field, John (1850). The Life of John Howard: With Comments on His Character and Philanthropic Labours, London: Longman, Brown, Green, and Longmans.
- Finn, Margot (2007). The Character of Credit: Personal Debt in English Culture, 1740–1914, Cambridge: Cambridge University Press, 2007.
- Gaols Committee (14 May 1729). A Report from the Committee Appointed to enquire into the State of the Goals of this Kingdom. London: House of Commons.
- Grano, John Baptist (1998). Ginger, John (ed.). Handel's Trumpeter: The Diary of John Grano. Pendragon Press. ISBN 0945193963. (The diary was written 1728–1729 and obtained by the Bodleian library in Oxford in 1756.)
- Griffiths, Arthur (1884). The Chronicles of Newgate, Volume 1, Chapman and Hall.
- Hostettler, John (2009). A History of Criminal Justice in England, Waterside Press.
- Howard, John (1777). The State of the Prisons in England And Wales, Warrington.
- Hughes, Robert (1988). The Fatal Shore: The Epic of Australia's Founding, Vintage Books.
- Jones, W. R. (1970). "The Court of the Verge: The Jurisdiction of the Steward and Marshal of the Household in Later Medieval England", The Journal of British Studies, 10(1), November 1970. JSTOR 175225
- Knight, Charles (ed.) (1841). London, Volume 3, London: Charles Knight and Co.
- London Footprints. "Crime & Punishment". london-footprints.co.uk.
- McConville, Sean (1995). "The Victorian Prison: England (1865–1965)" in Norval Morris and David J. Rothman (eds.), Oxford History of the Prison, Oxford: Oxford University Press.
- McGowen, Randall (1995). "The Well-Ordered Prison: England, 1780–1865" in Norval Morris and David J. Rothman (eds.), Oxford History of the Prison, Oxford: Oxford University Press.
- McIntosh, Marjorie K. (1979). "Immediate Royal Justice: The Marshalsea Court in Havering, 1358", Speculum, 54(4), October. JSTOR 2850326
- Kendall, Roy (2003). Christopher Marlowe and Richard Baines: Journeys through the Elizabethan Underground. London: Associated University Presses.
- Neild, James (1802). An account of the rise, progress, and present state, of the Society for the Discharge and Relief of Persons Imprisoned for Small Debts. London: John Nichols and Son.
- Neild, James (1812). State of Prisons in England, Scotland and Wales, London: John Nichols and Son.
- Noorthouck, John (1773). "Book 3, Ch. 1: Southwark", A New History of London: Including Westminster and Southwark.
- Philpotts, Trey (Autumn 1991). "The Real Marshalsea". The Dickensian. 87 (3): 133–145.
- Philpotts, Trey (2003). The Companion to Little Dorrit. London: Helm Information Ltd. ISBN 1-873403-85-2.
- Pitofsky, Alex (2000). "The Warden's Court Martial: James Oglethorpe and the Politics of Eighteenth-Century Prison Reform", Eighteenth-Century Life, 24(1), Winter, pp. 88–102.
- Pritchard, Allan (November 1963). "Abuses Stript and Whipt and Wither's Imprisonment". The Review of English Studies. New Series. 14 (56): 337–345. doi:10.1093/res/XIV.56.337. JSTOR 513223.
- Riggs, David (2004). "Marlowe's life", in Patrick Cheney (ed.), The Cambridge Companion to Christopher Marlowe. Cambridge: Cambridge University Press, pp. 24–40.
- Scribner's Monthly (1881). "In London with Dickens", Volume 21, March 1881.
- Small, Helen (2004) [1998]. Appendix III in Charles Dickens, Little Dorrit, London: Penguin Classics, pp. 906–911.
- Tambling, Jeremy (2009). "New Prisons, New Criminals, New Masculinity: Dickens and Reade". In Lauterbach, Frank; Alber, Jan (eds.). Stones of Law, Bricks of Shame: Narrating Imprisonment in the Victorian Age. Toronto: University of Toronto Press.
- Thornbury, Walter (1872). Old and New London, Volume 1, London: Cassell, Petter, & Galpin.
- Vickers, Brian (2004). Shakespeare, Co-Author: A Historical Study of Five Collaborative Plays. Oxford: Oxford University Press.
- Wade, John (1829). A Treatise on the Police and Crimes of the Metropolis. London: Longman, Rees, Orme, Brown and Green.
- Walford, Edward (1878). 'Southwark: High Street' Old and New London, Volume 6.
- Walpole, Horace (1849). Anecdotes of Painting in England. London: Henry G. Bohn.
- West, Tessa (2011). The Curious Mr Howard: Legendary Prison Reformer. Waterside Press.
- Wheatley, Henry Benjamin, and Cunningham, Peter (1891). London, Past and Present: Its History, Associations, and Traditions. London: Scribner and Welford.
- White, Jerry (2009). "Pain and Degradation in Georgian London: Life in the Marshalsea Prison", History Workshop Journal, 68(1), Autumn, pp. 69–98. doi:10.1093/hwj/dbp011 JSTOR 40646165
- White, Jerry (2012). London in the Eighteenth Century: A Great and Monstrous Thing. London: Random House.
