= Cross Bones =

Disused burial ground in Southwark, London

Coordinates: 51.5042°N 0.093°W

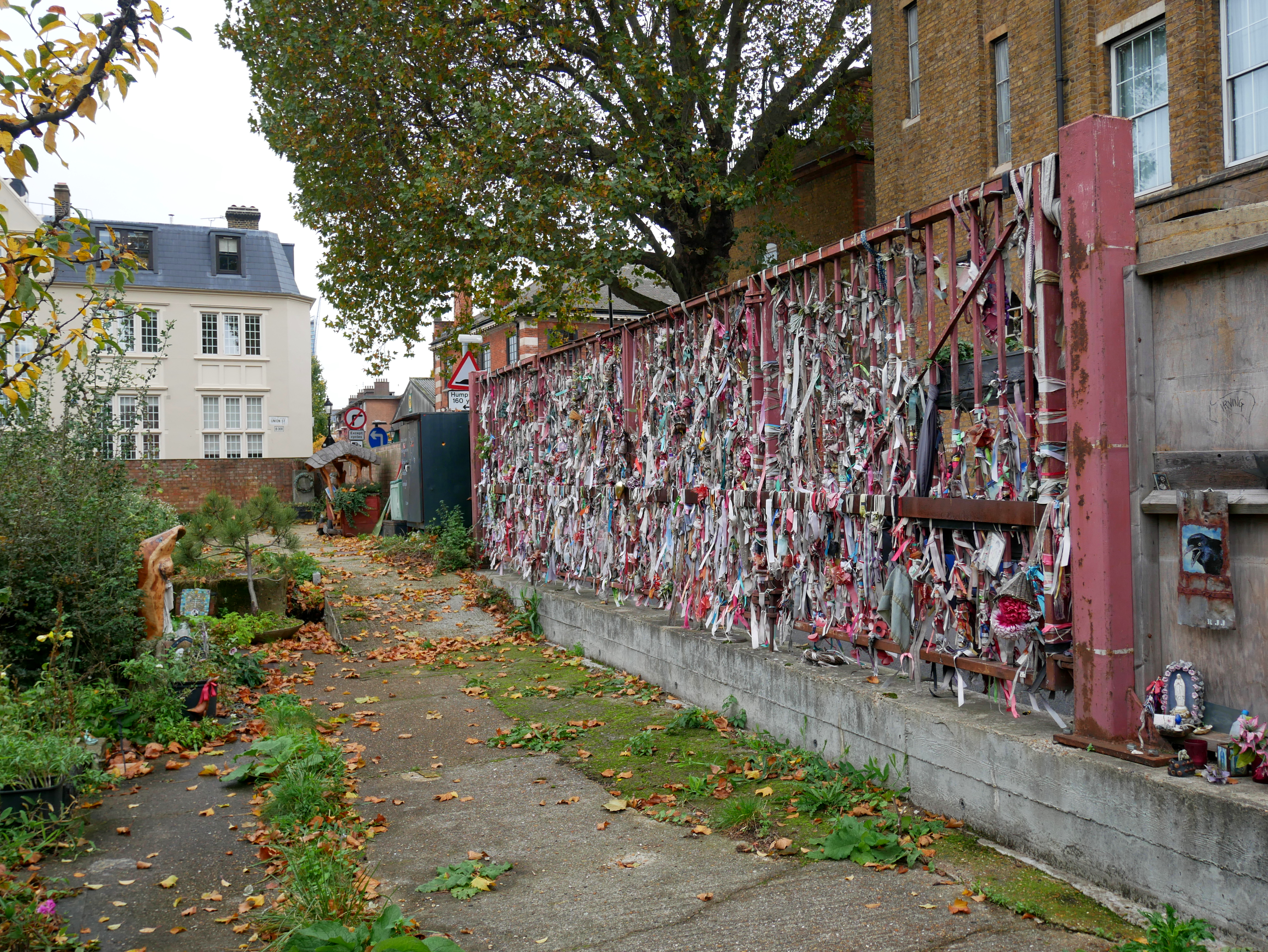
- An internal cemetery view of the Cross Bones gate
- Interactive map of Cross Bones

Details
- Established: 1598; 428 years ago (Earliest mention)
- Closed: 1853; 173 years ago
- Location: Redcross Way, Southwark, south London, SE1
- Country: England
- Type: Sex workers and paupers
- Owned by: Transport for London (as of 2014)
- No. of graves: Up to 15,000
- Website: crossbones.org.uk

Cross Bones (also known as Crossbones) is a disused post-medieval burial ground on Redcross Way in Southwark, South London.

Excavation reports state that "the ground is thought to have originally been established at least as early as the 17th century, as a single women's (prostitutes') cemetery. By 1769, it had become a paupers cemetery and remained so until its closure in 1853."

These women were also known locally as "Winchester Geese" because they were licensed by the Bishop of Winchester to work within the Liberty of the Clink, an area outside the jurisdiction of the City of London where brothels, theatres, bull baiting, bear baiting, and other activities not permitted within the city could be found.

As many as 15,000 people are believed to have been buried there before its closure in 1853.

== History ==
=== Origins ===
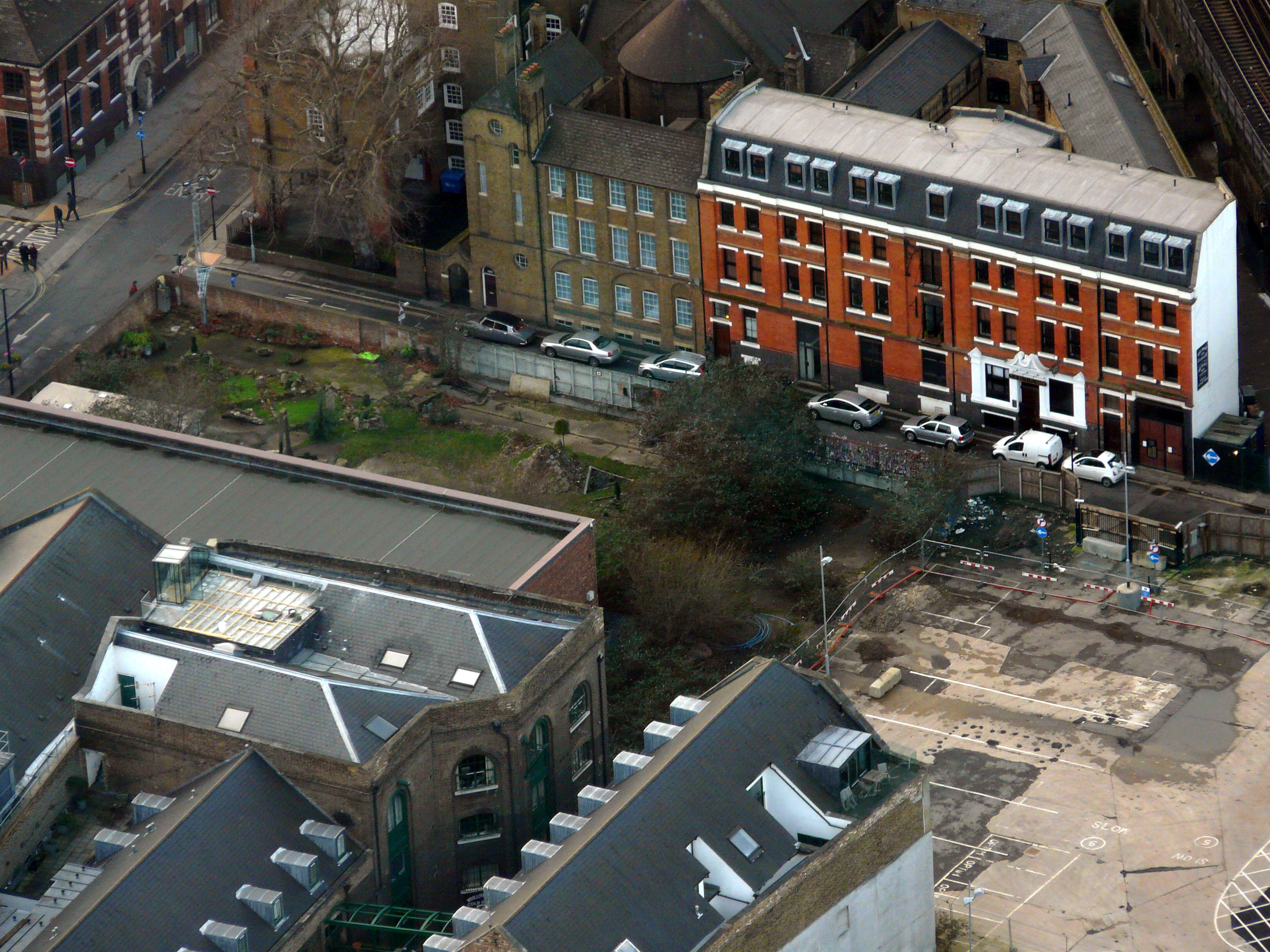
The disused burial ground is on the left.

The earliest known mention of the cemetery comes from John Stow's A Survey of London (1598), which describes a "Single Woman's churchyard" in Southwark, near the Clink:

Next on this [west bank of the Thames] was sometimes the Bordello, or Stewes, a place so called of certain stew-houses privileged there, for the repair of incontinent men to the like women ... I have heard of ancient men, of good credit, report, that these single women were forbidden the rites of the church, so long as they continued that sinful life, and were excluded from Christian burial, if they were not reconciled before their death. And therefore there was a plot of ground called the Single Woman's churchyard, appointed for them far from the parish church.

By 1769 it had become a general pauper's cemetery for the local area, which was a notorious slum. The graveyard was described again in a 1795 history of St. Saviour's, Southwark:

Our readers will remember that, in the account we have given of the Stews on Bank-side, mention is made of a piece of ground, called the Single Woman’s Burying Ground, set apart as the burial place of those unfortunate females; we are very much inclined to believe this was the spot, for in early times the ceremony of consecration would certainly not have been omitted; and if it had been performed, it would doubtless have appeared by some register, either in the possession of the Bishop of Winchester, or in the proper ecclesiastical court. We find no other place answering the description given of a ground appropriated as a burial place for these women, circumstances, therefore, justify the supposition of this being the place; for it was said, the ground was not consecrated; and the ordination was that they should not be buried in any spot so sanctified.

The origin of the name "Cross Bones" for the site is also unknown, with the 1795 history being the earliest known mention of the name. However, an 1833 work by antiquarian William Taylor is the first to explicitly state that the modern site on Redcross Street is the same as the "single woman's churchyard" of Stow's era.

=== Closure and sale ===
The graveyard was closed in 1853 because it was "completely overcharged with dead," and further burials were deemed "inconsistent with a due regard for the public health and public decency." The land was sold in 1883 to be redeveloped, prompting an objection from Lord Brabazon in a letter to The Times, asking that it be saved from "such desecration." The sale was declared null and void the following year under the Disused Burial Grounds Act 1884.

Further attempts in the following years to develop the site, including a brief period as a fairground, were opposed by local people. After the removal of some of the remains to the parish facilities in Brookwood Cemetery, Surrey, the site was covered in warehousing and other commercial buildings, including a timber yard.

=== Excavations ===
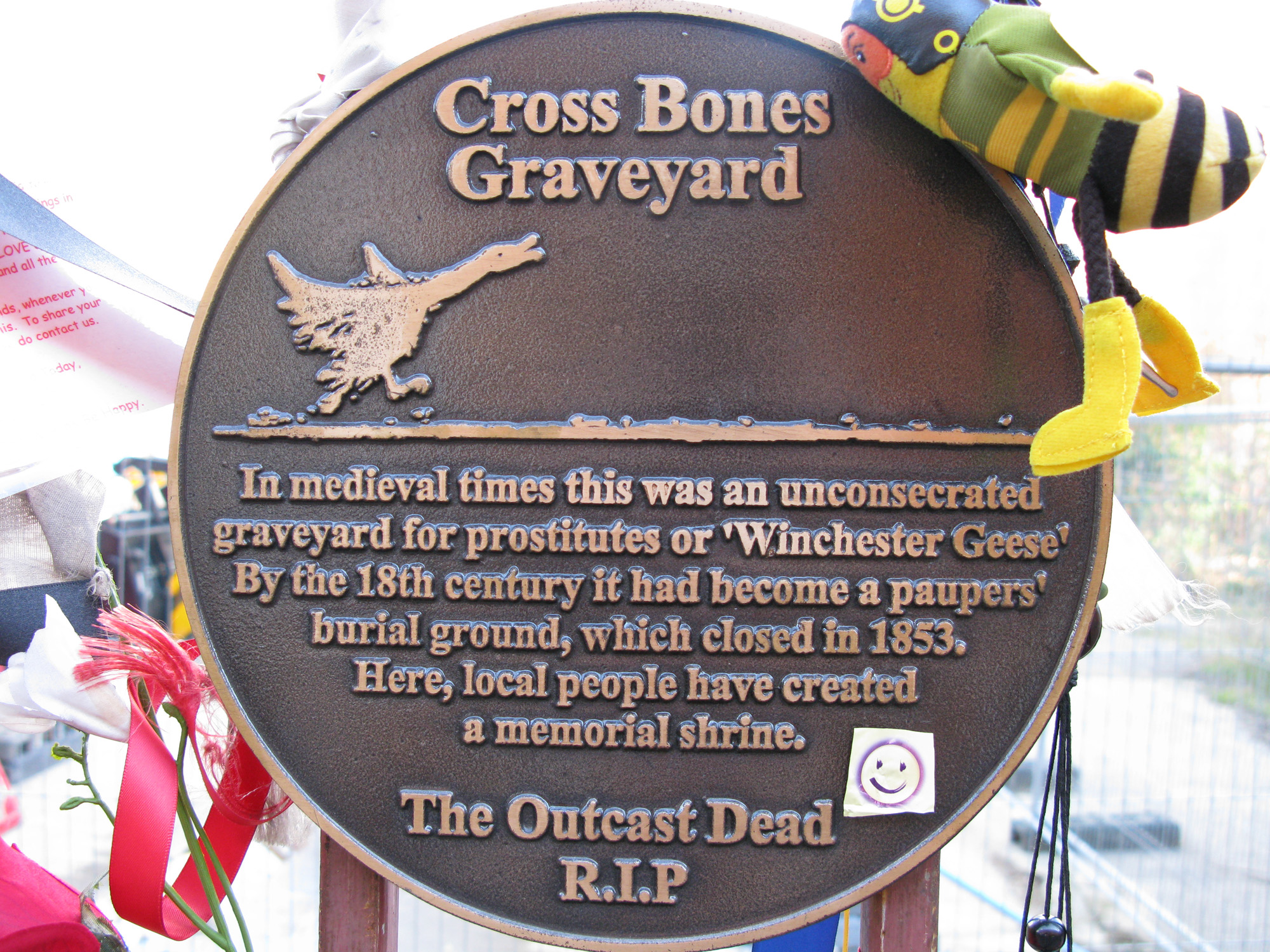
A plaque on the gates, funded by Southwark Council

In 1928, workmen pulling down a school built at the corner of Redcross Street and Union Street found "many human skeletons" underneath the foundations.

In 1989, Transport for London bought a large plot, including the then-derelict Cross Bones site, forming a triangle between Redcross Street, Union Street, and Southwark Street, with the intention of using the land as a work site for the Jubilee line extension.

Investigations of the site ahead of its redevelopment were conducted by the Museum of London Archaeology Service between 1991 and 1998. Archaeologists found a highly overcrowded graveyard with bodies piled on top of one another, with those buried there having suffered diseases including smallpox, tuberculosis, Paget's disease, osteoarthritis, and vitamin D deficiency.

One dig alone in 1992 uncovered 148 graves, dating from between 1800 and 1853. More than a third of the bodies were perinatal, between 22 weeks gestation and seven days after birth. A further 11 percent were under one year old. The adults were mostly women aged 36 and older. Based on the density of burials within the small excavated areas of the site, archaeologist have estimated that as many as 15,000 people are buried in Cross Bones.

In 2022, one of the most significant Roman archaeological sites ever found in London—including a mausoleum and highly preserved mosaic—was uncovered on the wider plot of land just outside the boundaries of Cross Bones.

=== Campaign to restore ===
In 1996, in response to the threat of redevelopment, a local group, Friends of Cross Bones, formed to campaign to preserve the graveyard and to raise awareness of its historical and cultural significance. From 2006 to 2012 the group also cultivated an unofficial "guerrilla" memorial garden on the site.

In 2006, Southwark Council also installed a brass plaque:

Cross Bones Graveyard

In medieval times this was an unconsecrated graveyard for prostitutes or 'Winchester Geese'
By the 18th century it had become a paupers' burial ground, which closed in 1853.
Here, local people have created a memorial shrine.

The Outcast Dead
RIP

In 2013, Friends of Cross Bones and the Bankside Open Spaces Trust (BOST) started campaigning together for Cross Bones to become an official garden of remembrance, dedicated to "the outcast dead." In 2019 the campaign succeeded, and BOST was granted a 30-year lease over the site by Transport for London.

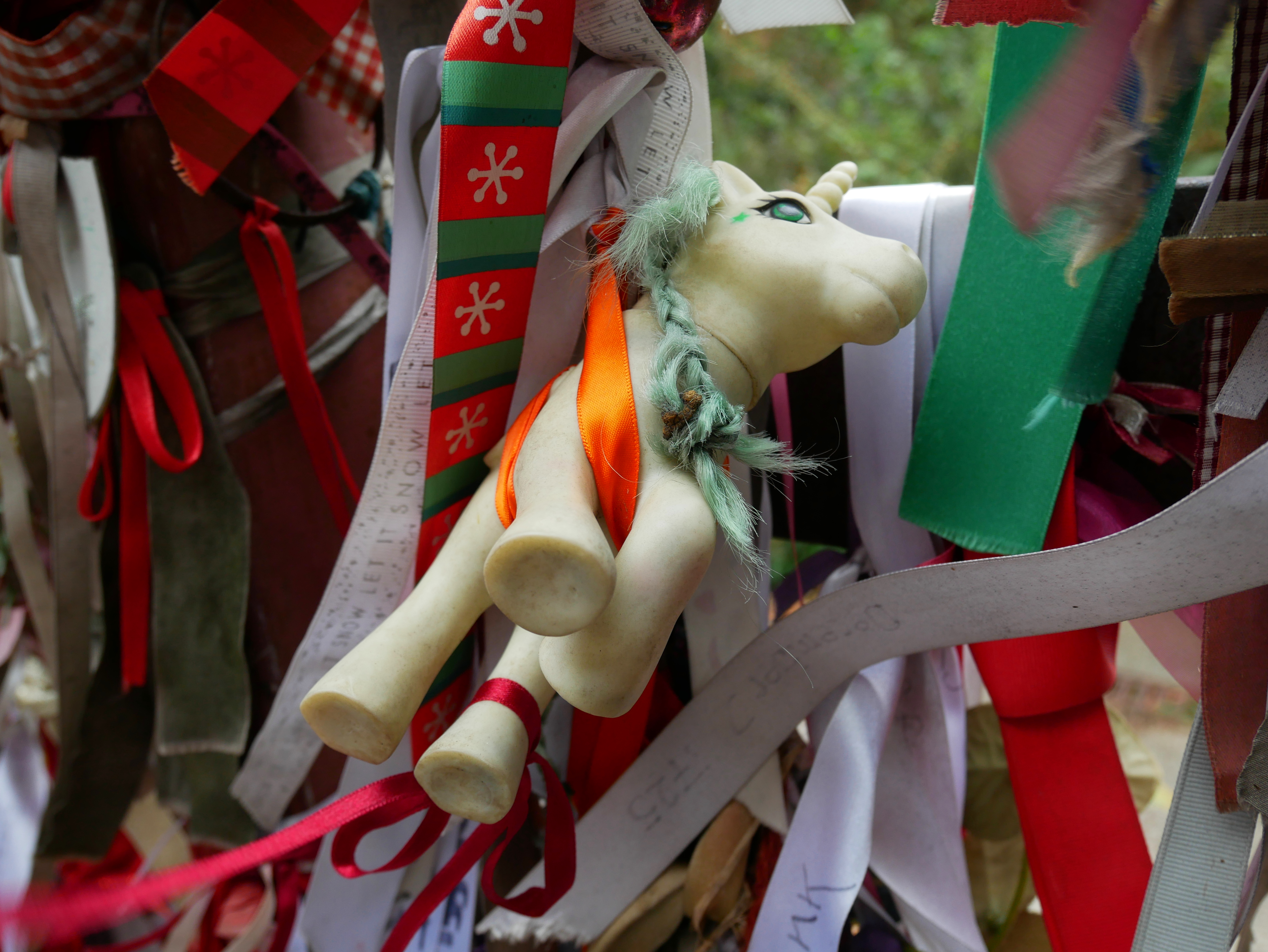
Material affixed to the Cross Bones gate

Cross Bones is currently open to the public. The entrance gates are on Redcross Way, as is a permanent shrine where visitors can leave messages, ribbons, flowers and other tokens. Since June 2004, a short memorial ceremony has also been held at the gates on the 23rd of each month by Friends of Cross Bones.

== Depictions in media ==
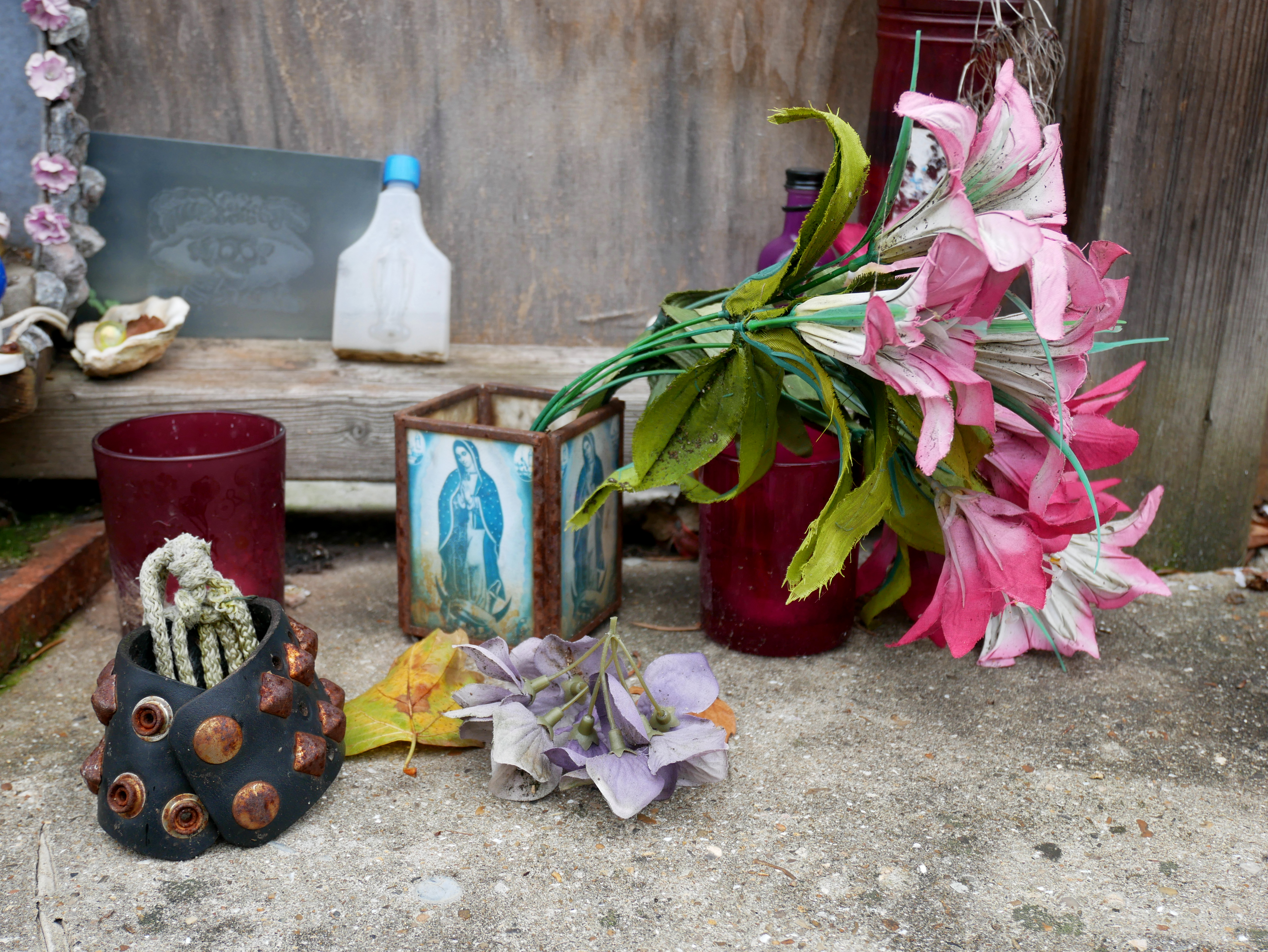
Objects left inside the Cross Bones garden

Cross Bones is a major inspiration for The Southwark Mysteries, a series of poems and mystery plays published from 1999 onwards by local author John Constable. Plays from the series were performed at Shakespeare's Globe and Southwark Cathedral in 2000, and again in 2010.

Constable claims that his stories were "transmitted" to him by "The Goose," the spirit of a medieval sex worker interred in the graveyard, and from 1998 to 2010 he hosted an annual Halloween "ritual drama" at Southwark Playhouse to honour all those buried there. Constable also co-founded Friends of Cross Bones in 1996, and led the group's monthly memorial services from their inception in June 2004 until November 2019.

In 2004, writer and poet Frank Molloy published "Big Daves Gusset", a poem about the burial plot. The title refers to a piece of graffiti on the adjacent wall of a burnt-out shed. The poem was included in his 2020 book Soul City Wandering.

In 2014, author Elly Griffiths published The Outcast Dead, a book that featured a gravesite and ceremony based on Cross Bones, although the setting was changed to Norwich.

In August 2019, singer-songwriter Frank Turner included a song about Cross Bones, called "The Graveyard of the Outcast Dead", on his album No Man's Land. His podcast, Frank Turner's Tales From No Man's Land, also featured an episode about the history of Cross Bones.

Singer-songwriter Reg Meuross included the song "The Crossbones Graveyard" on his album RAW in October 2019.
