= John Baptist Grano =

British composer

- Born: c. 1692
- Died: c. 1748
- Occupations: Trumpeter, flutist, composer
- Known for: Imprisonment in the Marshalsea prison, 1728–1729
- Notable work: Diary of John Baptist Grano, held in the Bodleian Library, University of Oxford (Rawlinson D. 34)
- Spouse: Mary Thurman
- Parent(s): John Baptist Grano or Granom, Jane Villeneuve

John Baptist Grano (c. 1692 – c. 1748) was an English trumpeter, flutist and composer, who worked with George Frederick Handel at the opera house in London's Haymarket.

Grano is best known for having been imprisoned for a debt of £99 in the notorious Marshalsea prison in Southwark from May 1728 until September 1729. He kept a diary of his time there, the manuscript of which is held in the Bodleian Library, Oxford. It was published in 1998 as Handel's Trumpeter: The Diary of John Grano, edited by John Ginger, with a foreword by Crispian Steele-Perkins. The diary has become an important primary source of material about the Marshalsea. It details Grano's friendships, love affairs and adventures as he struggles to earn enough money to buy his freedom.

== Personal life ==
Grano's father, John Baptist Grano (also written Granom), and his mother Jane Villeneuve, originally from France, lived in London toward the end of the 17th century. An entry in the poor rate returns in 1698 places them in Angel Court, Charing Cross. John Ginger writes that the father may have been a regimental trumpeter in the Dutch Guards who travelled to England during the Glorious Revolution of 1688, when James II was overthrown.

The couple later moved to Pall Mall, where they ran a haberdasher's. Their first son, John Baptist, died in 1691, and their second, the John Baptist of this article, was given the same name. There were three other children: Jane, born in 1697, Mary, and Lewis. The surviving brothers were given a musical education.

Grano married Mary Thurman at St James Piccadilly on 30 July 1713. Ginger writes that the application for the marriage licence states that bride and groom were both over 21, although Mary was in fact 15. The marriage produced one child and ended in or around 1719.

== Career ==
Ginger writes that, around 1709, Grano joined the orchestra in the Haymarket. He was paid 10 shillings per performance twice a week, playing the rest of the time in salons in Lincoln's Inn Fields or St James's Square, where he earned between two and four guineas an evening. The earliest record of him as a trumpeter is around 1711, when the Duchess of Shrewsbury hired him to play during a reception in the Lord Chamberlain's apartment at Kensington Palace.

Grano joined the Horse Guards on a salary of 17s. 6d., but Ginger writes that in 1719 he left suddenly for The Hague. A reward of three guineas was offered for his return. A notice of the reward in the Daily Courant described him as a "short black man in a light tye wig," a joke on the part of Grano's commander, the Marquess of Winchester, who intended to imply that Grano was a common runaway, according to Ginger.

Grano returned to England around March 1720, playing his trumpet and flute compositions in several salons, including in Drury Lane. During the same year, his name was added as a member of the orchestra of the proposed Royal Academy of Music, with George Frederick Handel as master of the orchestra and John James Heidegger as manager. He set up home with John Jones, a violinist, in Oxford Street, between Holles Street and Cavendish Street. By 1728 there is a record of Jones's wife living with them.

== Imprisonment ==
According to Ginger, Grano's financial problems began with the South Sea bubble of 1720. Ginger writes that it was a bad time for anyone who relied for their living on the moneyed classes, as Grano did. As a result, Grano was imprisoned for debt in the Marshalsea from 30 May 1728 until 23 September 1729, owing 99 pounds to "Andrew Turner et al." He was held on the "Master's side" of the prison, which catered for wealthier prisoners able to pay both the prison fees and an additional amount that allowed them to leave the prison during the day. This was crucial, as it meant he could work to pay off the debt. These privileges existed in contrast to the squalid "Commons side," where prisoners were held indefinitely and routinely starved to death.

Grano kept a diary of his 480 days there. The 510-page manuscript is part of the Bodleian Library's Rawlinson collection, as Rawlinson D. 34. It was published in 1998 as Handel's Trumpeter: The Diary of John Grano, edited by John Ginger.

== Musical legacy ==
Grano has an entry in The New Grove Dictionary of Music and Musicians. A book of his flute sonatas was published in 1728.
