= John Constable (writer) =

English playwright, poet, performer and activist

John Hamilton Constable (born 22 July 1952) is an English playwright, poet, performer and activist, author of The Southwark Mysteries. He describes himself as having a shamanic alter-ego named John Crow and that, while taking a large dose of LSD, he channeled the spirit of a medieval whore, who told him that the Cross Bones Graveyard was created for sexworkers.

== Life ==
Constable was born in Much Wenlock, Shropshire in 1952. He was educated at Oswestry School (1963–69) and Queens' College, Cambridge (1970–73). In the mid-1970s, he performed at David Medalla's Artists For Democracy. From 1977 to 1979, he lived in Japan and travelled widely in the Far East. From 1980 to 1982, toured Europe with the street theatre group Sheer Madness, playing Hamlet in the devised show Shakespeare's Greatest Hits.

From 1984, following the production of Black Mas by Foco Novo he returned to live in London. His plays included The Fit Up, Tulip Futures, Iceman and The False Hairpiece. He also wrote children's plays, radio dramas, and dramatisations of Gormenghast and The Mosquito Coast for the David Glass Ensemble.

In 1986, he moved to The Borough, in Southwark, then a poor and much maligned part of south London. The area had a profound influence on his work, which draws freely on its 2,000 year history and the far-reaching changes that saw it reinvented as prime real estate in the heart of London. In 1994 in Sicily, he met his companion Katharine Nicholls, a craftworker and community outreach worker. In their activism and esoteric work at Crossbones and with outsiders, she also became known as Katy Kaos. One of the poems in The Southwark Mysteries is entitled kateEkaos. She stage-managed his solo shows and site-specific events, co-produced the epic productions of The Southwark Mysteries and created the original "Hand-Maid" limited edition of The Book of The Goose.

In 1995, he wrote and performed a solo show I Was An Alien Sex God. This inaugurated a new phase of experimental writing which produced his best-known work, The Southwark Mysteries. These began in 1996 as a cycle of mystical poems revealed to his shamanistic alter-ego, John Crow, by "The Goose", who claimed to have been buried in the unconsecrated Cross Bones Graveyard. The Winchester Geese were medieval sex workers in the Bankside brothels licensed by the Bishop of Winchester under Ordinances dating back to 1161. The Southwark Mysteries grew from a poem cycle to a contemporary mystery play, first performed in Shakespeare's Globe and Southwark Cathedral on 23 April 2000.

From 2004 to 2012 he was artistic director of the community arts group Southwark Mysteries, conducting guided walks, workshops and site-specific performances inspired by the work. The Halloween of Cross Bones, conducted annually from 1998 to 2010, ended with a candle-lit procession to the gates of Crossbones, the outcasts' burial ground. He led a long campaign to protect the burial ground and to establish a garden of remembrance on the site. A new production of The Southwark Mysteries was staged in Southwark Cathedral in 2010.

In November 2010 John Constable was awarded an Honorary Fellowship of London South Bank University for services to the arts and community: "… for his vision and imagination, for his deep commitment to our local area, for his work in reclaiming lost histories and, above all, for his belief in the transformative power of writing and drama..." At Southwark's Civic Award Ceremony in May 2011, he received The Liberty of the Old Metropolitan Borough of Southwark.

In recognition of his work at Crossbones, and for the human rights of sex workers and other outsiders, Constable was named Campaigner of the Year at the 2011 Erotic Awards. His Sha-Manic Plays, Gormenghast, The Southwark Mysteries and Secret Bankside – Walks In The Outlaw Borough are published by Oberon Books. In 2014 Thin Man Press published Spark In The Dark, his first collection of poetry

In 2020 he moved to Glastonbury, drawing on his first year living in the town for his book Grail (2022).

== Plays ==
John Constable's first play, Black Mas, was inspired by a visit to the Trinidad Carnival in 1982. It explores the adventures of two white British musicians visiting Trinidad for fresh inspiration and getting out of their depth under the heady influence of Carnival. The Guardian's Robin Thornber wrote: "It's a powerful piece that works on many levels, using the exotic trappings of its setting to cast its spell, but probing incessantly into the murky depths of racial and sexual mythology."

The play, directed by Roland Rees for Foco Novo, opened at the New End Theatre, Hampstead followed by a UK tour. Other early work includes The Fit Up (Nuffield Theatre, Southampton) and The Complete Casanova (Proteus-Horshoe Theatre, Croydon Warehouse). He was commissioned by RADA to write Hot Fondue, a contemporary play loosely based on Schnitzler's La Ronde, directed by Roland Rees14.

In the 1990s, having worked with physical theatre director David Glass on the devised show Bozo's Dead, he was commissioned to write the stage adaptation of Gormenghast for the David Glass Ensemble. His 1994 play Tulip Futures concerned Tulip mania, the seventeenth century speculation on tulips which nearly bankrupt the Dutch economy. Tulip Futures was nominated for the Peggy Ramsay Award.

Iceman is a black comedy about the war on drugs: an undercover policeman gets so deep into his cover, he winds up busting himself. It was short-listed for the Verity Bargate Award and produced by Brute Farce at the White Bear Theatre, Kennington.

In 1995, Constable wrote and performed I Was an Alien Sex God, directed by Di Sherlock. The show opened in London at Battersea Arts Centre, followed by a popular and critically acclaimed run on the Edinburgh Fringe. Ian Shuttleworth's review began by quoting its most memorable line: '... "Let's get this straight, Commissioner - you're saying that if David Bowie and I have sex, it'll destroy the universe?" John Constable fully exploits his passing resemblance to the Thin White Duke in his mind-blowingly weird one-man show which takes in acid trips, mind-body transference, quantum physics, Berlin gay clubs and the end of the world as we know it.'

Constable's subsequent work seems intent on dissolving the lines between art and life. In the introduction to Sha-Manic Plays, he acknowledged John Crow as a literary persona appearing in his work in various guises. In his next work, John Crow took on a life of his own. According to Constable, The Southwark Mysteries was "revealed by The Goose to John Crow at Crossbones... on the night of the 23rd November 1996. My shamanic double had somehow raised the Spirit of a medieval Whore, licensed by a Bishop, yet allegedly denied Christian burial."

In The Book of The Constable, one of the poems of The Southwark Mysteries, 'The Goose and the Crow' seem to prophesy the chain of coincidences that lead Constable to write a contemporary mystery play with the support of the Very Rev'd Colin Slee, Dean of Southwark Cathedral, and the actor Mark Rylance, then artistic director of Shakespeare's Globe. In the play, Jesus ('The Son of Man in the street') returns to Southwark to save its lost souls, the heretic John Crow, and The Goose in the guise of Mary Magdalene.

The play premièred in Shakespeare's Globe – with the climactic Harrowing of Hell scene staged in Southwark Cathedral – on Easter Sunday, 23 April 2000. The Dean defended the performance of this controversial work in the cathedral. A headline in The Sunday Telegraph read: 'Dean rejects critics of Southwark's "swearing Jesus" Mystery Play'.

Selected texts from The Southwark Mysteries featured in his site-specific ritual dramas - The Anatomy Class (The Old Operating Theatre), The Goose At Liberty (Southwark Playhouse), The Halloween of Cross Bones, conducted annually from 1998 to 2010, which culminated at the gates of the former burial ground.

Constable's later work similarly drew on the history and contemporary culture of his south London neighbourhood. He wrote the libretto for South of the River, the ENO community opera performed in a big top in Potters Fields.

In 2013, he wrote a one-man show Spare - inspired by the life and work of the south London artist and magician Austin Osman Spare – which he performed in Treadwell's Bookshop and in the White Bear Theatre, Kennington, where Spare himself used to drink and had once exhibited his paintings.

In 2022 he was commissioned to write a new Mummers Play based on Glastonbury's St George legend. The 'Glastonbury St George and The Dragon Mummers Play' was performed in Glastonbury Abbey on 3 June as part of the town's Queen's Platinum Jubilee celebrations.

== Songs ==
Songs from The Southwark Mysteries with music by Richard Kilgour featured in the 2000 and 2010 stage productions. Others, with music by Niall McDevitt, were performed at The Halloween of Crossbones. Constable subsequently wrote a number of his own songs - released on goose & crow : spirit songs, featuring Nigel Hoyle and Katy Carr. On the Gemini City album, Nigel of Bermondsey covered his song The Green Man Is Come.

His texts for Beltane, Lammas and Samhain featured on the MegaT album with music by Universal Mind Sound System. His poems Spark In the Dark and I Am The Wind featured on Hawklords' 2012 album We Are One. He also contributed lyrics for songs on Hawklords' next two albums - White Rag on Dream, and Damned on Censored. In 2022 he released the album 'Ancestor Souls' by John Crow and Queen Space Baroque, performing his poems and incantations with music by Queen Space Baroque

== Radio, television and film ==
Constable wrote Undesirable Activities for the BBC drama series Black Silk. He adapted the John Wyndham novels The Kraken Wakes and Chocky for BBC Radio 4 - subsequently released on DVD in the BBC Classic Radio Sci-Fi series. He has been interviewed many times on the radio about his literary work and appears in many films about the work at Crossbones. In the lead-up to the 2010 production of The Southwark Mysteries he and the Dean of Southwark Cathedral were interviewed on the BBCs Songs of Praise.

== Children's plays and workshops ==
In 1987, for Proteus Theatre Company, Constable devised Forgotten But Not Gone for actors with learning difficulties. He was artistic director of the company during 1989. In the 1990s, he wrote many children's plays for Proteus, including adaptations of Maeterlinck's The Bluebird, Thackeray's The Rose and The Ring, Dickens' A Christmas Carol, Rumpelstiltskin and The Emperor's New Clothes.

As artistic director of the community arts group, Southwark Mysteries, he conducted children's workshops in schools and community centres. His popular workshops included the Our Place and Our Story programmes, which used local history and cultural identity as springboards for the participants' own devised work. His George And The Dragon workshops, first performed in schools in south London, were taken to Cumbria as part of an anti-racist programme. In 2014, he was the dramaturg for Half Moon Young People's Theatre's #LimehouseLandmark programme, featuring devised performances inspired by the history of their building in Limehouse.

== Walks, talks and activism ==
Since 1998, Constable has conducted guided walks around his Borough and Bankside neighbourhood. In 2007, Oberon Books published Secret Bankside – Walks In The Outlaw Borough, a collection of his walks exploring alternative histories of the area. He has been commissioned every year since 2003 to create unusual themed walks for the City of London Festival. He has given talks for groups as diverse as Southwark Council, The Moot With No Name, South East London Folklore Society, Radical Anthropology Group and The Salon For The city.

A long-standing advocate of decriminalisation, he strongly criticised the "War On Drugs",

Since 1998, he has led a campaign by "Friends of Crossbones" to protect the site of the Crossbones burial ground and to establish a garden of remembrance on the site. He and Katharine Nicholls curate a shrine to "the outcast dead" at the gates in Redcross Way, to which hundreds of people have contributed mementos. He performed The Halloween of Crossbones every year from 1998 to 2010, and has led vigils at the gates on the 23rd of every month since June 2004.

Having raised public awareness of Crossbones' historic and cultural importance, he lobbied the site owners Transport for London (TfL) to open a public garden there. 2014 marked an important new phase in this work, when TfL granted a lease for a 'meanwhile garden' to Bankside Open Spaces Trust (BOST).

== Urban shamanism, magic and mysticism ==
Interviewed about his 2013 play, Spare, Constable expresses a sense of kinship with the south London artist and magician Austin Osman Spare and his intuitive approach to magic.

In 2022 he published a new book 'Grail', interweaving history and legends with poetic "spells and invocations" and vignettes of contemporary Glastonbury life.
