= Disused Burial Grounds Act 1884 =

Act of the Parliament of the United Kingdom

Disused Burial Grounds Act 1884 (Note: Section 1.)
- Act of Parliament
- Parliament of the United Kingdom
- Long title: An Act for preventing the erection of Buildings on Disused Burial Grounds.
- Citation: 47 & 48 Vict. c. 72
- Territorial extent: United Kingdom

Dates
- Royal assent: 14 August 1884
- Commencement: 14 August 1884 (Note: Section 3.)
Other legislation
Amended by	Disused Burial Ground (Amendment) Act 1981; Statute Law (Repeals) Act 1993

Status: Amended

Text of statute as originally enacted

Revised text of statute as amended

Text of the Disused Burial Grounds Act 1884 as in force today (including any amendments) within the United Kingdom, from legislation.gov.uk.

The Disused Burial Grounds Act 1884 (47 & 48 Vict. c. 72) is an act of the Parliament of the United Kingdom which forbade the construction of new buildings on disused burial grounds. It permits the extension and repair of existing buildings.

Where building work over disused burial sites has become necessary, Parliament has excluded it from the act. For example, the Second City Crossing of Manchester's tram system had to be built over the crypt of the demolished St Peter's church.

== Subsequent developments ==
Section 4 of the act was repealed by section 1(1) of, and part VI of schedule 1 to, the Statute Law (Repeals) Act 1993, which came into force on 5 November 1993.
