= Norah Schuster =

British pathologist

Norah Henriette Schuster FRCPath
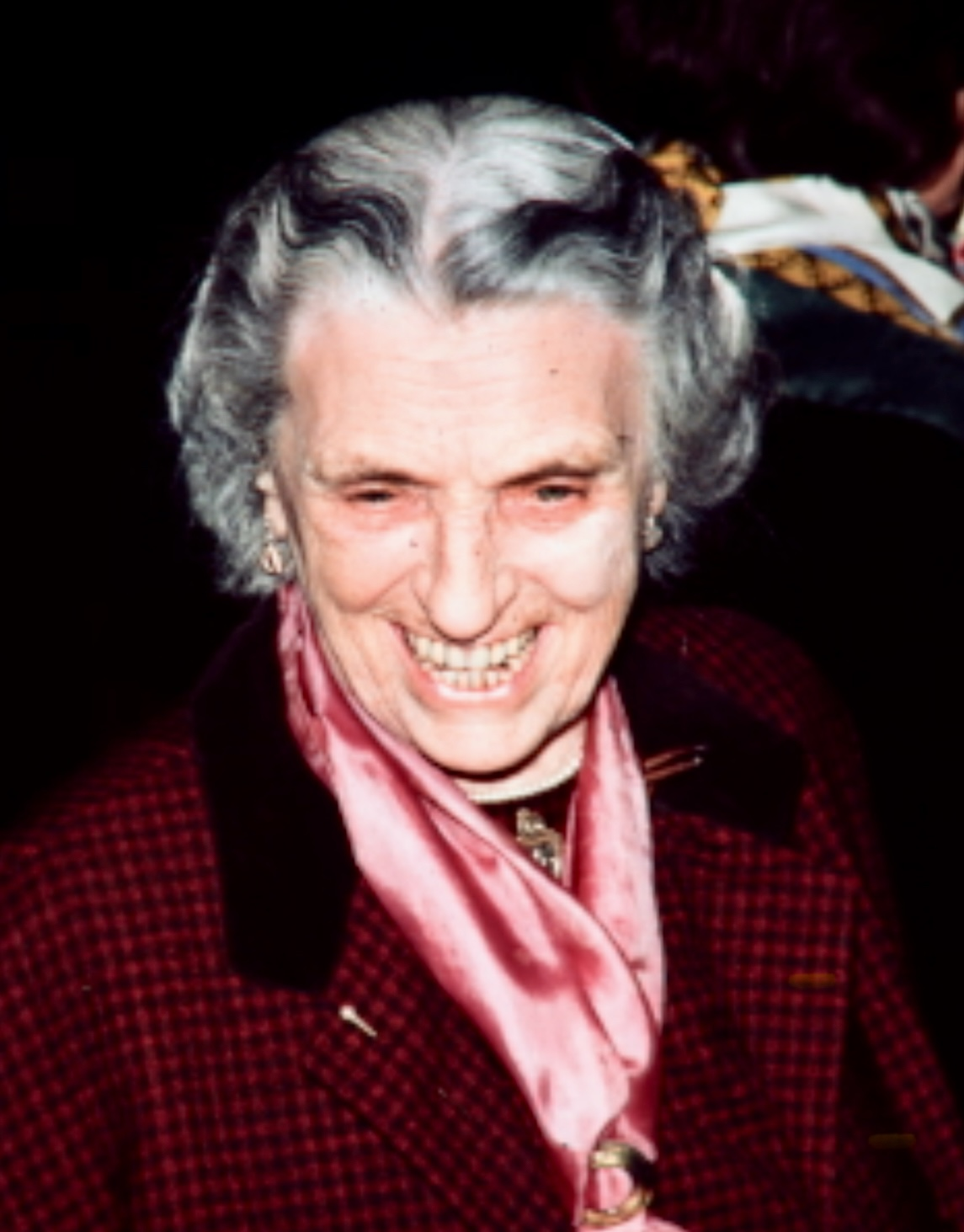
- Schuster (Royal Society of Medicine), late 1970s
- Born: 14 July 1892
- Died: 14 March 1991 (aged 98)
- Education: Manchester University, Newnham College
- Occupation: Pathologist
- Known for: First female president of Association of Clinical Pathologists

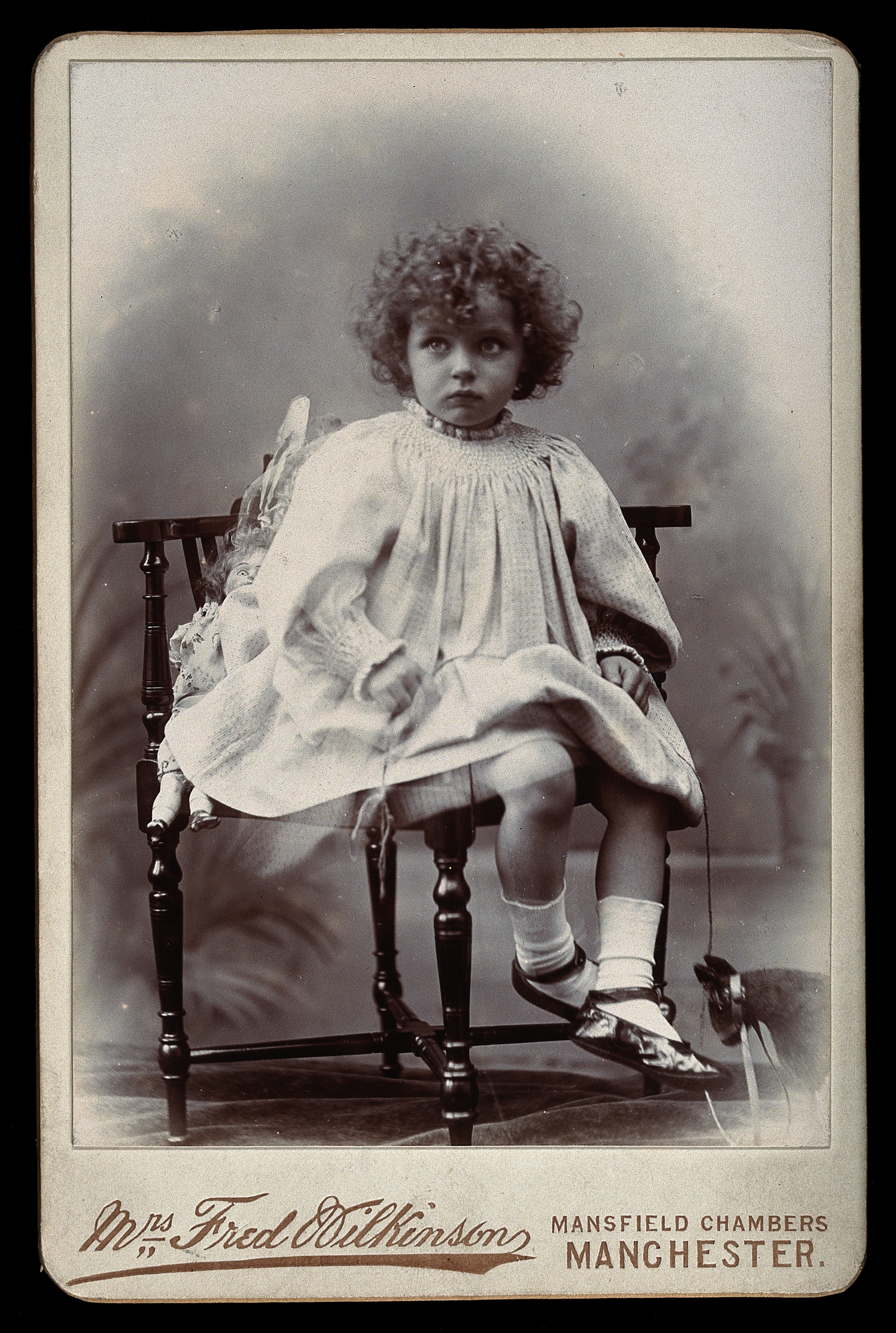
Nora Schuster, aged 3.

Norah Henriette Schuster FRCPath (14 July 1892 – 14 March 1991) was a British pathologist and the first woman to take the pre-clinical medical course at the University of Cambridge. She was the first woman to be appointed as a doctor at the Manchester Royal Infirmary and, in 1950, the first female president of the Association of Clinical Pathologists.

A prize is awarded in her memory by the Royal Society of Medicine's History of Medicine Society.

== Early life ==
Norah Schuster was born on 14 July 1892, the daughter of the German-born British physicist Arthur Schuster who was the first to report the findings of Wilhelm Röntgen about X-rays in the United Kingdom. Later in life, Norah described her father's initial uses of bedside X-rays taken in Manchester in 1896. He gave public lectures on the new technique which Norah and her brother attended, X-rays of their hands and feet being used to illustrate the proceedings for which a ten minute exposure was required due to the weakness of the rays.

Feeling that she could not succeed in pure science, and possibly overshadowed by her eminent father, in 1911 she enrolled as a medical student at the University of Manchester. She was the first woman to take the pre-clinical course at Newnham College, University of Cambridge, between 1912 and 1915, where she obtained a first class degree in the natural sciences tripos.

== Medical career ==
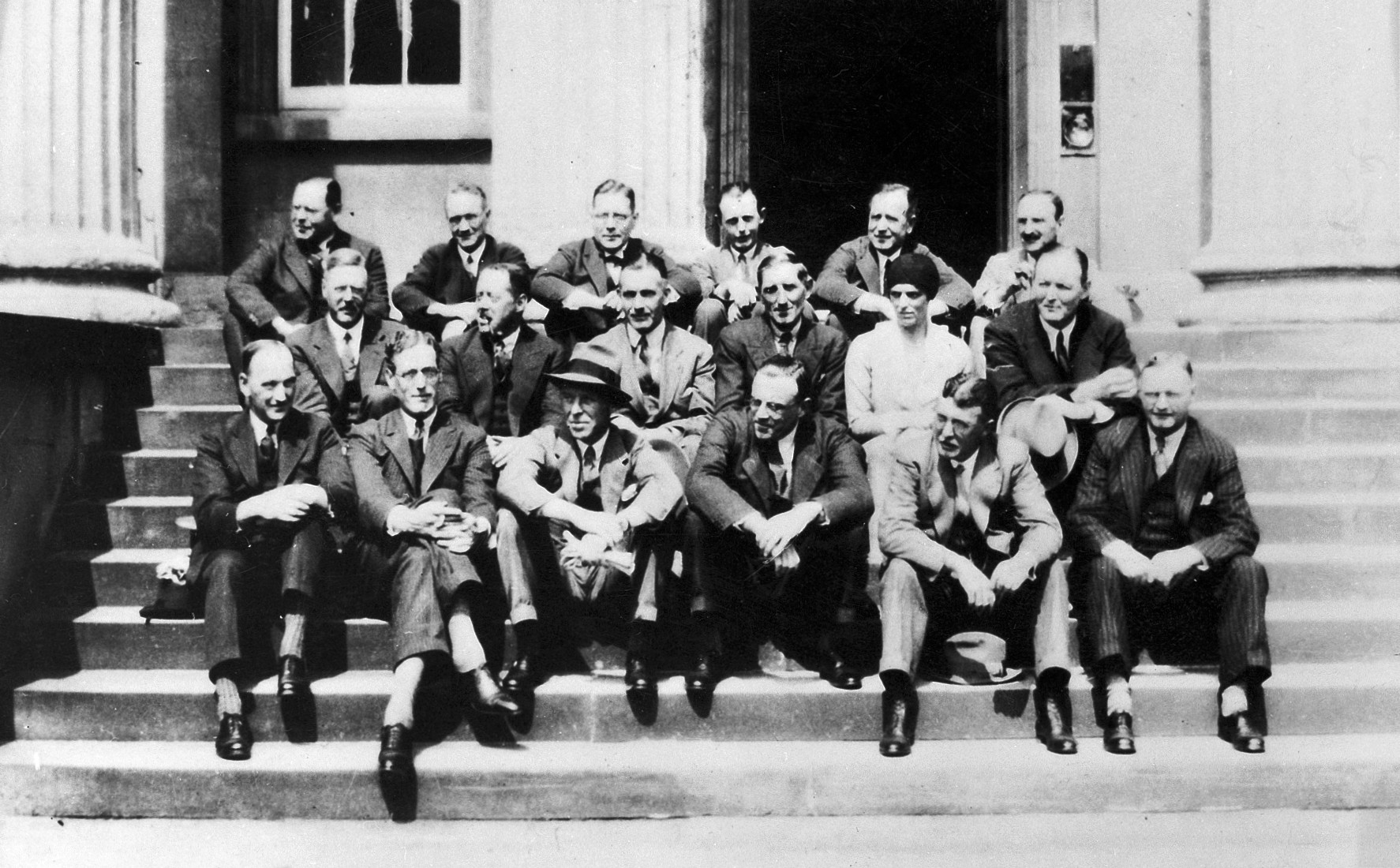
Norah Schuster at the first meeting of the British Pathological Association, 1928. (middle row, second from right)

In 1916, while still a student, Schuster worked as an unpaid assistant in the pathological laboratory of professor Henry Dean at the Manchester Royal Infirmary (MRI) in order to ease the staff shortage caused by the First World War. Edward Brockbank and the pathologist Edward Loveday encouraged her in her studies, and she qualified in medicine at the University of Manchester in 1918 and was awarded a gold medal. She was appointed assistant pathologist at the MRI in the same year, partly because of the continuing shortage of male doctors caused by the war and not without some opposition to the idea, thus becoming the first woman to be employed as a doctor by the hospital since its establishment in 1752.

She became a fellow of the Royal Society of Medicine in 1922. A few years later, in 1925, she married the surgeon Marriott Fawckner Nicholls but continued to practise using her maiden name.

After completing her medical studies, she left Manchester and took up junior resident posts at the Queen's Hospital for Children, Hackney Road, and St George's Hospital, London. She was pathologist at The Infants Hospital, Vincent Square, London, and assistant curator at the museum of St George's Hospital. In 1927, Schuster was selected to be pathologist to the Royal Chest Hospital, London. In addition, she also worked for the Emergency Medical Service during the Second World War, and at Pinewood Hospital, Berkshire. Later, she became a founder fellow of the Royal College of Pathologists and was the first woman president of the Association of Clinical Pathologists in 1950.

== Writing ==
Schuster produced several medical papers but most of her writing was about the history of medicine. She was vice-president of the History of Medicine Society (previously section), at the Royal Society of Medicine for many years, and "remembered fondly as 'an elegant, intelligent lady sitting in the front row" at meetings.

After the closure of the Royal Chest Hospital in 1954, she began to research its history as a result of which she wrote a paper in which she attempted to restore the reputation of the hospital's founder, Isaac Buxton, who she felt had been unfairly criticised in Sir Ernest William Morris's History of the London Hospital. The resulting article was published in the Proceedings of the Royal Society of Medicine in April 1955. Her research papers for that article are held with a selection of her other papers at the London Metropolitan Archive.

== Personal life ==
She played cricket and lacrosse and was captain of the Women's Northern Universities fencing team. She played viola and was a good horsewoman. A selection of her light verse was included in her memoir of 1983.

== Death and legacy ==
Schuster died on 14 March 1991. The Norah Schuster Prize is awarded annually in her memory by the History of Medicine Society at the Royal Society of Medicine. After paying tribute to Schuster and her affection for the history of medicine, the winning students present their essays, often followed by a discussion.

== Selected publications ==
=== Medical ===
- "Ætiology and pathology of primary lung tumours", The Journal of Pathology, Vol. 32, No. 4 (October 1929), pp. 799–811.
- "Pulmonary asbestosis in a dog", The Journal of Pathology, Vol. 34, No. 6 (1931), pp. 751–757.
- "Familial hæmorrhagic telangiectasia associated with multiple aneurysms of the splenic artery", The Journal of Pathology, Vol. 44, No. 1 (January 1937), pp. 29–39.

=== Historical ===
- "Stephen Roodhouse Gloyne. 24th December 1882 – 25th September 1950", The Journal of Pathology, Vol. 63, No. 2 (April 1951), pp. 345–352.
- "The Royal Chest Hospital", British Medical Journal, 17 October 1953.
- "Isaac Buxton, 1773-1825. Founder of the Royal Chest Hospital", Proceedings of the Royal Society of Medicine, April 1955.
- "History of the Royal Chest Hospital", Northern Lights, the Staff Magazine of the Northern Group of Hospitals, 1955. (two parts)
- The Western General Dispensary, St Marylebone. St Marylebone Society Publications, No. 5, 1961.
- "Early Days of Roentgen Photography in Britain", British Medical Journal, 3 November 1962, 2 (5313), pp. 1164–1166.
- PMC 1902240 "English Doctors in Russia in the Early Nineteenth Century", Journal of the Royal Society of Medicine, Vol. 61, No. 2 (February 1968), pp. 185–190.
- "The emperor of Russia and the Royal Humane Society", Journal of the Royal College of General Practitioners, Vol. 21 (1971), pp. 634–644.
- A Clinical Pathologist Day by Day 1916-1960. Norah H. Schuster, London, 1983. Memoirs written for the Royal College of Pathologists in response to enquiries from later generations as to how a hospital laboratory was run before the Emergency Medical Service for the war period (1939-1945) and before the Royal College of Pathologists (1963) came into existence. Publication held at the Royal Society of Medicine Library, London.
