= Marriott Fawckner Nicholls =

English surgeon (1898–1969)

Sir Marriott Fawckner Nicholls CBE, FRCS
- Born: 12 May 1898; London, England
- Died: 25 August 1969 (aged 71); Khartoum, Sudan
- Education: City of London School, University of Cambridge
- Occupation: Surgeon
- Known for: Genito-urinary surgery
- Relatives: Norah Schuster (1st wife); Mary Edith Harrison (2nd wife)

Sir Marriott Fawckner Nicholls CBE, FRCS, (12 May 1898 – 25 August 1969) was an English surgeon who specialised in the genitourinary tract. He served in the British Army in both the First and Second World Wars and was dean of the medical school at St George's Hospital for 20 years. At the age of 64 he became professor of surgery at the University of Khartoum in Sudan, where he maintained the position until his death five years later.

== Early life and family ==
Marriott Fawckner Nicholls was born in London on 12 May 1898, the son of Marriott Edwin Nicholls. He received his basic education at the City of London School after which he attended Clare College, Cambridge. His studies were interrupted due to the First World War during which he served in the Royal Fusiliers. He was demobilised in 1919 with the rank of captain. He finally graduated in 1921.

In 1925 he married the pathologist Norah Schuster (1892-1991). In 1939 he married Mary Edith Harrison (died 1972).

Also known as "Nick", he was fond of fishing and cricket and supported his medical school cricket club.

== Career ==
Nicholls undertook his clinical training at St George's Hospital, qualifying in 1923. He became a fellow of the Royal College of Surgeons of England (FRCS) in 1926, and graduated with a bachelor of surgery degree in 1928. He received a master's degree in surgery in 1932. He won the Allingham Scholarship in surgery at St George's in 1925 and the Sir Francis Laking Research Scholarship in 1928–29 and in 1929–30. Some of his happiest times were when he became assistant curator of the museum there in 1926.

He joined the consultant staff at St George's in 1932 and began a successful career in surgery with a specialism in genito-urinary work. He was visiting surgeon at the Atkinson Morley's Convalescent Hospital in 1936, replacing Bryan Burns. He was dean of the Medical School from 1936 to 1956, whilst still actively at work as a surgeon. One of his major difficulties stemmed from the move of St George's Hospital from Hyde Park Corner to Tooting, and he was successful in being the first to effectively transfer his department to this new site. He was a consultant to the Belgrave Children's Hospital and the Royal Chest Hospital and held the position of general surgeon at the Royal National Orthopaedic Hospital. In addition, he was chairman of the Court of Examiners at the Royal College of Surgeons for 2 years. He also stood for the 1952 Royal College of Surgeons Council elections, however, Price Thomas received most votes. Despite this, he served on the council of the British Association of Urological Surgeons and was president of the Section of Urology of the Royal Society of Medicine in 1960–61.

He served in the Royal Army Medical Corps during the Second World War (1940-1946), starting as a lieutenant-colonel running a surgical division in Freetown, Sierra Leone, before becoming a brigadier with the Fourteenth Army, serving with South East Asia Command. He was made Commander of the Most Excellent Order of the British Empire in 1946.

In 1962, Nicholls became professor of surgery at the University of Khartoum, Sudan, in succession to Julian Taylor. He was knighted in 1969.

== Death and legacy ==
Nicholls died of coronary thrombosis in Khartoum, Sudan, on 25 August 1969. He received an obituary in The Lancet and is recorded in Plarr's Lives of the Fellows. The "Nicholls Ward", at St George's Hospital, London, is named in his honour.
