= Surrey Dispensary =

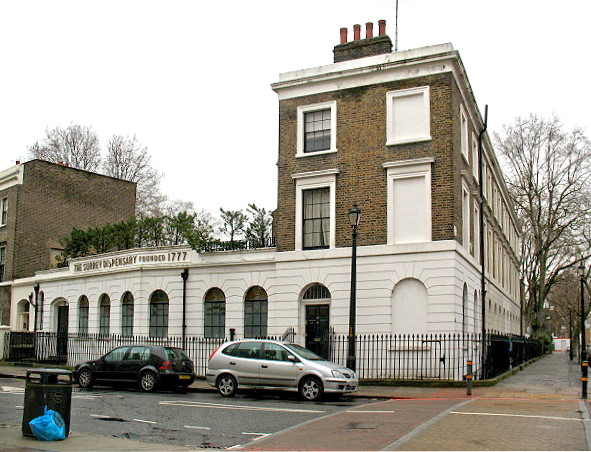
- The former Surrey Dispensary, Falmouth Road, Southwark, 2010. Home of the dispensary from 1927.

- Location within Southwark

Geography
- Location: Southwark, London, England, United Kingdom
- Coordinates: 51.4979°N 0.0909°W

History
- Founded: 1777
- Closed: c.1971

Links
- Lists: Hospitals in England

The Surrey Dispensary was founded in 1777 to administer advice and medicine to the poor of the Borough of Southwark and places adjacent. It was once one of the largest dispensaries in south London.

== History ==
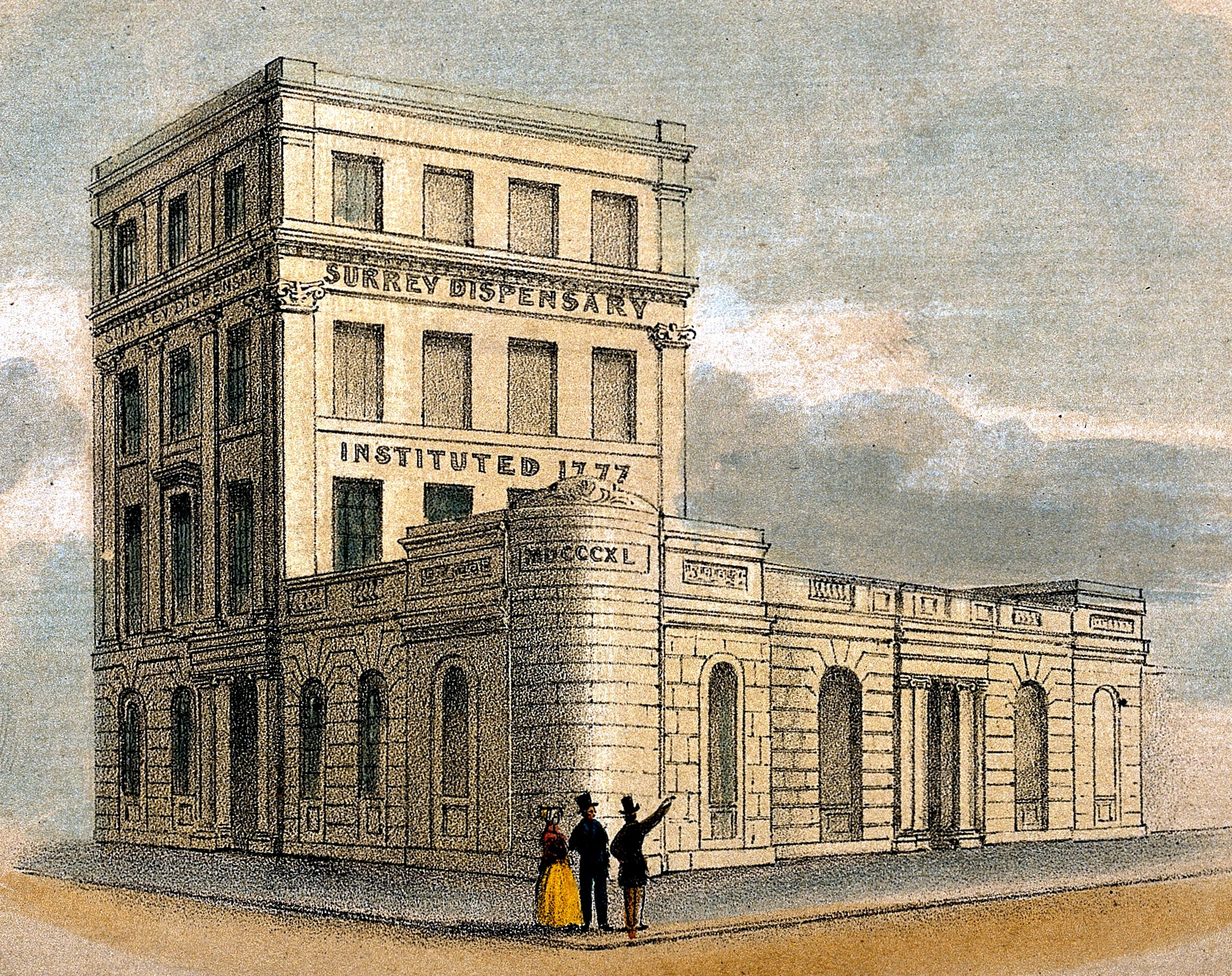
The Surrey Dispensary, Great Dover Street, Southwark. Coloured lithograph by R. Alford, c.1840. This building was used by the dispensary between 1840 and 1927.

The Dispensary was founded in Montague Close, Southwark, near St Saviour's Church, in 1777 to administer advice and medicine to the poor of the Borough of Southwark and places adjacent. Southwark was at that time part of the county of Surrey. Between 2 March 1778 and 30 April 1782 it admitted 10,978 patients of which 8,624 were "cured" and 404 died. In addition 5,405 were attended at home. In 1782, when its president was the Rt. Hon. Lord Onslow, it issued a prospectus to raise subscriptions. It explained that,

The poor constitute an important part of every large community, and justly merit the attention and assistance of the rich; especially in sickness, when they are rendered incapable of supporting themselves and their families. Hard labour, unwholesome food, want of proper clothing, and exposure to the vicissitudes of air and weather, subject them to many disorders unknown to those whose affluence can procure the conveniences of life.

Following the issue of the prospectus, the Dispensary moved to a purpose-built building in Union Street in 1784, and then to Great Dover Street in 1840 when its lease was about to expire.

In 1842, more than 1,000 patients were attended at home by the physicians and surgeons and in addition there were 514 midwifery cases. The dispensary saw about 300 patients each day. In 1845, its management included the Earl of Egmont as president, 12 vice presidents, three trustees, a treasurer, four physicians and other medical officers. Between 2 March 1778 and 1 January 1845, 235,489 patients were admitted. Of these, 16,000 "partially benefited" and 205,024 were "cured". It was once one of the largest dispensaries in south London.

In 1844, C.J.B. Aldis, a Surrey Dispensary medical officer, gave evidence to the Royal Commission on the State of Large Towns and Populous Districts in which he reported that the Dispensary had four physicians and saw around 7,000 cases annually. Diseases seen included fever, inflammatory affections, derangements of the intestinal canal, scrofula and smallpox. He also commented that while bleeding could be done freely in rural and suburban town districts, it should not be attempted in the "depressed districts". He admitted to frequently visiting places where excrement accumulated for months or remained in streets until the showers of rain washed it away.

In 1927 the dispensary moved to the corner of Falmouth Road and Trinity Street where its former building is grade II listed with Historic England. The building became a private residence in 1971.

== Physicians ==
Physicians who worked at the Dispensary include John Sims (1782), William Hawes (1782), Isaac Buxton (1800s, founder of the Royal Chest Hospital), James Sims, and Charles Aldis (1843). Buxton was noted for having "no rowdiness" in his clinics.

== Legacy ==
As of 2018, a charity still exists by the name of the Surrey Dispensary which makes small grants to the sick, convalescent, disabled or infirm of north Southwark. Since January 2019 the fund has been administered by another local charity, the St George the Martyr Charity.
