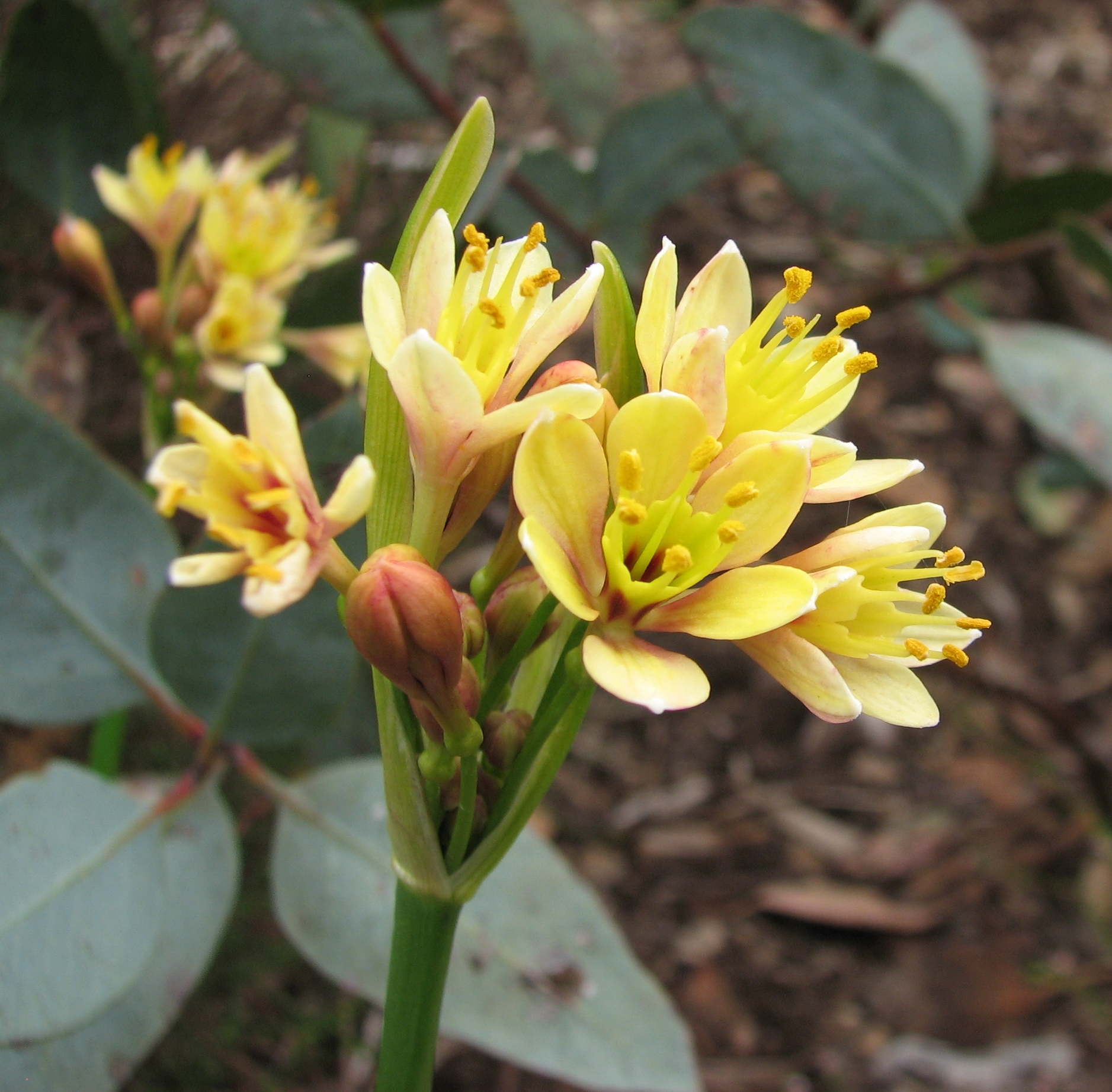
- Calostemma luteum

Scientific classification
- Kingdom: Plantae
- Clade: Tracheophytes
- Clade: Angiosperms
- Clade: Monocots
- Order: Asparagales
- Family: Amaryllidaceae
- Subfamily: Amaryllidoideae
- Genus: Calostemma; R.Br.

Species
- See text

= Calostemma =

Genus of flowering plants

Calostemma is a small genus of herbaceous, perennial and bulbous plants in the Amaryllis family (Amaryllidaceae, subfamily Amaryllidoideae), commonly known as Wilcannia Lily. It consists of three species endemic to Australia, where they are distributed in arid regions with summer precipitation.

== Description ==
Members of Calostemma often flower in a leafless state, the narrow, shining-green, strap-like leaves usually preceding flowering and reaching a length of 25–30 cm. Flower colour is a purplish red or yellow with a tube sometimes paler and the anthers yellow.

== Species ==
The list of Calostemma species, with their complete scientific name and authority, is given below.

- Calostemma abdicatum P.J.Lang, distributed in South Australia.
- Calostemma luteum Sims, from Center Queensland to South Australia.
- Calostemma purpureum R.Br., South Central and South Eastern Australia.

== Uses ==
Due to their large and showy flowers, members of this genus are used as ornamental plants.

== Bibliography ==
- Cooper, H.M. 1971. Notes and observations on Calostemma purpureum. S. Austral. Nat. 45(4): 112–114.
- Clark, T., Parsons, R.F. 1994. Ecology of Calostemma and Crinum (Amaryllidaceae) in the River Murray area, south-eastern Australia. Proc. Roy. Soc. Victoria 106: 129–145.
