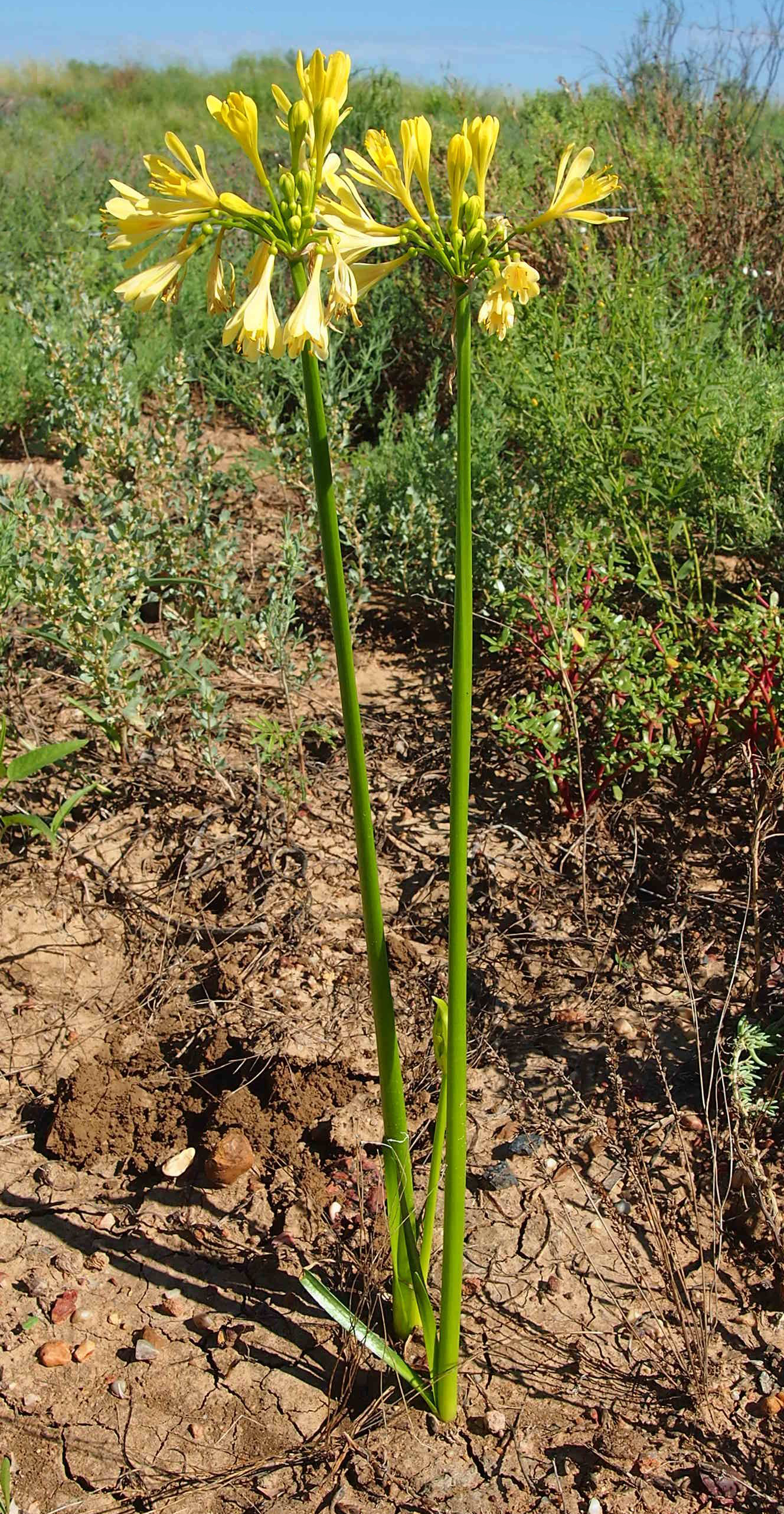

Scientific classification
- Kingdom: Plantae
- Clade: Tracheophytes
- Clade: Angiosperms
- Clade: Monocots
- Order: Asparagales
- Family: Amaryllidaceae
- Subfamily: Amaryllidoideae
- Genus: Calostemma
- Species: C. luteum

Binomial name
- Calostemma luteum Sims

= Calostemma luteum =

Species of plant

Calostemma luteum is a perennial bulbous plant species in the Amaryllis family (Amaryllidaceae). It is native to New South Wales, South Australia and Queensland.

It was first described in 1819 by John Sims, from plants in the botanical garden of the Apothecaries Company, grown from material sent by Barron Field.

== Distribution & habitat ==
In Victoria it is an endangered species, being known only from a single population on the Murray River floodplain. However, it is common in the catchments of the Darling River in New South Wales and Queensland, and on the Murray River floodplain in South Australia.

It is found in woodland and shrubland, on otten seasonally flooded clay flats.

== Gallery ==
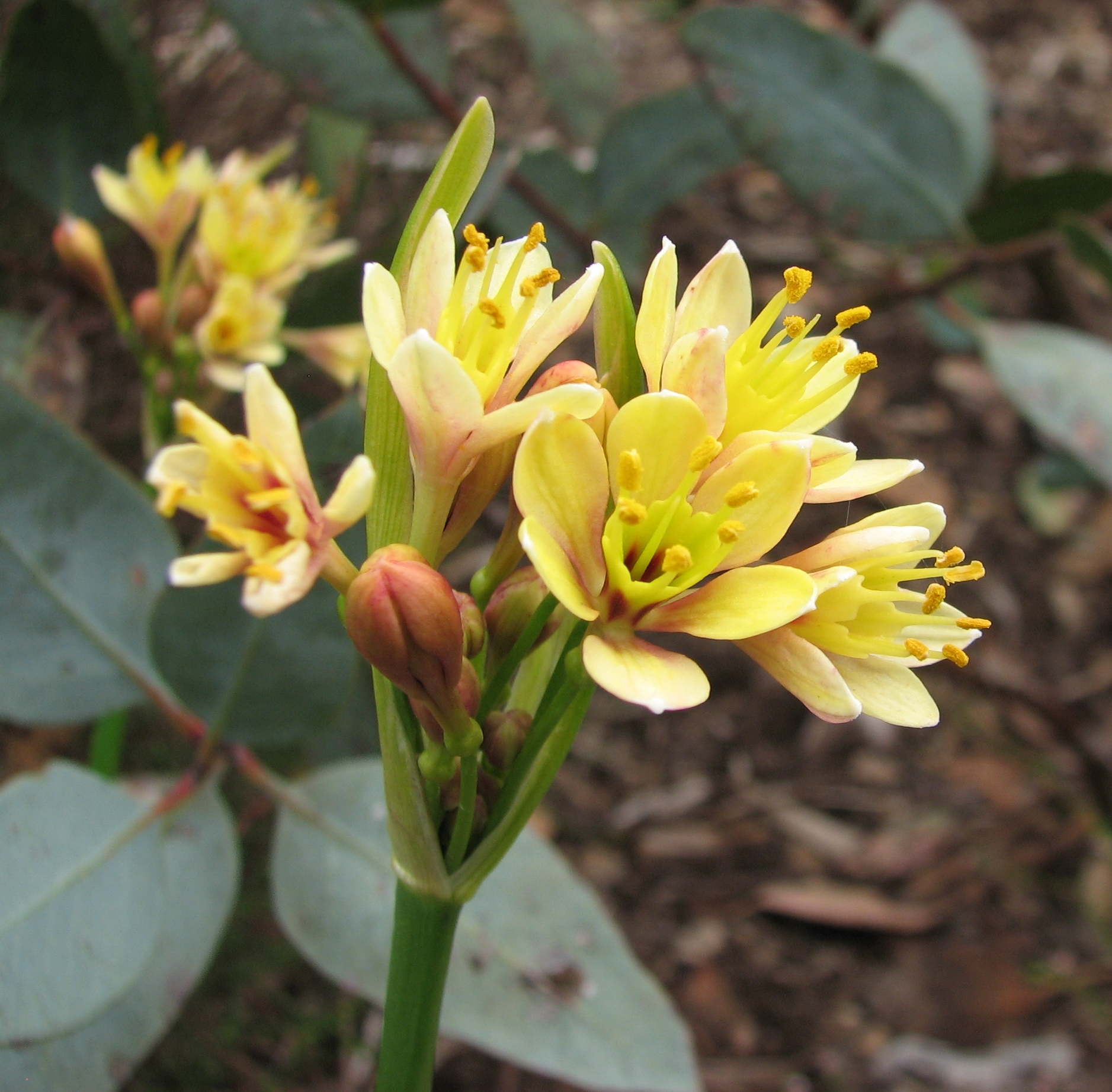

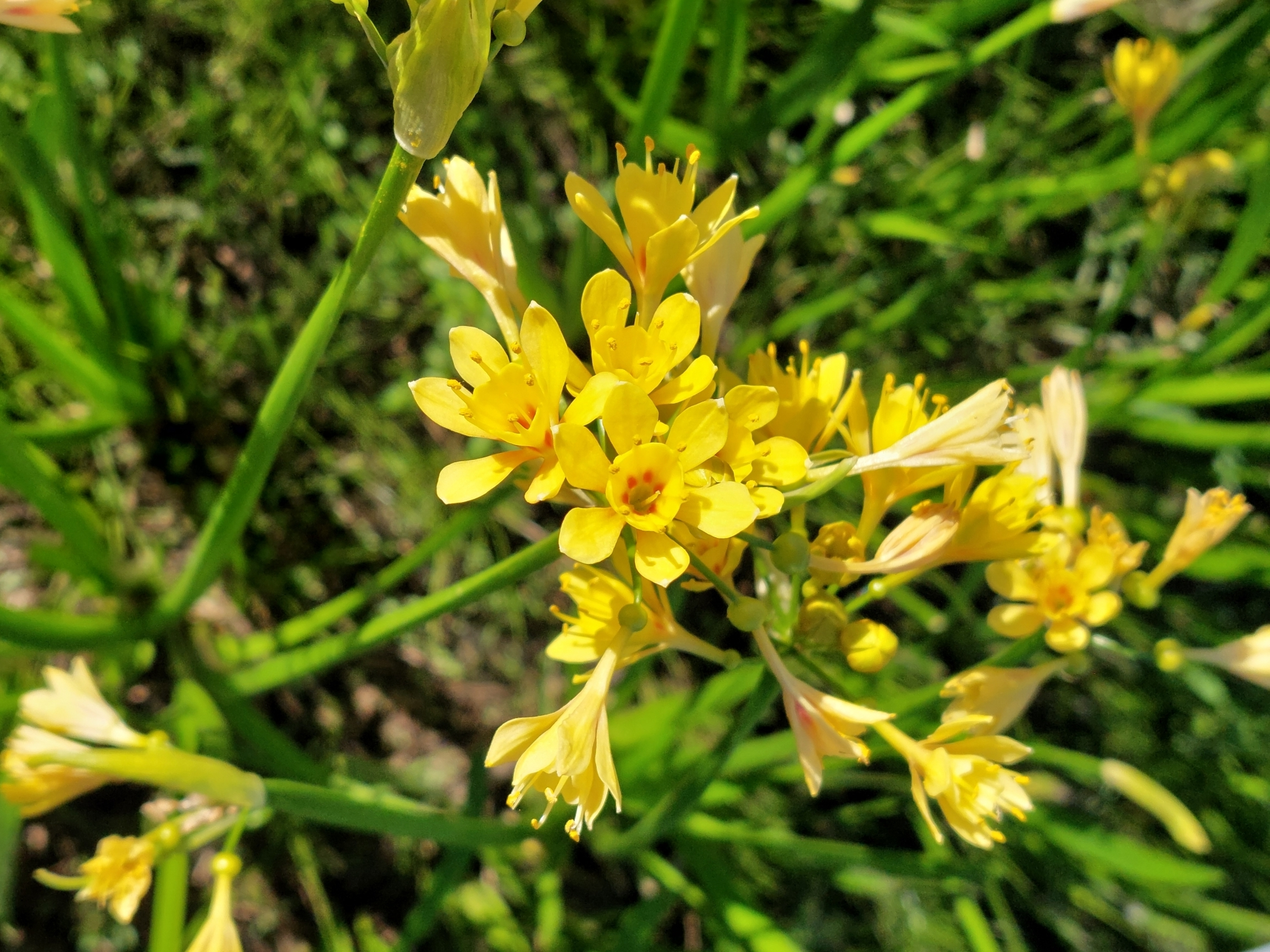

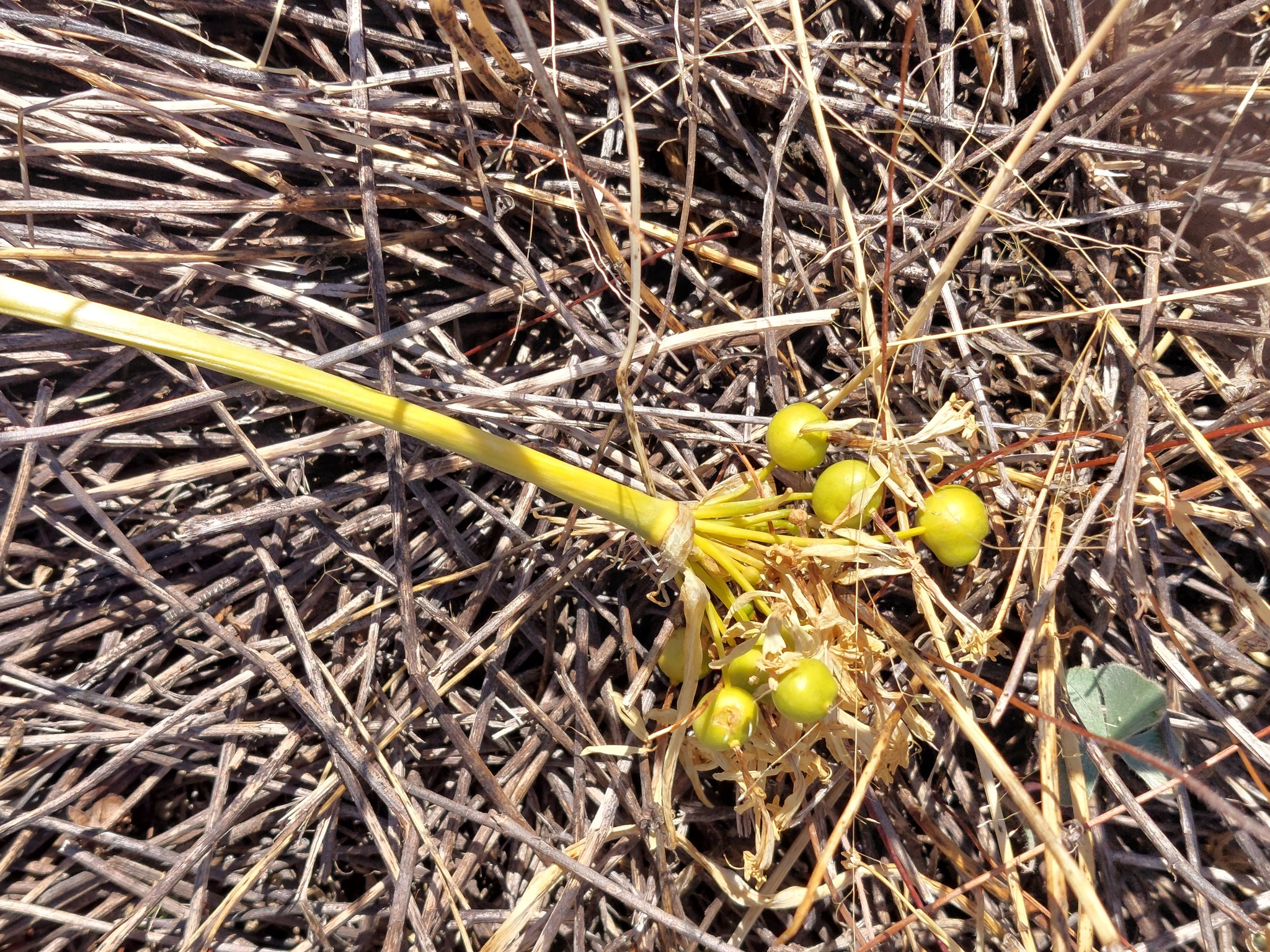

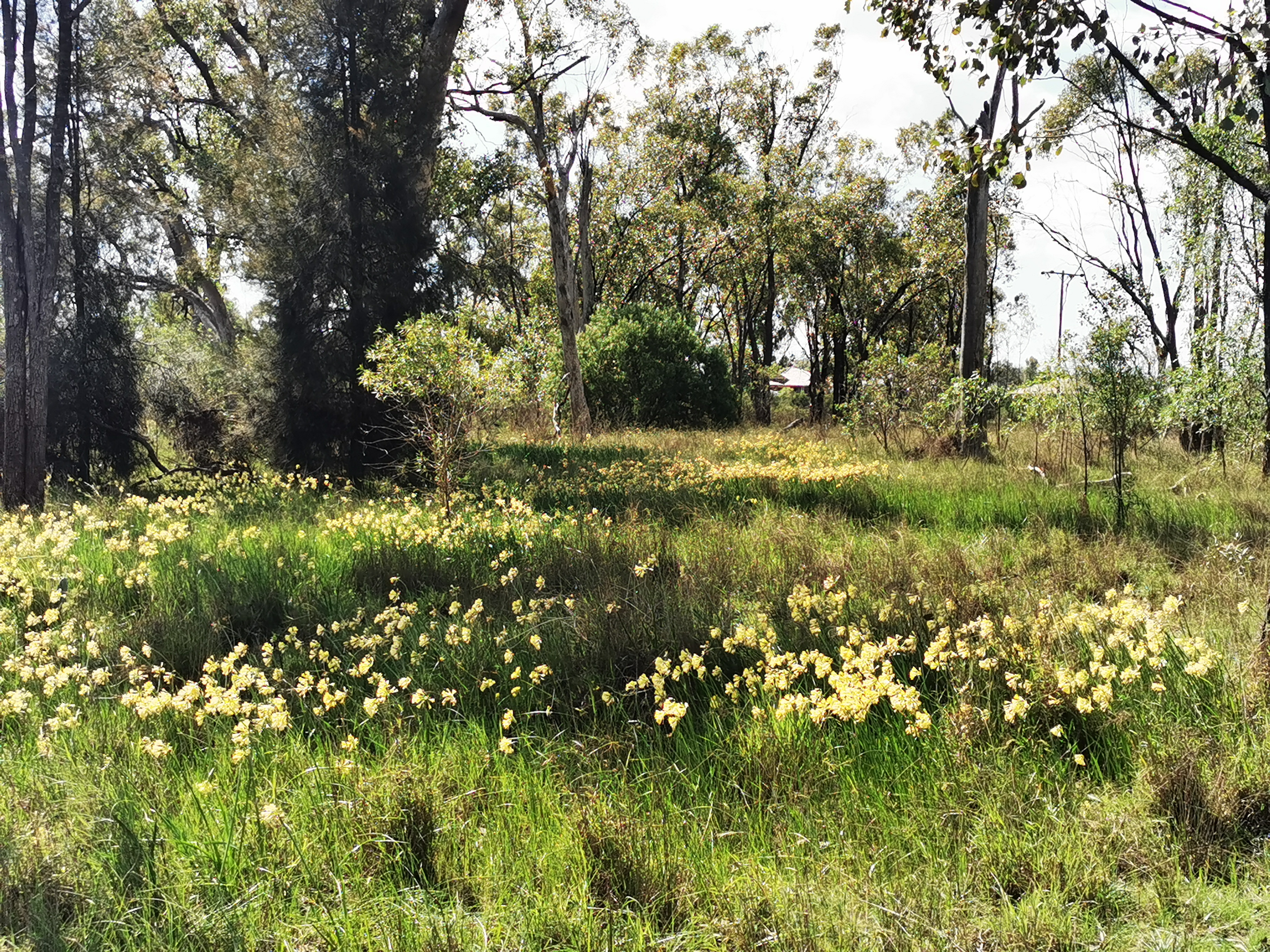
flowering in great swathes after flooding rain, Narrabri, NSW

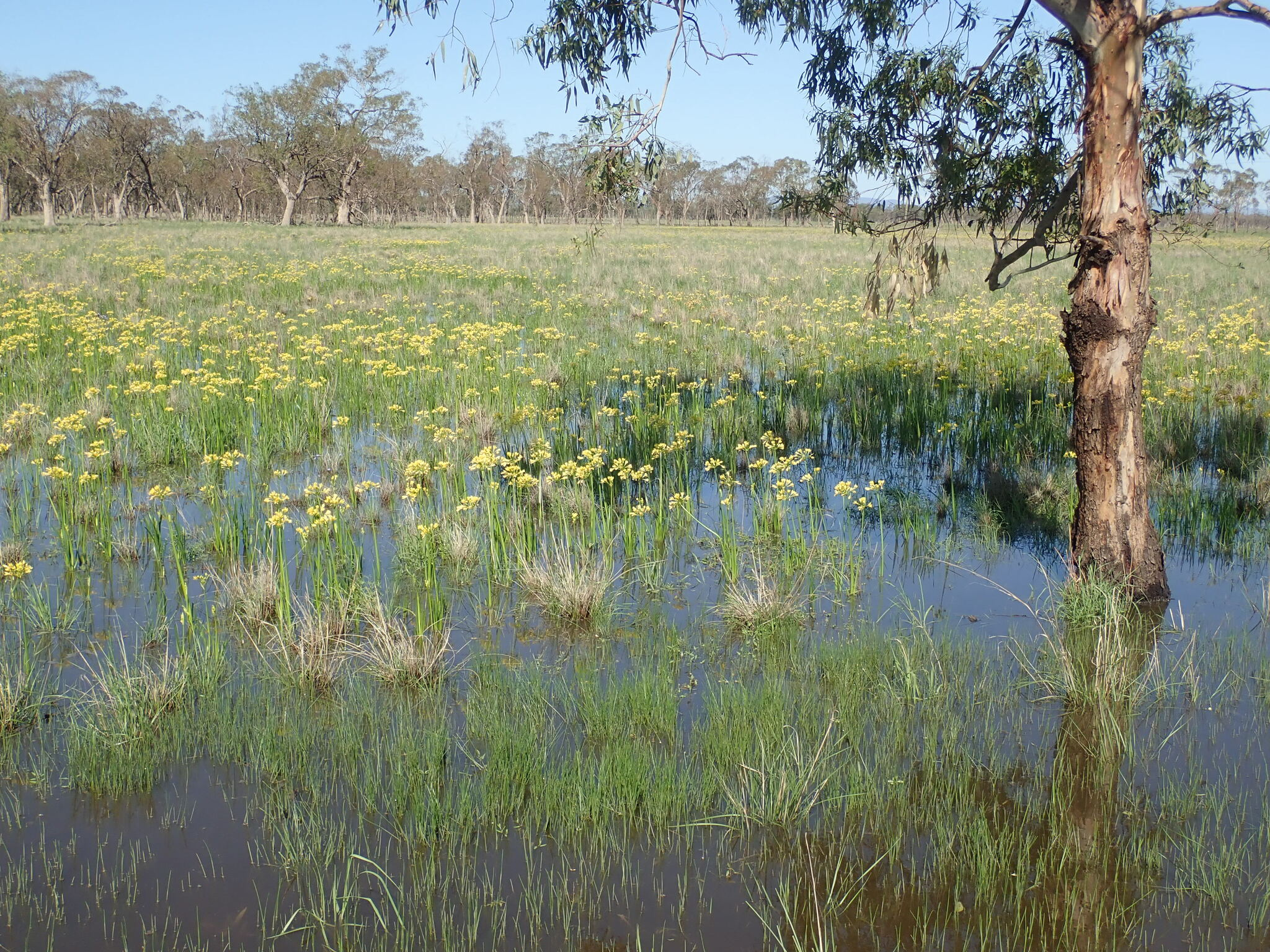
Gunnedah, NSW
