= Charles James Berridge Aldis =

English physician (1808–1872)

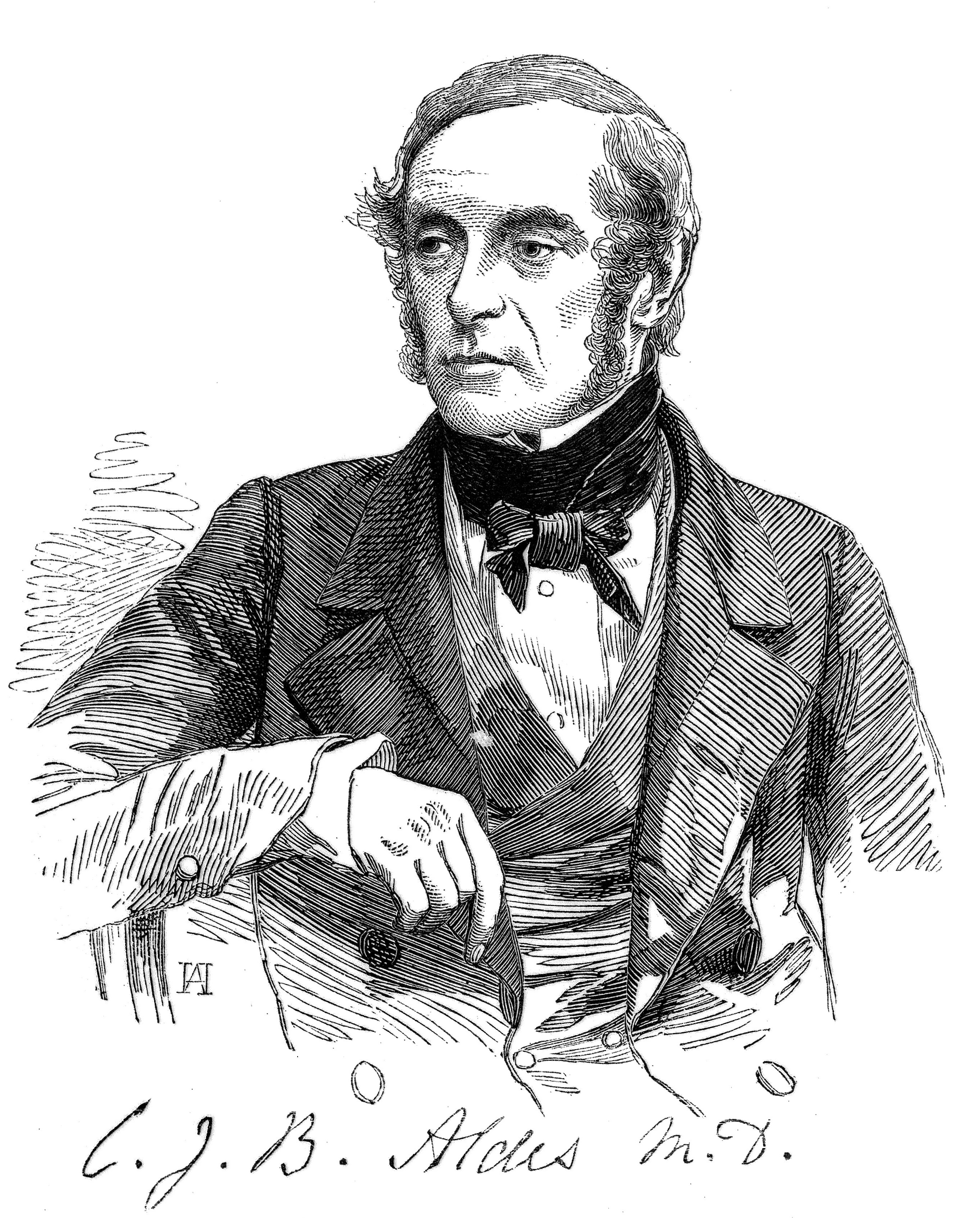
Charles James Berridge Aldis

Charles James Berridge Aldis (16 January 1808 – 26 July 1872) was an English physician, son of Sir Charles Aldis.

== Biography ==
He was born in London on 16 January 1808, and was educated at St Paul's School and Trinity College, Cambridge, graduating B.A. in January 1831. He studied medicine at Addenbrooke's Hospital, Cambridge, and St. George's Hospital, London, and became M.D. Cambridge in 1837, and fellow of the Royal College of Physicians in 1838. He lectured on medicine first at his own house, afterwards at the Hunterian School of Medicine and at the Aldersgate Street School. He was successively physician to the London Dispensary, 1839; the Surrey Dispensary, 1843; the Farringdon Dispensary, 1844; the Western Dispensary, Westminster; and the St. Paul and St. Barnabas Dispensary, Pimlico, founded in 1848. A great part of Aldis's life was occupied in the arduous and unremunerated service of these institutions.

Aldis took great interest in the sanitary condition of great towns, and co-operated with eminent sanitary reformers in drawing attention to the subject. He gave evidence before the Health of Towns Commission, 1844, and by his numerous publications contributed to the improvements which have since been effected. When medical officers of health were appointed under the Metropolis Local Management Act in 1855, Aldis was elected to that office in the parish of St. George's, Hanover Square. He discharged the duties of this office till his death with singular energy and devotion, and set the example of how such work ought to be done. He became well known also for his zeal in carrying out the provisions of the Workshops' Regulation Act as applied to the limitation of hours of work in dressmakers' and similar establishments in London. This field of work he made specially his own, and to no one man is a larger share of credit due for the amelioration which has been effected of late years in the condition of the poor women employed in such businesses. Aldis also took an active part in the Social Science Association, the Association of Medical Officers of Health, and similar bodies, and was in all ways one of the most energetic of medical sanitary reformers. He was an active member of the council of the College of Physicians, and in 1859 was selected to deliver the Harveian Oration (in Latin). He was a man of scholarship and culture. His practical wisdom is shown in a sensible lecture on the power of individuals to resist melancholy, and in other popular lectures.

Notwithstanding his unwearied industry and an integrity of character which won universal respect, it is understood that Aldis was far from prosperous. His life was spent in working and waiting for success which never came. In 1867 a testimonial of substantial value was presented to him by some well-known men interested in philanthropic and sanitary work. He died suddenly of heart disease on 26 July 1872.

== Works ==
He wrote:

- ‘An Introduction to Hospital Practice,’ &c., 8vo, London, 1835 and 1837.
- ‘On the Poisonous Effects of Coal Gas’ in ‘Med. Chir. Trans.’ xlv. 99 and 107.
- ‘On the Power of Individuals to prevent Melancholy in themselves,’ 12mo, London, 1860.
- ‘Lecture on the Sanitary Condition of Large Towns and of Belgravia,’ 12mo, London, 1857.
- ‘Oratio ex Harveii Instituto,’ 4to, London, 1859.

He also drew up numerous reports on the sanitary condition of London, and contributed papers to the medical journals.
