= Thoresby House =

Demolished building in Hoxton, London

Coordinates: 51.560°N 0.086°W

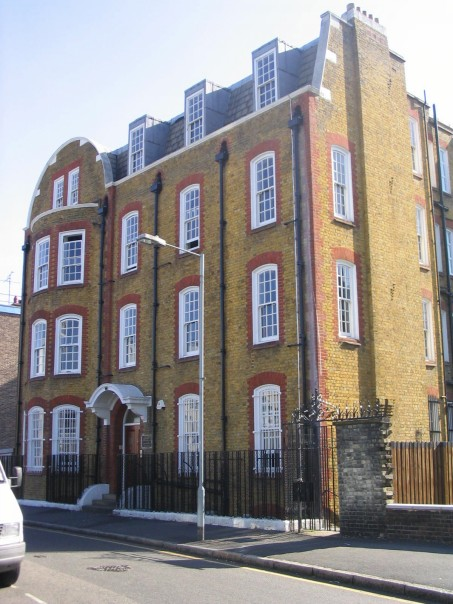
- Thoresby House
- Interactive map of the Thoresby House area

General information
- Type: Student accommodation
- Architectural style: Edwardian Period
- Location: Hackney, London, 1 Thoresby Street; London, United Kingdom; N1 7TQ
- Owner: Arcadia University
- Landlord: Arcadia University, The College of Global Studies

Thoresby House was a building in Hoxton, London, on the border of Islington. Originally built in the early 20th century as accommodation for nurses at the Royal Chest Hospital, it was demolished in the 2020s. It was the sole surviving building of the hospital after the rest of the site was redeveloped as the Buxton Court housing estate, following heavy bombing in the London Blitz.

From 1997 the building was used as student accommodation by Arcadia University; at one point it was one of three halls of residence in London owned by the university's College of Global Studies. It was used for participants in the university's study abroad programme.

In 2020 planning consent was given to replace the building with a new 12-storey accommodation block, also called Thoresby House.
