= Arcadia University =

University in Glenside, Pennsylvania, US

- Former names: Beaver Female Seminary (1853–1872); Beaver College (1872–2001)
- Type: Private university
- Established: 1853; 173 years ago
- Endowment: $63.4 million (2025)
- President: Ajay Nair
- Provost: Jeff Rutenbeck
- Students: 3,026
- Location: Cheltenham Township (Glenside mailing address), Pennsylvania, United States; 40.0920°N 75.1655°W
- Campus: 94 acres (380,000 m^{2})
- Colors: Scarlet and Grey
- Nickname: Knights
- Sporting affiliations: NCAA Division III (MAC Freedom Conference)
- Mascot: Archie
- Website: arcadia.edu
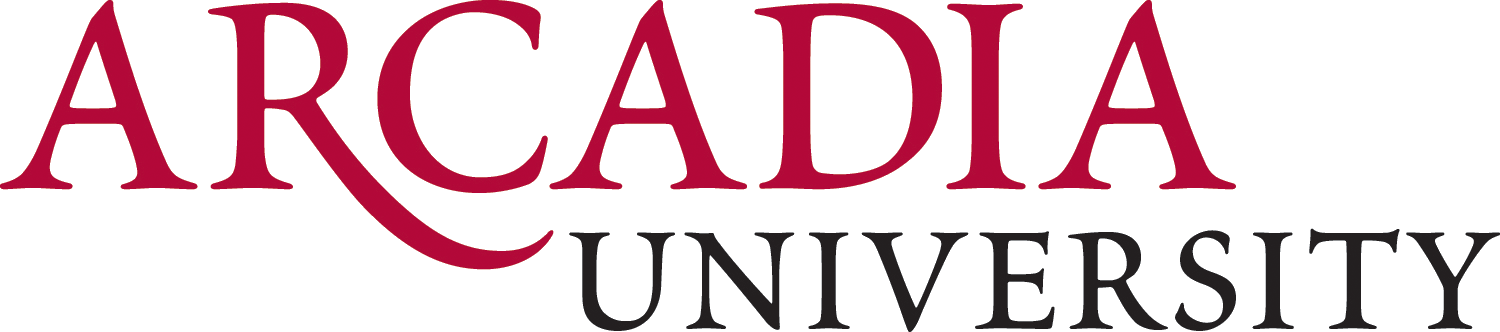

Arcadia University is a private university in Cheltenham Township, Pennsylvania, United States, with a Glenside mailing address. The university enrolls approximately 3,200 undergraduate, master's, and doctoral students. The 94-acre (380,000 m^{2}) Glenside campus features Grey Towers Castle, a National Historic Landmark; the university also includes a campus in Christiana, Delaware, as well as several centers around the world.

== History ==
=== Beaver Female Seminary ===
Arcadia's history began in 1853 with two students, Sylvania Jones and Juliet A. Poundstone, who left their family homes in Lafayette County, Pennsylvania, to pursue an education. The students accompanied Sheridan Baker, principal at the Brownsville School they had attended, to the newly chartered Beaver Female Seminary in Beaver, Pennsylvania.

Led by Baker, Beaver taught liberal arts, ancient history, rhetoric, logic, and analogy. In 1872 the school renamed itself Beaver College and Musical Institute.

=== Beaver College ===
In the late 19th century, the college became coeducational for the first time. In 1907, Beaver College and Musical Institute was simplified to Beaver College. Enrollment was again limited to women.

In 1925, the college moved east across Pennsylvania to Jenkintown, Pennsylvania, to the Beechwood Hall estate. This location afforded larger facilities, an adequate campus, and greater development opportunities, increasing enrollment but maintaining the advantages of a small college. In 1928, the trustees secured a nearby estate in Glenside, Pennsylvania. This spacious property offered unique stone buildings, including the now iconic Grey Towers Castle. Its former main building in Beaver is currently in use as College Square Elementary School in the Beaver Area School District.

Beaver College constructed eight new campus buildings, established the Center for Education Abroad, and, in 1973, became coeducational again. In the mid-1960s the institution consolidated all campuses to Glenside.

In 1985, Bette E. Landman was appointed president, the first female president in the institution's history. Her tenure saw the dedication of the Kuch Athletic and Recreation Center, the establishment of Preview, joining the NCAA Division III, and, in 1992, membership of the Pennsylvania Athletic Conference. Under her leadership, Beaver College achieved university status and was led through the transition from Beaver College to Arcadia University.

=== Arcadia University ===
On November 20, 2000, it was announced that Beaver College would become Arcadia University. The official change of name and status occurred at a formal ceremony on July 16, 2001. During the first quarter of the 21st century, the university established six academic colleges and schools, including the College of Global Studies as the first college of a university dedicated to international education.

In July 2022, the university expanded its campus size, purchasing 125 Royal Avenue, the site of the former Bishop McDevitt High School.

== Campus ==
The university is in Cheltenham Township. It has its own census-designated place, named Arcadia University, and some university property extends into the Glenside CDP. The university has a Glenside mailing address.

== Academics ==
=== Undergraduate programs ===
The university offers over 75 different fields of study in its undergraduate programs. Undergraduate majors are offered through the College of Arts & Sciences, College of Health Sciences, School of Education, and the School of Global Business.

=== Graduate programs ===
Graduate and professional studies at Arcadia University range from liberal arts to professional degree programs. In May 2023, Arcadia launched fully redesigned hybrid and fully online graduate programs. The Doctor in Physical Therapy program can now be completed in hybrid mode of delivery, combining engaging online sessions, on-campus immersions, and hands-on clinical experiences to allow students across the country to earn their DPT without relocating. The School of Global Business’ online MBA program consists of a business core and a specialization in one of three concentrations.

== Student life ==
=== Athletics ===
Arcadia athletics wordmark

Arcadia University teams compete in the NCAA Division III within the MAC Freedom of the Middle Atlantic Conference.

Men's and women's sports teams include ice hockey, track and field, baseball, softball, basketball, cross country, field hockey, golf, lacrosse, soccer, swimming, tennis, and volleyball. In 2025, the university has announced the addition of men's and women's wrestling, along with men's and women's fencing.

Arcadia also competes in esports leagues for games including Overwatch, Valorant, Rocket League, Hearthstone, and Super Smash Bros.

== Affiliates ==
=== Alumni ===
- Anil Beephan Jr., New York State Assembly member
- Julianne Boyd, former theater director
- William Evanina, former director of the U.S. National Counterintelligence and Security Center
- Catherine Gunsalus González, religious author and professor emerita at Columbia Theological Seminary
- Joe McKeehen, former World Series of Poker champion
- Dorothy Germain Porter, amateur golf champion
- Abbey Ryan, artist (painter)
- M. Susan Savage, Secretary of State of Oklahoma and former Mayor of Tulsa, Oklahoma
- Edith Schaeffer, religious author and co-founder of the L'Abri study center
- Oliver B. Shallenberger, electrical engineer
- Anna Deavere Smith, actress
- Marjorie Smith, New Hampshire state legislator
- Florence Wickham, contralto and composer
- Cosmo DiNardo, perpetrator of the July 2017 Pennsylvania murders / (attended Arcadia University for one semester in 2015)

== See also ==
- Thoresby House
