= Charles Aldis =

English surgeon

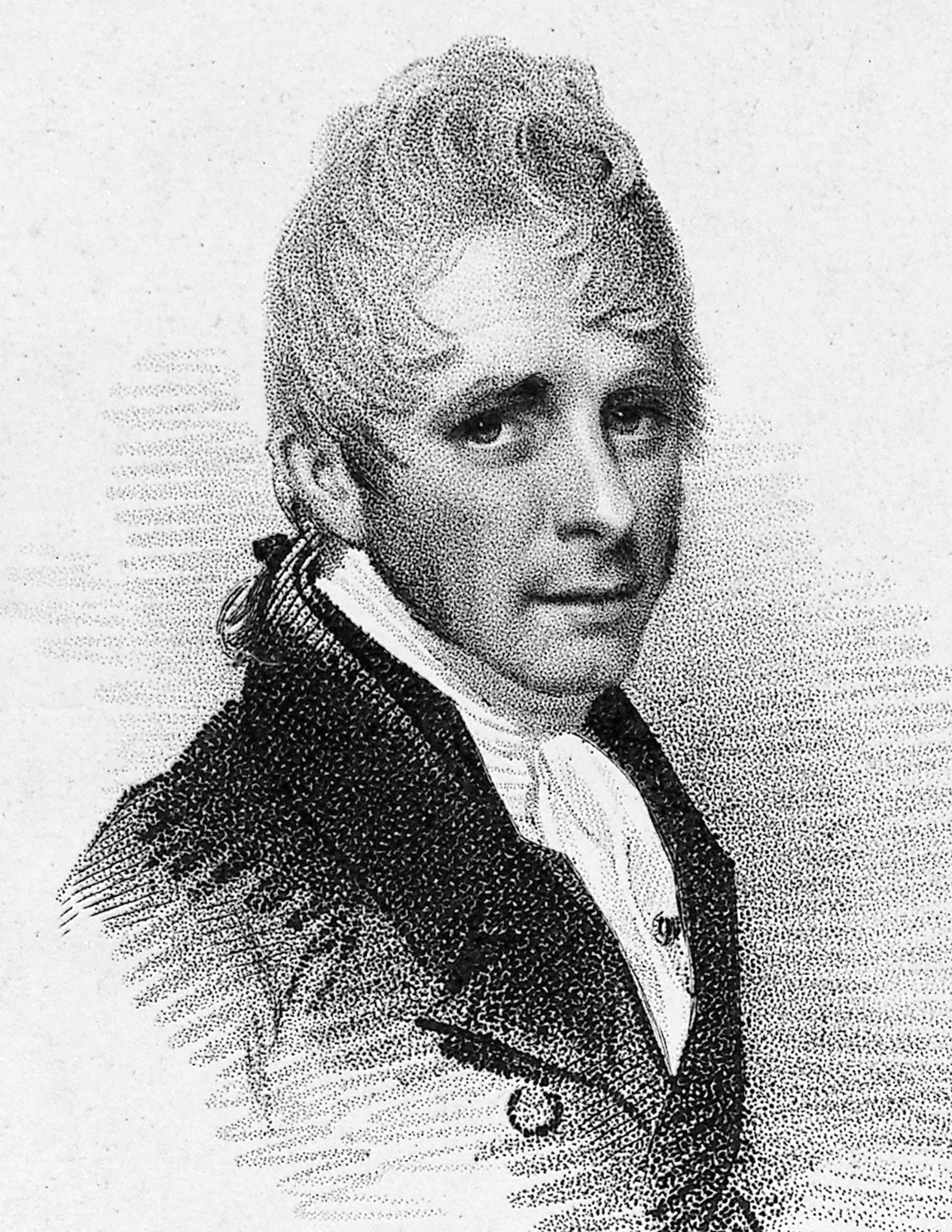
Sir Charles Aldis

Sir Charles Aldis (16 March 1776 – 28 March 1863) was an English surgeon. His son, Charles James Berridge Aldis, was also a physician.

Aldis was born in Aslacton, Norfolk, the seventh son and one of twenty two children of Daniel Aldis, a medical practitioner, and Mary Dix. He came to London in 1794 and studied at Guy's and Bartholomew's Hospitals. In 1797 or 1798 he was made surgeon to the sick and wounded prisoners of war at Norman Cross barracks, Huntingdonshire (where from 10,000 to 12,000 French and Dutch prisoners were then detained). In 1800 he moved to Hertford, where he introduced vaccination into three parishes in spite of opposition from the doctors, but in 1802 began to practise in London, and in 1803 became a member of the College of Surgeons. He was surgeon to the New Finsbury Dispensary, and founded a special hospital, called the Glandular Institution for the Cure of Cancer, in Clifford Street. Charles Aldis was known as an antiquary as well as a surgeon. He died at his London home, 13 Old Burlington Street, on 28 March 1863.

Aldis was knighted in 1821, in somewhat unusual circumstances. His entry in The Knights of England (1906) indicates that his knighthood along with one other was deemed to be "surreptitiously obtained", and there was some question as to whether they should be listed. Some contemporary reports suggest that he had gained his knighthood by attending a royal levee, falsely presenting himself as attending for a knighthood, and being dubbed by the King before the deception was realised. The title was not revoked, but the situation was regarded with some distrust by many of his contemporaries; the College of Surgeons struck his name off the list of members as a result.

== Works ==
He wrote: "Observations on the Nature and Treatment of Glandular Diseases, especially those denominated Cancer," pp. 116, London, 1820, 8vo, and subsequently; also papers in "Defence of Vaccination," &c.; an "Essay on the too frequent Use of the Trephine;" on the "British System of Education;" and many articles in periodicals.
