= Bette E. Landman =

American academic administrator (1937–2025)

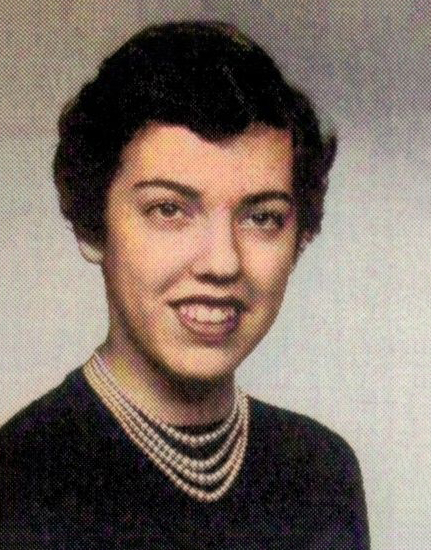
- Landman in 1955

18th President of Arcadia University
- In office 1985–2004
- Preceded by: Bruce Wilson
- Succeeded by: Jerry Greiner

Personal details
- Born: Bette Emeline Landman; July 18, 1937 Piqua, Ohio, U.S.
- Died: October 16, 2025 (aged 88) Abington, Pennsylvania, U.S.
- Education: Bowling Green State University; Ohio State University

Bette Emeline Landman (July 18, 1937 – October 16, 2025) was an American anthropologist and academic administrator who served as the 18th president of Arcadia University from 1985 to 2004. As the institution's first female president, she took over when the college was facing financial distress and, during her 19-year tenure, doubled enrollment to over 3,000 students, increased the endowment from $267,000 to $26 million, and oversaw its 2001 transition from Beaver College to Arcadia University.

== Early life ==
Bette Emeline Landman was born in Piqua, Ohio, on July 18, 1937, the middle of three children with an older sister, Patricia, and a younger brother, Todd. Shortly after her birth, the family moved to San Francisco. Her parents' marriage was troubled, and her father became the primary parental influence during her first decade, which included a period living with her great-aunts in Ohio. Landman later stated that these formative years shaped her core values, which were heavily influenced by her father's emphasis on honesty and intellectual curiosity.

The family faced financial hardship after her father was severely injured when Landman was eleven. To help support herself, she began working at age ten, buying her own clothes and school supplies with money from babysitting and, later, a department store job.

== Education ==
Landman had not planned to attend college until two high school teachers recommended her for a full teaching scholarship. She completed her undergraduate studies in two years and two summers, graduating in 1959 from Bowling Green State University, where she was first in her class and summa cum laude with a B.S. in elementary education.

Her entry into graduate studies in anthropology at Ohio State University (OSU) was the result of a chance encounter. Landman earned a M.A. in physical anthropology in 1961 and a doctorate in cultural anthropology in 1972, both from OSU. Her master's thesis was titled, "The Adjustment of the Primate Vertebral Column to Upright Posture." She received fellowships from the Wenner-Gren Foundation for Anthropological Research in 1963, the National Science Foundation, and an OSU Fellowship in 1960.

The title of her Ph.D. dissertation was Household and Community in Canouan, British West Indies. In an autobiographical essay, Landman wrote that the completion of her doctorate was delayed by six years. She attributed this in part to switching advisors; her original advisor terminated his role when she did not respond to his "indirect request for an intimate relationship." She completed her dissertation in 1972 under the guidance of her new advisor, Erika Bourguignon.

Later in her career, she participated in the Harvard Graduate School of Education's Institute for Educational Management.

== Career ==
From 1957 to 1960, Landman taught fifth grade at Worthington Public Schools in Worthington, Ohio. In 1963, she joined the faculty of Springfield College as an instructor in anthropology. Her tenure there was divided by her fieldwork. Landman served as an instructor from 1963 to 1965 and was promoted to assistant professor for the 1966 to 1967 academic year. She conducted a preliminary field trip in the summer of 1964 and her primary doctoral fieldwork in Canouan and Saint Vincent from September 1965 to May 1966. Her research focused on marriage, childrearing, and family organization in a community with a significant gender imbalance caused by male emigration. Landman was an instructor of anthropology at Temple University from 1967 to 1971.

In 1971, Landman joined Beaver College as an assistant professor of anthropology. In 1973, she received the Christian R. and Mary F. Lindback Award for Distinguished Teaching. Her career in administration began in 1976 when she was promoted to dean of students. In 1980, she became vice president of student affairs. She first served as acting president in 1982 and again after her successor's brief tenure.

In May 1985, Landman was appointed acting president following the resignation of Bruce Wilson. She was later named the 18th president of Beaver College, becoming the institution's first female president. Landman served in the role for 19 years, retiring in 2004. Her presidency marked a period of growth for the institution. She doubled student enrollment to over 3,000, increased the endowment from $267,000 to $26 million, and oversaw the construction of seven new buildings. In 1992, Landman was named a Distinguished Daughter of Pennsylvania, and the Pennsylvania chapter of the American Council on Education (ACE) created an award in her name to honor leaders in women's education. She strengthened the liberal arts program, expanded international study programs, and worked to diversify the student body. Key moments during her leadership include navigating an eight-month maintenance staff strike in 1993 and initiating the institution's name change from Beaver College to Arcadia University in 2001. In 2003, she received a lifetime achievement award from the Pennsylvania Council on International Education.

Landman served as chair of the board of directors for the Association of American Colleges and held board presidencies for the Commission for Independent Colleges and Universities and the Association of Presbyterian Colleges and Universities. Her board memberships also included ACE, the National Association of Independent Colleges and Universities, Abington Memorial Hospital, and Wilson College. Landman was a member of the Philadelphia Alliance for Teaching Humanities in Schools, the ACE Pennsylvania State Planning Council, and the Metropolitan Collegiate Center of Germantown.

Landman contributed an autobiographical essay, "Nurturing Chance: An Accidental Life," to the 1996 book Against the Tide: Career Paths of Women Leaders in American and British Higher Education.

Upon her retirement in 2004, she was succeeded as president by Jerry M. Greiner. In recognition of her service, Arcadia University named its library in her honor, awarded her an honorary doctorate of education, and created the Bette Landman Award for students. In 2009, she was inducted into Arcadia's Athletics Hall of Fame.

== Death ==
Landman died at Jefferson Abington Hospital on October 16, 2025, at the age of 88.
