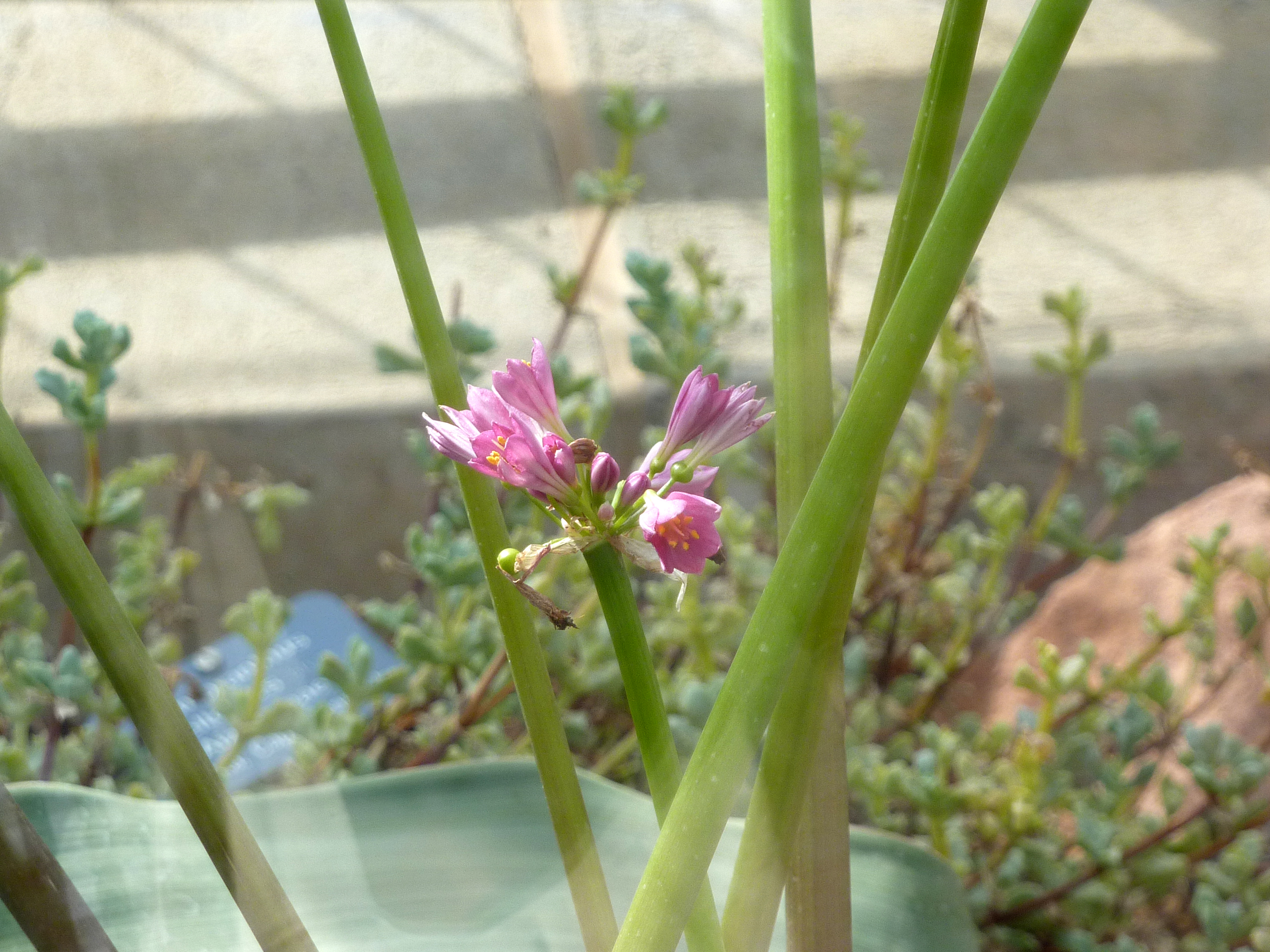

Scientific classification
- Kingdom: Plantae
- Clade: Embryophytes
- Clade: Tracheophytes
- Clade: Spermatophytes
- Clade: Angiosperms
- Clade: Monocots
- Order: Asparagales
- Family: Amaryllidaceae
- Subfamily: Amaryllidoideae
- Genus: Calostemma
- Species: C. purpureum

Binomial name
- Calostemma purpureum R.Br.
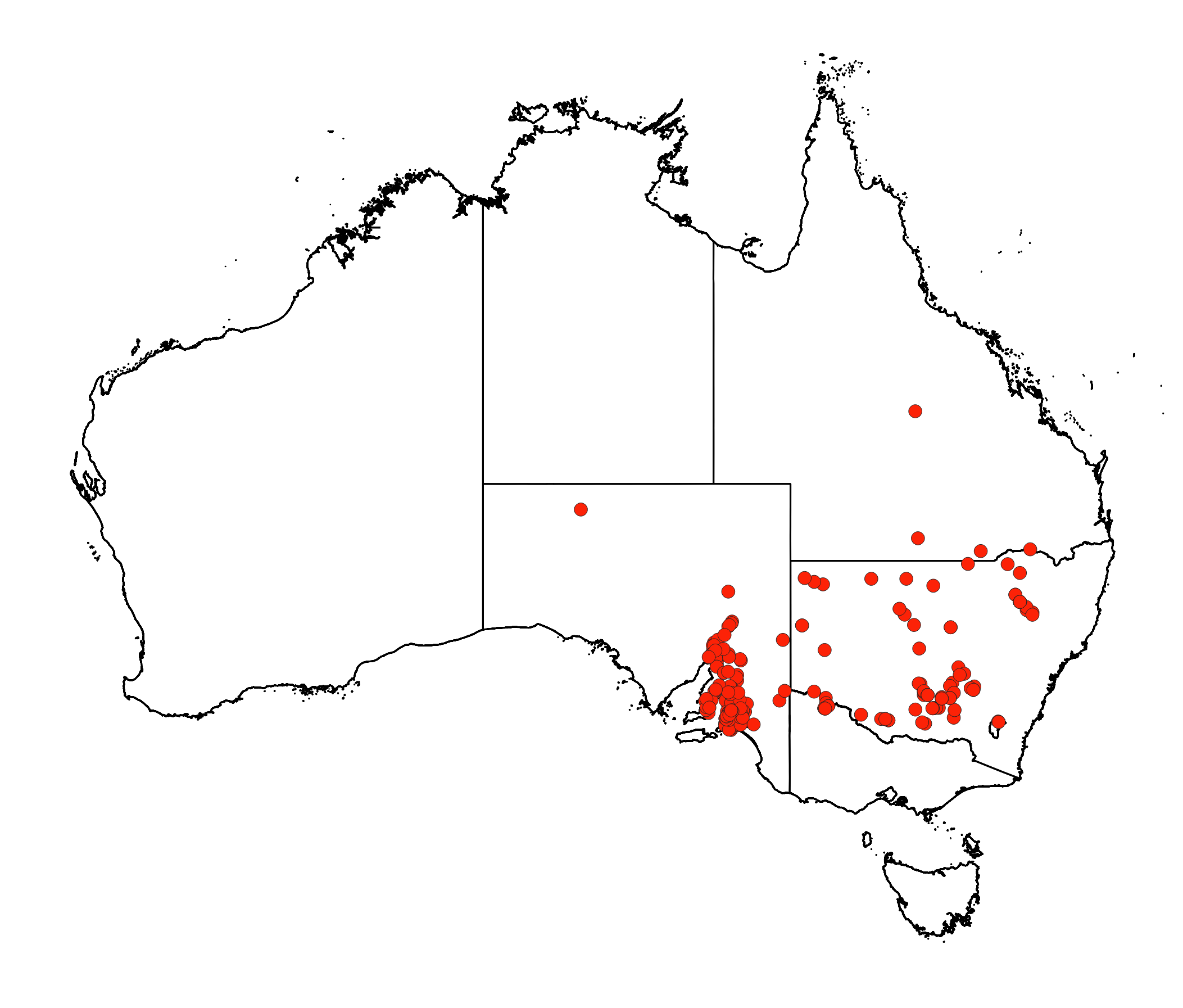
- Occurrence data from AVH

Synonyms
- Calostemma lutea

= Calostemma purpureum =

Species of plant

Calostemma purpureum, the garland lily, is a long-lived perennial flowering plant that is native to South Australia, Victoria and New South Wales. Flowers may be cream, yellow, pink or purple. Related to the common daffodil, garland lilies were once common in large colonies in grassy areas, in particular the plain on which the city of Adelaide now stands. Due to urbanisation and grazing, the garland lily is now rare, only occurring in small pockets in parks on the outskirts of the city.

Leaves form from the bulb during winter, and die off during spring. The plant flowers during summer when there are no leaves. Calostemma purpureum bursts into flower in the midst of the heat of an Australian summer, when most other plants are not flowering. The flowers are purple-pink in colour forming in an umbel of 5-10 showy flowers. They appear on a stalk around 30 centimetres long. The flowers are replaced in autumn by clusters of large, berry-like seeds. The seeds may germinate while still on the plant. They germinate very readily but it may take three or four years before the new plant first flowers.

== Image gallery ==
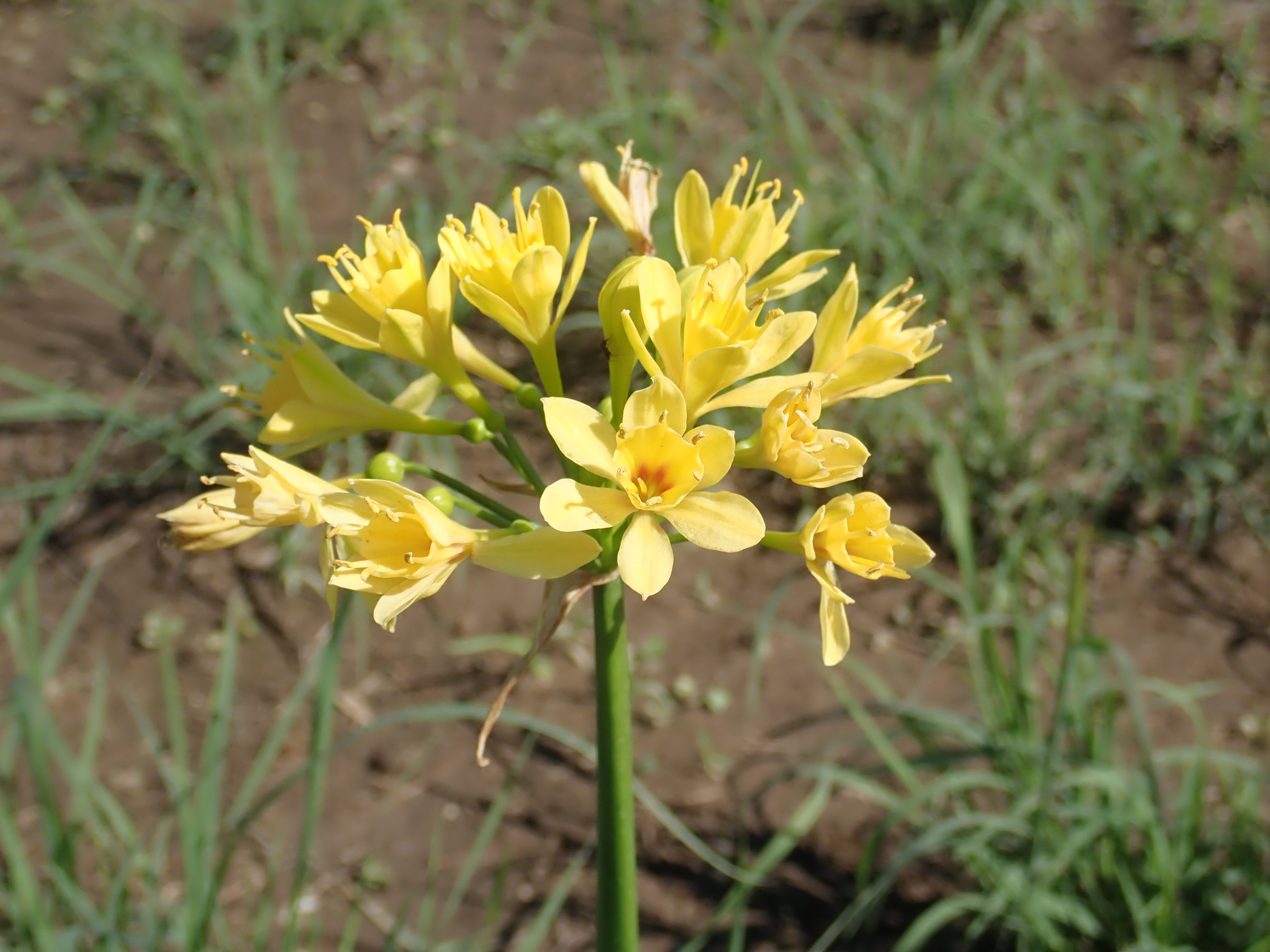
Flower head

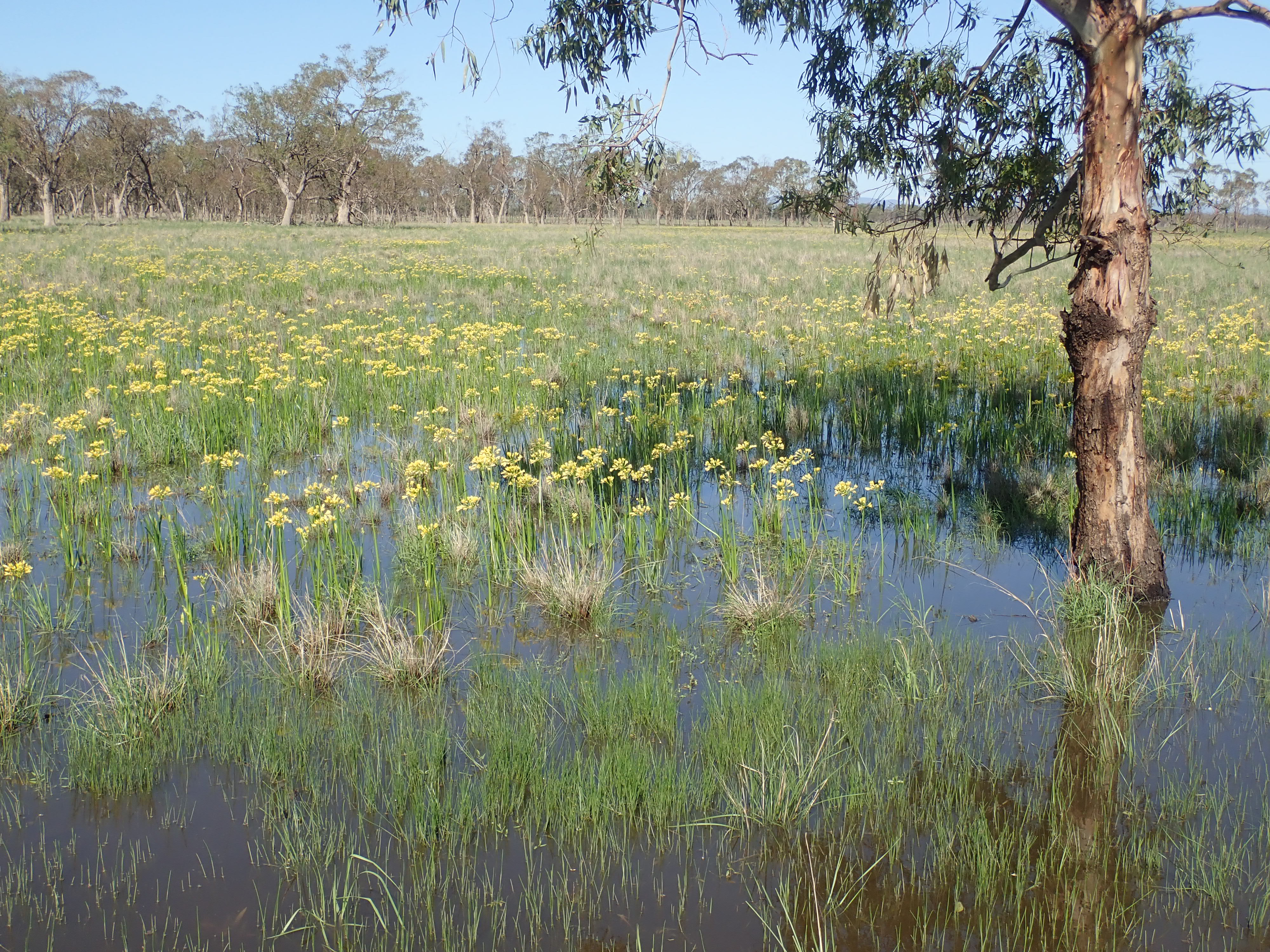
Large colony near Gunnedah, NSW

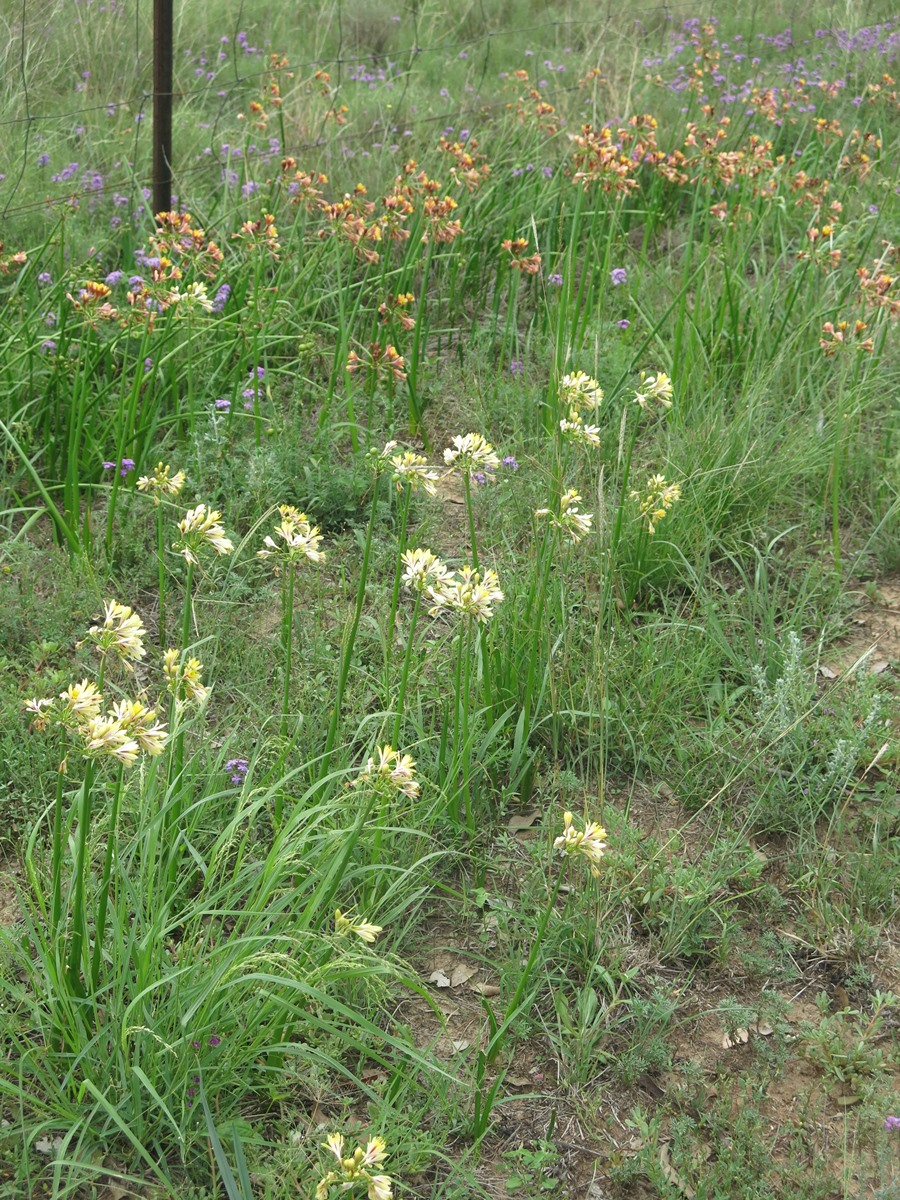
Differently coloured flowers

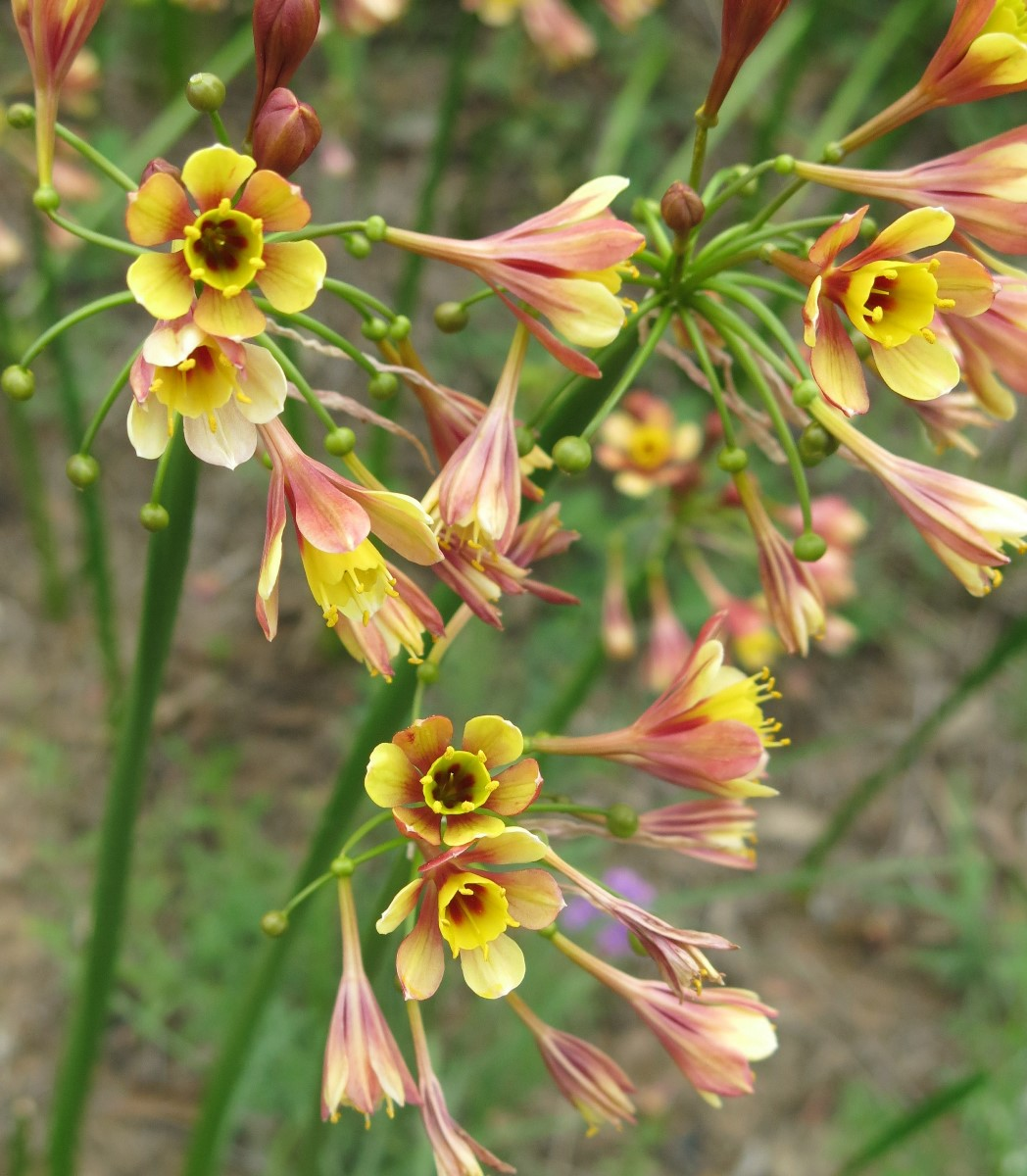
Bicoloured flowers

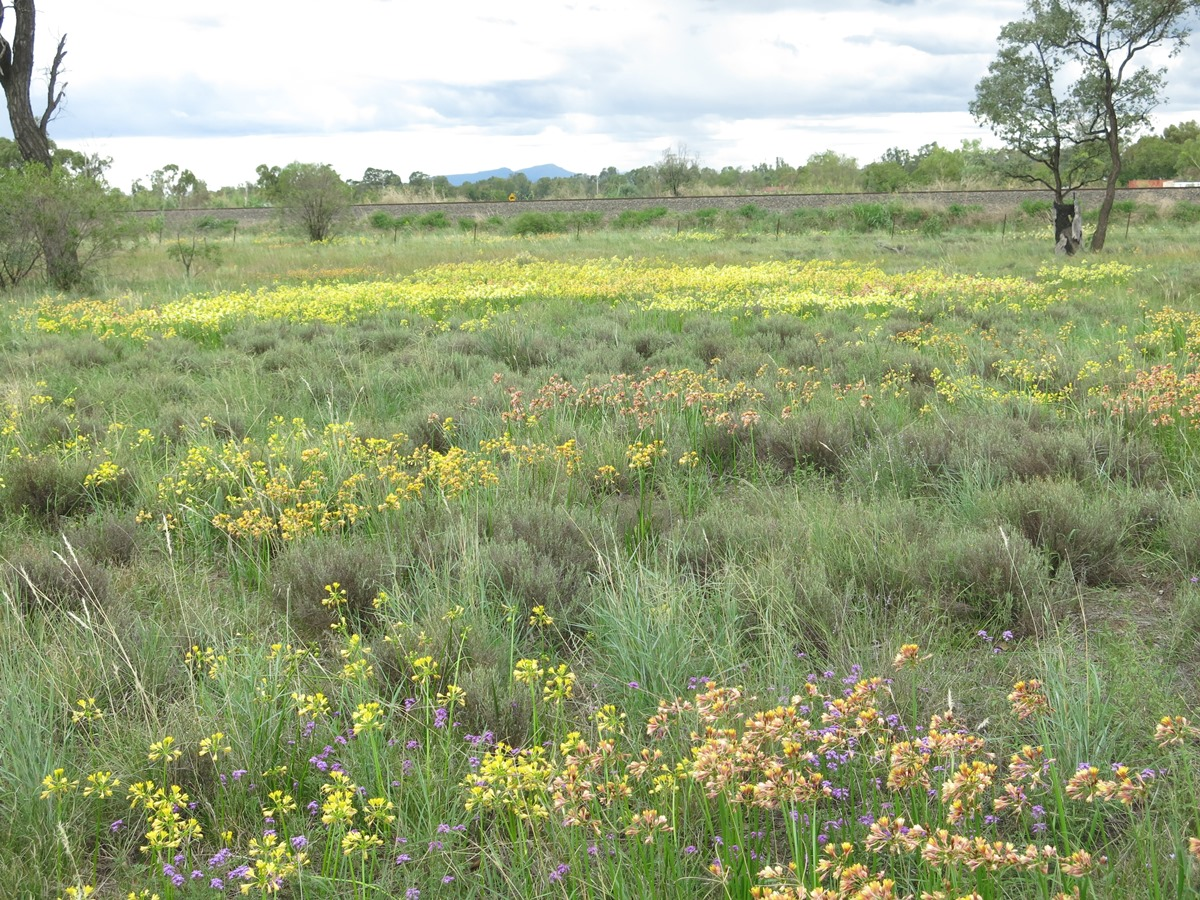
Field of mixed colours

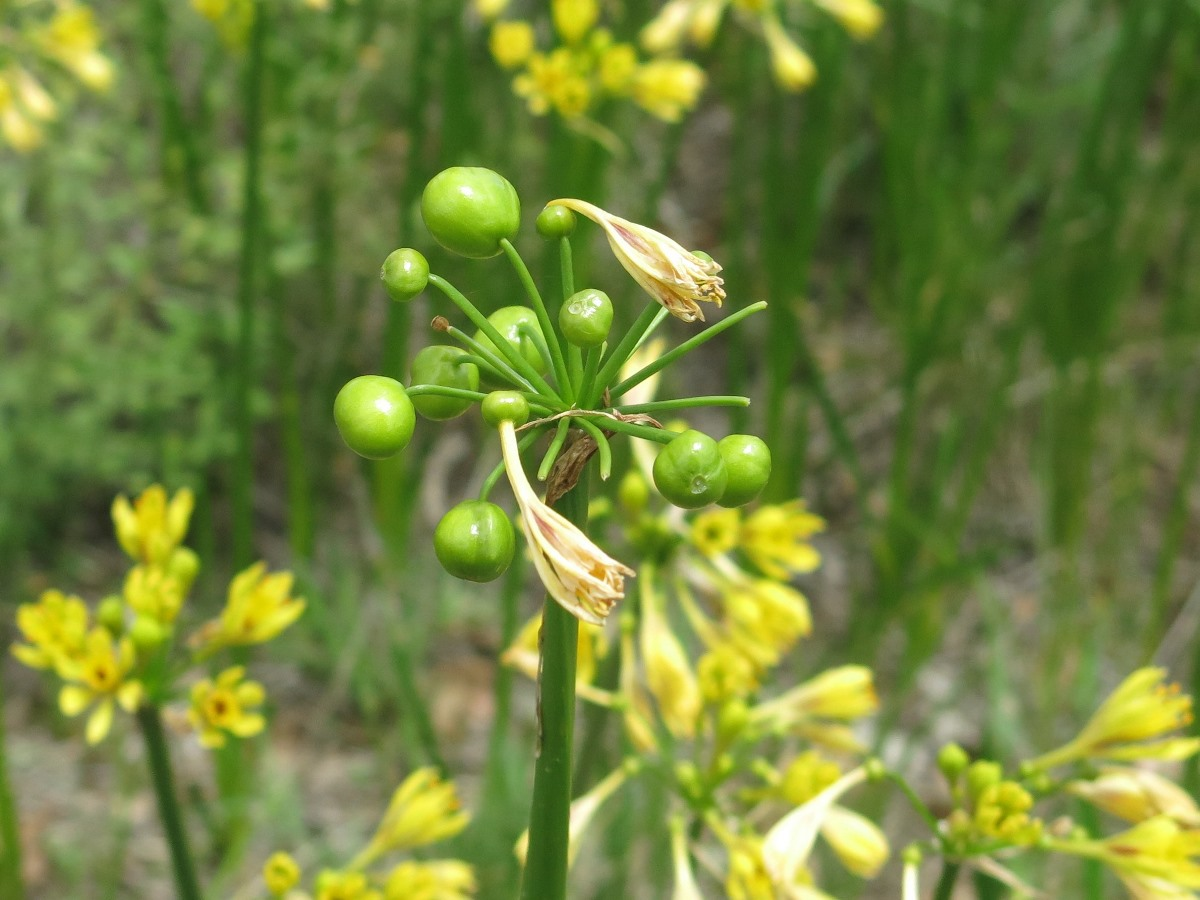
Developing fruit
