= Edward Brockbank =

Edward Mansfield Brockbank
- Born: 3 March 1866; Geelong, Victoria, Australia
- Died: 2 January 1959 (aged 92)
- Education: Owens College, Manchester (MD)
- Occupations: Physician, cardiologist, medical historian
- Known for: Work at Manchester Royal Infirmary; medical writings and biographies
- Spouse: Mary Ellwood Brockbank
- Children: 5 (including William Brockbank)
- Awards: Member of the Order of the British Empire (MBE)

Edward Mansfield Brockbank MBE (3 March 1866 - 2 January 1959) was a cardiologist and surgeon closely associated with the Manchester Royal Infirmary. He was a prolific author of medical textbooks and works of medical history and biography and contributed a number of articles to the Dictionary of National Biography.

== Early life and family ==
Edward Brockbank was born in Geelong, Australia, on 3 March 1866, to John Thomas Brockbank, a metal merchant, and Charlotte Sadler. Of Quaker background, he was taken to England at the age of 4 and educated at the Bootham School, York, and Owens College, Manchester, later known as the Victoria University of Manchester, from where he received the degree of Doctor of Medicine in 1890.

Brockbank married his first cousin, Mary Ellwood Brockbank, in 1899. There were two daughters and three sons from the marriage. Their son William (1900-1984) also became a physician and medical historian.

== Career ==
Brockbank had resident posts at the Manchester Royal Infirmary (MRI) and Birmingham General Hospital. He was also a junior physician at the Royal Children's Hospital. After that he returned to the MRI as honorary assistant physician and lecturer in materia medica. In 1912 he was appointed lecturer in clinical medicine and dean of medical studies.

He was made a member of the Order of the British Empire for his work on the prevention of cancer in mule spinners.

He was a prolific author of medical textbooks and works of medical history and wrote medical biographies for the Dictionary of National Biography.

== Death and legacy ==
Brockbank retired from medicine in 1926. He died on 2 January 1959.

== Selected publications ==
- The Murmurs of Mitral Disease ISBN 978-1334696565
- Sketches of the Lives and Work of the Honorary Medical Staff of the Manchester Infirmary: From Its Foundation in 1752 to 1830, When It Became the Royal Infirmary ISBN 978-0266410690
- Dreschfeld Memorial Volume, Containing an Account of the Life, Work, and Writings of the Late Julius Dreschfeld: With a Series of Original Articles ... and Former Pupils ISBN 978-1528087858
- Life Insurance and General Practice ISBN 978-0530750286
- The Manchester Medical Society and the Literary and Philosophical Society of Manchester ISBN 978-0332965703
- A Short History of Cheadle Royal, from its foundation in 1766 for the humane treatment of mental disease
- John Dalton. Experimental Physiologist And Would-Be Physician. ASIN B0027PCFE0
- The Foundation Of Provincial Medical Education In England (And Of The Manchester School In Particular) ASIN B000WHVNGQ
- The Conduct of Life Assurance Examinations ASIN B000L6CG96
- A Centenary History of the Manchester Medical Society
- On Gall-Stones or Cholelithiasis ISBN 978-1135528843
- The Diagnosis and Treatment of Heart Disease: Practical Points for Students and Practitioners ISBN 978-1165665853
- John Ferriar: public health work, Tristram Shandy, other essay and verses. William Osler: his interest in Ferriar, biographical notes. (1950)
- Heart Sounds and Murmurs, their Causation and Recognition. A handbook for students
- The Clinical Examination of Diseases of the Lungs
- Children - Their Care and Management
