= Ernest William Morris =

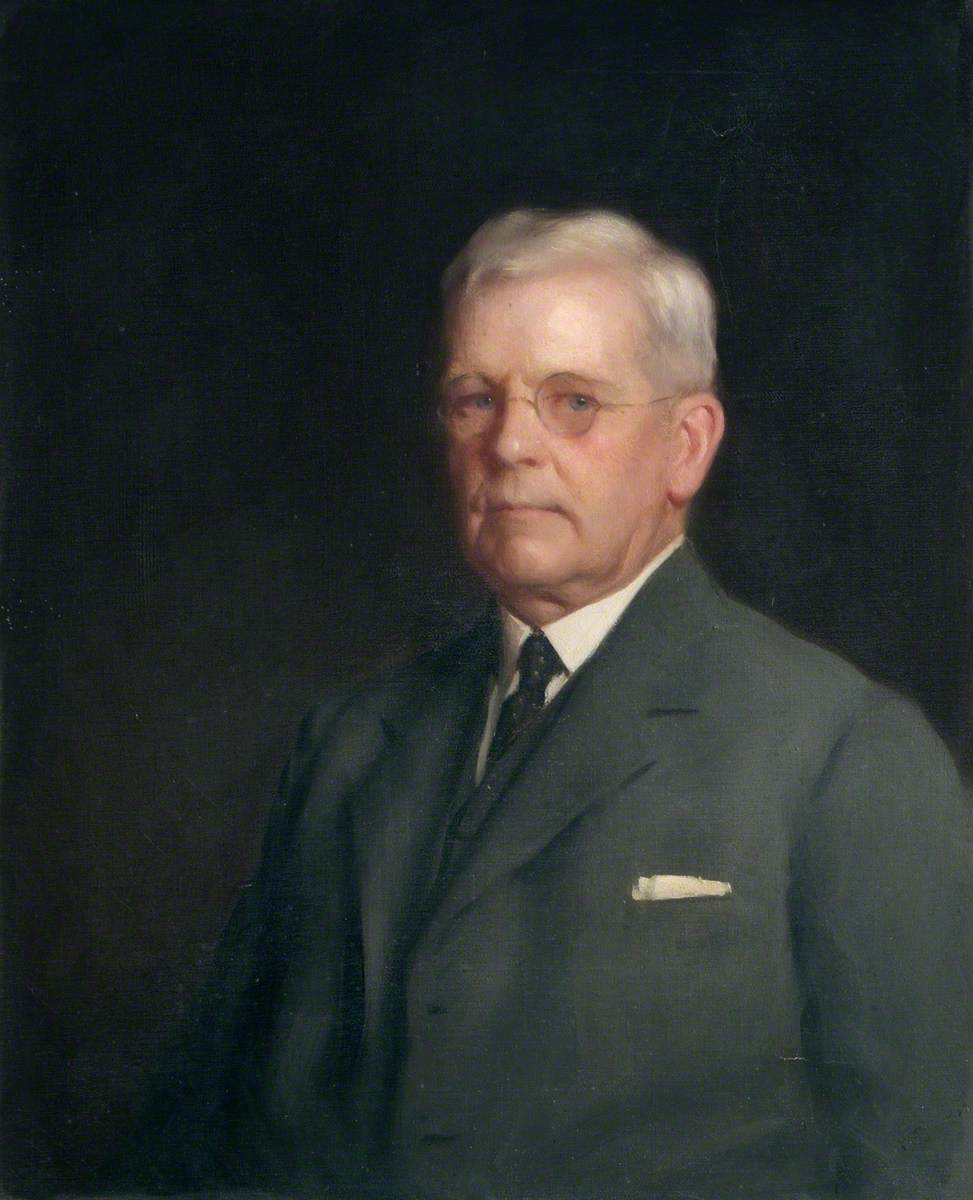
Sir Ernest Morris, anonymous, c. 1931. Oil on canvas, Royal London Hospital Museum & Archives.

Sir Ernest William Morris CBE (1866 – 25 May 1937) was an English chemist who served as secretary and house governor of The London Hospital (1903–1930).

He was born in Madras, India, the son of Rev. William Edward Morris of Market Harborough and his wife, Mary.

== Selected publications ==
- A History of the London Hospital. Edward Arnold, London, 1910.
