= John Sims (taxonomist) =

English physician and botanist (1749–1831)

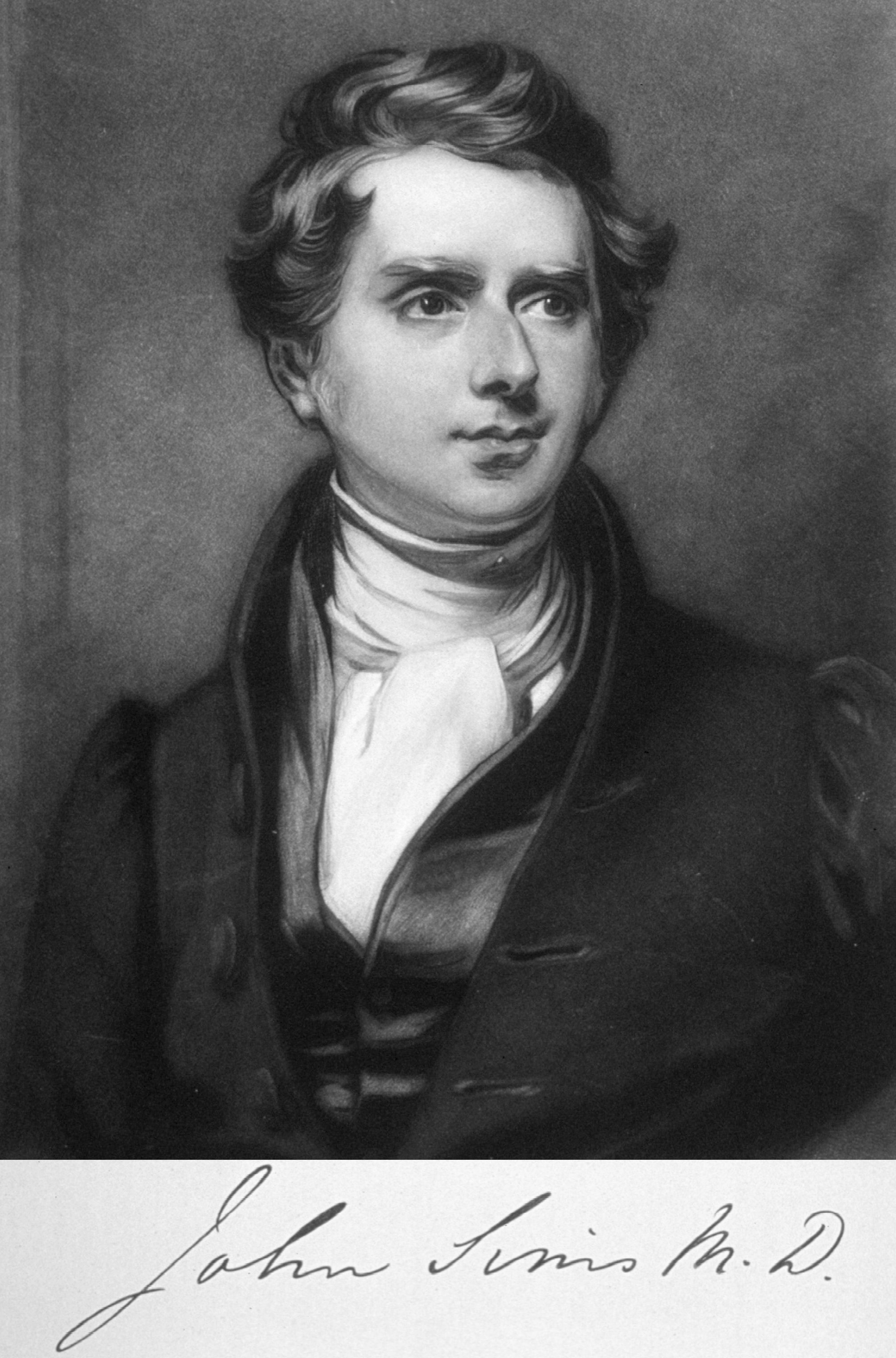
John Sims by Charles Robert Leslie

John Sims (13 October 1749 – 26 February 1831) was an English medical doctor and botanist. He was born in Canterbury, Kent and was subsequently educated at the Quaker school in Burford, Oxfordshire, he then went on to study medicine at Edinburgh University. Later in life he moved to London (1766) where he worked as a physician. Notably, he was called in to assist with Princess Charlotte's labour, but mother and baby both died. He was the first editor of Curtis's Botanical Magazine.

== Early life ==
Sims was born in Canterbury, Kent, the son of Robert Courthope Sims (1720–1812), a physician, and Rebecca née Tritton (1723–c1781). His father was a member of the Society of Friends who published An Essay on the Nature and Constitution of Man .

He was educated at the Quaker school in Burford, Oxfordshire, with additional instruction from his father. He studied medicine at Edinburgh University, obtaining his PhD in 1774. His dissertation was "De usu aquæ frigidæ interno."

== Career ==
=== Medicine ===
He moved to London in 1766, where he worked as a physician at the Surrey Dispensary. He bought an obstetric practice in 1779, and was he was admitted to the Royal College of Physicians. In 1780 he was appointed Physician and Man Midwife to the Charity for Delivering Poor Married Women at their own Houses. In 1817 he was called to assist with the ill-fated labour of Princess Charlotte, but she and the baby both died.

=== Botany ===
He was the first editor of Curtis's Botanical Magazine (1801–1826 vols. xiv–xlii) after the death of the founder, William Curtis, and edited Annals of Botany (1805–06) with Charles Konig. He was a founding member of the Linnean Society. In March 1814 he was elected a Fellow of the Royal Society.

His papers on botany include a description of the effect of moisture on Mesembryanthemum to the Medical and Physical Journal (vol. ii. 1799), and a "Description of Amomum exscapum" to the Annals of Botany (vol. i.).

The genus name Simsia was published by the German Christiaan Hendrik Persoon in 1807, to honour Sims' work. His herbarium was purchased by George Bentham and passed to the Royal Botanic Gardens, Kew.

== Death ==
In 1825 he resigned from his medical practice and retired to Dorking, Surrey where he died in 1831. He is buried in Fittleworth, Sussex with his wife Ann née Christie (1765–1835) and their only son, the Rev Dr Courthope Sims MD MB (1795–1833).
