= Royal Chest Hospital =

Hospital in City Road

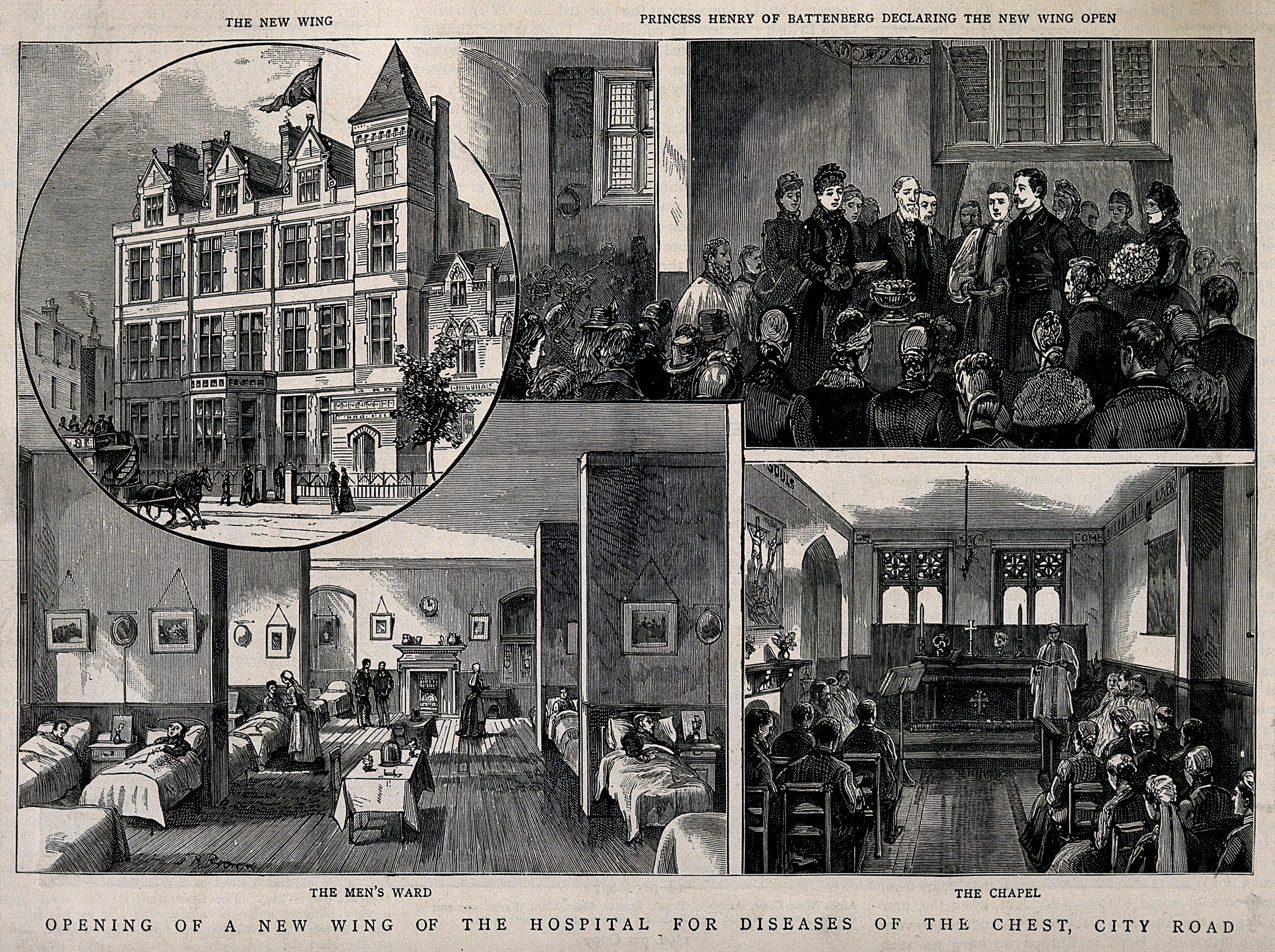

Geography
- Location: City Road, London, England
- Coordinates: 51.529°N 0.093°W

Organisation
- Type: Specialist

Services
- Speciality: Diseases of the chest

History
- Opened: 1814
- Closed: 1954

Links
- Lists: Hospitals in England

The Royal Chest Hospital was a hospital in City Road, London. It operated from 1814 until 1954.

== History ==
The hospital was founded by Isaac Buxton in 1814 as the Infirmary for Asthma, Consumption and other Pulmonary Diseases. At first it had only eight beds and Buxton was its only physician for the first six years of its existence. It was located in Union Street, Spitalfields, before moving to City Road in 1849. It became the Royal Infirmary for Diseases of the Chest in 1859 shortly before the structure was rebuilt in 1862. It became the Royal Hospital for Diseases of the Chest in 1867 and the Royal Chest Hospital in 1919. It amalgamated with the Royal Northern Hospital and, following damage from bombing sustained during the Second World War, it joined the National Health Service in 1948. It closed in 1954 and the building has since been demolished.

== See also ==
- Thoresby House, the last remaining building of the Royal Chest Hospital
