= Whitefriars, London =

Area in London, England

Whitefriars is an area in the Ward of Farringdon Without in the City of London. Until 1540, it was the site of a Carmelite monastery, from which it gets its name.

== History ==
The coat of arms of the Carmelite order.

The area takes its name from the medieval Carmelite religious house, known as the White Friars, that lay here between about 1247 and 1538. Only a crypt remains today of what was once a late 14th century priory belonging to a Carmelite order popularly known as the White Friars because of the white mantles they wore on formal occasions. During its heyday, the priory sprawled the area from Fleet Street to the Thames. At its western end was the Temple and to its east was Water Lane (now called Whitefriars Street). A church, cloisters, garden and cemetery were housed in the ground.

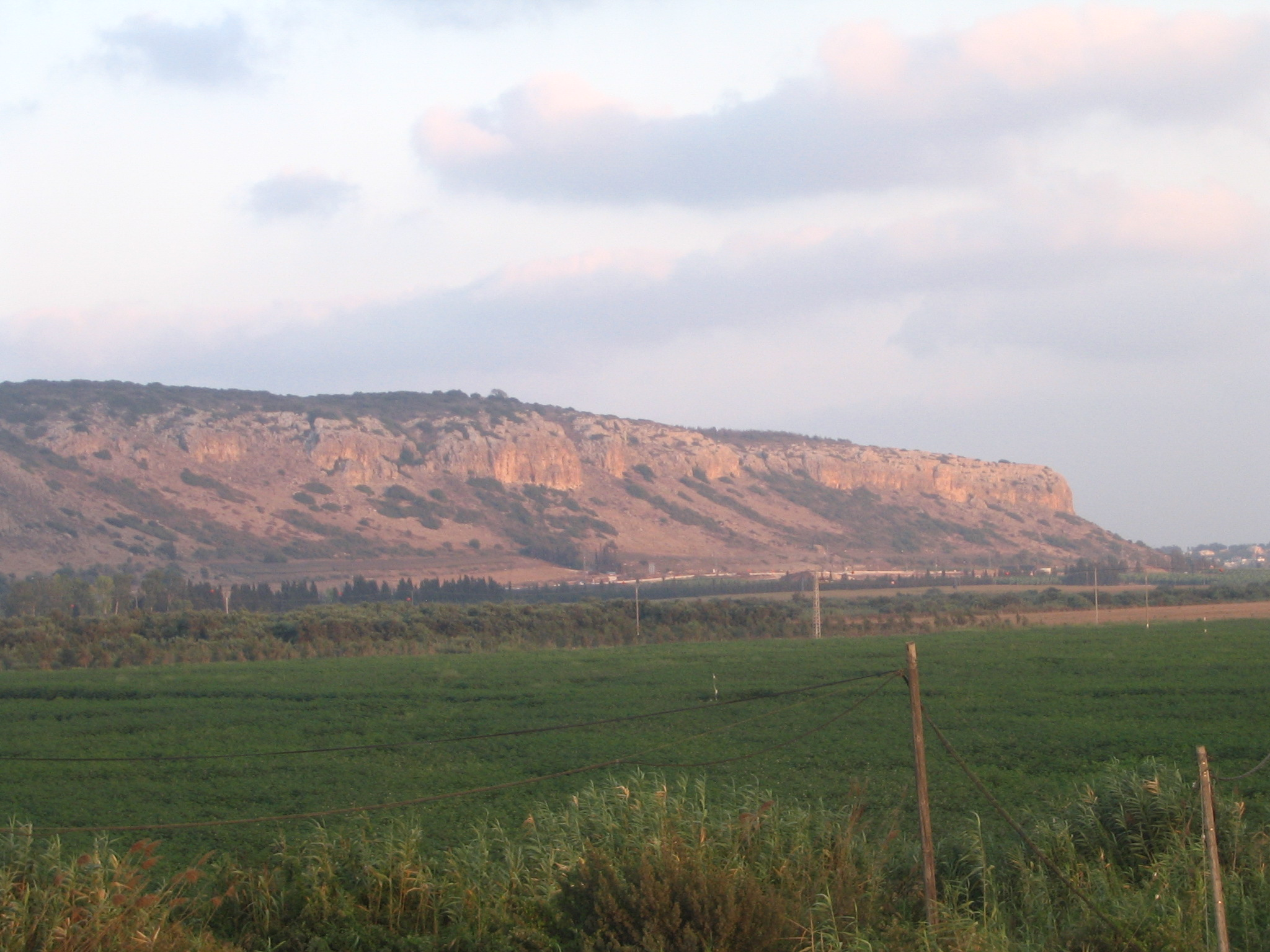
Mount Carmel in northern Israel.

The roots of the Carmelite order go back to its founding on Mount Carmel, which was situated in what is today Israel, in 1150. The order had to flee Mount Carmel to escape the wrath of the Saracens in 1238. Some members of the order found a sympathizer in Richard, Earl of Cornwall, and brother of King Henry III, who helped them travel to England, where they built a church on Fleet Street in 1253. A larger church supplanted this one a hundred years later.

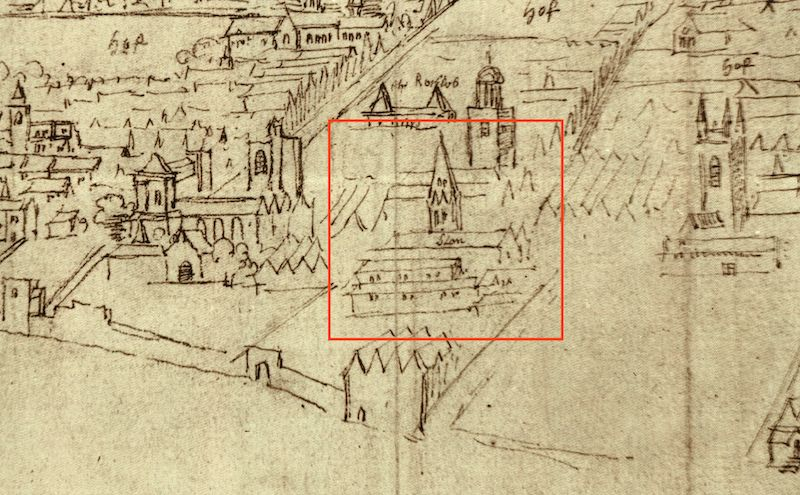
Whitefriars on the Wyngaerde panorama

=== The Whitefriars crypt ===
A vaulted cellar of the medieval friary survives under the modern 65 Fleet Street building. The 14th-century cellar was probably part of the White Friars prior's mansion. The medieval remains were lifted up on a crane during the construction of the modern building in 1991 and then replaced (in a slightly altered location); the cellar or 'crypt' can be viewed from Magpie Alley to the south of Fleet Street.

=== Burials ===
- John de Mowbray, 1st Earl of Nottingham
- Robert Knolles
- Robert Mascall
- Richard Empson
- Sir Henry Bromflete, Baron Vessy
- Sir Matthew Gough
- Alice Ferriby, first wife of Humphrey Coningsby (judge)

=== Dark side ===
Whitefriars was known as a red-light district in early modern England; and (under the name of Alsatia) as a haunt of criminals, being a place of sanctuary until 1697.

=== Alsatia ===
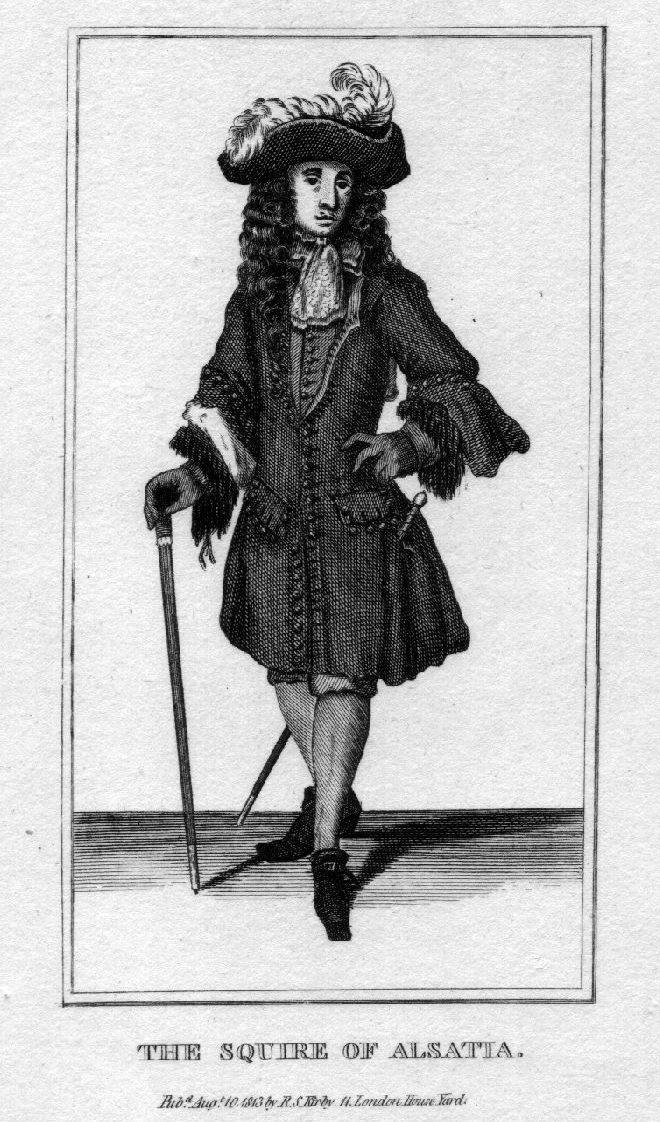
"The Squire of Alsatia", a dandy and rogue of restoration London, from Marcellus Laroon's series The Cryes of London

Alsatia was the name given to an area within Whitefriars that was once privileged as a sanctuary. It spanned from the Whitefriars monastery to the south of the west end of Fleet Street and adjacent to the Temple. Between the fifteenth and seventeenth centuries it was proofed against all but a writ of the Lord Chief Justice or of the Lords of the Privy Council, becoming a refuge for perpetrators of every grade of crime.

It was named after the ancient name for Alsace, a region outside legislative and juridical lines, and first appeared in print in a 1688 play by Thomas Shadwell, The Squire of Alsatia. To this day it remains used as a term depicting an area beyond the law.

The execution of a warrant in Alsatia, if at any time practicable, was attended with great danger, as all united in a maintenance in common of the immunity of the place. It was one of the last places of sanctuary used in England, abolished by the Escape of Debtors, etc. Act 1696 (8 & 9 Will. 3. c. 27). Aside from Whitefriars, eleven other places in London were named in the act: The Minories, The Mint, Salisbury Court, Fulwoods Rents, Mitre Court, Baldwins Gardens, The Savoy, The Clink, Deadmans Place, Montague Close, and Ram Alley. Further acts in the 1720s abolished sanctuary in The Mint and Stepney.

In the reign of Edward I., a certain Sir Robert Gray, moved by qualms of conscience or honest impulse, founded on the bank of the Thames, east of the well-guarded Temple, a Carmelite convent, with broad gardens, where the white friars might stroll, and with shady nooks where they might con their missals. Bouverie Street and Ram Alley were then part of their domain, and there they watched the river and prayed for their patrons' souls. In 1350 Courtenay, Earl of Devon, rebuilt the Whitefriars Church, and in 1420 a Bishop of Hereford added a steeple. In time, greedy hands were laid roughly on cope and chalice, and Henry VIII., seizing on the friars' domains, gave his physician—that Doctor Butts mentioned by Shakespeare—the chapter-house for a residence. Edward VI.—who, with all his promise, was as ready for such pillage as his tyrannical father—pulled down the church, and built noblemen's houses in its stead. The refectory of the convent, being preserved, afterwards became the Whitefriars Theatre. The mischievous right of sanctuary was preserved to the district, and confirmed by James I., in whose reign the slum became jocosely known as Alsatia— from Alsace, that unhappy frontier then, and later, contended for by French and Germans—just as Chandos Street and that shy neighbourhood at the north-west side of the Strand used to be called the Caribbee Islands, from its countless straits and intricate thieves' passages. The outskirts of the Carmelite monastery had no doubt become disreputable at an early time, for even in Edward III.'s reign the holy friars had complained of the gross temptations of Lombard Street (an alley near Bouverie Street). Sirens and Dulcineas of all descriptions were ever apt to gather round monasteries. Whitefriars, however, even as late as Cromwell's reign, preserved a certain respectability; for here, with his supposed wife, the Dowager Countess of Kent, Selden lived and studied.

— According to Walter Thornbury, in his 1878 book Old and New London
