= Guildable Manor =

Court Leet in Southwark

Guildable Manor of Southwark
- Motto: Floreat Villa et Burgus de Southwarke
- Location: Colechurch House, London Bridge Walk, Southwark, London SE1 2SX
- Date of formation: ca 880 AD
- Company association: Courts Leet and Southwark Borough
- Master of company: 'Foreman' from 19 November 2025: Julie Fox
- Website: http://www.guildablemanor.org

Guildable Manor is a Court Leet in Southwark under the authority of the City of London, along with the King's Manor, Southwark, and the Great Liberty.

The name of 'Guildable', first recorded in 1377, refers to the collection of taxes there and was adopted to distinguish this from the other manors of the Southwark area. Its legal title, according to a royal charter granted to the city by King Edward III in 1327, is 'the ville of Southwark' ('ville' meaning 'town'); in the more substantive charter of Edward VI it is designated 'The Town and Borough of Southwark' as is stated on its seal. It is a preserved limited jurisdiction under the Administration of Justice Act 1977. Although neither a guild nor a livery company, the Guildable Manor does have a permanent organization, consisting of officers and jurors.

The Court of Aldermen of the City appoints a High Steward. Since 1900 this has been the Recorder of London, sitting at the Old Bailey. The Aldermen also appoint a High Bailiff; since 1750 this had been the current Under Sheriff and Secondary of London, but since 2017 this is the senior administrator of the Old Bailey. Once a year, usually on the second Wednesday in November, these two officials swear into office the Jurors and their nominated officers.

The area of the manor includes the south-side footing of London Bridge, Southwark Cathedral, Borough Market, Hays Galleria and The Shard. In 2012 a small connecting street was named 'Guildable Manor Street' to commemorate the institution, and was formally opened in 2018.

== Procedure and court leet ==
A summons from the 'Old Bailey':

"Juror of the Town and Borough of Southwark 'Guildable Manor': You are hereby summoned to appear personally before the High Steward of the said Manor, at a Court Leet and View of Frankpledge with the Court Baron of the Mayor and Commonality and Citizens of the City of London to be held at [a venue and date/time] then and there to serve as a Juror of the said Court. Hereof you are not to fail on pain of amerciament. High Bailiff ".

On the appointed day, the court is assembled, the jurors are sworn in and they name their Foreman and he names a Constable, an Affeeror, a Flesh Taster and Ale Conners, who take their oaths. The Affeeror, 'a-fee-rs', i.e. prices the fines; the Ale Conners and the Flesh Taster are appointed to test the quality and measure of beers and meats, i.e. check weights and measures. The terminology is similar to the practice of livery companies: foreman = master; sworn officers = wardens; tithing = court of assistants; tithingmen = assistants who have served as foreman.

The High Bailiff then reads the Riot Act (section 7 of the act required, before it was repealed, that the full act be read out at courts leet) and the High Steward then delivers his 'charge' to the Jury. After this the Foreman states any 'presentments', i.e. the cases he wishes to present. There have been none since the early Victorian period.

The High Steward, being such an eminent jurist, then gives a talk (a 'charge' to the jury) on some historical matter or an issue of some current legal concern and controversy, and the court then adjourns to allow the jurors to continue in a convivial way, entertaining their guests and the Old Bailey officers to a festive meal.

This arrangement of the city's law officers swearing the jurors ('freemen') and foreman with officers/tithing ('master and wardens') is unique in the city, unlike the liveries and guilds which swear their own freemen and courts of assistants. The city's authority in Southwark in relation to its manors there dates from 1327, considerably pre-dating most of the livery companies' foundations. However, it is the manor's officers who conduct all ceremonial in the borough and not (as in the city) the Guildhall officials.

== History ==
The members of the 'Guildable Manor' are the free tenants or burgesses of the 'Town and Borough of Southwark' which is the title given to it in the charter granted to the city by Edward VI in 1550. The original burh of Southwark (ſuðringa geƿeorce) was founded by Alfred the Great ca 879–886 as part of a system of 33 forts to defend the kingdom of Wessex and English Mercia from the Vikings (see Burghal Hidage). These forts had become by the late tenth century settlements and towns in which there where markets, tradesmen/ craftsmen and a mint. The denizens had certain rights within the feudal system which meant they were 'free' of manorial obligations, indeed they began to exercise within their settlements what were effectively manorial rights of a 'lord'. Apart from trade and administrative control the 'freemen' or burgesses (burh members) also dispensed local justice and this too grew from an early Anglo-Saxon procedure of the frið-borh. This was the ‘peace-oath’, which required all freemen to pledge by oath to uphold the peace of the realm. They did this by binding each other in mutual cogniscence, usually in an assembly of a tenth part, a ‘tything’, of a ‘hundred’ (a subdivision of a shire with a taxable value of a hundred hides). This procedure is prefigured in King Alfred's law codes by an arrangement called the gegilden and references to tenth century ‘frith gilds’.

The clearest proof of the ancient status of the Southwark free-tenants is their first written appearance; this is in Domesday Book compiled in 1086 for William the Conqueror. This was a national record of account to list what was owed to the king by his tenants in chief, his fellow Norman conquerors and the senior Prelates of the Church, whom were the greatest landholders. These in turn had sub-let to others, so that ownership and duties, either food-rents or military services, had become confused as to who owed them, the tenant in chief or the under-tenant. The king therefore sent his commissioners across the nation to interrogate these to provide evidences, they also asked the king's local agent in the shires or counties to confirm these statements, the 'shire-reeves'. These sheriffs could not know everything, but they could ask the local freemen on oath to announce their opinion of this information. The point is that the freemen could express the truth in the knowledge of royal protection from the wrath of local magnates. In the sections of Domesday Book in regard to this manor, the 'Men of Southwark' are shown as doing this.

In 1326 the city was allied to the cause of Queen Isabella and Mortimer to remove Edward II and replace him with his juvenile son as Edward III. In doing so the city was rewarded with the maintenance and extension of its privileges at the first Parliament of the new reign in March 1327 and granted associated charters to authorise some major livery companies and to grant the Crown's interest in Southwark to the city for the fee or tax farm, the City thereafter appointing the Bailiff who was now responsible to the city as 'Lord of the manor'. The charter of 1327 is still extant and held at Guildhall.

== Quit rents and Court of Exchequer ==
The charter granted to the City of London by Edward III to take control of the ancient borough and manor ('ville of Southwark' alias Guildable Manor) was specific in that an annual render of cash had to be made to the Crown's treasury, the Exchequer. In Domesday Book the value of Southwark to the king was noted as £16.00, and there is some evidence that the render was for £10 in the early period but it eventually settled at £11; the differences may have been related to fee or tax farming.

Each year, usually near the charter date of 6 March, this Quit Rent is made at a ceremonial Court of Exchequer of the Kings Remembrancer. The Remembrancer instructs the Attorney to the City of London as Clerk of the Court (a post held by an officer of the City Remembrancer's department at Guildhall) to summons the free burgess tenants of the Guildable Manor, in their capacity as the representatives of the city in Southwark, to the court as jurors to make the payment. They then travel to Southwark to institute the court. The jurors attend and stand witness to their foreman and officers, presenting the rental by placing 44 crowns, i.e. five shilling (now 25 pence) pieces onto the Exchequer Cloth to represent the £11. The clerk to the Chamberlain's Court of the city also attends to inform his superior that the rent for Southwark has indeed been paid and the city's obligations to the Crown fulfilled. Although largely now decorative, the ceremony underlies the fact that the City Bridge House Estates (now known as the City Bridge Foundation) is the largest land-owner in the area. The estate pays the annual jurors' fee; the Chamberlain's office pays the actual rent along with many others to the Crown. The event has been held in a number of dignified venues over the years, including the Cathedral Library, Glaziers Hall and Guy's Chapel, but most often in recent years at the church of St George the Martyr, Southwark.
