= Escape of Debtors, etc. Act 1696 =

Act of the Parliament of England

- Act of Parliament
- Parliament of England
- Long title: An Act for the more effectual Relief of Creditors in Cases of Escapes & for Preventing Abuses in Prisons and pretended priveledged Places.
- Citation: 8 & 9 Will. 3. c. 27
- Territorial extent: England and Wales

Dates
- Royal assent: 16 April 1697
- Commencement: 1 May 1697 (Note: Section 1.)
- Repealed: 30 July 1948
Other legislation
Amended by	Statute Law Revision Act 1888
Repealed by	Statute Law Revision Act 1867; Statute Law Revision Act 1887; Public Authorities Protection Act 1893; Statute Law Revision Act 1948
Relates to	Escape of Debtors from Prison Act 1702; The Mint in Southwark Act 1722; Shelterers in Wapping, Stepney, etc. Act 1724

Status: Repealed

Text of statute as originally enacted

The Escape of Debtors, etc. Act 1696 (8 & 9 Will. 3. c. 27), also known as the Escape from Prison Act 1697, was an act of the Parliament of England.

Several locations in London, mainly liberties and extra-parochial areas, had become notorious as hideaways for debtors escaping imprisonment. Those named in the act were Whitefriars, the Savoy, Salisbury Court, Ram Alley, Mitre Court, Fulwood’s Rents [or Fuller's Rents], Baldwins Gardens, "Mountague Close or the Minories", the Mint, and "Clink or Deadmans Place". The privileges and immunities of these places were suspended so that the debtors could be pursued.

== Subsequent developments ==
The Mint was a particularly well-known bolt hole and despite the act, remained so until the reign of George I, when a further act, The Mint in Southwark Act 1722 (9 Geo. 1 .c. 28) was passed. Two years later a similar act, the Shelterers in Wapping, Stepney, etc. Act 1724 (11 Geo. 1. c. 22) applied to "the hamlet of Wapping-Stepney".

Those two acts, as well as sections 1, 3, 5, 10–15 and 18 to the end of the act were repealed by section 1 of, and the schedule to, the Statute Law Revision Act 1871 (34 & 35 Vict. c. 116), which came into force on 21 August 1871.

Section 2 and section 17 from beginning to "provided nevertheless." of the act were repealed by section 1 of, and the schedule to, the Statute Law Revision Act 1887 (50 & 51 Vict. c. 59), which came into force on 16 September 1887.

Section 17 of the act was repealed by section 2 of, and the schedule to, the Public Authorities Protection Act 1893 (56 & 57 Vict. c. 61), which came into force on 1 January 1894.

The whole act, so far as unrepealed, was repealed by section 1 of, and the first schedule to, the Statute Law Revision Act 1948 (11 & 12 Geo. 6. c. 62), which came into force on 30 July 1948.

== Bibliography ==
- "'William III, 1696-7: An Act for the more effectual Relief of Creditors in Cases of Escapes & for Preventing Abuses in Prisons and pretended privileged Places. [Chapter XXVII. Rot. Parl. 8&9 Gul. III. p.9.nu.3.]". Statutes of the Realm. Vol. 7: 1695-1701. pp. 271–275.
- "Ch. 17: From the Revolution to the death of William III". A New History of London: Including Westminster and Southwark. Vol. Book 1. pp. 272–88.
- Ruffhead, Owen (1786). The Statutes at Large. Vol. 5. Eyre & Strahan.
