= Liberty of the Mint =

Area where coins were produced in London, England

Coordinates: 51.502°N 0.096°W

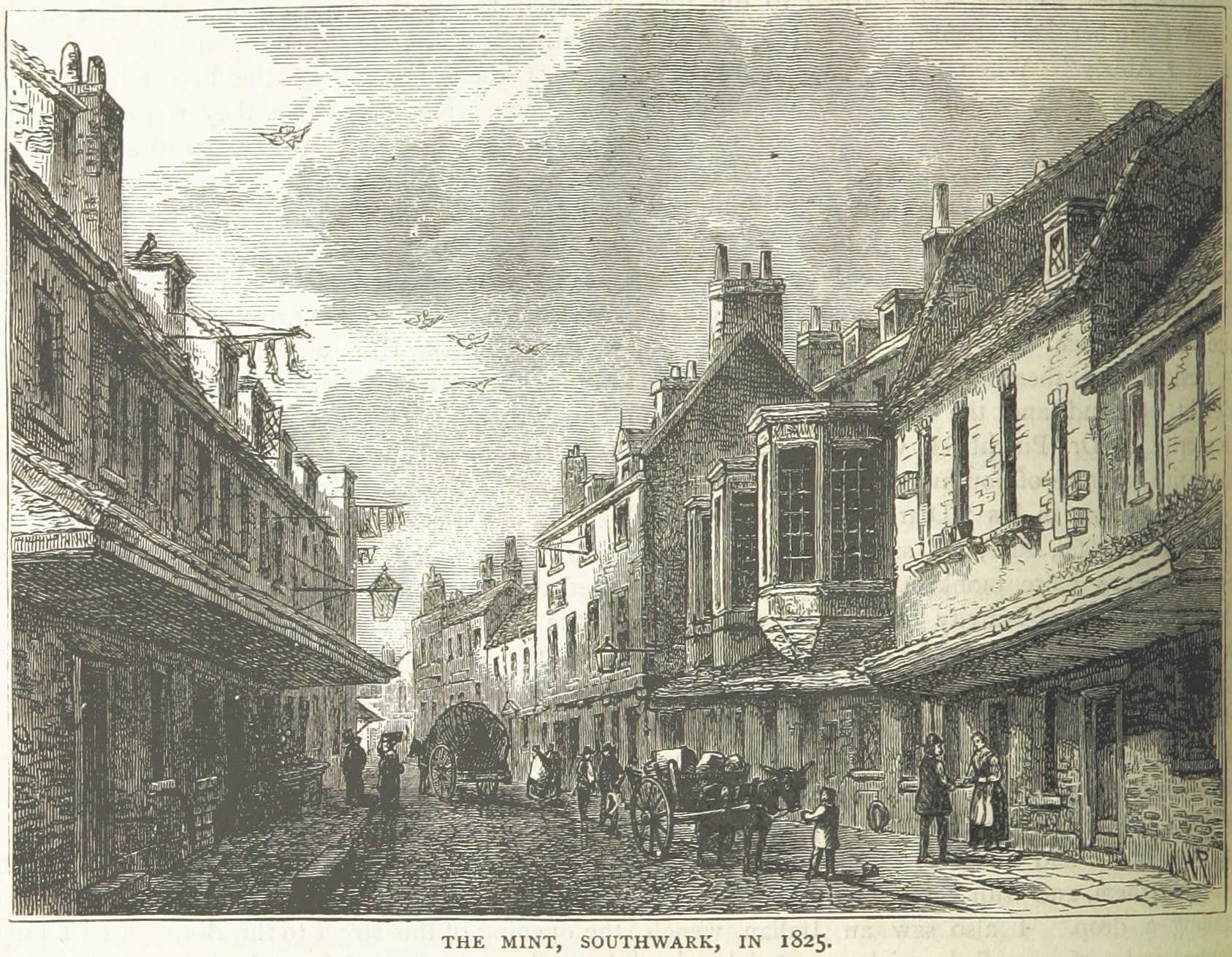
The Mint, Southwark, in 1825

The Mint was a district in Southwark, south London, England, on the west side of Borough High Street, around where Marshalsea Road is now located. It was so named because a mint authorised by King Henry VIII was set up in Suffolk Place, a mansion house, in about 1543. The mint ceased to operate in the reign of Mary I and Suffolk Place was demolished in 1557. In the late-17th and early-18th centuries, the area was known for offering protection against prosecution for debtors due to its legal status as a "liberty", or a jurisdictional interzone.

== History ==
In 1550, the City of London acquired two manors from Edward VI's government. They comprised the former holding of Bermondsey Abbey on the west side of Borough High Street (see also King's Manor, Southwark) and that of the Archbishop of Canterbury on the east side . The charter retained the mansion and grounds of the Duke of Suffolk, known as Suffolk Place and Southwark Place that had been assigned to Edward's mother by Henry VIII. On the accession of Mary I she assigned it to the Archbishop of York for his London palace, and that diocese began to lease the estate for development, mainly of the highest density and poorest quality; the area became a rookery of slums. The 1550 charter's exemption from the city's control of the neighbouring manor created a separate jurisdiction, the Liberty of the Mint. "The Mint" therefore, became an Alsatia (so called after the area of Whitefriars), a haunt of criminals and fugitives.

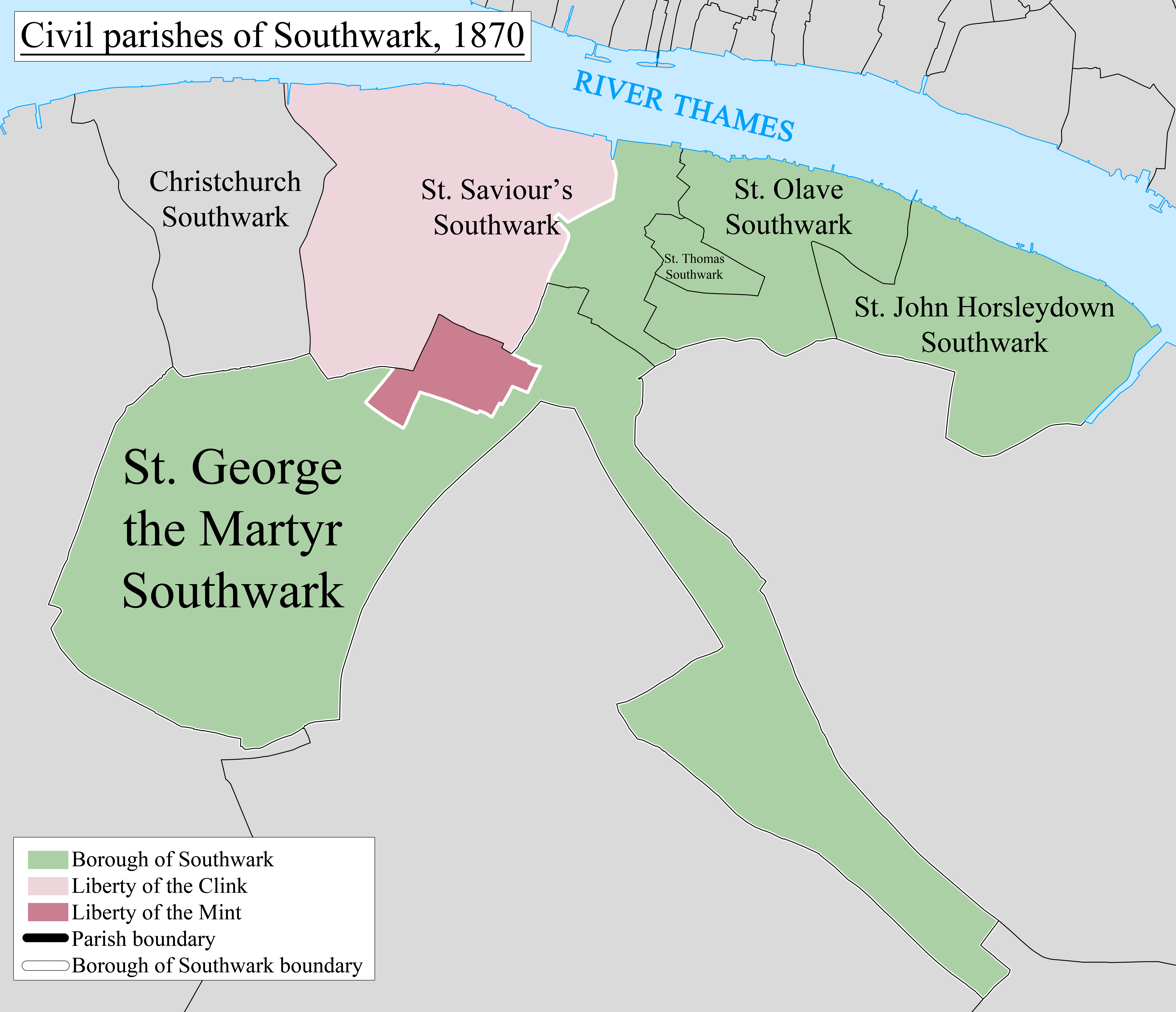
A map showing the Liberty of the Mint within Southwark.

Such anomalous districts attracted particular denizens, and the Mint's primary population was debtors. Those in danger of being thrown into debtors' prison could hide in the Mint. Once there, debtors risked arrest if they were found outside of its boundary. Debt collectors (known as "duns") stood along the main roads out of the Mint to wait for suspected debtors. Sometimes they were bill collectors in the modern sense, and sometimes thugs who beat and seized the debtor. Inside the Mint, life was hard. Since debtors could not leave (except on Sunday, when no debts could be collected), they could not find employment to raise money to pay off their debts. Those who attempted to leave on Sundays to get money from friends or lenders were called "Sunday gentlemen", as they attempted to appear prosperous to hoodwink lenders.

Debtors who went to the Mint frequently died of malnutrition or were murdered before raising enough money to escape. The Mint's geography was a factor in its poor living standard, as it was below the river's level and was a breeding ground for sewage- and water-borne maladies. Daniel Defoe describes life there for his heroine Moll Flanders in the novel of the same name.

In 1723, the Mint lost its protected status as a result of The Mint in Southwark Act 1722 and at the same time, imprisonment for debts of less than £50 was abolished, and many residents left without fear of arrest. The area was a slum into the 19th century. By that time, its reputation as a haunt for the poorest of the poor ensured that it had a lower standard of living than the rest of London. Elsewhere in 19th century London new roads were laid through slum areas to eliminate them, but Southwark Bridge Road, constructed in 1819 to Southwark Bridge, swerved around the western side of the Mint.

In the later 19th century its reputation as one of London's worst rookeries was sustained when conditions there were exposed by the Rev Andrew Mearns in The Bitter Cry of Outcast London (1883) and by George R. Sims in How the Poor Live (1883). The scandal created by Mearns' and Sims' revelations prompted a Royal Commission in 1884–1885 but the destruction of the Mint was underway. From 1881 to 1886, associated with the construction of Marshalsea Road, the area was cleared of most of its slums, although even in 1899 some remnants of the rookery were still in place between Red Cross Street and Borough High Street.

The Mint is referred to by most 18th-century British satirists, including Alexander Pope in his Epistle to Dr Arbuthnot and, indirectly, by John Gay in Trivia. It is the refuge of the outlaw Jack Sheppard in William Harrison Ainsworth's novel Jack Sheppard (1839) and in the novel The System of the World by Neal Stephenson.

The only remnant of the Mint is a street in the location named Mint Street.

== See also ==
- The Marshalsea, a debtors' prison close to the Mint to the east.
