= Cert-money =

Cert-money, or head-money, was a common fine, paid annually by the residents of several manors to the lords thereof; and sometimes to the hundred; pro certo letae, for the certain keeping of the leet. This in ancient records, was called certum letae.
