= Spaunton =

Hamlet and civil parish in North Yorkshire, England

Coordinates: 54.299795°N 0.890640°W

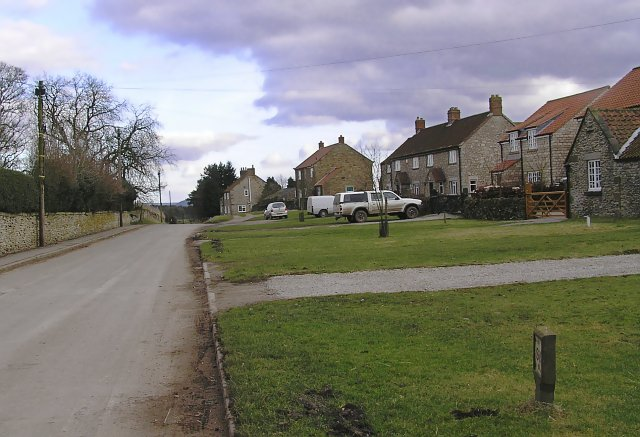
- Spaunton village

- Location within North Yorkshire
- OS grid reference: SE722899
- Civil parish: Spaunton
- Unitary authority: North Yorkshire
- Ceremonial county: North Yorkshire
- Region: Yorkshire and the Humber
- Country: England
- Sovereign state: United Kingdom
- Post town: YORK
- Postcode district: YO62
- Police: North Yorkshire
- Fire: North Yorkshire
- Ambulance: Yorkshire
- UK Parliament: Thirsk and Malton

Spaunton is a hamlet and civil parish in North Yorkshire, England. At the 2011 the civil parish had a population of less than 100. Details are included in the civil parish of Lastingham. It is situated near Lastingham and about 5 miles (8 km) north west of Pickering. The name Spaunton derives from Old Norse and means a farmstead or settlement which had shingle roofs.

From 1974 to 2023 it was part of the district of Ryedale, it is now administered by the unitary North Yorkshire Council.

Spaunton is still the setting for a Court Leet. Every year in October, the court convenes to hear cases involving encroachment on village common land and to impose penalties on violators. The full title of the court is the Manor of Spaunton Court Leet and Court Baron with View of Frankpledge.

Just after 9:00 pm on the 7 October 1943, a Lancaster bomber of No. 408 Squadron RCAF from RAF Linton-on-Ouse crashed into the village with a full load of ordnance. One of the bombs exploded and killed a civilian from the village, George Strickland, as he went to see what the noise was about. He is buried in Lastingham graveyard.

== See also ==
- Listed buildings in Spaunton
