= Listed buildings in Spaunton =

Spaunton is a civil parish in the county of North Yorkshire, England. It contains five listed buildings that are recorded in the National Heritage List for England. All the listed buildings are designated at Grade II, the lowest of the three grades, which is applied to "buildings of national importance and special interest". The parish contains the hamlet of Spaunton and the surrounding countryside. The listed buildings consist of a house, an animal pound, a farmhouse, a commemorative cross, and a set of limekilns.

== Buildings ==
| Name and location | Photograph | Date | Notes |
|---|---|---|---|
| Woodman's Cottage; 54.29971°N 0.88883°W | — | 1695 or earlier | The house is in limestone, with quoins and a slate roof. There is one storey and attics, and three bays. The doorway has a quoined moulded surround, a Tudor arched head, and a dated lintel. The windows are casements, and in the attics are three gabled half-dormers with casements. |
| Pound; 54.29934°N 0.89014°W | | 18th century (probable) | The animal pound is in gritstone and it has a square plan. The walls are between 1.2 metres (3 ft 11 in) and 1.5 metres (4 ft 11 in) in height with diagonally-laid coping stones, and in the southeast corner is a gateway. |
| Hill Top Farmhouse; 54.30015°N 0.89162°W | — | c. 1760 | The farmhouse is in sandstone, with quoins, and a pantile roof with coped gables and shaped kneelers. There are two storeys and four bays. On the front is a doorway, a French window to the right, and a fire window between them. The ground floor windows are casements, and on the upper floor are horizontally sliding sashes. Inside, there is an inglenook fireplace. |
| Victoria Cross; 54.30137°N 0.88254°W | | 1837 | The cross replaced a medieval high cross on the site. The base is dated 1837, and the cross 1897, commemorating the Diamond Jubilee of Queen Victoria. It is in gritstone, it has a hexagonal base on two hexagonal steps, and is surmounted by a cross about 2.14 metres (7 ft 0 in) in height. There are inscriptions and dates on the base. |
| Calcining kilns 54.34436°N 0.89256°W | | c. 1856 | The limekilns are faced in rusticated stone, and lined with red and cream brick. They consist of a bank of four kilns, with four more added later. The early ones have narrow round-headed arches of rusticated voussoirs on rusticated piers, and the later ones have wider semicircular arches. Behind the earlier kilns is a stone wall with flat coping. |
