= Court leet =

Historical court baron in England, Wales and Ireland

The court leet (Latin: curia leta, curia magna, curia cum visu franciplegii, lit. 'court leet, great court, court within sight of frankpledge') was a historical court baron (a type of manorial court) of England and Wales and Ireland that exercised the "view of frankpledge" and its attendant police jurisdiction, which was normally restricted to the hundred courts.

== Etymology ==
The word "leet", as used in reference to special court proceedings, dates from the late 13th century, from Anglo-French lete and Anglo-Latin leta of unknown origin, with a possible connection to the verb "let".

== Early history ==
At a very early time in medieval England, the lord of the manor exercised or claimed certain feudal rights over his serfs and feudal tenants. The exercise of those rights was combined with manorial administrative concerns, in his court baron. However this court had no power to deal with criminal acts.

Criminal jurisdiction was held by the hundred courts; the country was divided into hundreds, and there was a hundred court for each of them. Each hundred comprised 100 hides, with each hide being an area of land of variable size that is enough to support one entire household. A tithing was an area of 10 hides, which therefore originally corresponded to about 10 households. The heads of each household were judicially bound to the others in their tithing by an arrangement called frankpledge, which created collective responsibility for behaviour within their tithing. The hundred court monitored this system, in a process called view of frankpledge, with the tithing reporting any wrongdoing in their area, and handing over the perpetrators among them. If the wrongdoing was minor, it would be dealt with by the hundred court, but serious crimes were passed up to the shire court.

Before feudalism, hundred courts had also dealt with administrative matters within their area, such as bridge repairs, road conditions, and so forth, but the courts baron had largely superseded that in practice, and some manorial lords began claiming authority over criminal matters as well. Eventually, the king formally granted certain trusted lords with the legal authority that had been held by the hundred court over the tithings in the lord's manor, the most important of those being view of frankpledge. The group of tithings that were located within each manor had come to be called a "leet", and hence, in the later Middle Ages these judicial powers came to be called "court leet."

The quo warranto proceedings of Edward I established a sharp distinction between the court baron, exercising strictly manorial rights, and the court leet, exercising the powers formerly held by the hundred court, emphasising that the ability to hold court leet depended upon a royally granted franchise. However, in many areas it became customary for the court baron and court leet to meet together, as a single operation.

== Role ==
The court leet was a court of record, and its duty was not only to view the pledges, which were the freemen's oaths of peacekeeping and good practice in trade, but also to try with a jury, and punish, crimes committed within the jurisdiction; more serious crimes were committed to the king's justices. Despite the presence of a jury, it was not trial by jury as understood today. The court leet had developed while the jury system was still evolving; the jury indicted wrongdoers, stood witness, and helped decide on punishment.

It also developed as a means of proactively ensuring that standards in such matters as sales of food and drink, and agriculture, were adhered to. The Alcester Court Leet contained the following wording:

To enquire regularly and periodically into the proper condition of watercourses, roads, paths, and ditches; to guard against all manner of encroachments upon the public rights, whether by unlawful enclosure or otherwise; to preserve landmarks, to keep watch and ward in the town, and overlook the common lands, adjust the rights over them, and restraining in any case their excessive exercise, as in the pasturage of cattle; to guard against the adulteration of food, to inspect weights and measures, to look in general to the morals of the people, and to find a remedy for each social ill and inconvenience. To take cognisance of grosser crimes of assault, arson, burglary, larceny, manslaughter, murder, treason, and every felony at common law.

The court generally sat only a few times each year, sometimes just annually. A matter was introduced into the court by means of a "presentment", from a local man or from the jury itself. Penalties were in the form of fines or imprisonment.

== Jury and officers ==
Attendance at the court leet was often compulsory for those under its jurisdiction, with fines being meted out for non-attendance. The ability of the court to levy a fine was always subject to limitations, but the limits were never updated to account for inflation over the centuries; for those courts leet that still exist, the fine has effectively become merely nominal – 2p for example in the case of Laxton.

Courts leet generally had a jury formed from the freehold tenants, as bondsmen could not give an oath (jury means persons having taken an oath). The jury's role was similar to that of the doomsmen of the Anglo-Saxons and included electing the officers (other than the Steward who was appointed by the lord), bringing matters to the attention of the court and deciding on them.

The officers of courts leet could include some or all of the following:

- Steward, a stand-in for the lord of the manor, and hence his chief official. The steward thus acted as chairman of proceedings – in a comparable manner to a modern-day judge in a jury trial
- Bailiff, the servant of the court. He was responsible for ensuring that the decisions of the court were enacted, including being responsible for summoning the jury, and performing any arrests that had been ordered by the court
- Reeve, the bailiff's deputy (originally the servant of the hundred court, from which the court leet had taken its jurisdiction)
- Constable, to ensure order during court sessions
- Bedel, the usher; typically referred to as mace bearer, in modern-day courts leet, since this is largely all he now does
- Chapelayne, who provided prayers for the court
- Crier or bellman, responsible for announcing of the court's decisions to the people of the manor in general
- Affeerers, responsible for assessing amercements (setting the level of fines)
- Specialist professional inspectors, in lieu of portions of the jury's responsibility:
  - Ale taster or ale conner, to ensure the quality of ale, and to check that true measures are used
  - Carniters or "flesh tasters", to ensure the freshness of meat and poultry
  - Bread weighers, responsible for verifying the freshness and weight of bread sold in the manor
  - Searcher and sealer of leather, to ensure the quality of leather goods
  - Surveyor of the highways or overseer of pavements, and brook looker or ditch reeve, to ensure the proper condition of roads and waterways
  - Chimney peeper, to ensure chimneys were swept clean
  - Scavenger, to ensure standards of hygiene within the lanes and privies and to try and prevent the spread of infectious disease
  - Overseer of the poor, to collect and distribute alms
- Specialist enacting staff, in lieu of parts of the bailiff's responsibility
  - The Hayward, responsible for enclosures and fences on common land
  - The Woodward, responsible for patrolling woodlands and stopping poachers from hunting illegally
  - The Pinherd, to impound stray animals in the pinfold

== Later history ==
The introduction of magistrates gradually rebalanced power away from manorial lords. Magistrates were later given authority over view of frankpledge, which effectively negated the remaining significance of the court leet, and they gradually ceased to be held, largely dying out. Following the collapse of the feudal system, and subsequent rise of the Reformation, civil parishes had largely taken over the remaining authority of courts baron, and tithings were seen as a parish sub-division.

Nevertheless, court leets technically survived into the late 20th century, though almost all of the small number which still operated had become merely ceremonial, simply forming a way of promoting or celebrating their local area. Despite this, their legal jurisdiction over crime was only abolished in 1977, by section 23 of the Administration of Justice Act 1977. However, one exception was allowed: the court leet for the manor of Laxton, Nottinghamshire, which had continued to operate judicially; Laxton retains the open-field system of farming, which had been replaced everywhere else by the 18th century (as a result of the process of enclosure), and required the court in order to administer the field system.

Although the Administration of Justice Act 1977 had abolished the legal jurisdiction of the other courts leet, it emphasised that "any such court may continue to sit and transact such other business, if any, as was customary for it". Schedule 4 to the act specified the "business" which was to be considered customary, which included the taking of presentments relating to matters of local concern and – in some cases – the management of common land.

=== Surviving jurisdictions ===
The following courts leet were exempted from abolition by the Administration of Justice Act 1977, and were known to be still functioning in 2010:

- Alcester (Warwickshire) Court Leet, Court Baron and View of Frankpledge
- Ashburton Courts Leet and Baron
- Bideford Manor Court (held by the town council)
- Court Leet and Court Baron of the Ancient Manor of Bowes in County of Durham
- Ancient Court Leet and Court Baron of the Manor of Bromsgrove
- Courts Leet and Baron of Barony of Cemaes in County of Dyfed (Pembrokeshire)
- Manorial Court for Hundred and Borough of Cricklade
- Danby (North Yorkshire) Court Leet and Court Baron
- Manor of Fyling Court Leet in North Yorkshire
- Court Baron for the Manor of Heaton in City of Bradford
- Court Leet and Court Baron of the Manor of Henley-in-Arden, Warwickshire
- Town and Manor of Hungerford and the Manor and Liberty of Sanden Fee Hocktide Court and Court Leet
- Manor of Laxton Court Leet
- Court Leet and Baron of the Manor of Mynachlogddu, Dyfed
- The Norwich Court of Mayoralty (held by the town council to admit freemen)
- Court Leet of the Island and Royal Manor of Portland still continues as of July 2024
- Southampton Court Leet
- Southwark Courts Leet and Views of Frankpledge for the three Manors of the City of London (the Guildable, King's, and Great Liberty).
- Manor of Spaunton Court Leet and Court Baron with View of Frankpledge
- Manor of Stoborough Court Leet as exempted in the Wareham Borough exemption.
- Courts Leet and Baron of Stockbridge, Hampshire
- Court Leet of the Manor and Borough of Wareham
- Warwick Court Leet

In addition, the following courts leet are in operation, having been re-established, or continued, but without statutory authority (not having been preserved by the 1977 act):

- The Court Leet and Baron of Carrick Blacker at Portadown
- Court Leet and Court Baron of the Manor of Hatherleigh
- Holsworthy, Devon
- Laugharne
- Court Leet of Northleach, Gloucestershire
- Taunton Court Leet
- Watchet Court Leet

By contrast, the statutory backing for the following courts leet was preserved by the 1977 act, but it is not clear whether they are still operative:

- The Bucklebury Court Baron
- Clifton Courts Leet and Baron and View of Frankpledge
- Croyland View of Frankpledge, Court Leet and Great Court Baron
- Manor of Dorney with Boveney Court Leet with Court Baron and View of Frankpledge
- Manor Court of Dunstone (otherwise Blackslade)
- The Court Baron of East Horndon
- Courts Leet and Baron of the Manors of Eton-cum-Stockdales in Colenorton
- The City of London Court of Husting
- Manor of Mickley Court Leet and Court Baron
- Spitchwick Courts Leet and Baron
- Manor of Whitby Laithes Court Leet

The following courts leet are also listed here for unclear reasons, despite not having been exempted from abolition by the 1977 act, and despite it not being clear whether they are still operative:

- Altrincham, Cheshire – Trafford Court Leet, Court Baron and View of Frankpledge
- Courts Leet and Baron of the Manor of Rushton (Staffordshire)
- Normanton on Soar Court Leet

== See also ==
- Cert-money
