= Bourne Estate =

Housing estate in Holborn, London

Coordinates: 51°31′15″N 0°6′41″W

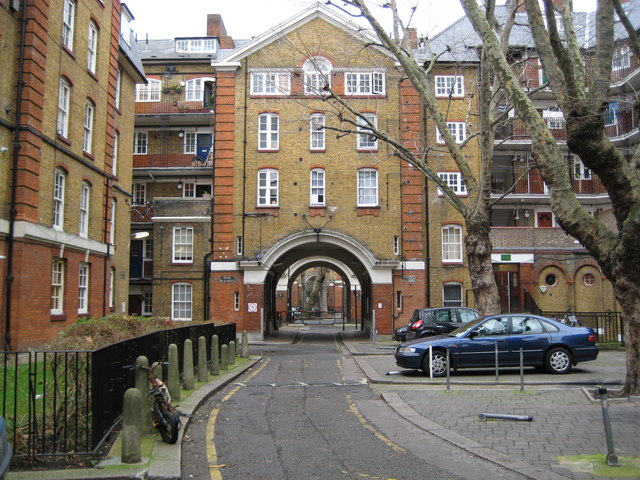
- Interactive map of Bourne Estate

General information
- Location: Hatton Garden
- Area: Holborn

Construction
- Constructed: 1905-09
- Architect: E. H. Parkes
- Authority: London County Council

Refurbishment
- Proposed in: 2013
- Architect: Matthew Lloyd Architects
- Directing authority: London Borough of Camden

Listing
- Listed as: Grade II listed

Other information
- Governing body: Camden Council

The Bourne Estate is an Edwardian housing estate in Holborn, located in the London Borough of Camden. It is bounded by Clerkenwell Road to the north, Gray's Inn Road to the west, Leather Lane to the east and Baldwins Gardens to the south. It is also intersected by Portpool Lane, which forms part of the estate itself.

The estate is built in a free Classical style, with Arts and Crafts touches, developing the idiom established by the London County Council (LCC) with the Boundary Estate and Millbank Estate in a formal direction.

The estate consists of a number of residential blocks which enclose a number of quiet shady courtyards containing mature trees, mostly London planes. The buildings are constructed in dusky red and yellow bricks and the design incorporates classical pediments and stucco pilasters as well as arts and crafts details such as gabled walls, and casement windows on the inner courtyards and decorative mouldings to the large arches on the access ways.

In 2013 planning permission was granted for a £14 million regeneration of the Bourne Estate. Matthew Lloyd Architects’ scheme, developed with Camden Council and Tibbalds Planning and Urban Design, provides 75 new homes across two mixed tenure blocks. Landscaping is to be improved across the southern half of the estate with re-ordered public realm, sports and playspaces by Dally Henderson Landscape Architects.

== History ==
Constructed from 1905–1909, it is regarded as one of London's best examples of tenement housing and the majority of the housing blocks within the Estate have been Grade II listed. The Estate was designed by the LCC Architect's Department, by E. H. Parkes under W. E. Riley.

The Bourne Estate is the third of the three key estates built by the LCC in the years of its greatest innovation. In Britain the Bourne Estate is the least known, but it has an international significance as the model for the much admired and highly influential public housing erected in Vienna immediately after the First World War. The Viennese model was subsequently brought back to England, as can be seen in the Ossulton Estate, Camden, listed some years ago, and in some private mansion blocks in central London of the 1930s.

The surrounding streets were laid out in the 17th century on an intersecting grid pattern from north to south, east to west. Portpool Lane is part of the estate itself and derives its name from the old manor of Portpool which was held by Grays of Wilton, also for Gray's Inn.

The estate was originally bounded at its southern edge by factories and industrial buildings that were damaged during the Second World War and demolished. To the southwest of the estate was Thanksgiving Model Buildings, built in 1850 for the 'Society for Improving the Conditions of the Labouring Classes', this block consisted of two four-storey buildings providing accommodation for 20 families and 128 single women. Also badly bomb-damaged in 1943 during the Blitz, the buildings were subsequently demolished.

Two post-war residential blocks and sports and play facilities were added to this land, with Mawson Building to the South and Gooch Building to the southwest on the former site of Thanksgiving Model Building. A major redevelopment of this part of the estate is planned by Camden Council to take place 2013–16, including the demolition of the unlisted Mawson Building and addition of new blocks in-keeping with the original Edwardian architecture. These new blocks will be mixed private and social housing. Higgins Construction have been appointed to carry out this scheme. The works started in May 2014 and they are scheduled to be completed in August 2016.

A number of the buildings in the Bourne Estate appear to have been named after former Bishops of Ely, perhaps a reference to nearby Ely Place, as follows:

- Shene
- Ledham
- Skipwith
- Denys
- Frewell
- Scrope
- Radcliffe
- Redman
- Nigel
- Laney
- Buckridge
- Kirkby
- Mawson
- Gooch

== Transport ==
The nearest London underground stations are Chancery Lane and Farringdon, with overground trains running from Farringdon.
