= Baldwins Gardens =

Street in London

Coordinates: 51°31′11.88″N 0°6′38.79″W

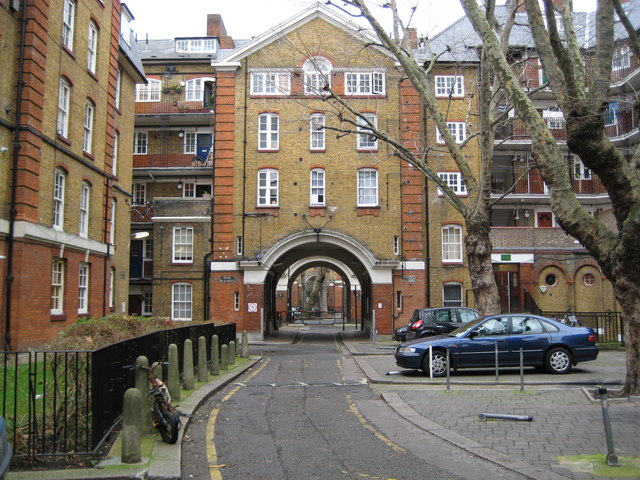
The Bourne Estate

Baldwin Gardens is an east–west road running between Gray's Inn Road and Leather Lane, in Camden, London, England.

The surrounding streets were laid out in the 17th century on an intersecting grid pattern from north to south, east to west. Baldwin Gardens was named after Baldwin, gardener to Queen Elizabeth I. The street is shown on William Morgan's 1682 map of London.

In the 17th century, as Baldwin's Gardens, the street offered sanctuary to debtors seeking to escape their creditors. John Noorthouck in A New History of London including Westminster and Southwark (1773) explained that several London localities had been used since the English Reformation as sanctuaries for debtors and no officers dared "without a hazard of their lives to arrest the lawless debtors who took refuge in them". Baldwin's Gardens and other such areas were known as "pretended privileged places" but lost this status following the passing of the Escape of Debtors, etc. Act 1696.

The Central School of the National Society for Promoting Religious Education, where its teachers were trained, was in Baldwins Gardens from 1812 to 1832.

The Bourne Estate is a group of well-regarded Edwardian tenement blocks on the north side of the road.
