= Leather Lane Market =

Street market in Holborn, London, England

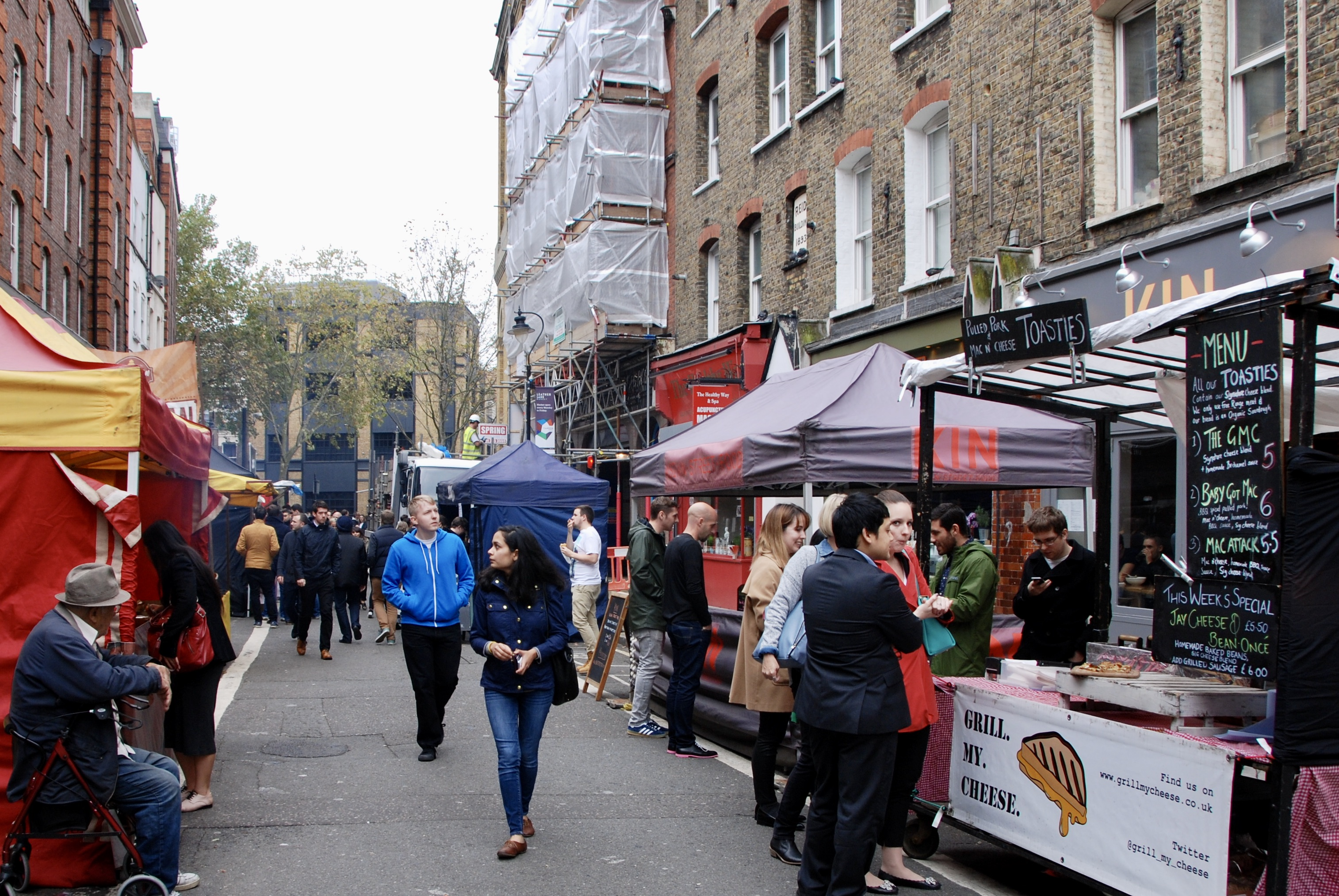
- Leather Lane Market towards Clerkenwell—2014
- Location: Leather Lane Market; Hatton Garden, Camden, Greater London; 51.521217°N 0.109919°W
- Opening date: 1666 (360 years ago)
- Management: Camden London Borough Council
- Owner: Camden London Borough Council
- Environment: Outdoor
- Goods sold: Street food, fruit & veg, household goods, fashion
- Days normally open: Monday to Friday
- Number of tenants: 122
- Website: camden.gov.uk/markets
- Location within London Borough of Camden

Leather Lane Market is an outdoor street market in the Holborn area of the London Borough of Camden. Taking place on Leather Lane, it is the oldest street market in Camden. Licences to trade are issued by Camden London Borough Council.

== History ==
=== Early history (1666–1867) ===
Hatton Garden was being developed into a residential area just prior to the Great Fire of London. The undeveloped areas of Hatton Garden were used as a refuge for Londoners escaping destruction of much of the city. It seems likely that street trading established itself on Leather Lane at this time to cater to the needs of those refugees and to provide employment for the traders who had lost their normal pitches.

Just to the west of Leather Lane, a private open-air butchers market, Brooke's Market was established in at least 1685. In the late eighteenth century many of the lower floors of houses had been converted into shops taverns and coffee shops.

Henry Mayhew records there being 150 stalls in 1851. Most working people were paid each week on Saturday and Saturday night/Sunday morning were the busiest trading time for markets. From his, the earliest examinations of street markets, food that could be consumed on the spot formed an important part of their offer with fried fish, pies, and (from the 1830s) baked potatoes feeding factory and office workers.

==== 1851 closure of the Market ====
Mayhew describes a short-lived attempt by some of the shopkeepers to have the street traders removed that took place shortly before his survey:

“Leather-lane,” I was told, “looked like a desert compared to what it was. People that had lived there for years hardly knew their own street and those that had complained might twiddle their thumbs in their shops for want of something better to do.”

— Henry Mayhew, London Labour and the London Poor

After a fortnight, other traders and the local residents succeeded in having the market traders reinstated. The, brief, closure of Leather Lane inspired a contemporary ballad:

A rummy saintly lot is there,
A domineering crew,
A Butcher, and a Baker,
And an Undertaker too,
Besides a cove who deals in wood,
And makes his bundles small,
And looks as black on Sunday
As the Undertaker's pall.

You must not buy, you must not sell,
Oh! is it not a shame?
It is shocking place to dwell,
About sweet Leather Lane.

The Butcher does not like to hear
His neighbours holloa, buy!
Although he on the Sunday
Sells a little on the sly;
And Coffin Maker struts along
Just like the great Lord Mayor,
To bury folks on Sundays,
Instead of going to prayers.

You must not buy, you must not sell,
Oh! is it not a shame?
It is shocking place to dwell,
About sweet Leather Lane.

— Anonymous, Queer Doings in Leather-lane, London Labour and the London Poor

=== Management by the police (1867–1927) ===
In 1867, section six of the Metropolitan Streets Act effectively prohibited street trading. Following public meetings and press criticism, the act was amended within weeks. Section one of the Metropolitan Streets Act Amendment Act 1867 exempted traders but they were now subject to regulation by the police.

The late nineteenth century saw the closure of Brooke's Market following the 1869 establishment, by the City of London, of the new Smithfield butchers market.

In 1893 the London County Council’s Public Control Committee states that the Market “has existed since time immemorial” and describes 148 stalls selling: fish and meat, flowers, fruit & veg, sweets, drapery, earthenware, old clothes, old books, ironware, and footwear.

Of 148 stalls 26 are recorded as being run by Leather Lane shopkeepers. Already the market is described as primarily serving people working in the area.

The market is a convenience to the general public, and also to the shopkeepers, the latter valuing it principally because of the trade it brings.

— London Markets, Special Report of the Public Control Committee

By 1913 with the continuing commercialisation and industrialization of the Hatton Garden area the market had evolved into a lunch market catering to the needs of people working in local factories and offices.

=== Management by local councils (1927–present) ===
==== Metropolitan Borough of Holborn (1927–1965) ====
The London County Council (General Powers) Act 1927 replaced police regulation with a new licensing regime administered by metropolitan borough councils. From 1927 to 1965 the market was managed by the Metropolitan Borough of Holborn.

In the mid-1930s Mary Benedetta found the market still a mix of fresh and ready-to-eat food, flowers and plants, and household goods.

==== London Borough of Camden (1965–present) ====
In 1965 the Borough of Holborn was abolished and its area became part of the London Borough of Camden.

The Council placed limitations on the number of stalls selling similar products and strictly limited the number of stalls trading ready-to-eat food. By the late nineties the traditional shops had largely given way to casual dining. The licensing system led to issues with subletting of stalls where due to a sixteen-year waiting list for licences, people on the waiting list would rent their pitch to actual traders whilst remaining the technical licensee. For this reasons, the Council revoked 23 licences in the period 1990–93.

Following a period of decline for the market, in the 2000s, the Council relaxed its restrictions on ready to eat food and Leather Lane, again, became one of the largest street food markets in London. Middle Eastern food proliferated on the market in both shops and stalls leading to competitions to determine the best falafel available. The return to street food and the revived success of the market saw a return to the tensions that had beset the market in the mid-nineteenth century with some shopkeepers calling for the commodities of the traders to be restricted and the number of pitches reduced.

== Transport ==
=== Bus ===
Bus Routes 17, 46, 55, 243, and 341.

=== Railway and tube ===
The nearest stations are Chancery Lane and Farringdon.
