= The Mint in Southwark Act 1722 =

Act of the Parliament of Great Britain

- Act of Parliament
- Parliament of Great Britain
- Long title: An Act for the more effectual Execution of Justice in a pretended privileged Place, in the Parish of St. George, in the County of Surrey, commonly called The Mint; and for bringing to speedy and exemplary Justice such Offenders as are therein mentioned; and for giving Relief to such Persons as are proper Objects of Charity and Compassion there.
- Citation: 9 Geo. 1. c. 28
- Territorial extent: Great Britain

Dates
- Royal assent: 27 May 1723
- Commencement: 10 October 1723 (Note: Section 1.)
- Repealed: 15 July 1867
Other legislation
Amended by	Capital Punishment Act 1820
Repealed by	Statute Law Revision Act 1867
Relates to	Escape of Debtors, etc. Act 1696; Shelterers in Wapping, Stepney, etc. Act 1724

Status: Repealed

Text of statute as originally enacted

The Mint in Southwark Act 1722 (9 Geo. 1. c. 28) was an act of the Parliament of Great Britain. It was passed to remove certain legal privileges of The Mint, a location in Southwark which had become the haunt of debtors, and to allow the Sheriff of Surrey to enter and remove them.

== Subsequent developments ==
The act was substantially repealed by sections 1 and 2 of the Capital Punishment Act 1820 (1 Geo. 4. c. 116), which came into force on 25 July 1820.

The whole act was repealed by section 1 of, and the schedule to, the Statute Law Revision Act 1867 (30 & 31 Vict. c. 59), which came into force on 15 July 1867.

== See also ==
- Escape of Debtors, etc. Act 1696
- The Marshalsea debtors' prison

== Bibliography ==
- 'Book 1, Ch. 19: George I', A New History of London: Including Westminster and Southwark (1773), pp. 306–25. URL: http://www.british-history.ac.uk/report.asp?compid=46736. Date accessed: 20 November 2006.
- The text of the act
