= Worshipful Company of Glaziers and Painters of Glass =

Livery company of the City of London

Coordinates: 51°30′24.15″N 0°5′19.26″W

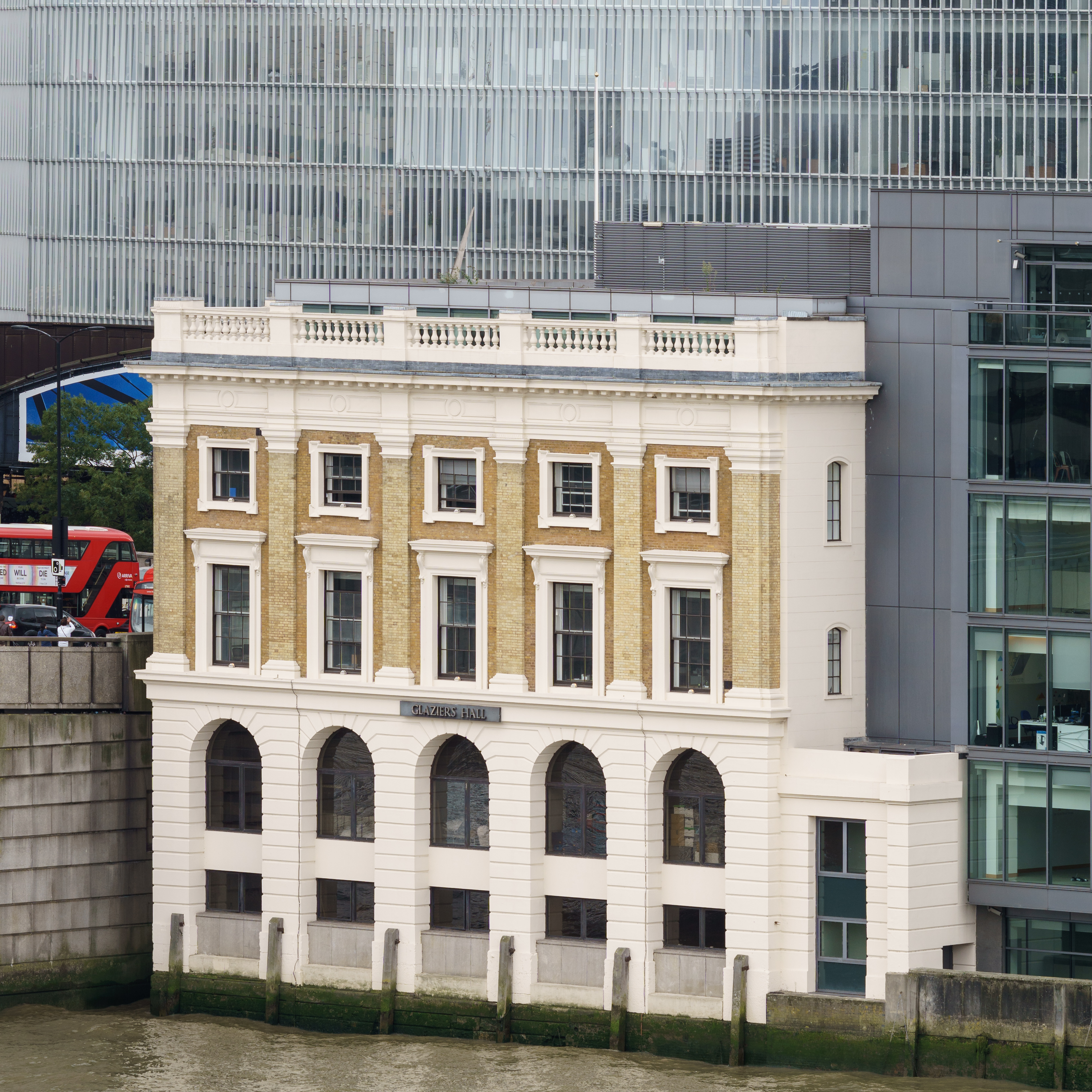
The rear of Glaziers Hall, on the south bank of the River Thames

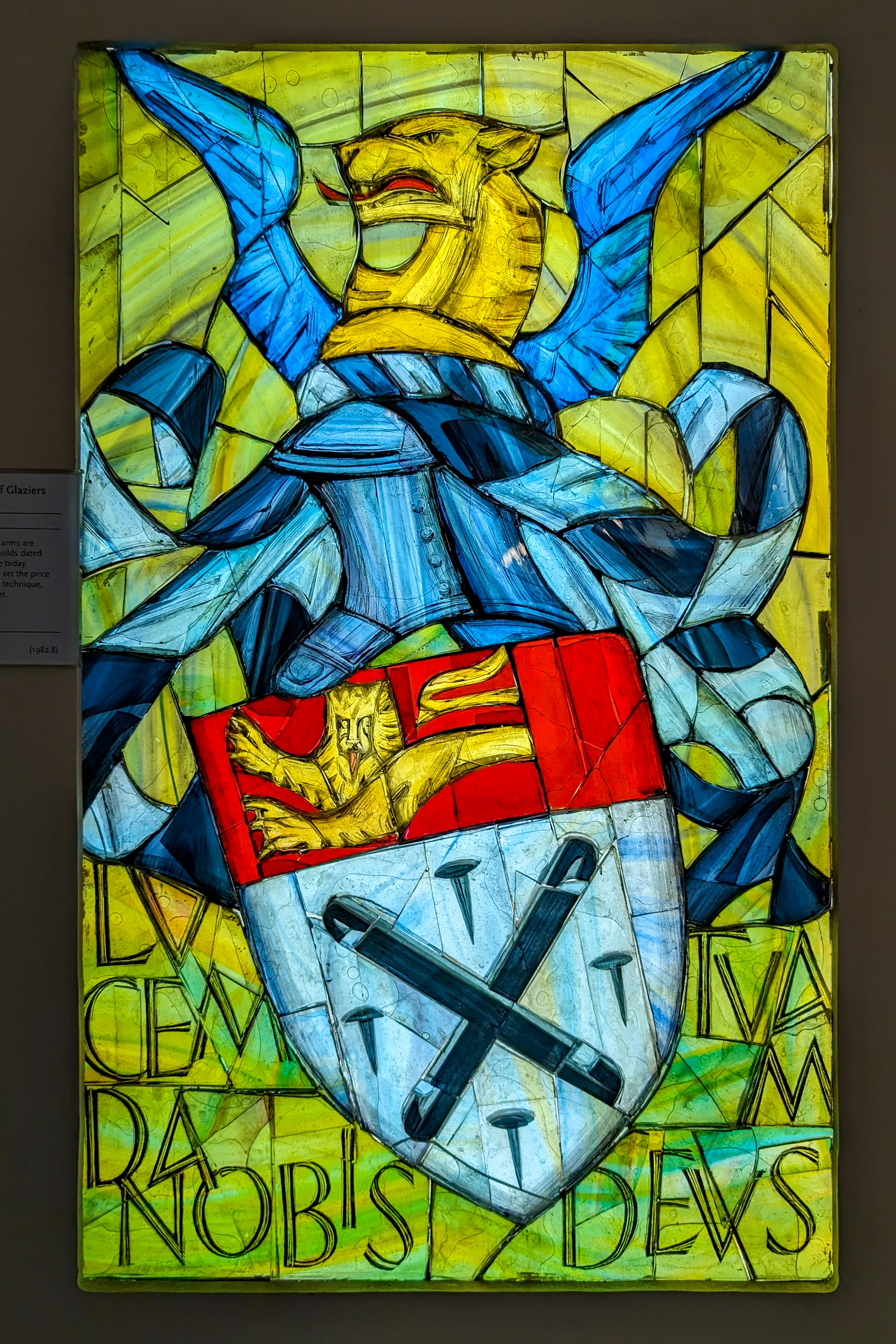
Arms of the company in stained glass by Moira Forsyth in the collection of the Stained Glass Museum

The Worshipful Company of Glaziers and Painters of Glass is one of the livery companies of the City of London. The Guild of Glaziers, or makers of Glass, the company's forerunner, existed as early as the fourteenth century. It received a royal charter of incorporation in 1638. It is no longer a trade association of glass craftsmen, instead existing, along with a majority of livery companies, as a charitable body.

The original Glaziers Hall was burnt down during the Great Fire of London in 1666. The current Hall was acquired and refurbished in 1977. It is located on the south side of London Bridge on Montague Close in the London Borough of Southwark and has views over the River Thames towards the City of London.

The company ranks fifty-third in the order of precedence for livery companies. Its motto is Lucem Tuam Da Nobis O Deus, Latin for "O God, Give Us Your Light".

The charitable activities of the Glaziers’ Company are mainly, but not exclusively, focused on stained glass, and are managed by the Glaziers' Foundation, a registered Charity, No 1143700. The foundation has four committees that were previously self-standing charities: the Glaziers' Trust, the London Stained Glass Repository, the Charity for Relief in Need and the Cutter Trust.

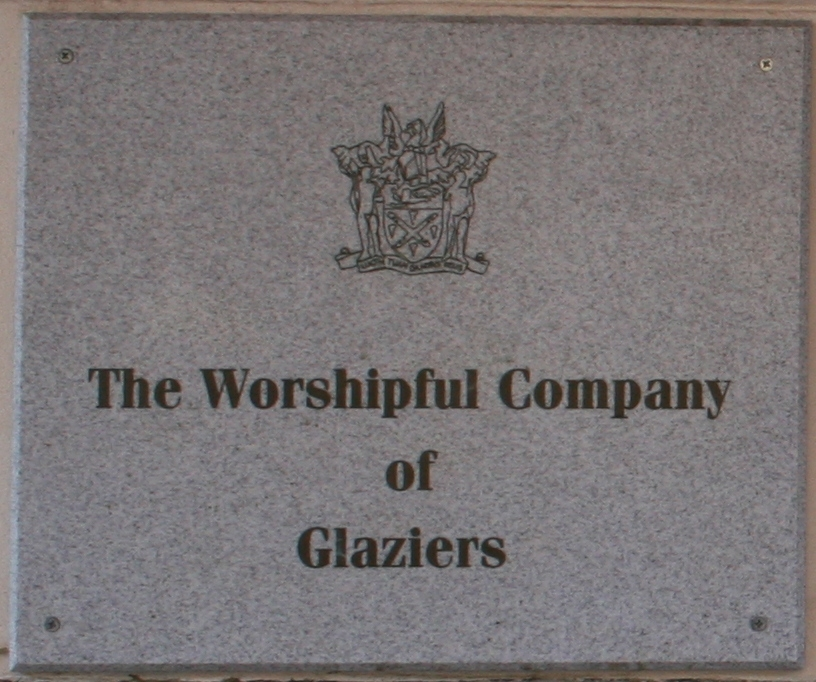
Plaque

The Glaziers’ Trust has the largest budget and has three principal objects: assisting with the restoration and conservation of historic and important stained glass, supporting the education and training of glass artists and conservators and fostering public information and awareness. The board of the trust sits four times a year to consider applications for stained glass conservation and restoration grants. To maintain the highest professional standards it is a condition of grant that remedial work is carried out by an accredited glazier or glass conservator.

The trust is usually unable to fund the cost of an entire restoration project and normally provides only partial funding. However, such is the depth of knowledge and experience on the board that its approval for a project, even if it results in only a modest award, is regularly used by applicants to help raise funds from other organisations.

The trust also supports other organisations within the stained glass community such as the British Society of Master Glass Painters and the Stained Glass Museum in Ely, Cambridgeshire. Both of these receive an annual grant to help them continue their work. The trust also supports the much-respected publication, “Vidimus”, the only online journal devoted to stained glass.

Through the foundation's Craft and Competitions Committee, the trust funds several educational initiatives such as the Stevens Competition. This is a nationwide competition for architectural glass design and we believe it to be the only national competition of its kind. It attracts entries from young artists, which are judged by a panel of prominent craftsmen. Sponsors of the competition regularly commission work from among the entries and the careers of many young artists have been launched by participation in the competition.

The Award for Excellence and the Ashton Hill Awards provide opportunities for those wishing to pursue a practical career in stained glass. They provide the funds for placements in working studios where mentored and supervised work experience takes place. The Award for Excellence provides 40 weeks of placements and the Ashton Hill Awards 10 weeks. The Arthur and Helen Davis Travelling Scholarships provide opportunities for the study of glass outside the UK. Recent awardees have studied in the United States, Iceland, France, Germany and the Czech Republic.

Continuing Professional Development Awards are available for practitioners wishing to broaden their skills either artistically or by attaining accredited conservator status.

The London Stained Glass Repository (LSGR) rescues and relocates good quality stained glass, principally from redundant churches. In addition to building closure, glass may need to be rescued and protected from the threat of vandalism. Rescued glass is available free of charge for installation in any suitable building to which the public has access.

Once vulnerable glass has been identified the Management Committee of the LSGR assesses its artistic merit, state of repair and general condition. When this work has been done negotiations for the release and storage of the glass begin. Once in store, the glass is photographed, catalogued and all relevant information recorded. Only then can a new home be sought with most of the glass going to religious buildings. The LSGR does not limit its activities to the UK, and glass has been relocated in the United States, Australia, the Falkland Islands, and Croatia. Glass can be lent to museums or included in educational projects at home and abroad.

The company awards grants to churches and other public buildings for restoring and conserving stained glass.
