= Leather Lane =

Street in Holborn, London

Coordinates: 51°31′12″N 0°6′34″W

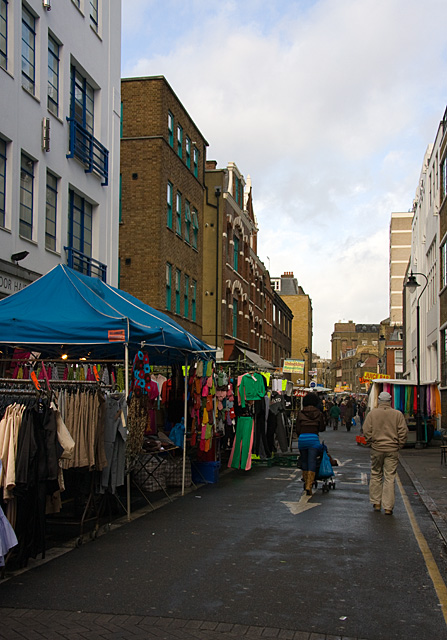
- London borough: Camden
- Ceremonial county: Greater London
- Region: London
- Country: England
- Sovereign state: United Kingdom
- Post town: LONDON
- Postcode district: EC1
- Dialling code: 020
- Police: Metropolitan
- Fire: London
- Ambulance: London
- UK Parliament: Holborn and St. Pancras
- London Assembly: Barnet and Camden

Leather Lane is a street west of Hatton Garden, in the Holborn area of London. It is home to a well-used weekday market which specialises in clothing, footwear and fruit and vegetables. There are now many food retailers capitalising off the lunchtime trade offering a range of different foods from falafel wraps and burritos to hog roasts and jacket potatoes.

The lane was laid out in the medieval period following old fields and property boundaries.

The Bourne Estate is a group of well-regarded Edwardian tenement blocks on the west side of the Lane.
