= Montague Close =

Street in London

Coordinates: 51°30′23.78″N 0°5′21.66″W

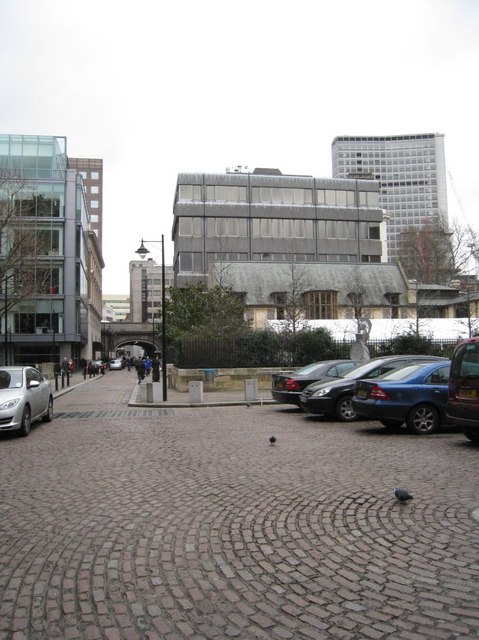
View along Montague Close.

Montague Close is a street in London, England, close to London Bridge in London SE1, within the London Borough of Southwark.

The Worshipful Company of Glaziers is located here. To the south are Southwark Cathedral and Borough Market.

The close occupies the site of the monastic buildings of the Priory of St Mary Overie, which were granted to Anthony Browne in 1544-1545. Browne's son was created Viscount Montague.

== Gallery ==
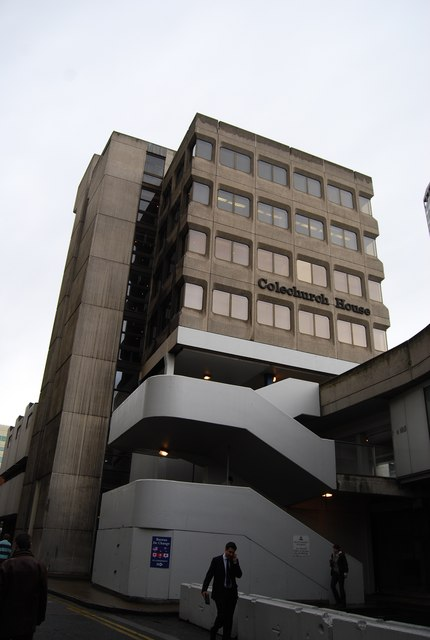
Colechurch House in Montague Close

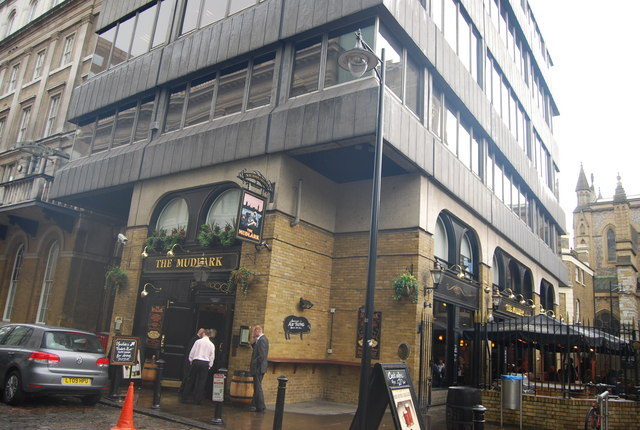
The Mudlark public house in Montague Close

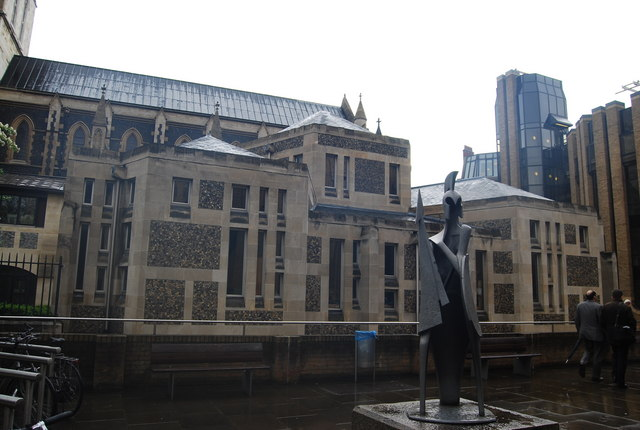
Statue outside Southwark Cathedral in Montague Close
