= Panton Square =

Demolished square in London

Coordinates: 51.510621°N 0.133156°W

A print of Panton Square in 1855

Panton Square was a street and small town square in London just to the west Leicester Square. Alongside Panton Street which still exists, it is named after the gambler Thomas Panton who after substantial winnings retired from games of chance and developed the area.

== History and description ==
The street was laid out beginning in 1673 on land that had once been owned by the Mercers' Company before changing hands and eventually ending up in the ownership of Thomas Panton. Building in the area at the time was supervised by Christopher Wren as Charles II wish to see the area developed. By 1681 it was being described as "Panton Yard" but was actually three interconnected yards. The land passed on Panton's death to the Arundell family through his son-in-law Henry Arundell, 5th Baron Arundell of Wardour.

In 1720, John Strype writing in his survey, described that the area was "designed to be built into Streets, taking up a large Piece of Ground, and, according to Probability, will turn to better Advantage than at present". It was around this time the area came to be known as Panton Square, with a number of new houses going up. It remained in the possession of the Arundell family until in 1919 when it was sold to J. Lyons and Co. With a 1913 act of parliament giving permission for its redevelopment, J Lyons and Co. demolished the houses and replaced them with an extension to their coventry street Corner House. It is now occupied by the former buildings of the London Trocadero.

Notable residents of the square include American-born British painter Benjamin West, French poet Stéphane Mallarmé.

=== Moroccan Ambassador affair ===
According to John O'Keefe, in 1762 there was an incident involving the Moroccan Ambassador who was living in the square at the time. He tells the story in his 1826 Recollections.

The Morocco Ambassador lived in Panton Square, near Coventry Street. One of his attendants happened to displease him: he had him brought up to the garret, and there sliced his head off. It was no secret: he and his servants thought it was very proper, but the London people, who had somewhat of Christainity, were of another opinion. I saw a violent party gather before the house: they broke into it, demolished the furniture, threw everything they could lay their hands on out of the windows, and thrashed and beat the grand Moor and his retinue down the Haymarket.

There exist no other sources on the incident.
