= Holder Mathias =

British architectural firm

- Holder Mathias Architects Limited
- Formation: 1969; 57 years ago
- Founder: Peter Mathias; Tim Holder
- Legal status: Private limited company
- Headquarters: 5th Floor Clareville House, Oxendon Street, London, SW1Y 4EL
- Subsidiaries: Taylor Clark Architects
- Website: holdermathias.com

Holder Mathias Architects Limited, often simply known as Holder Mathias or Holder Mathias Architects, is an architectural firm and private limited company based in London, England. The firm was founded in 1969, in Cardiff, Wales, by architects Peter Mathias and Tim Holder as the Holder and Mathias Partnership. It was responsible for the Atlantic Wharf development and the eastern portion of the Cardiff Bay redevelopment project, including Crickhowell House and the Red Dragon Centre.

Holder Mathias has an American subsidiary, Taylor Clark Architects, which it uses as its international arm.

== History ==
Tim Holder and Peter Mathias founded the Holder and Mathias Partnership in Cardiff, Wales, in 1969. The firm was originally based from Holder's home in Rumney, in an office above his garage. In an interview with the South Wales Echo from 1987, Holder stated that the duo initially planned for the firm to become a "medium-sized firm for Cardiff" with 20 employees. In 1970, the firm was relocated to offices in Four Elms Road, Cardiff, where the duo were then joined by a third partner, Bryan Alcock. In the late 1970s, the firm acquired Associated Dairies, then a minor but growing dairy company in Leeds, England. Associated Dairies later became the supermarket chain Asda, with the firm's work expanding to cover several towns and retail projects across the United Kingdom as a result. The firm continued to expand significantly over the rest of the decade, which led to the opening of an office in London in 1978. By 1987, the firm had grown to 160 employees, with 95 of these based in London and 65 based in Cardiff. By this time, it had been the architect of 15 Asda stores, Prince Philip Hospital in Llanelli, Cromwell Hospital in London, a military hospital in Saudi Arabia, two projects in the London Docklands at a cost of £80 million, and Cardiff's Leckwith development.

In 1984, the firm put forward a successful bid to redevelop the derelict Bute East Dock area of Cardiff, which would become the first part of the wider Cardiff Bay redevelopment project. Later known as the Atlantic Wharf development, Mathias, Holder and Alcock designed the project at a cost of £50 million. In 1987, the firm purchased the area's abandoned bonded warehouse, which it restored and redeveloped into its new headquarters and the centre of the new development, becoming the first firm to relocate to the Cardiff Bay redevelopment area. During the same period, the firm expanded its operations in London. As a result, it was commissioned to deliver multiple residential developments, such as the Free Trade Wharf. The firm later designed the eastern portion of the wider Cardiff Bay redevelopment project, designing and constructing more than 30 projects in the area over the next two decades. Such projects included the Red Dragon Centre, Crickhowell House and the Atradius building. In the 1980s, it also formed an American subsidiary and international arm, Taylor Clark Architects, to compete internationally.

The firm continued to design several major projects in the early 1990s, most notably the Oasis Holiday Village development in Cumbria for Centre Parcs, which became another regular client of the firm. Other clients included 3M, Sony and Hewlett Packard, with the firm active in the London Docklands, the Roath basin and Cardiff. In the late 1990s, the firm expanded its operations into Europe, establishing an architectural partnership in Munich, Germany, in 1999 and participating in multiple retail developments throughout the continent. Developments from the firm in the UK included the St Stephen's shopping centre in Hull, which costed £90 million, and several projects for Centre Parcs in Woburn and Cumbria. Co-founder Peter Mathias announced his retirement in 2013.

In November 2023, housing firm Taylor Wimpey launched a £50 million damages claim against Holder Mathias over alleged defects in its 450-home development at Victoria Wharf in Cardiff Bay. A 2019 survey of the building had found fire safety defects with its cladding, cavity barriers and insulation, which Taylor Wimpey said constituted "an imminent danger to the health and safety" of residents and "rendered the apartments unfit for human habitation". Holder Mathias denied the claims, as design of the external wall systems had been undertaken by contractor Taylor Woodrow, façade design subcontractor SERS and suppliers Alsecco, Envirowall and Eternit.

== Organisation ==
Holder Mathis is registered in England and Wales as a private limited company, with architectural activities as its stated nature of business. It was originally named the Holder and Mathias Partnership from 1969, but changed its name to Filbuk 98 Limited in March 1987. In July 1987, its name was again changed to Holder Mathias Limited, before the firm reverted to Holder and Mathias Partnership Limited later that month. It changed its name again in October 1987, becoming Holder Mathias Alcock PLC, which remained its name until October 2002. In October 2002, its name was changed to Holder Mathias Architects PLC. Since 2009, it has been named Holder Mathias LLP.
