= John Bogle (artist) =

Scottish miniature painter (1746–1803)

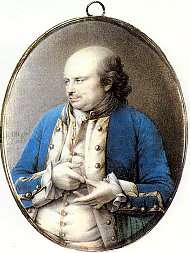
Commodore George Johnstone, now in the Scottish National Portrait Gallery.

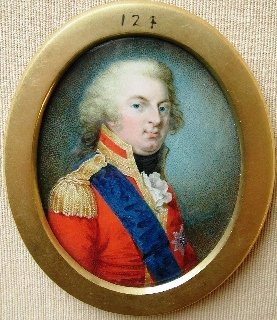
Prince Frederick, Duke of York and Albany, c. 1793

John Bogle (c. 1744 – 21 April 1803) was a Scottish miniature painter.

== Biography ==
Bogle was the son of an excise officer also called John. He attended classes at a drawing school in Glasgow founded in 1753 by the printers and booksellers Robert and Andrew Foulis.

Bogle married in 1769, and in that year and the next exhibited miniatures at the Society of Artists in London from an address in Edinburgh. He then moved to London, exhibiting at the Royal Academy from 1772 to 1794, including a self-portrait of 1772. His address is given throughout this time as 1, Panton Square. He painted a miniature of the novelist Fanny Burney in June 1783, and in 1790 he accompanied her to the trial of Warren Hastings in Westminster Hall.

He moved back to Scotland in 1800 with his wife. He died in Edinburgh in 1803, aged 59.
