= Leicester Square =

Pedestrianised square in London, United Kingdom

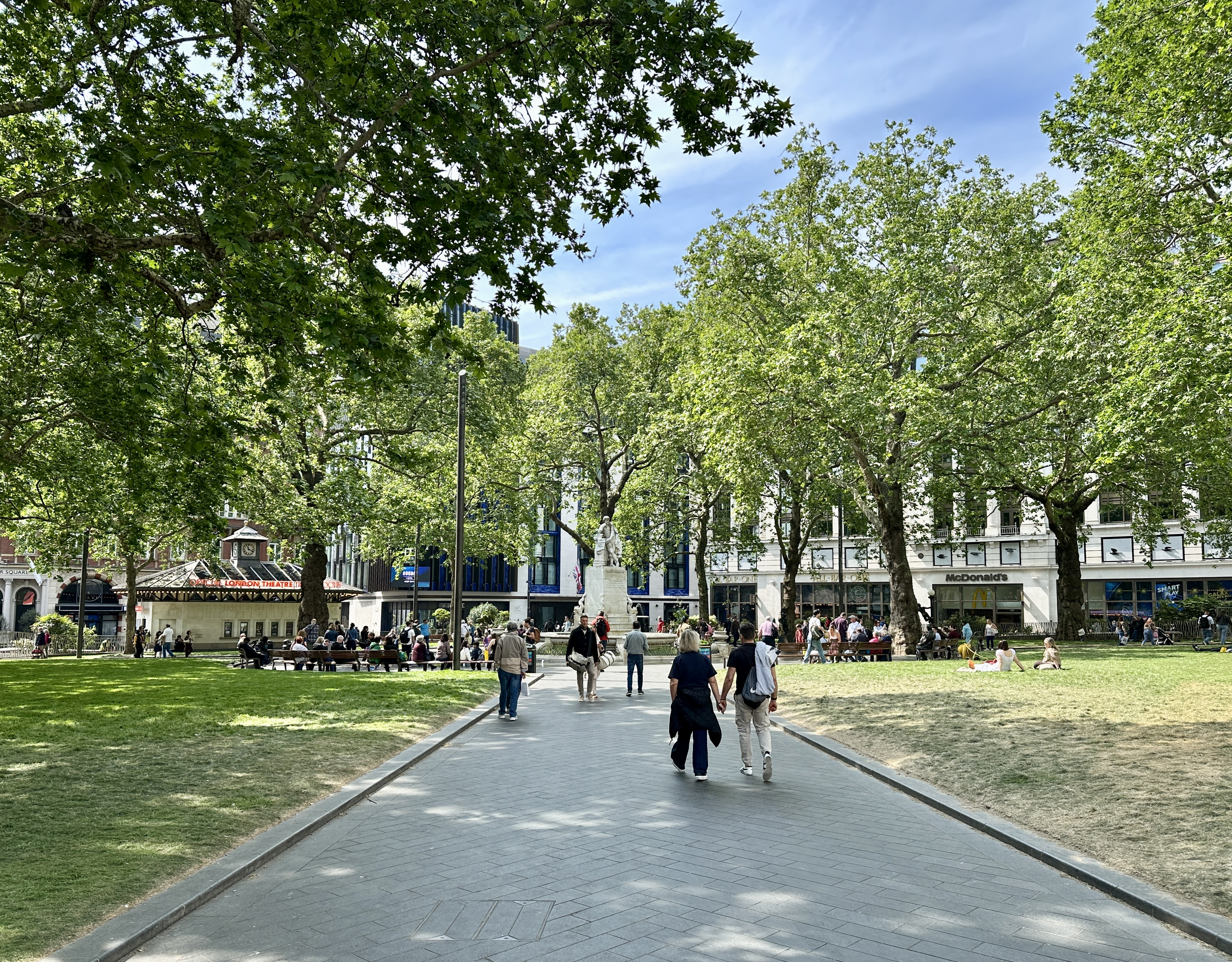
- Leicester Square in 2026

- Location within City of Westminster
- Maintained by: Westminster City Council
- Location: City of Westminster, Central London
- Postal code: WC2
- Nearest tube station: Leicester Square
- Coordinates: 51.5104°N 0.1301°W

Construction
- Inauguration: 1670

Other
- Designer: Robert Sidney, 2nd Earl of Leicester
- Known for: Odeon Leicester Square; Empire, Leicester Square; Odeon West End; World's largest Lego store
- Website: www.leicestersquare.london

Leicester Square (/ˈlɛstər/ LEST-ər) is a pedestrianised square in the West End of London, England, and is the centre of London's entertainment district. It was laid out in 1670 as Leicester Fields, which was named after the recently built Leicester House, itself named after Robert Sidney, 2nd Earl of Leicester. The square was originally a gentrified residential area, with tenants including Frederick, Prince of Wales and the artists William Hogarth and Joshua Reynolds. It became more down-market in the late 18th century as Leicester House was demolished and retail developments took place, becoming a centre for entertainment. Major theatres were built in the 19th century, which were converted to cinemas towards the middle of the next. Leicester Square is the location of nationally significant cinemas such as the Odeon Luxe Leicester Square and Empire, Leicester Square, which are often used for film premieres in London. The nearby Prince Charles Cinema is known for its screenings of cult films and marathon film runs. The square remains a tourist attraction which hosts events, including for the Chinese New Year.

The square has always had a park in its centre, which was originally common land. The park's fortunes have varied over the centuries, reaching near dilapidation in the mid-19th century after changing ownership several times. It was restored under the direction of Albert Grant, which included the construction of four new statues and a fountain of William Shakespeare. The square was extensively refurbished and remodelled for the 2012 Summer Olympics at a cost of more than £15 million.

== Geography ==
The square lies within an area bound by Lisle Street, to the north; Charing Cross Road, to the east; Orange Street, to the south; and Whitcomb Street, to the west. The park at the centre of the square is bound by Cranbourn Street, to the north; Leicester Street, to the east; Irving Street, to the south; and a section of road designated simply as Leicester Square, to the west. It is within the City of Westminster, north of Trafalgar Square, east of Piccadilly Circus, west of Covent Garden, and south of Cambridge Circus.

The nearest London Underground station is Leicester Square, which opened in 1906. London bus routes 24, 29 and 176 run on nearby Charing Cross Road.

Leicester Square has also been used as the name for the immediate surrounding area, roughly corresponding with Coventry Street, Cranbourn Street, Charing Cross Road and St Martin's Street. This includes Bear Street, Haymarket, Hobhouse Court (named after Sir John Cam Hobhouse), Hunt's Court (after Samuel Hunt, 17th century carpenter and leaseholder), Irving Street (after actor Henry Irving), Orange Street (named after William III, Prince of Orange), Oxendon Street (after Sir Henry Oxenden, 1st Baronet), Panton Street (after local property dealer Thomas Panton), and Trafalgar Square.

== History ==
=== 16th–18th centuries ===
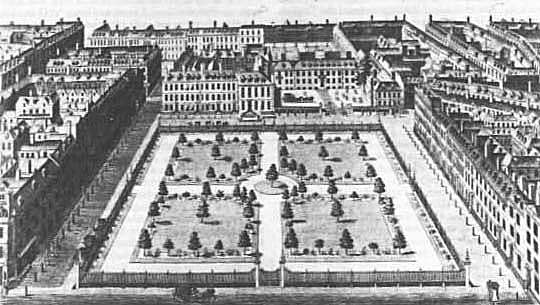
Leicester Square in 1750, looking north towards Leicester House, then one of the largest houses in London.

The land where Leicester Square now lies once belonged to the Abbot and Convent of Westminster Abbey and the Beaumont family. In 1536, Henry VIII took control of 3 acres (1.2 ha) of land around the square, with the remaining 4 acres (1.6 ha) being transferred to the king the following year. The square is named after Robert Sidney, 2nd Earl of Leicester, who purchased this land in 1630. By 1635, he had built himself a large house, Leicester House, at the northern end. The area in front of the house was then enclosed, depriving inhabitants of St Martin in the Fields parish of their right to use the previously common land. The parishioners appealed to King Charles I, and he appointed three members of the privy council to arbitrate. Lord Leicester was ordered to keep part of his land (thereafter known as Leicester Fields and later as Leicester Square) open for the parishioners.

The square was laid out to the south of Leicester House and developed in the 1670s. The area was originally entirely residential, with properties laid out in a similar style to nearby Pall Mall. In 1687, the northern part of the square became part of the new parish of St Anne, Soho. The 7th Earl of Leicester took ownership of the property in 1728 and it was the residence of Frederick, Prince of Wales, from 1742 until his death in 1751 and that of his wife Princess Augusta until 1771. The poet Matthew Prior lived at what is now No. 21 around 1700 and artist William Hogarth resided at No 30 between 1733 and 1764, where he produced some of his best known works including Gin Lane. The magistrate Thomas de Veil, later to found Bow Street Magistrates' Court, lived at No 40 between 1729 and 1737; this location is now The Londoner hotel and Odeon Luxe West End cinema. The painter Joshua Reynolds lived at No 47 from 1760 until his death in 1792; this location is now Fanum House, once the Automobile Association head office.

At the end of the 17th century, Lord Leicester's heir, Philip Sidney, 3rd Earl of Leicester, permitted a small amount of retail development in booths along the front of Leicester House. A statue of George I was built on the square in 1760 following the coronation of his great-grandson, George III. The square remained fashionable throughout most of the 18th century, with notable residents including the architect James Stuart at No 35 from 1766 to 1788 and the painter John Singleton Copley at No. 28 from 1776 to 1783.

Leicester House was intermittently inhabited during the mid-18th century, and was finally sold to the naturalist Ashton Lever in 1775. Lever turned the house into a museum with a significant amount of natural history objects. In turn, the square began to serve as a venue for popular entertainments. Brothels began to appear around Leicester Square during the century, and visitors could pay to watch the severed heads of traitors executed at Temple Bar through a telescope. Leicester House became home of a museum of natural curiosities called the Holophusikon in the 1780s. It was demolished in 1791–72 due to rising debts following the extinction of the Leicester peerage, and replaced by Leicester Place. That in turn was converted into a church in 1865 and is now the site of the Prince Charles Cinema.

In 1790, a new Royal Opera House was proposed to be built in Leicester Square. The scheme was led by the Prince of Wales, Francis Russell, 5th Duke of Bedford and James Cecil, 1st Marquess of Salisbury and aimed to re-establish London as a centre for Italian opera and ballet, with an opera house to rival those in mainland Europe. The opera house was never built, as the royal patent needed at that time to license a theatre was refused. The plans for the original design are preserved in Sir John Soane's Museum, while a 1790 painting by William Hodges, which displays the finished design, belongs to the Museum of London.

=== 19th–21st centuries ===
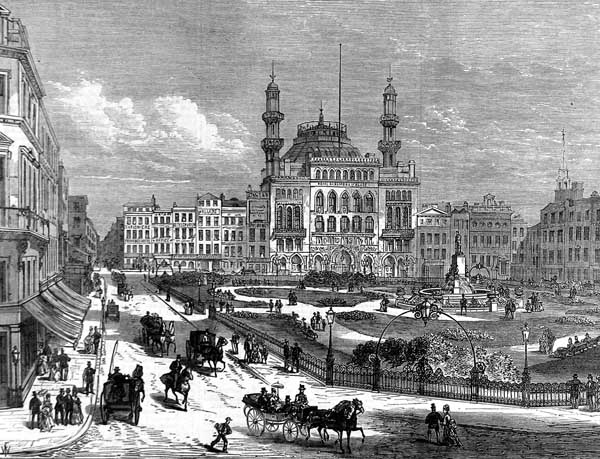
Leicester Square overlooked by the Alhambra Theatre in 1874

By the 19th century, Leicester Square was known as an entertainment venue, with many amusements peculiar to the era, including Wyld's Great Globe, which was built for the Great Exhibition of 1851 and housed a giant scale map of the Earth. (Note: The globe gave a complete view of the world at a scale of ten miles / inch. James Wyld constructed the globe as he believed it would show the importance of Britain and revitalise Leicester Square, which was becoming downtrodden by the 1850s.) The construction of New Coventry Street made it easier for traffic to access the square, resulting in private residences being replaced by shops, museums and exhibition centres. Savile House at No. 5–6, built in 1683 for Thomas Bruce, 2nd Earl of Ailesbury, had become a museum by this time, and was ultimately destroyed by fire in 1865. It was rebuilt as the Empire Theatre.

Several foreign-owned hotels were established around the square, making it popular with visitors to London. Brunet's Hôtel at No. 25 was opened by Louis Brunet in 1800, later expanding to Nos. 24 and 26 during the following decade. It was bought by Francis Jaunay in 1815 known as Jaunay's Hôtel. The Hôtel Sablonière et de Provence opened at No. 17–18 in 1845 as the Hôtel de Provence, and renamed in 1869. It closed in 1919 and became a public house. The Cavour, at No. 20 at the southeast of the square, opened in 1864. It was badly damaged in World War II but subsequently restored.

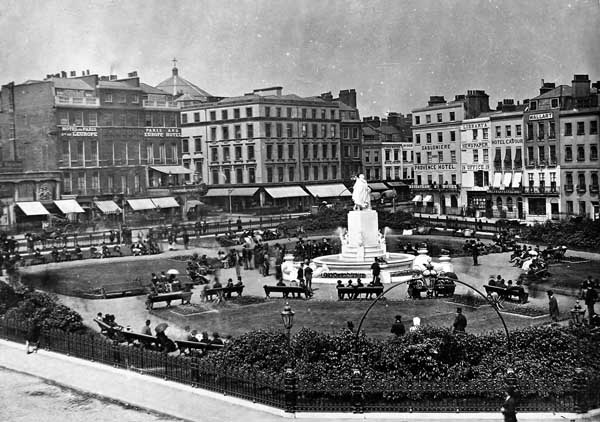
Leicester Square in 1880, looking north east

The Alhambra Theatre was built in 1854 on the east side of the square, dominating the site. It temporarily closed two years later when the original owner, Edward Clarke, became bankrupt, but then reopened in 1858 as the Alhambra Palace. It enjoyed a surge in popularity after Queen Victoria and family came to see "Black Eagle – The Horse of Beauty". It burned down in 1882, but reopened the following year. In the early 20th century, the theatre became a popular venue for ballet. It was demolished in 1936 and replaced by the Odeon Cinema. The Empire Theatre of Varieties opened in 1884 on the former site of Savile House, but had a troubled start, closing for a time, until the end of the decade. The theatre gained a reputation for high-class prostitutes frequenting the theatre, and in 1894 the London County Council ordered the promenade on the upper balcony to be remodelled. A young Winston Churchill, then a cadet at the Royal Military Academy Sandhurst, helped destroy canvas screens that had been erected to prevent access to the balcony. The theatre closed in 1927, to be replaced by the Empire Cinema.

During the Winter of Discontent, where the incumbent Labour Party struggled to meet demands of trade unions and a shrinking economy, refuse collectors went on strike in January 1979. Leicester Square was turned into a de facto dump, earning it the nickname of "Fester Square". In the 1980s, the square was pedestrianised, cutting off all vehicular traffic. Access to the square for goods and deliveries is now controlled by specially designated marshals.

By the start of the 21st century, Westminster City Council were concerned that the square was too dangerous at night, and wanted to demolish sections of it to encourage the growth of theatres and cinemas, and reduce popularity of nightclubs. In 2010, a major redevelopment of Leicester Square took place as part of a Great Outdoors scheme proposed by the Mayor of London, Boris Johnson. The improvements included 12,000 square metres (130,000 sq ft) of granite paving and a water feature surrounding the Shakespeare statue. The square re-opened in May 2012 after 17 months' work at a total cost of £15.3 million. The Greater London Authority said the refurbishments would accommodate more than 1,000 new jobs. The re-opening coincided with the 2012 Summer Olympics later that year.

== Features ==
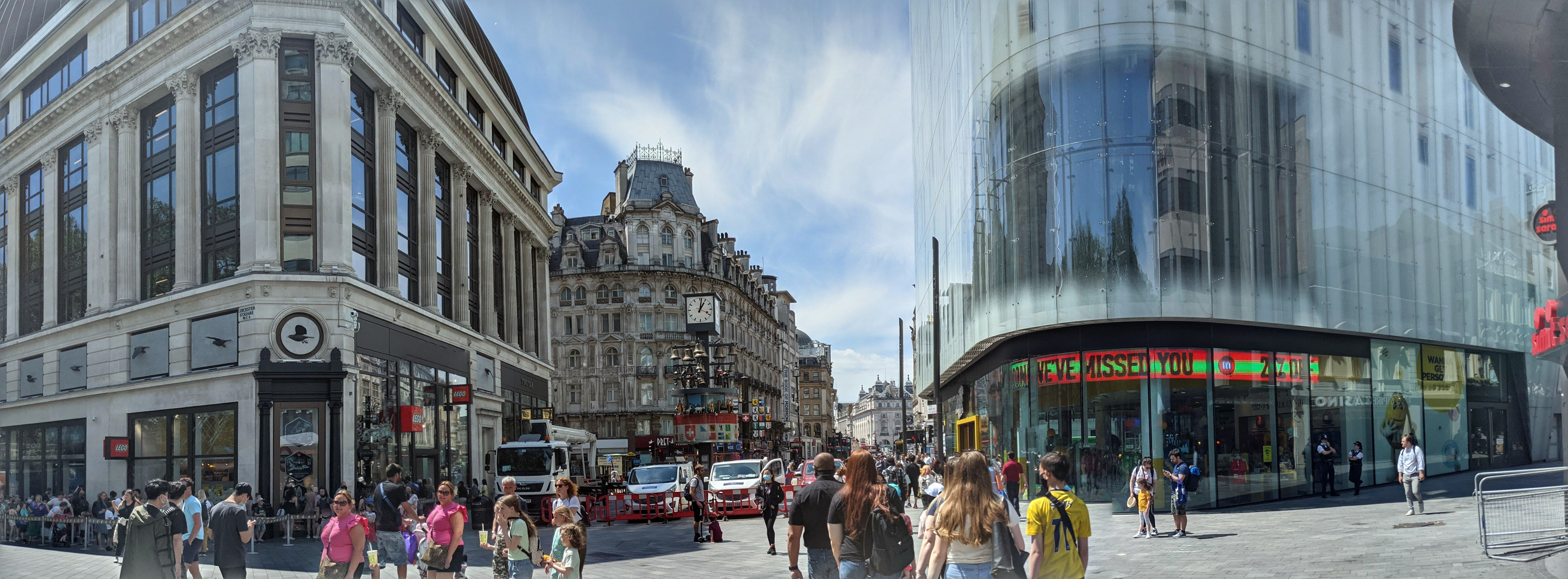
Panorama showing the Lego Store and M&M's World

=== Gardens square ===
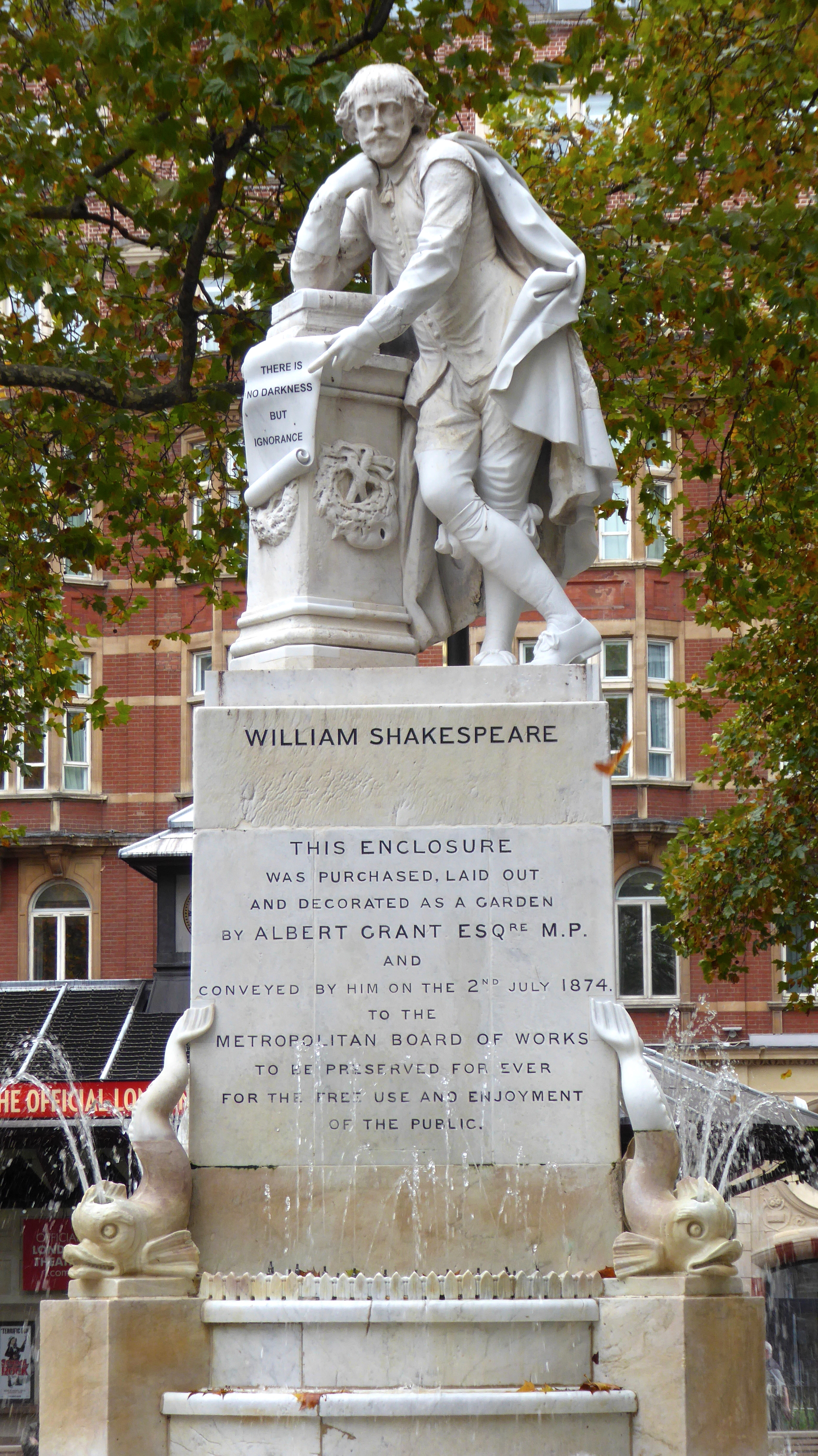
The Shakespeare fountain and statue

In the middle of the square is a small park that was originally available for common use on Lammas Day (12 August), such as washing clothes and herding cattle. The Earl of Leicester was obliged to preserve these grounds, which were separated from the rest of the square with railings. In 1808, the garden was sold by the Leicester Estate to Charles Elmes for £210 (equivalent to £16,040 in 2025), who neglected to maintain it. (Note: On Elmes' death, his executors were sued for neglect.) Ownership changed hands a number of times during the first half of the 19th century, including Robert Barren following Elmes' death in 1822, John Inderwick in 1834, and Hyam Hyams and Edward Moxhay in 1839. Little maintenance was done and the garden deteriorated to the point of severe dilapidation.

In 1848, the land was subject to the significant legal case of Tulk v Moxhay. The plot's previous owner, Moxhay, had agreed upon a covenant not to erect buildings but the law would not allow buyers who were not "privy" to the initial contract to be bound by subsequent promises. The judge, Lord Cottenham, decided that future owners of land could be bound by promises to abstain from activity, subject to the doctrine of notice (actual or constructive). Otherwise, a buyer could (re-)sell land to himself to undermine an initial promise. James Wyld bought the assets of the garden from the Tulk and Moxhay's death estates in 1849 to erect the Great Globe, though buried the statue of George I under 12 feet of earth with the globe stuck on top. The statue was uncovered following the globe's demise, but by 1866 it had deteriorated due to vandalism and was sold for £16. Arguments continued about the fate of the garden, with Charles Augustus Tulk's heirs erecting a wooden hoarding around the property in 1873. These were quickly removed after the Master of the Rolls ordered that the land must be preserved for its original purpose.

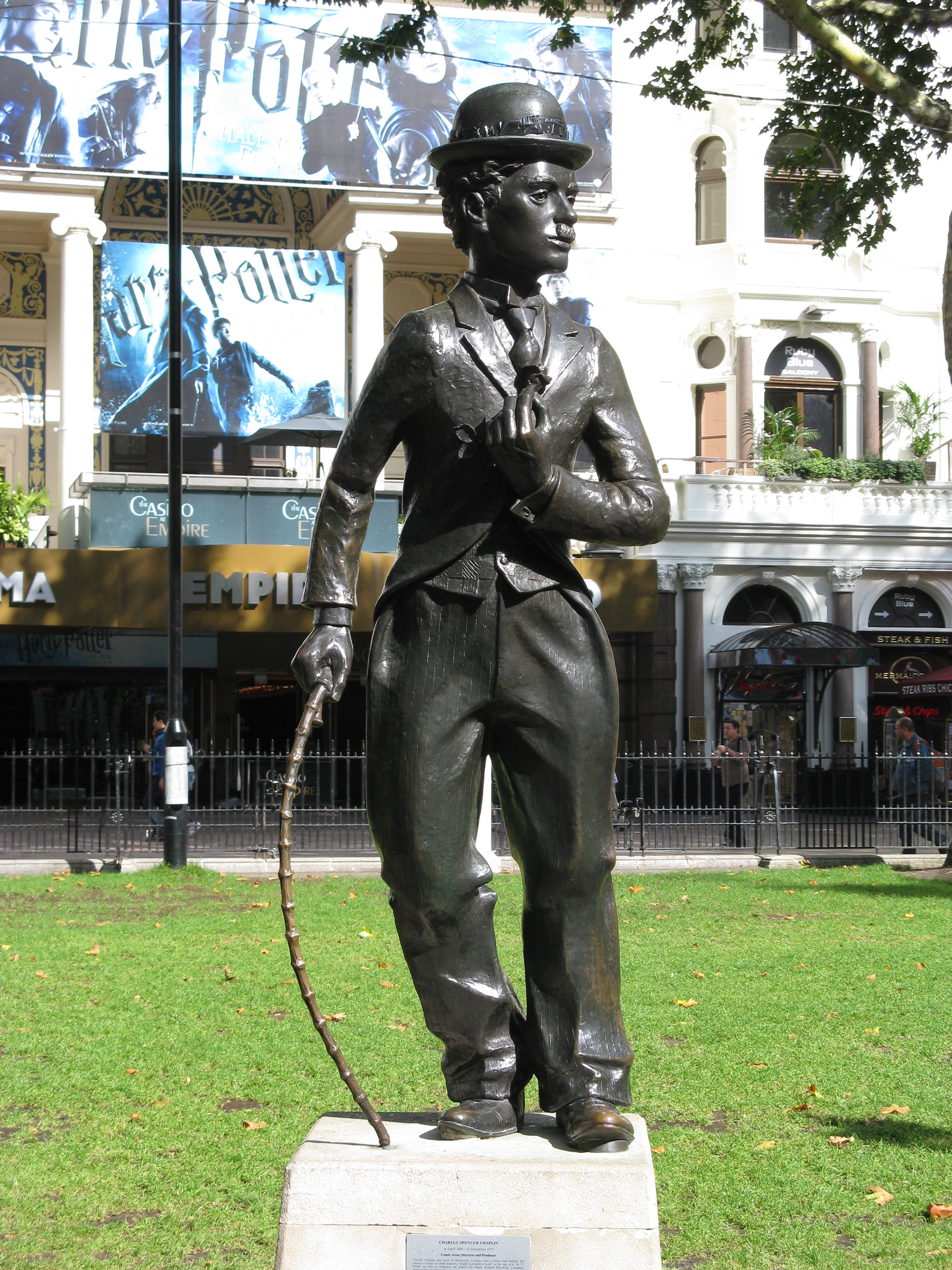
Charlie Chaplin statue

The garden was saved by the Member of Parliament (MP) Albert Grant, who purchased the park in 1874 for £11,060 and donated it to the Metropolitan Board of Works. The title deed for the square passed to the succeeding public bodies and is now in the ownership of the City of Westminster. After the purchase, the architect James Knowles redesigned the park. A statue of William Shakespeare surrounded by dolphins was constructed in the centre. The four corner gates of the park had one bust each of famous former residents in the square: the scientist Sir Isaac Newton designed by William Calder Marshall; Sir Joshua Reynolds, the first President of the Royal Academy by Henry Weekes; John Hunter, a pioneer of surgery, by Thomas Woolner; and William Hogarth, the painter, by Joseph Durham. (Note: The statues were designed to represent former residents in Leicester Square, but Newton actually lived in St. Martin's Street.) Ownership transferred to Westminster City Council in 1933. The most recent addition was a bronze statue of film star and director Sir Charlie Chaplin, designed by sculptor John Doubleday in 1981. On the pavement were inscribed the distances in miles to several Commonwealth countries, including Canada, Kenya and Jamaica. After the Great Outdoors refurbishment of the square, only the statue of Shakespeare still remains.

=== Entertainment ===
Since the 19th century, Leicester Square has been known for its entertainment venues, including the Alhambra and Empire theatres and the nearby Daly's Theatre, which opened in 1893, and the Hippodrome, which opened in 1900. One of the signs marking the square bears the legend "Theatreland". In the 20th century, most of these large theatres became cinemas and the area is the centre of London's cinema scene and the prime location in the United Kingdom for film premieres. Since the 1980s, it has hosted the London Film Festival each year. The Odeon Leicester Square, on the site of the old Alhambra theatre, is the cinema with the most seats in a single screen in the United Kingdom. Similar to Grauman's Chinese Theatre in Hollywood, the square was surrounded by floor mounted plaques with film stars' names and cast handprints. During the 2010–2012 refurbishment, many of the plaques were removed, confusing tourists who still expected to find them there.

In the 1950s, the Hippodrome became a nightclub and is now a casino.

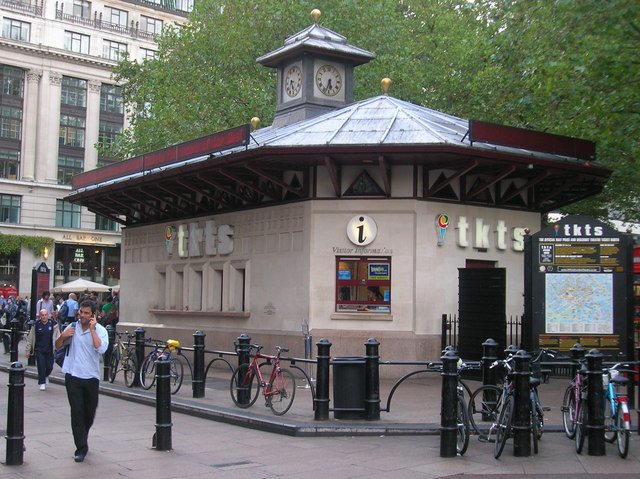
The TKTS booth in Leicester Square is the official place to purchase cheap theatre tickets in the West End besides being synonymous with London film premieres.

The Leicester Square Theatre is based in nearby Leicester Place. It was constructed in 1955 as a church, before becoming the Notre Dame Hall, then the Cavern in the Town, a popular live music venue in the 1960s. In the 1970s, it was renamed back to the Notre Dame Hall, where the Sex Pistols played one of their first gigs at the club on 15 November 1976. (Note: The gig occurred a little over two weeks before the Sex Pistols achieved national notoriety by appearing on ITV's Today with Bill Grundy.) It was converted into a theatre in 2002 as The Venue, and refurbished as the Leicester Square Theatre in 2008 (using the name of an earlier cinema).

The square has been the home for TKTS (originally known as the Official London Half-Price Theatre Ticket Booth), since 1980. Tickets for theatre performances taking place around the West End that day and during the week are sold from the booth at a significant discount. The popularity of the booth has given rise to other booths and stores around the square that advertise half-price tickets for West End shows. The Official London Theatre Guide recommends avoiding these booths as they are not official and do not contain the Society of Ticket Agents & Retailers (STAR) logo.

Global Radio has its headquarters on the east side of Leicester Square at No. 30, close to the Odeon. The building houses the radio stations Capital, Capital Xtra, Classic FM, Gold, Heart, LBC, Smooth Radio and Radio X.

==== Cinemas ====
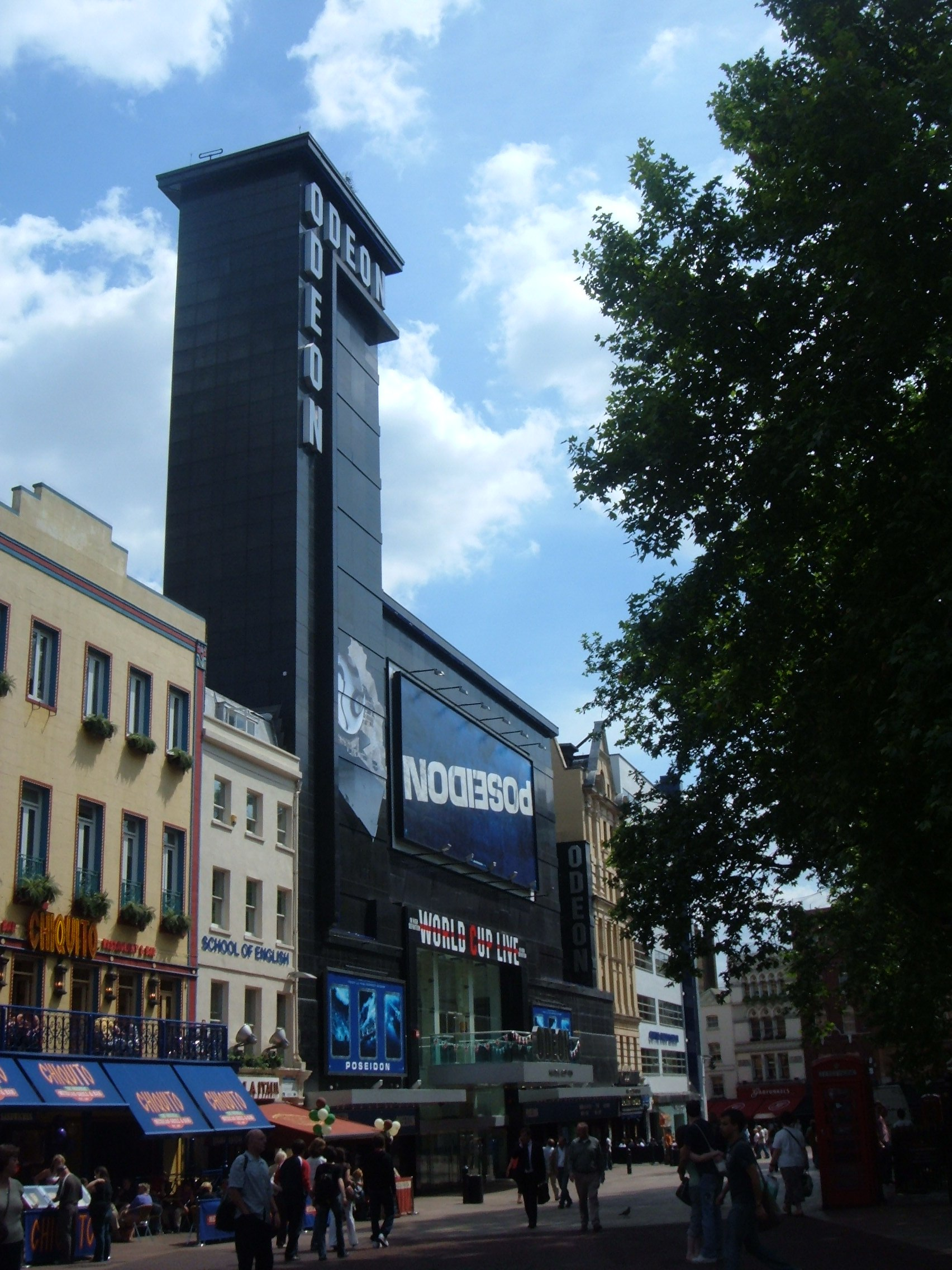
The Odeon Leicester Square in June 2006

The Empire theatre on the north side of the square was converted into a cinema in 1928. It was the largest on the square until 1959, when a new projection box was built in the centre of the stalls for Ben-Hur, reducing the seating capacity from 2,778 to 1,723. In 1961, the building was gutted and a new cinema and dance hall were built in the shell. In 2013 the main auditorium was divided into two screens, including an IMAX screen.

Adjoining the Empire was the Ritz Cinema, opened by MGM in 1937. It played Gone With the Wind for four years from 1940 to 1944. It became a second screen for the Empire in 1972 and was converted to a 4DX screen in 2018. In 2023 it was closed due to a dispute with the building's landlord.

On the south side, the Leicester Square Theatre opened in 1930. It was renamed the Odeon West End in 1988 and was earmarked for demolition in 2014, to be replaced by a ten-storey hotel including a two-screen cinema. The new cinema opened in 2021 as the Odeon Luxe West End.

The Odeon Leicester Square, which dominates the east side of the square, hosts many film premieres. Opened in 1937 on the site of the Alhambra Theatre, it originally had a capacity for 2,116 people, arranged in circle and stalls. Following changes at the Empire, in the 1960s it became the largest cinema on the square. It later became the largest cinema in the United Kingdom. The seating capacity was reduced to 800 following refurbishment in 2018.

On the other side of the Empire was the Queen's Hotel, which started showing newsreels in the 1930s and was then converted into a Jacey Cinema in 1960. It closed in 1978 and is now a casino.

The Warner Theatre, near the north east corner, opened in 1938 on the site of the former Daly's Theatre. The Warner was demolished and rebuilt in 1993. In 2004, it was taken over by Vue. In 2006, it was one of the first two cinemas in Europe to screen a film in Digital 3D with Chicken Little.

A short distance from the west of the square, on the south side of Panton Street, is the Odeon Panton Street. The Prince Charles Cinema, to the north of the square opened in 1962 with a "satellite dish" design where the audience looks upwards to the stage. The cinema became known for showing pornographic and erotic films during the 1970s, including Emmanuelle (1974). It later became a favourite venue for showing cult films, including The Rocky Horror Picture Show (1975) and a sing-along version of The Sound of Music (1965), and marathon performances including all seven Muppet films back to back. Prices are considerably cheaper than the main cinemas in the square; in 2013 a ticket for a new release at the Prince Charles cost £10, compared to £24 at the Odeon.

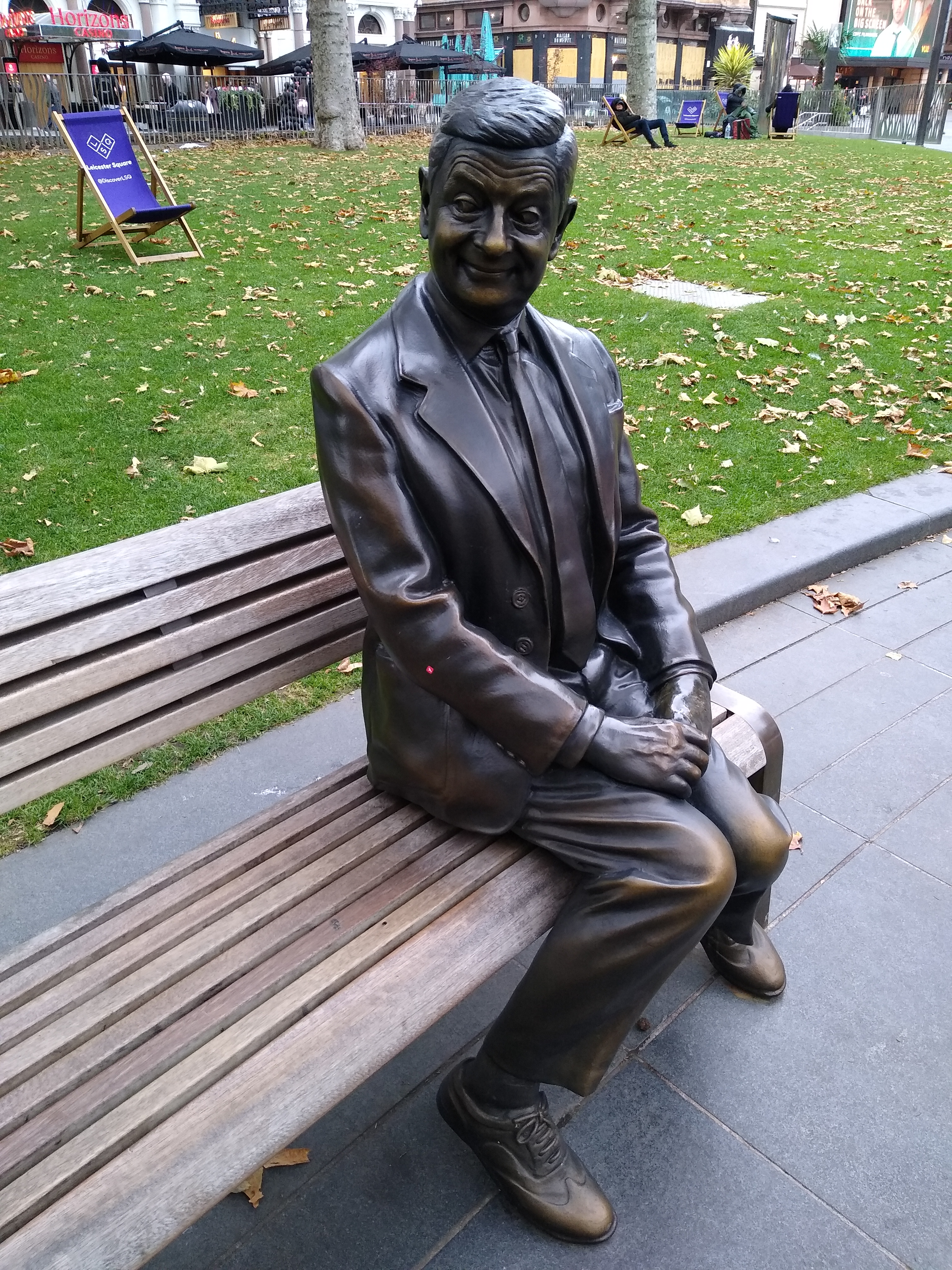
Mr. Bean statue in the square as part of the Scenes in the Square sculpture trail.

Due to the Leicester Square's long association with cinema, a film-themed sculpture trail entitled Scenes in the Square was installed. In February 2020, eight sculptures were installed which depict characters from the last 100 years of cinema including Laurel and Hardy, Mary Poppins, Batman, Bugs Bunny, Don Lockwood portrayed by Gene Kelly, Paddington Bear, Mr. Bean, and Wonder Woman. In September 2020, a statue of Harry Potter riding a Nimbus 2000 was installed, becoming the ninth statue in the exhibition. In June 2021, a statue of the Iron Throne from HBO TV series Game of Thrones was unveiled to mark 10 years since the release of the first episode.

=== Other attractions ===
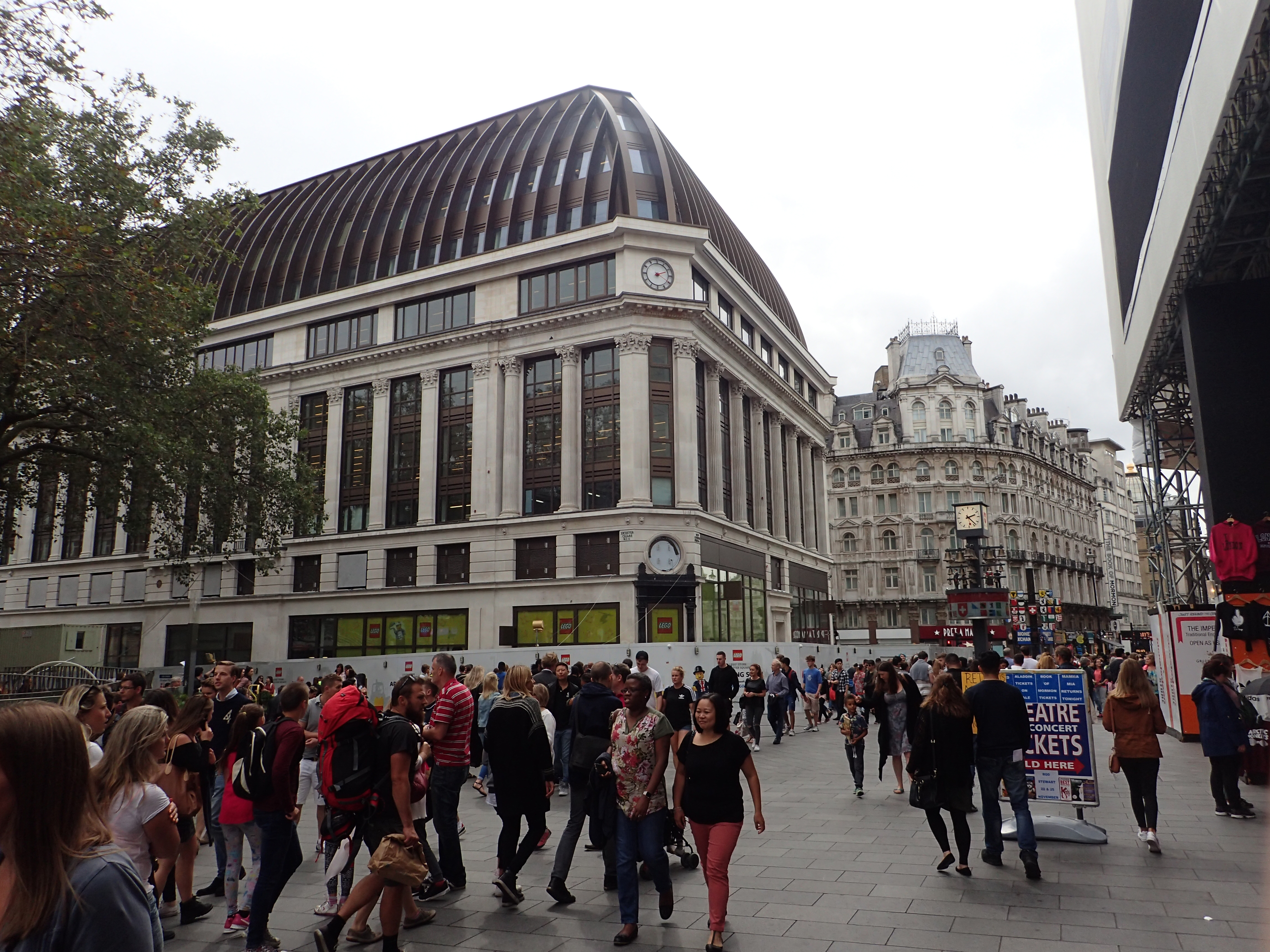
Leicester Square looking north-west towards Swiss Court. The Lego store is visible to the left.

Leicester Square is one of several places in the West End that puts on events relating to the Chinese New Year. The celebrations are organised by the London Chinatown Chinese Association and held on the first Sunday during the new year period. Events include music, acrobatics and dancing. In 2015, the celebrations attracted more than 1,000 participants, becoming the largest of their kind in the UK. These included lion dances, a show of the Cultures of China and a drum show. A parade ran nearby through Charing Cross Road and Shaftesbury Avenue.

The Royal Dental Hospital and school was based at 40–41 from 1874 to 1901 and at 31–36 from 1901 to 1985, when the building was redeveloped as the Hampshire Hotel.

The School of English operated on Leicester Square from 1992 until its closure in 2015. It taught over 25,000 students during its years of operation.

To the west of the square was the location for the Swiss Centre from 1966 to 2008. The area is now named Swiss Court and still features a Swiss glockenspiel clock. M&M's World is now on the former site of the Swiss Centre.

The world's largest Lego store opened at 3 Swiss Court in November 2016. The opening was marked by unveiling a 6-metre (20 ft) high model of Big Ben made out of 200,000 Lego bricks.

In 2022, Burger King announced it would open its first meat-free restaurant in Leicester Square. The initiative operated from 14 March to 10 April, before returning to its initial menu.

=== Infrastructure ===
The main electrical substation for the West End is beneath the square. The electrical cables to the substation are in a large tunnel ending at Leicester Square, and originating in Wimbledon, at Plough Lane, behind the former Wimbledon F.C. football ground, before which the cables are above ground.

== Cultural references ==
In 1726, anatomist Nathaniel St André claimed to have delivered rabbits from Mary Toft, a woman who lived at No. 27 Leicester Square. The event was widely reported around London, attracting interest from King George I and Royal Society president Hans Sloane. Shortly afterwards, the woman was caught trying to buy a rabbit in secret, and the incident was uncovered as a hoax.

Leicester Square is commemorated in the lyrics of the music hall song "It's a Long Way to Tipperary" along with nearby Piccadilly, which became popular with soldiers during World War I. During the war, British inmates of Ruhleben Prisoner of War camp mentioned the square in a song: "Shout this chorus all you can. We want the people there, to hear in Leicester Square, That we're the boys that never get downhearted." It is mentioned in the lyrics of several rock & pop band tracks, including "Jeffrey Goes To Leicester Square" on Jethro Tull's album Stand Up (1969), "Emit Remmus" on the album Californication by the Red Hot Chili Peppers (1999), "He's on the Phone" (1995) by Saint Etienne and "Leicester Square" on Rancid's Life Won't Wait (1998). A verse in "Something About England" on the Clash's 1980 album Sandinista! refers back to "It's a Long Way to Tipperary", including a reference to Leicester Square.

Leicester Square is one of a group of three on the British Monopoly board along with Coventry Street and Piccadilly. The board was set out by designers Victor Watson and Marge Phillips in the order of entertainment on a Saturday night: film at Leicester Square, meal in Coventry Street and hotel on Piccadilly.

== Pronunciation ==
The word Leicester features the ending -cester which is with rare exceptions spoken as a simplified pronunciation, so is counterintuitive, a quirk of British English. A report by Premier Inn said that Leicester Square was the British place name most mispronounced by tourists, usually as "/laɪˈtʃɛstər/" ("Lie-chester") Square.

== See also ==
- List of eponymous roads in London
- 1 Leicester Square
- Swiss Centre, London
- Scenes in the Square
