= Hashim U. Ahmed =

British Medical Researcher

- Born: Hashim Uddin Ahmed
- Citizenship: United Kingdom
- Scientific career
- Fields: Urology, Urological Oncology

Hashim U. Ahmed is a British surgeon, medical researcher and author of publications in the field of prostate cancer diagnostics and treatment; his research has contributed to changes in the way men with suspected prostate cancer and men with prostate enlargement are diagnosed and treated. He is Professor and Chair of Urology at Imperial College Healthcare NHS Trust and Consultant Urological Surgeon at both Charing Cross Hospital and BUPA Cromwell Hospital.

== Education ==
He studied medicine at Oxford University, graduating with a BA (Hons) in Physiology in 1998 and completing his medical degree (BM, BCh) in 2001 and has been registered with the GMC since 2001. He completed a Postgraduate Diploma in Clinical Trials at the London School of Hygiene and Tropical Medicine in 2010 and a PhD at University College London in 2013, entitled “The Role of Focal Therapy in the Treatment of Prostate Cancer”.

== Clinical career ==
Professor Ahmed currently divides his time between clinical practice and research, practicing at Charing Cross Hospital and BUPA Cromwell Hospital. As a forerunner in the field of prostate conditions, he is one of the few surgeons offering HIFU (High-intensity focused ultrasound) and cryotherapy for prostate cancer as well as Rezüm water vapor thermal therapy (also known as Prostate steam treatment) for patients diagnosed with prostate enlargement in the UK, with minimal side effects.

=== Research ===
Professor Ahmed's research interests lie in advancing diagnostics and treatment of prostate cancer and benign prostate enlargement, to improve life expectancy and quality of life for prostate cancer patients. His research has contributed to the implementation of new diagnostic techniques such as advanced imaging, tissue biomarkers and biopsy techniques, to accurately locate cancerous tissue, improve diagnostic accuracy and inform treatment options. As a direct result of his work, the NHS is piloting a Rapid Access to Prostate Imaging and Diagnosis (RAPID) prostate pathway in which patients receive multi-parametric MRI (mp-MRI) scans prior to biopsy. Ahmed has also worked on innovative, non-invasive treatment techniques that target cancer cells whilst preserving healthy tissue and function, thus leading to fewer side-effects; these treatments include focal high intensity focused ultrasound (HIFU), cryotherapy, radiofrequency ablation, injectable toxins, magnetic thermo-ablation and partial ablation rather than full prostate removal.

== Select publications ==
- Ahmed, Hashim U., Ahmed El-Shater Bosaily, Louise C. Brown, Rhian Gabe, Richard Kaplan, Mahesh K. Parmar, Yolanda Collaco-Moraes et al. "Diagnostic accuracy of multi-parametric MRI and TRUS biopsy in prostate cancer (PROMIS): a paired validating confirmatory study." The Lancet 389, no. 10071 (2017): 815–822.
- Loeb, Stacy, Annelies Vellekoop, Hashim U. Ahmed, James Catto, Mark Emberton, Robert Nam, Derek J. Rosario, Vincenzo Scattoni, and Yair Lotan. "Systematic review of complications of prostate biopsy." European urology 64, no. 6 (2013): 876–892.
- Dickinson, Louise, Hashim U. Ahmed, Clare Allen, Jelle O. Barentsz, Brendan Carey, Jurgen J. Futterer, Stijn W. Heijmink et al. "Magnetic resonance imaging for the detection, localisation, and characterisation of prostate cancer: recommendations from a European consensus meeting." European urology 59, no. 4 (2011): 477–494.
- Ahmed, Hashim U., Richard G. Hindley, Louise Dickinson, Alex Freeman, Alex P. Kirkham, Mahua Sahu, Rebecca Scott, Clare Allen, Jan Van der Meulen, and Mark Emberton. "Focal therapy for localised unifocal and multifocal prostate cancer: a prospective development study." The lancet oncology 13, no. 6 (2012): 622–632.
