= Shrewsbury Market Hall =

Indoor Market

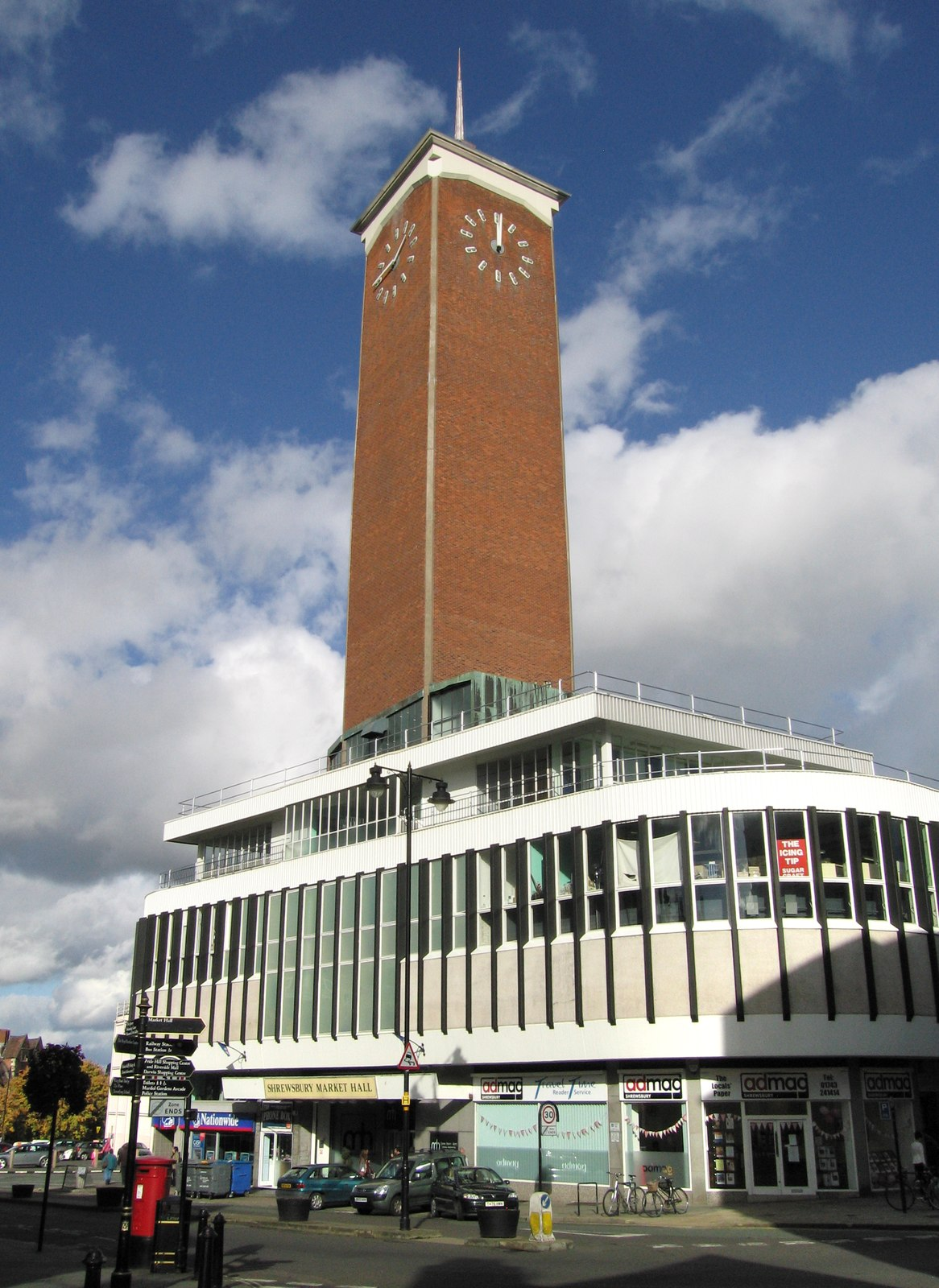
- Exterior, as seen from St Johns Hill.

General information
- Location: Shrewsbury, Shropshire
- Address: Shrewsbury Market Hall, Claremont St, Shrewsbury, SY1 1HQ
- Coordinates: 52.707642°N 2.756487°W
- Opened: 16 September 1965
- Cost: £1,000,000
- Height: 77.8 m / 255 ft

Technical details
- Floor count: 4
- Floor area: 74,000sq ft

Design and construction
- Architect(s): David Aberdeen
- Developer: Second Covent Garden Property Company Ltd

Website
- https://www.shrewsburymarkethall.co.uk/

Shrewsbury Market Hall is an indoor market in Shrewsbury, England. Opened in 1965, the building, designed by architect David Aberdeen, replaced a Victorian market hall. The market has been voted "Britain’s Favourite Market" in 2018, 2023, 2024 and 2025.

Shrewsbury Market Hall hosts just over 70 independent businesses, including grocers, restaurants, cafes, and butchers. As of 2024, the market is jointly managed by Shropshire Council and Shrewsbury Town Council, the first responsible for the permanent stalls and retail units, along with the overall management of the building, and the latter managing the canopied stalls inside the market.

== History ==
=== The New Corn Exchange and Market ===
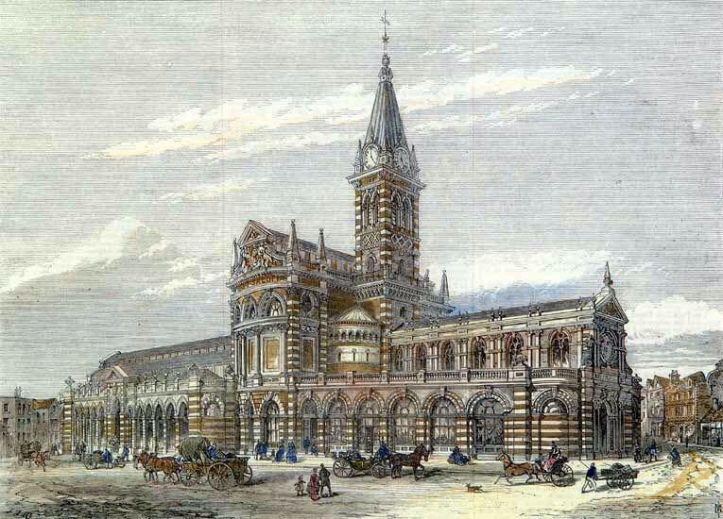
An illustration of The New Corn Exchange and Market, 1869, where today's market currently stands. Viewed from Mardol Head.

Prior to the mid-19th century, many British towns and cities included market houses, which would serve different functions across multiple floors. However, from the mid-19th century, many such towns and cities began to split these functions into separate buildings, including court houses, town halls, covered markets, and/or corn exchanges.

In Shrewsbury, the location for The New Corn Exchange and Market was argued for 15 years, largely between either a Pride Hill site or a Mardol site. After the Mardol site was selected, some 60 to 70 buildings were demolished, including various Georgian timber-framed buildings and a hotel.

On 29 September 1869, The New Corn Exchange and Market was opened. The building measured 313 feet in length and was topped by a 150 foot tall tower with four clock faces and a spire. Designed by Robert Griffiths, it was in an Italianate style, with bricks of white, blue, and black, and was built at a cost of nearly £70,000. Initially, the basement held the fish market and ice house, although the fish market was later moved upstairs. The main entrance to the ground floor was on the Mardol side, which included butchers and a shopping arcade, and on the Bellstone end, apple and butter markets were located in the general hall. The first floor included a billiards hall.

=== Shrewsbury Market Hall ===
==== Construction ====
The New Corn Exchange and Market was demolished in the early 1960s, along with every other Victorian market hall in Shropshire, except those in Newport and Bridgnorth. Little refrigeration and a lack of modern hygiene requirements were reasons for its replacement. It was regarded as "no longer fit for purpose" and "dirty and dingy" by newspapers at the time.

Developed by the Second Covent Garden Property Company Ltd, and designed by the architect David Aberdeen, the construction then took place between two parts, with the Mardol end, named Mardol House, being built first so that trading could continue there while the rest of the building was completed. On 28 June 1963, during construction on the Bellstone end, a collapse of a cellar floor trapped several workers, and led to one being killed and four others injured. The 200 ft clock tower took 48,000 bricks and required a 100 tonne crane with a 240-foot jib to construct. The 37 foot high aluminium finial was also added, and a topping off ceremony was held on 7 April 1965. Original plans included a rooftop restaurant and garden, although this was never carried out.

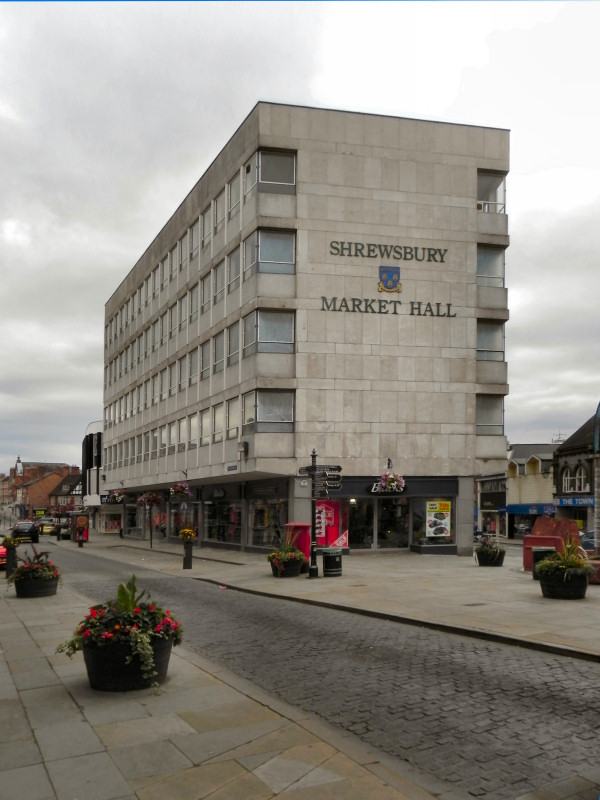
Mardol house exterior, as seen from Mardol Head.

==== Opening ====
Although the market had been trading since 21 November 1964, it was officially opened on 16 September 1965, by the Lord Lieutenant of Shropshire, 2nd Viscount Bridgeman, after construction lasting 2 years. In attendance were 120 special guests along with a crowd of townspeople.

==== Reception ====
At the time, the new building received positive responses in media. It was described as "a good example of modern architecture" by The Pevsner Architectural Guide, and a local newspaper also stated that "it replaces that Victorian monstrosity put up less than 100 years ago". In a headline, the Shrewsbury Chronicle wrote "Market Is Big Asset To Town", and described it as "the newest and most modern building in the county". Some opposed the demolition of the Victorian market, and had predicted the new building would be "A white elephant".

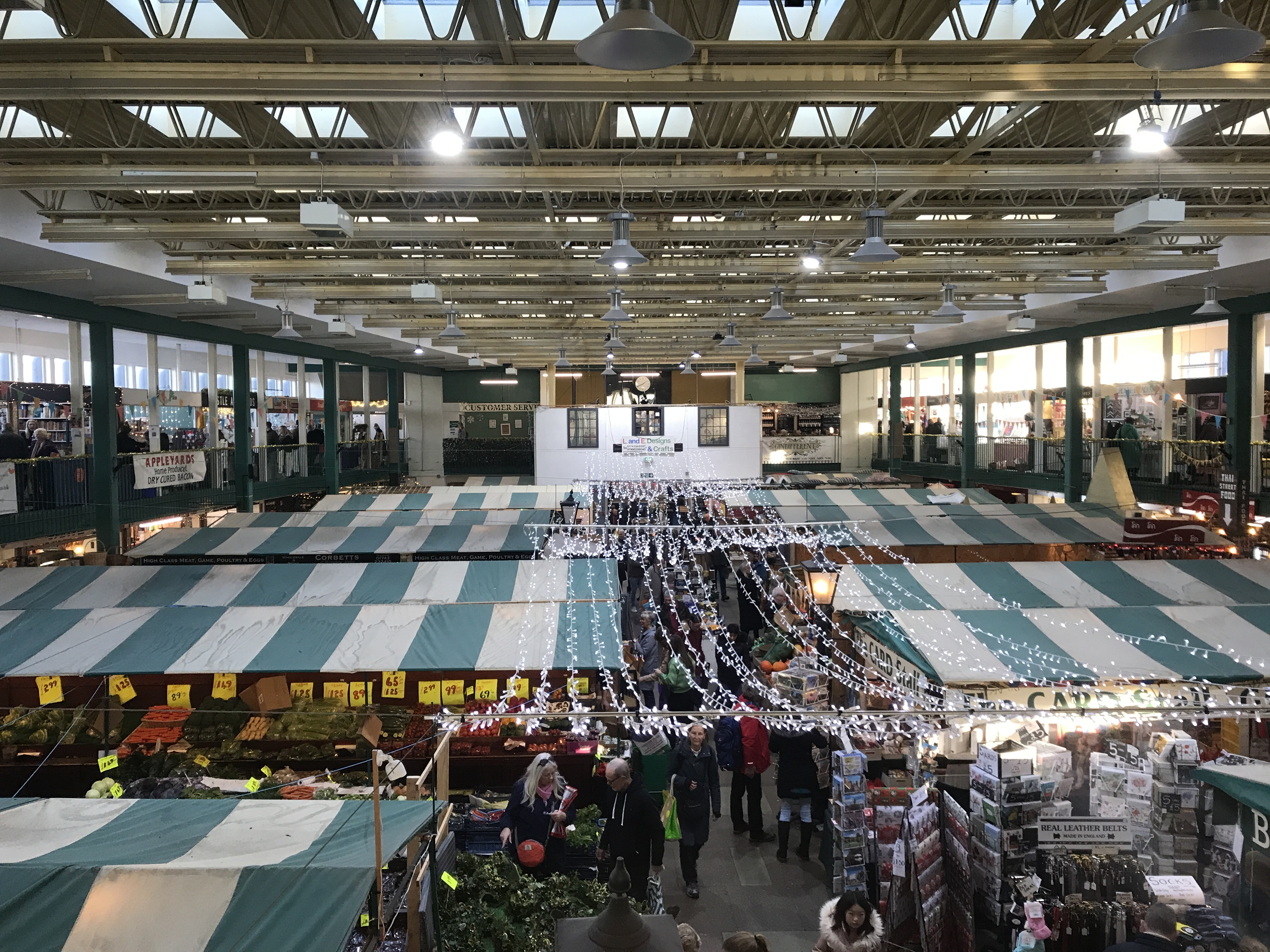
The Market Interior
