= Jolly Farmer =

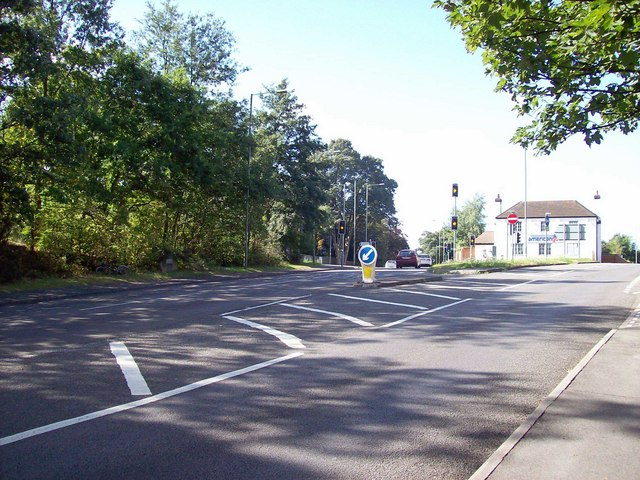
- View of the pub from London Road

- Location within Surrey

General information
- Type: Public house
- Location: Junction of A30 and A325; Bagshot Heath, Surrey
- Coordinates: 51°20′56″N 0°42′48″W
- Construction started: c. 1690 (first building); 1879 (current building)
- Closed: 1996; Now the American Golf store

The Jolly Farmer, formerly the Golden Farmer, is a former pub and roundabout on the boundary between Camberley and Bagshot in Surrey, England. The pub derives its name from a gold-robbing farmer, William Davies (or Davis) who spent years plundering various sections of the country's main south-west turnpike road including this area before being hanged in 1689 at this location.

== Junction ==
The junction was a fork with the London to Land's End turnpike road (now the A30 London Road), and the London to Portsmouth turnpike (now the A325 Portsmouth Road). The two main roads are mentioned in John Ogilby's Britannia, published in 1675, with the Land's End road described as "in general a very good Road with suitable Entertainment" and the Portsmouth Road as "A very good Road to Southampton, and thence to Salisbury indifferent" (the route to Southampton being roughly the A325 and part of what is now the A31). Until the establishment of Camberley in 1860, it crossed remote unpopulated heathland. In the stagecoach era, it was busy with traffic, and notorious for the poor quality of road and proliferation of highwaymen.

The junction has been an important landmark and mentioned in early motoring itineraries. It was originally a simple fork in the road and was converted into the current roundabout layout in 1960.

=== Basing Stone ===
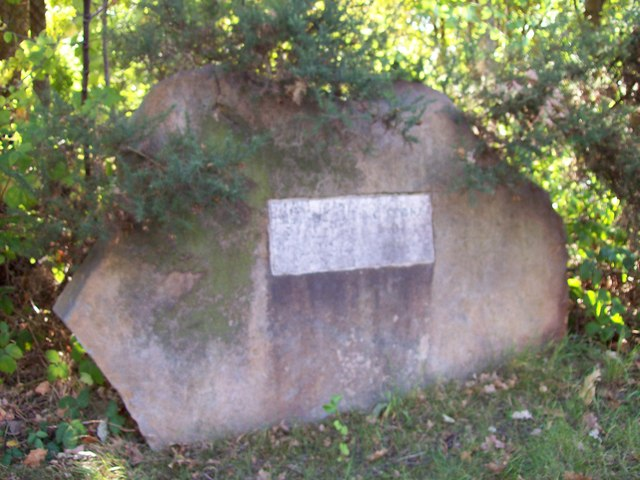
The Basing Stone.

The junction is marked by the 'Basing Stone' or 'Basingstone'. The current stone replaces the original, lost during roadworks in the 1950s, and carries the inscription "Site of the Basing Stone and the Legend of the White Hart".

== William Davies ==
The highwayman William Davies (also recorded as "Davis") was born in Wrexham, Wales, before moving to Sodbury, Gloucestershire where he married and had 18 children. He targeted heaths across England from Putney near London to Cornwall for 40 years in the 17th century, taking significant gold from his victims. He plied the uninhabited main road across Bagshot/Frimley Heath. His identity was discovered since he was a Sodbury farmer bearing 18 children with his wife who paid "any considerable sum in gold". Davies was hung in chains on Bagshot Heath in December 1689.

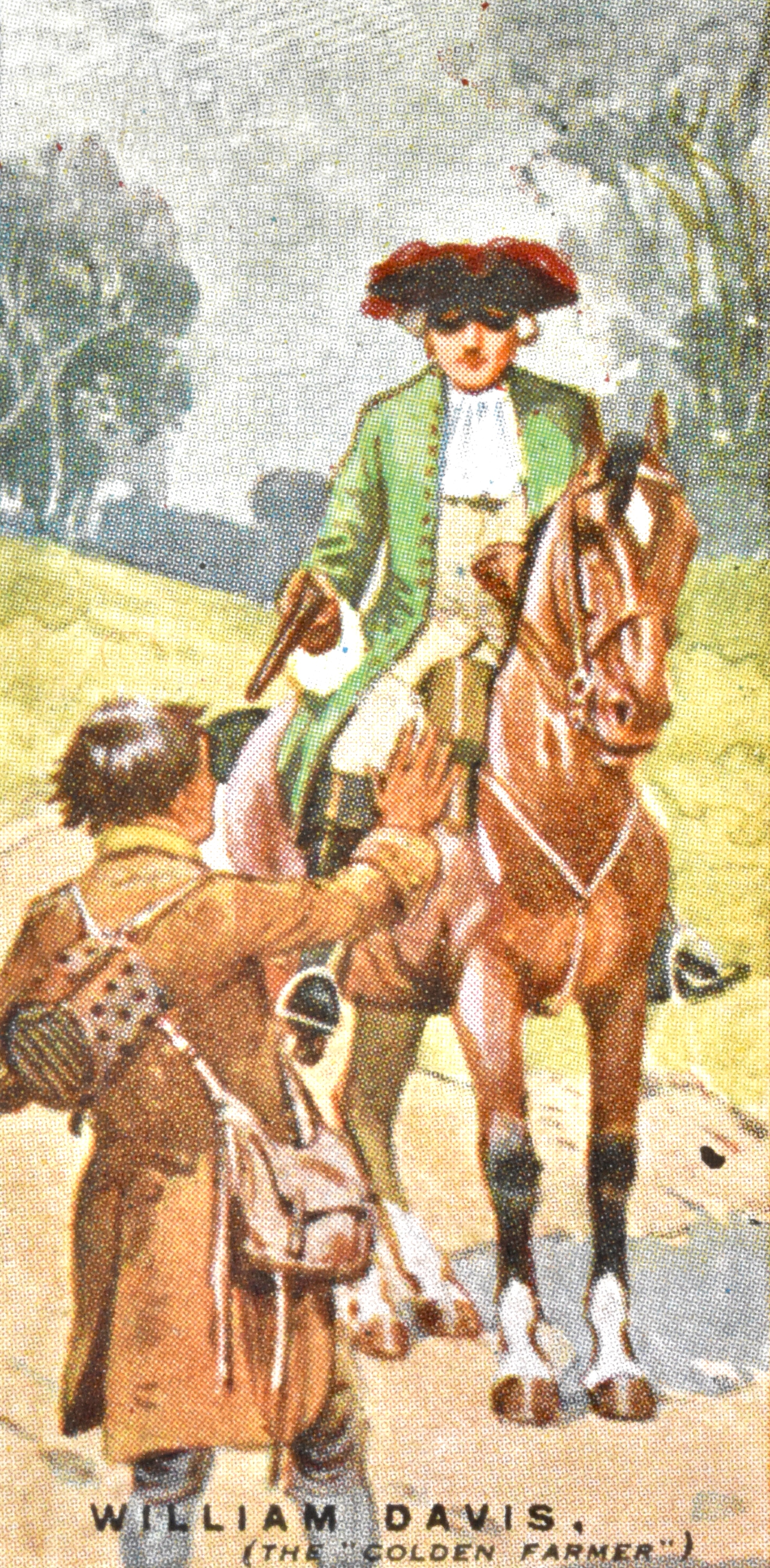
A cigarette card by W.D. & H.O. Wills depicting the notorious Golden Farmer.

According to oral history Davies was hanged near the location of the pub, at the junction of London Road and Gibbett Lane. According to historian Jacqueline Simpson, this included speculation that he was hanged alive and starved to death, though this practice had been abolished by Elizabeth I a century earlier for being too barbaric.

== Pub ==
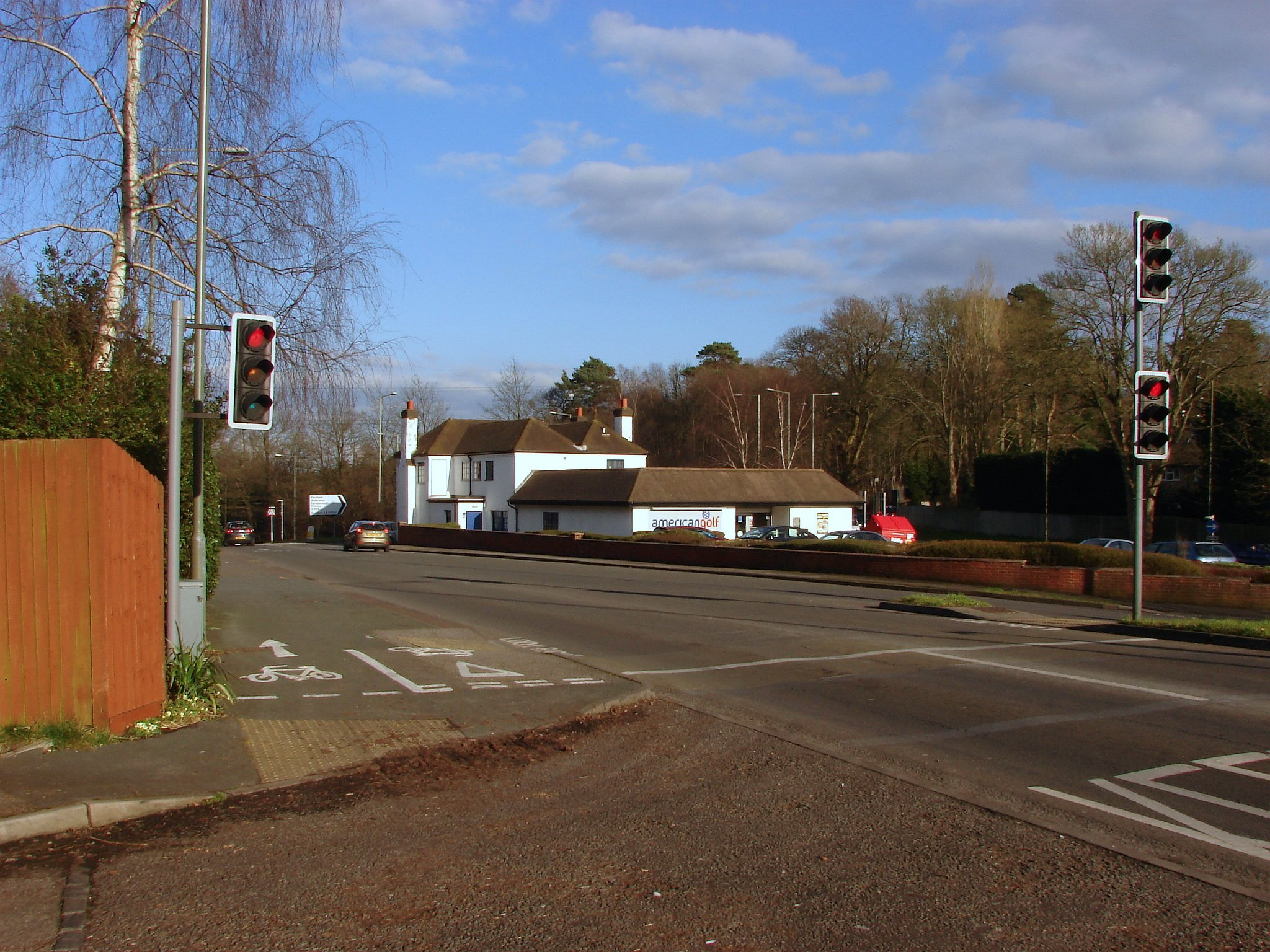
View of the former pub from the A30 eastbound

The original building was to the north of the London Road, and operated from the late 17th century as the Golden Farmer. It appeared under that name on early Ordnance Survey maps in the 19th century. The name "Golden Farmer" was originally associated with John Bennet, but became associated with Davies after being mentioned as such in Alexander Smith's The History of the Lives of the most Noted Highwaymen, published in 1714.

The inn moved to its current location in the 1820s and the name was changed to the "Jolly Farmer" in 1823. During the 19th century, the pub was a rendezvous point for hunting around Bagshot Heath.

H. E. Malden wrote the Victoria County History in 1911, finding little of economic productivity or architecture in Bagshot to record other than its coaching inns, stating "Thirty coaches a day passed through, and there were many inns, since closed...The later history is full of the exploits of highwaymen, who found the wild country hereabouts specially favourable for their purposes".

In 1996, the pub closed and became a Mongolian barbecue. After this also closed, Burger King offered to buy the building, but their offer was rejected by Surrey Heath council after parents were concerned children from the nearby secondary school would try to cross the junction to reach the premises. Since 2003, the building has been used as an American Golf store.
