= Joan Bracey =

English highwaywoman

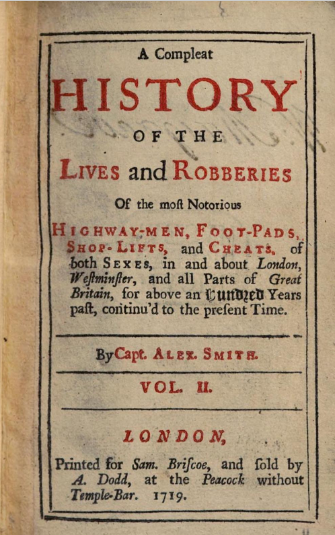
- original source by Capt. Alex Smith
- Born: Joan Phillips c.1656 prob. Northamptonshire
- Died: Maybe 15 April 1685; Nottingham
- Known for: being a highwaywoman
- Partner: Edward Bracey

Joan Bracey born Joan Phillips (c.1656 – maybe 15 April 1685) was an English highwaywoman described in a book in 1715. All the stories of her life seem to come from this one source and no supporting evidence of her existence has been found. For this reason her existence is at times doubted.

== Life ==
Bracey's family were well off and Northamptonshire farmers and their family name was Phillips. Facts are few, but it is said that she met Edward Bracey when she was 24. He was already a criminal and he had hoped to gain money by marrying her. The marriage never took place, but they robbed her father, and they became partners. They committed highway robberies together which was a capital crime.

They made enough money to open an inn at Bristol, and she was known for swindling men who thought they were in for a night of passion. The inn became notorious, and they returned to their previous occupation.

In 1685, she was caught while they were conducting a robbery. Edward got away, but Joan was put on trial and sentenced to be hanged. One source says that she died on 15 April outside Nottingham. All the stories of her life seem to come from one source and no supporting evidence has been found.
