= Captain Alexander Smith =

Compiler of volumes of biographies

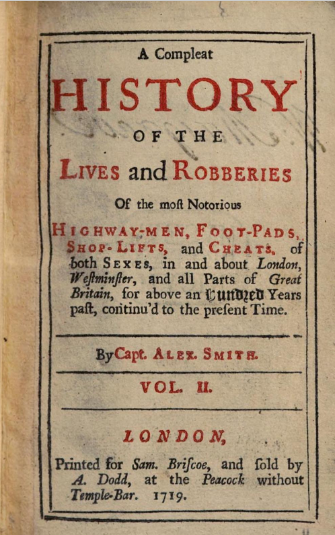
A Compleat history of the lives and robberies of the most notorious highwaymen...

Captain Alexander Smith (fl. 1714–1726) was a compiler of volumes of biographies. Presumed to be a nom de plume, but the details of the real authors are unknown.

== Biography ==
"Captain Alex. Smith" is known only for his/her compilations created during the reign of George I, which suggest that he was better known as a frequenter of police-courts and taverns than in military circles. It is not improbable that his industry was stimulated by the success obtained by Theophilus Lucas from his Lives of the Gamesters, published in 1714. The works issued in Captain Alexander Smith's name were:

A Complete History of the Lives and Robberies of the most notorious Highwaymen, Footpads, Shoplifts, and Cheats of both Sexes in and about London and Westminster (2nd edit. London, 1714, 12mo, supplementary volume, 1720, 12mo; another edit., 2 vols. 1719, 12mo; 1719–20, 3 vols. 12mo); this curious work, which commands a high price, commences with a humorous account of Sir John Falstaff, and gives details, frequently no less mythical, about the Golden Farmer, Nevison, Duval, Moll Cutpurse, and a score of other notorious persons. The life of the highwaywoman Joan Bracey appears to come from this one source.

The supplement of 1720 includes a "Thieves' Grammar".

- Secret History of the Lives of the most celebrated Beauties, Ladies of Quality, and Jilts, from Fair Rosamond down to this Time, London, 1715, 2 vols. 12mo.
- Court of Venus, or Cupid restored to Sight, London, 1716, 2 vols. 12mo.
- Thieves' New Canting Dictionary of the Words, Proverbs, Terms, and Phrases used in the Language of Thieves, London, 1719, 12mo.
- The Comical and Tragical History of the Lives and Adventures of the most noted Bayliffs in and about London and Westminster … discovering their stratagems and tricks, wherein the whole Art and Mistery of Bumming is fully exposed, London, 1723, 8vo; 3rd edit. 1723. This shilling brochure had a great sale, mainly on account of the extreme coarseness of the drolleries, which reaches its climax in the account of the indignities inflicted upon a bailiff caught within the liberties of the Mint (this is effectively utilised in the opening chapters of Ainsworth's 'Jack Sheppard').
- Memoirs of the Life and Times of the famous Jonathan Wild, together with the Lives of modern Rogues … that have been executed since his death, London, 1726, 12mo (with cuts).
- Court Intrigue, or an Account of the Secret Memoirs of the British Nobility and others, London, 1730, 12mo.

[Smith's Works in British Museum Library; Lowndes's Bibl. Man. (Bohn), p. 2417; Watt's Bibliotheca Britannica; Allibone's Dict. of Engl. Lit.]
