= Swiss Centre, London =

The Swiss Centre
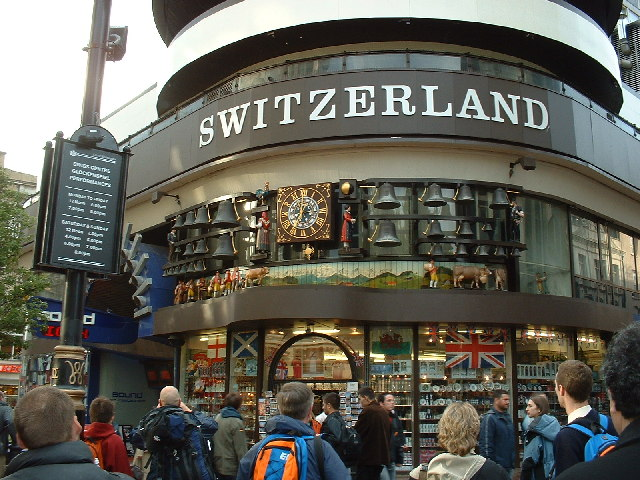
- The Swiss Centre in 2003
- Interactive map of the The Swiss Centre area

General information
- Location: Coventry Street, London
- Coordinates: 51.5106°N 0.1312°W
- Completed: 1966
- Demolished: 2008

Design and construction
- Architect: David du Roi Aberdeen
- Main contractor: John Laing & Son

The Swiss Centre, with its distinctive clock, was a popular tourist attraction on the edge of Coventry Street, London, at its junction with Leicester Square. The 14 storey building was both a showcase for Switzerland and its products, a trade and commercial centre that featured a Swiss bank, tourist office, a chocolate and souvenir shop, a Swissair ticket office, a cafe and several Swiss-themed restaurants which were located in the basement.

It was designed by David Aberdeen and built by John Laing & Son and Token Construction Company Limited between 1963 and 1966, to include a podium above the shops located at street level, and an 11-storey tower block with office floors, residential spaces, a penthouse, a viewing gallery and a plant room.

Over the years the connection with Switzerland faded out: several shops remained vacant, and British souvenir stalls took over the commercial spaces from the late nineties. The clock's chimes were last played on 21 September 2007, and the centre was demolished in 2008.

Two totem columns, one displaying the Helvetic cantons insignia, and the other a large carillon clock composed of 23 bells, were preserved in the western section of the square that was finally renamed Swiss Court, in order to retain an element of Swiss heritage.

The glockenspiel, redesigned and restored by the clockmakers Smith of Derby, was returned in November 2011, three years after the building's demolition.

At the time of the building's demolition, it was intended that a hotel would be constructed on the site. The site (bordered by Lisle Street, Leicester Street, Swiss Court and Wardour Street) was redeveloped and now contains M&M's World in the location on Leicester Square and was opened in June 2011. The W Hotel, with its entrance on Wardour Street, takes up the north part of the site and upper levels.

== Sources ==
- Ritchie, Berry (1997). The Good Builder: The John Laing Story. James & James.
