= Panton Street =

Street in London, England

Coordinates: 51.509438°N 0.131948°W

Panton Street with the Harold Pinter Theatre visible

Panton Street is a short street in London that runs from Haymarket in the west to Leicester Square in the east. It is named after the gambler Thomas Panton who after substantial winnings retired from games of chance and developed the area.

== History and description ==
In 1669, Thomas Panton acquired Shaver's Hall, possibly by dealing with Henry Oxendon who was in an inheritance dispute over the land after the previous owner, Oxendon's father-in-law Robert Baker, had died. Panton began laying out the street on its land in 1671 after successfully petitioning the Privy Council to allow him to develop the land despite a "late proclamation" against building by Charles II. The building work was overseen by Christopher Wren.

On the 9th of June 1803 an intense storm in the area led to eyewitness accounts of an "electric cloud" descending on the street which was said to have caused significant damage to the street as well as an intense sulphurous odour. On the north side of the street previously stood Stone's Chop House, the successor of Stone's Hotel which had been established on the site around 1778 .

In 1881 the Harold Pinter Theatre was built on the street's junction with Oxendon Street. The building is Grade II listed alongside Nos. 5 and 6 of the street, two original houses of the 1670s, and the 1950s designed Clareville House. Notable residents of the street include Dean Swift, Joseph Addison. George Augustus Sala recounts in his autobiography that he got into a fight with the owner of an establishment on the street over the price of champagne which ended in his own nose being broken.

== See also ==
- Panton Square
