= Congress House =

Building in London, England

Coordinates: 51.51744°N 0.1285°W

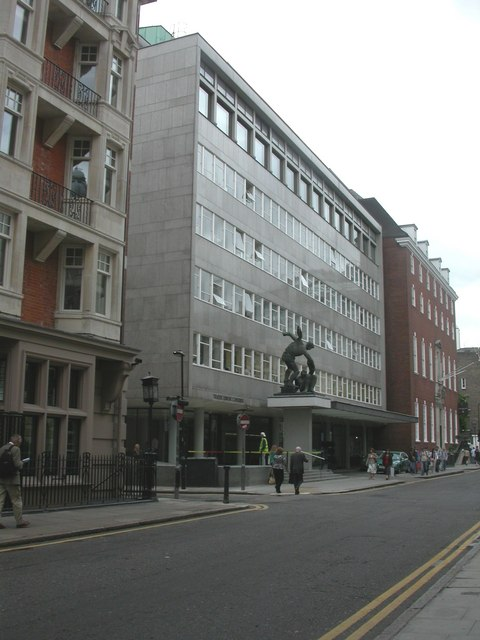
- Congress House
- Interactive map of the Congress House area

General information
- Location: Great Russell Street, Holborn, London WC1B 3LS, England
- Completed: 1958

Design and construction
- Architects: David du Roi Aberdeen

Listed Building – Grade II*
- Official name: Congress House, including forecourt and courtyard sculptures
- Designated: 29 March 1988
- Reference no.: 1113223

Congress House is the headquarters of the Trades Union Congress (TUC), a British organisation that represents most of the UK's trade unions.

In 1948, David du Roi Aberdeen won an architectural competition to design the new TUC headquarters building in Great Russell Street, London. Staff began to move into the offices in 1956. Congress House was officially opened on 27 March 1958 along with the unveiling of a giant pietà-style statue of a woman holding her dead son. Carved in place in the internal courtyard by Jacob Epstein, it was intended as a memorial to the dead trade unionists of both world wars.

The front of the building is dominated by a bronze sculpture by Bernard Meadows representing the spirit of trade unionism with the strong helping the weak. The main facing material of the façade is polished grey Cornish granite.

Congress House was one of the earliest post-war buildings to be listed, at Grade II*, in 1988.

In 2015, an ETFE roof was installed over the internal courtyard which enabled the glass roof of the conference centre below to be reinstated and affords protection to the Epstein statue.

In 2018, an extensive redevelopment of the rear of the building was carried out, creating a new entrance, reception, offices and staff facilities. Known as 'The Rookery', the new development includes a public artwork by German artist Eva Berendes inspired by traditional trade union badges.

== Gallery ==
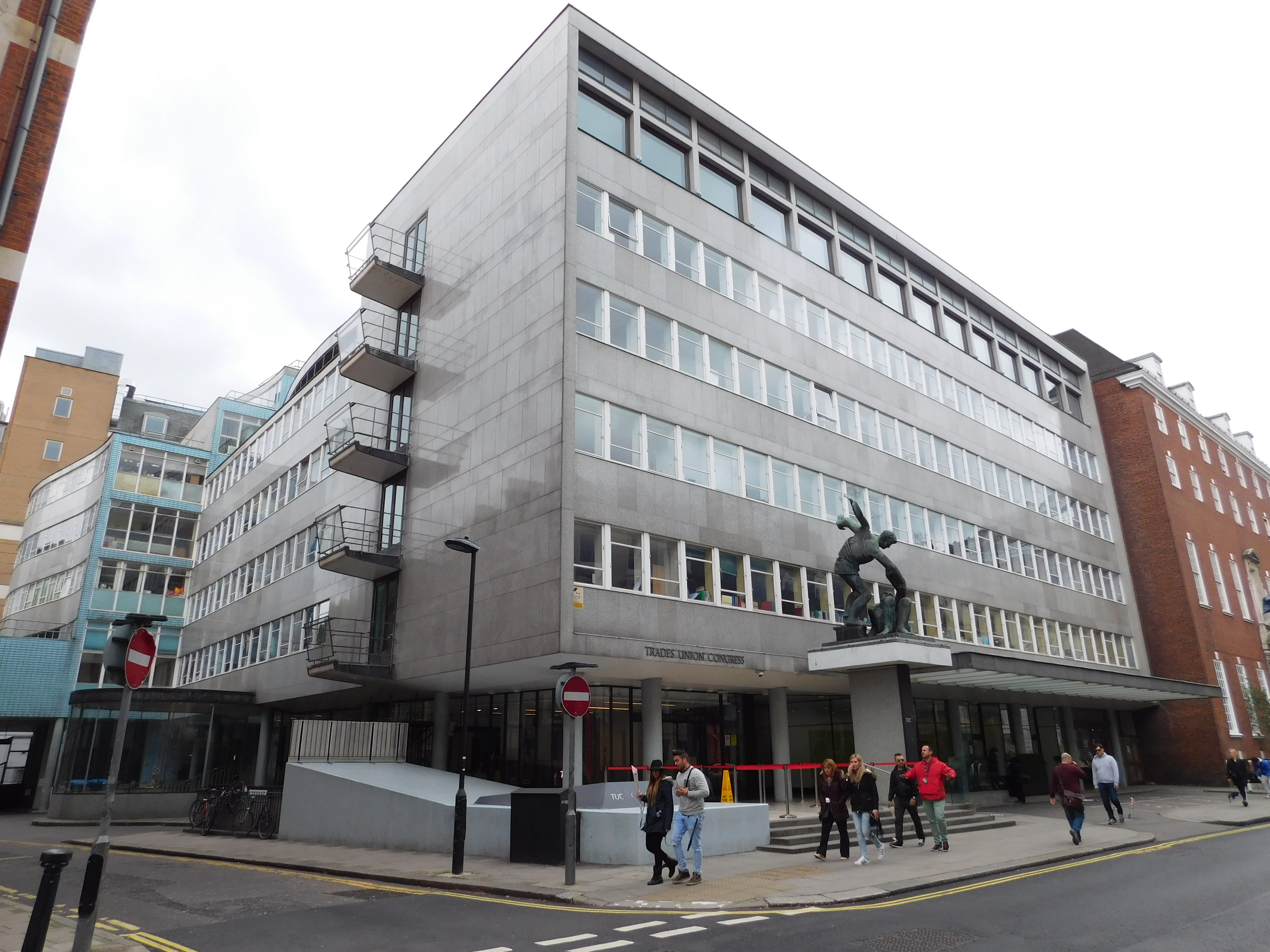
Junction of Great Russell Street and Dyott Street

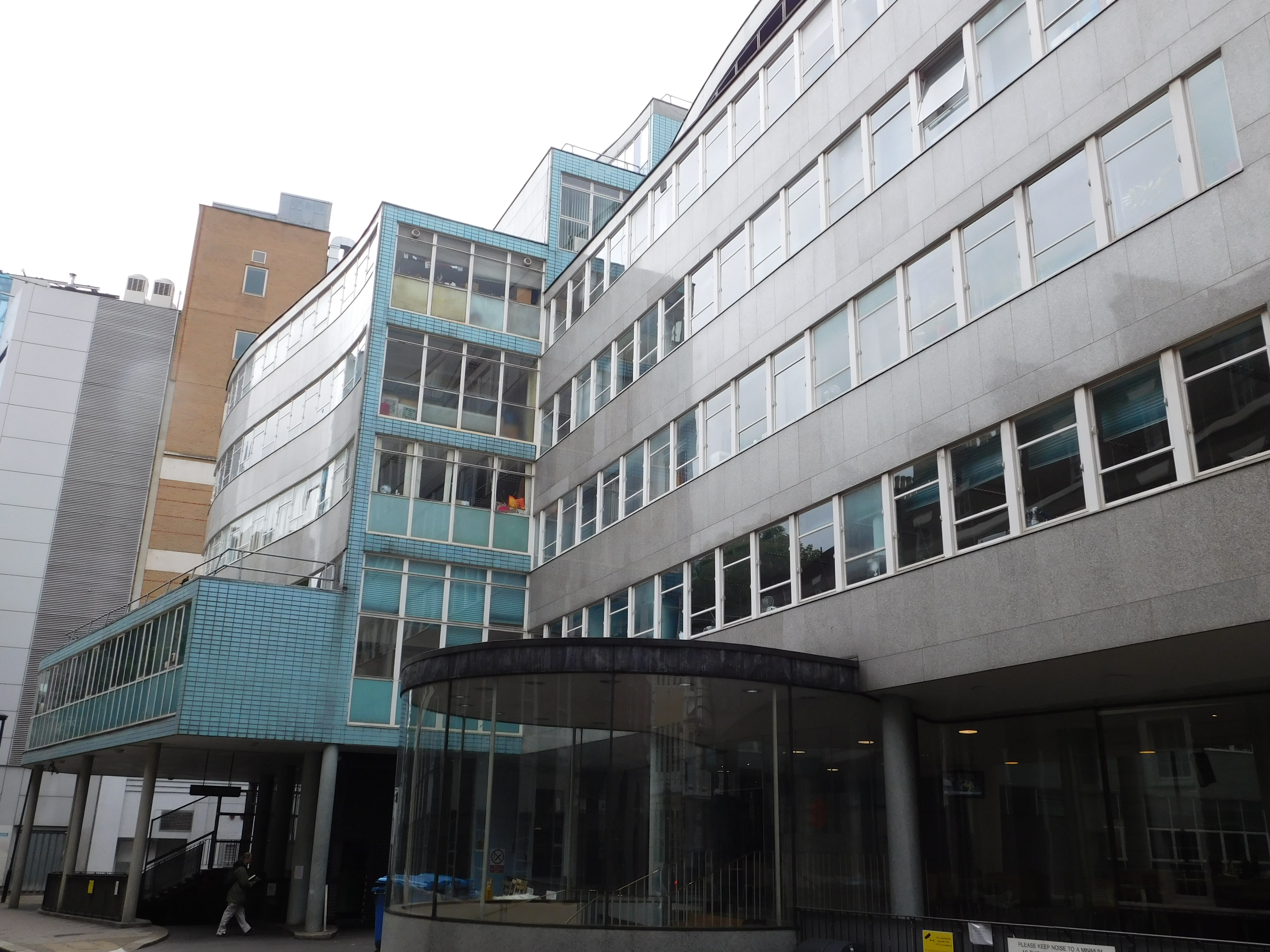
Dyott Street side of Congress House

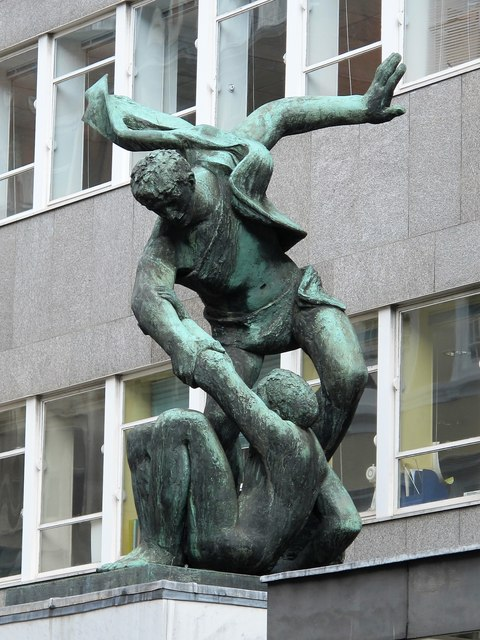
Bernard Meadows' statue 'The Spirit of Brotherhood'

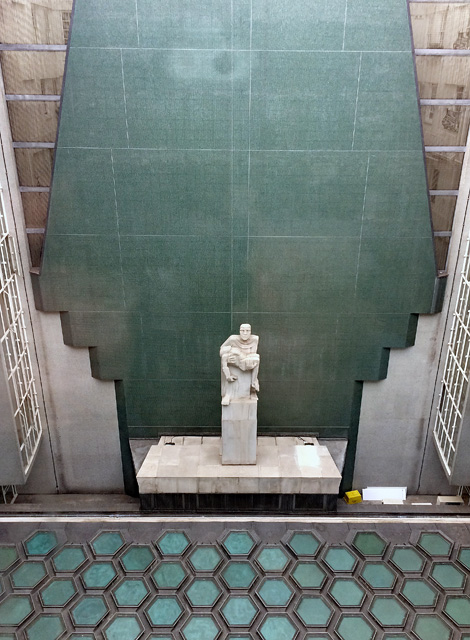
Jacob Epstein's "Pietà" in the courtyard of Congress House

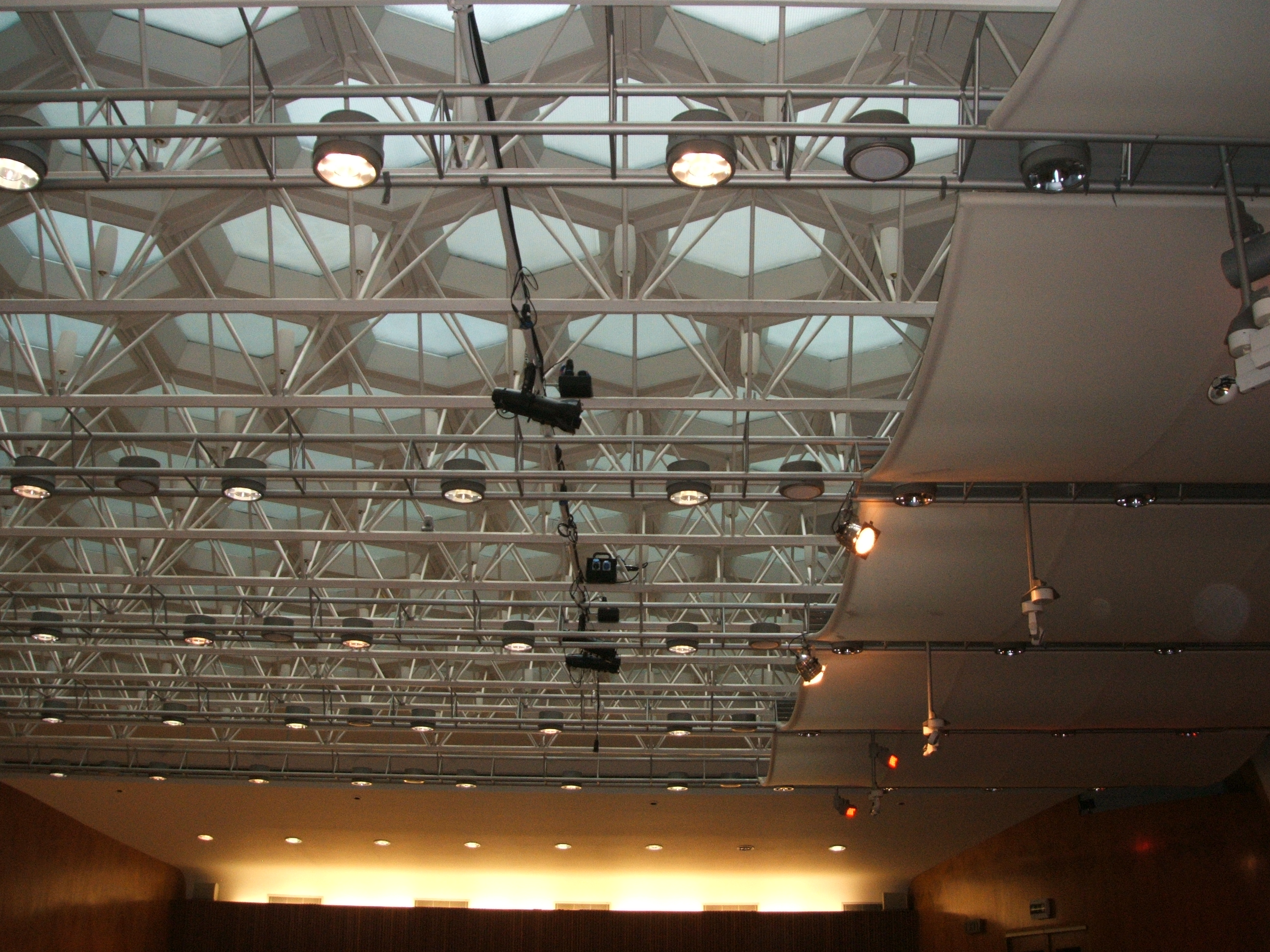
The original space frame ceiling of Congress Hall.
