= Cromwell Hospital =

- Bupa
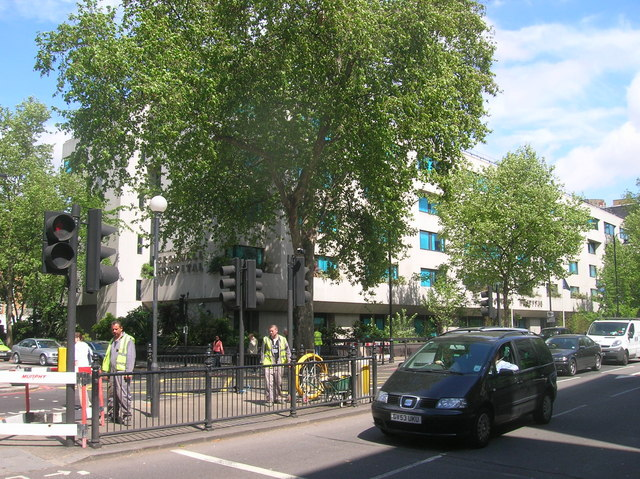
- Cromwell Hospital

- Shown in Kensington and Chelsea

Geography
- Location: London, SW5
- Coordinates: 51.4949°N 0.1914°W

Organisation
- Care system: Private

History
- Founded: 1981; 45 years ago

Links
- Website: www.bupacromwellhospital.com

The Cromwell Hospital is a private sector hospital located in the South Kensington area of London. It is operated by international healthcare company Bupa.

== History ==
The hospital, which was designed by Holder Mathias, was established by Bank of Credit and Commerce International to provide healthcare for the Abu Dhabi royal family in April 1981. The finance for the construction of this purpose-built facility was arranged by Pakistani banker and philanthropist Agha Hasan Abedi.

The hospital was bought by international healthcare company group Bupa in 2008.

== See also ==
- Healthcare in London
- List of hospitals in England
- Hashim U. Ahmed
