= Coventry Street =

London street, within the City of Westminster

Coordinates: 51.5102°N 0.1328°W

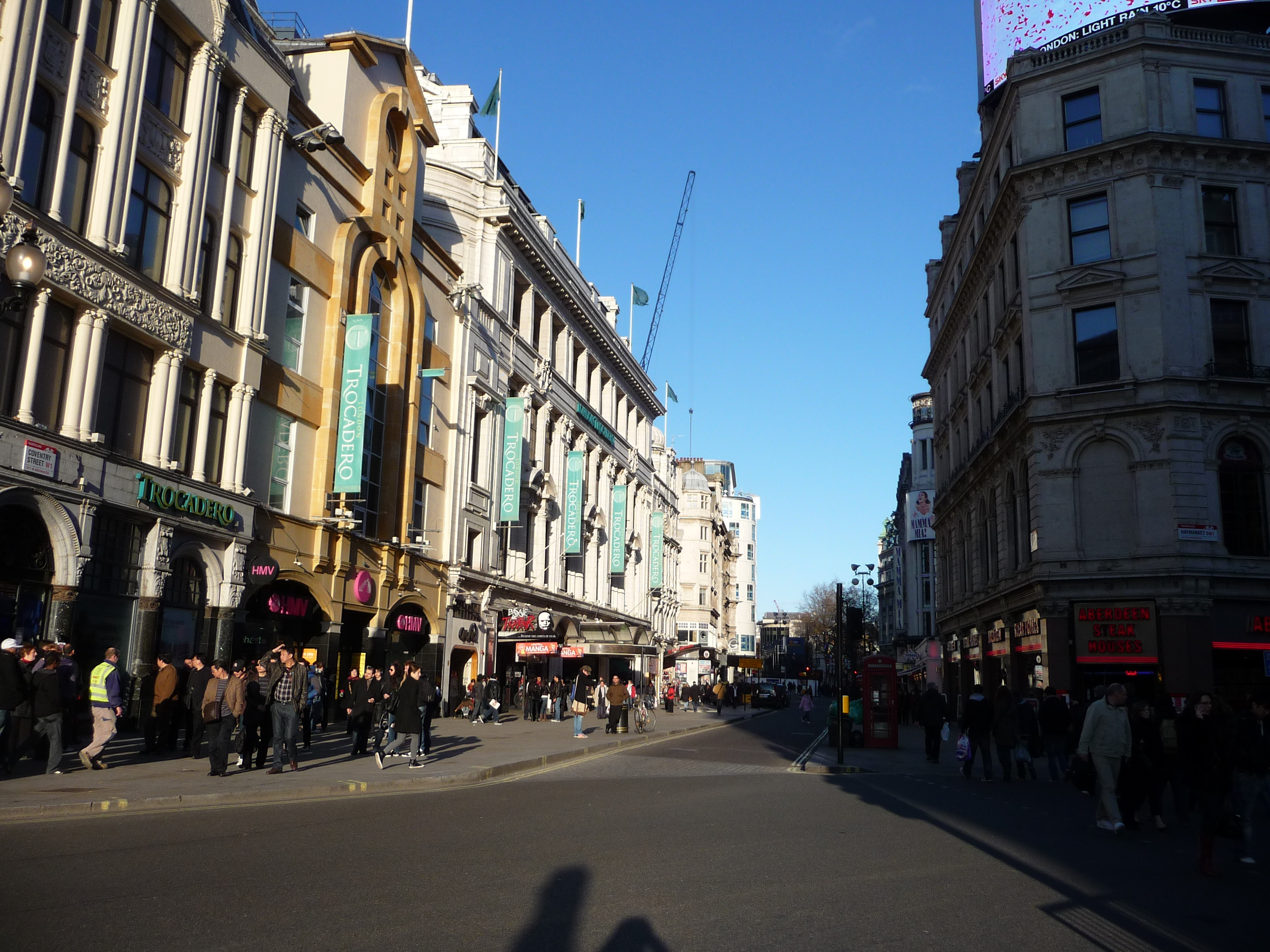
Looking eastwards on Coventry Street towards the Trocadero shopping centre

Coventry Street is a short street in the West End of London, connecting Piccadilly Circus to Leicester Square. Part of the street is a section of the A4, a major road through London. It is named after the politician Henry Coventry, secretary of state to Charles II.

The street was constructed in 1681 for entertainment and retail purposes, and acquired a shady character with numerous gambling houses and a reputation for prostitution. This changed during the late 19th century, with the establishment of several music hall outlets including the London Pavilion, the Prince of Wales Theatre and the Trocadero Music Hall. In the 20th century, it became known for its high-traffic restaurants, including the first J. Lyons and Co. and the first premises of the seafood restaurant Scott's. It was also popular for its nightclubs, and was the original location of the Flamingo Club.

== Geography ==
Coventry Street is one-way for motor traffic, running eastbound. It is around 0.2 miles (350 yd) long and runs east from Piccadilly Circus to Leicester Square via Haymarket and Wardour Street. The nearest tube stations are Piccadilly Circus and Leicester Square (both on the Piccadilly line).

The western section of the road is part of the A4 one-way system between Piccadilly Circus and Trafalgar Square. No buses run along the full length of Coventry Street but there is access to numerous routes from Piccadilly Circus or nearby Charing Cross Road.

== History ==
=== 16th – 18th century ===
There is historical evidence of a road linking Haymarket with Wardour Street in 1585, roughly in the present location of Coventry Street. This pre-dated Leicester Square, and ran as far as St. Martin's Field, stopping short of St. Martin's Lane.

Coventry Street was constructed in 1681 as a thoroughfare between the two places and was named after the secretary of state to Charles II, Henry Coventry. Coventry had previously built a house in this location, and renamed it Coventry House in 1670. The house was described as "a capital messuage with divers outhouses, Gardens, Yards. … capable of being greatly improved." Coventry died in 1686 and the house was demolished four years later, to be replaced by a group of smaller houses. The land to the north of the street was partly owned by Colonel Thomas Panton, and partly by the Earl of St Albans. John Ogilby's 1681 map of London shows Coventry Street built up on both sides.

The street had been designed for commercial and entertainment purposes, rather than a place of residence. For much of the 18th and early 19th century, there were a number of gambling houses along the street, contributing to a shady and downmarket character. The historian J.T.Smith remarked in 1846 that Coventry Street had "a considerable number of gaming-houses in the neighbourhood at the present time, so that the bad character of the place is at least two centuries old, or ever since it was built upon".

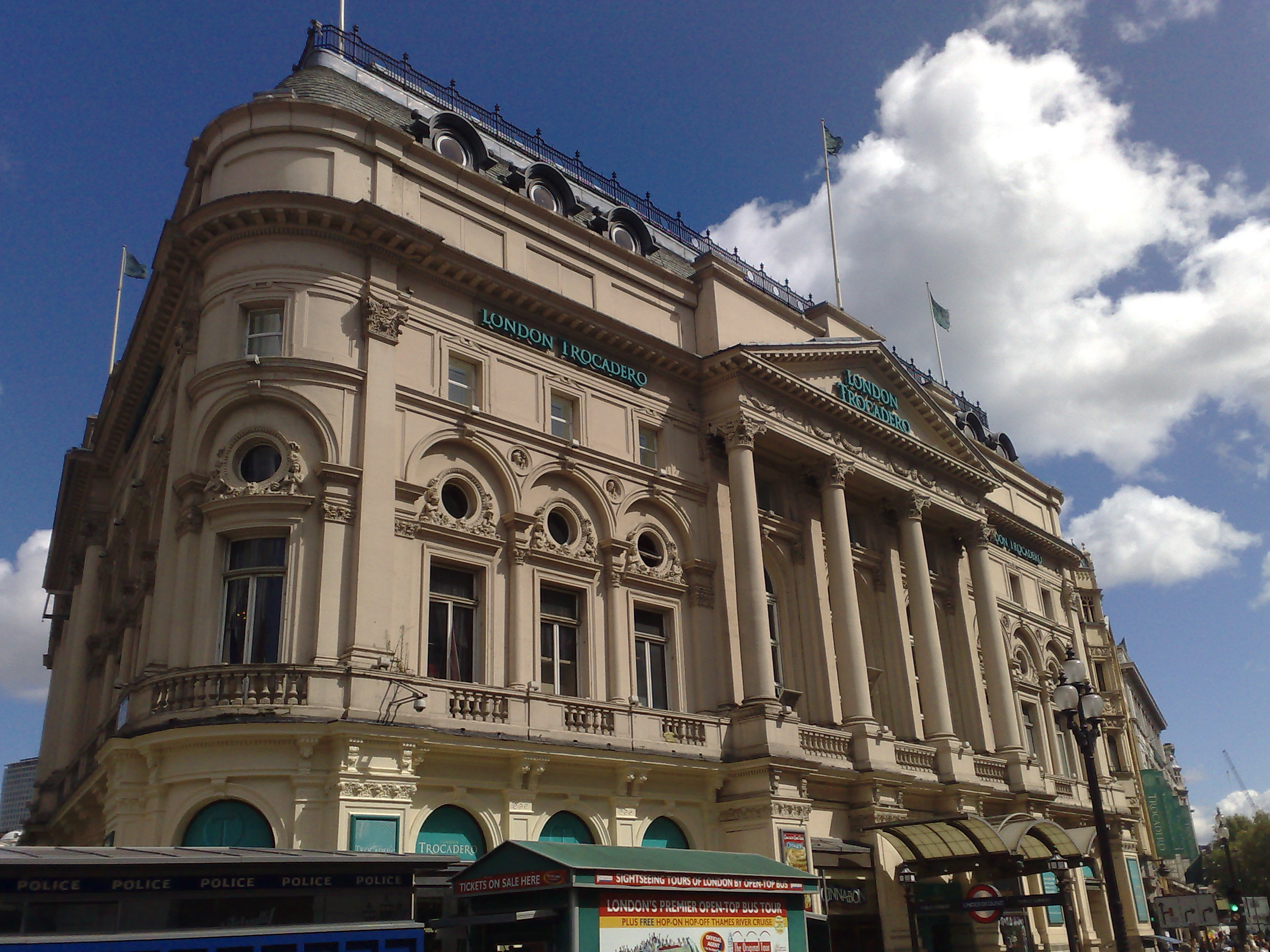
The Trocadero has been an entertainment centre on Coventry Street since 1744. The current facade dates from 1882, when it was a music hall.

The Trocadero sits in the area between Coventry Street, Great Windmill Street and Shaftesbury Avenue, with the main entrance on Coventry Street. The origins of the site can be traced back to 1744, when John Cartwright gave a 99-year lease on this land to Thomas Higginson, in order to construct a real tennis court. Higginson retained ownership of the court until 1761, after which it had a number of owners through to the 19th century. From the 1820s onwards, it was used as a music and exhibition hall. After the lease expired in 1842, ownership passed to John Musgrove, who sublet it to Robert Bignel. Bignel redesigned the premises as a number of assembly rooms called the Argyll Rooms. It acquired a notorious reputation for prostitution, and consequently closed in 1878. It re-opened four years later as the Trocadero Palace, a music hall. A group of shops were established on the site in 1889, and the entire development was sold to J. Lyon's & Co in 1895. Having been part of the Lyons restaurant complex and shops for much of the 20th century, it is now a shopping centre.

Wishart's tobacco makers was established on Coventry Street in 1720. The family business survived through to the following century. The goldsmiths and jewellers Lambert's were established at Nos. 10–12 Coventry Street in 1803.

=== 19th – 21st century ===
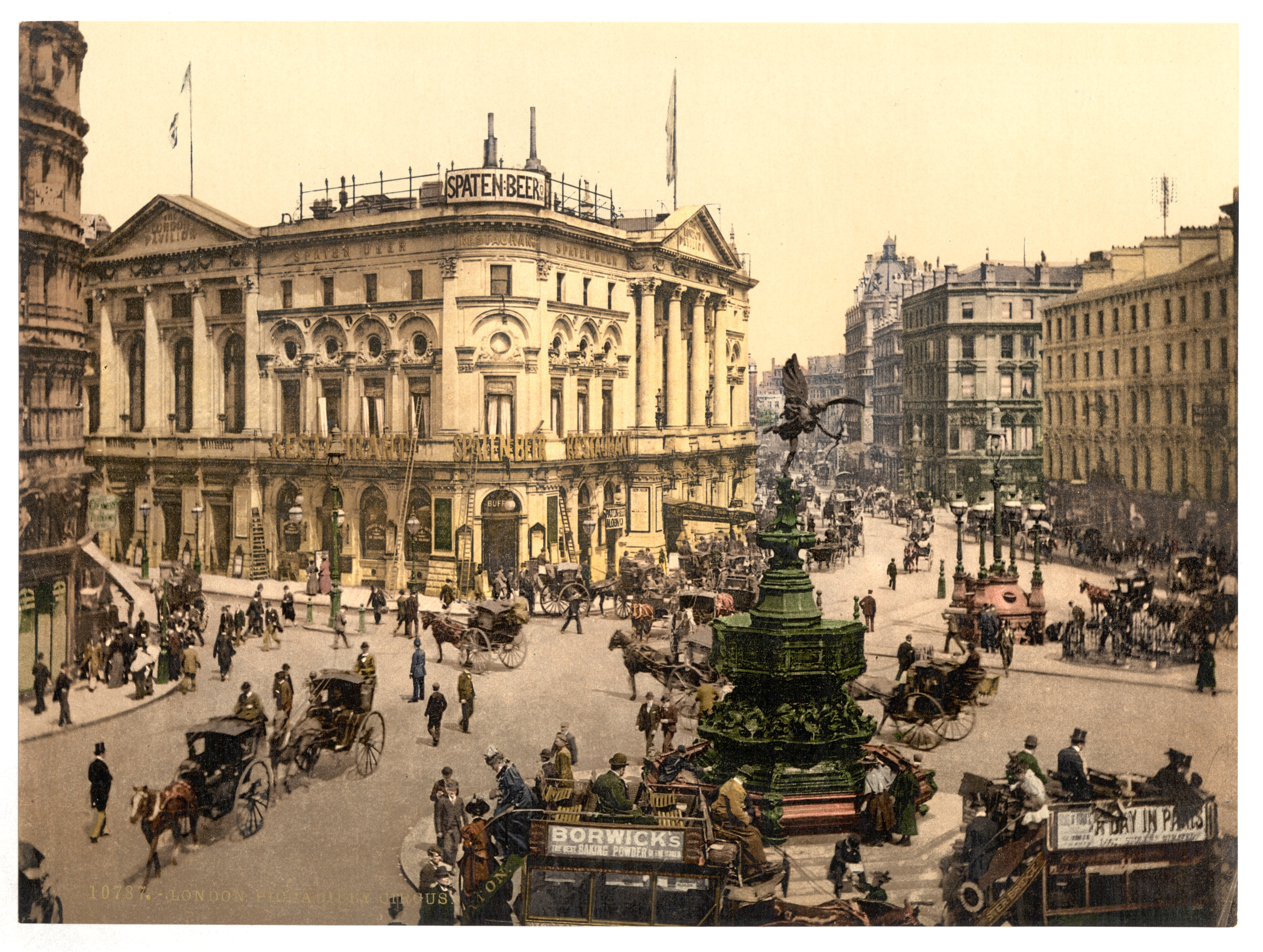
Piccadilly Circus and London Pavilion, c. 1900

Coventry Street was mostly made up of retail properties by the 19th century. In 1835, an exhibition named the "Parisian infernal machine" was set up on Coventry Street, that depicted a murderer attempting to assassinate the French royal family. During 1851, a French wizard known as Robin performed in a building on Coventry Street. Coventry Street was widened between 1877 and 1881 by reducing the frontage to properties on the southern side, as part of general traffic improvements in the area that also saw widening of Charing Cross Road and Shaftesbury Avenue.

The London Pavilion was at the corner of Coventry Street with Piccadilly Circus and Shaftesbury Avenue. It was established in 1861 as an extension to the Black Horse Inn, hosting music hall events. It was demolished in 1885 and rebuilt and reopened by Edmund Villiers, becoming a theatre in 1918. It subsequently became a cinema, closing in 1982. The site is now part of the Trocadero Shopping Centre.

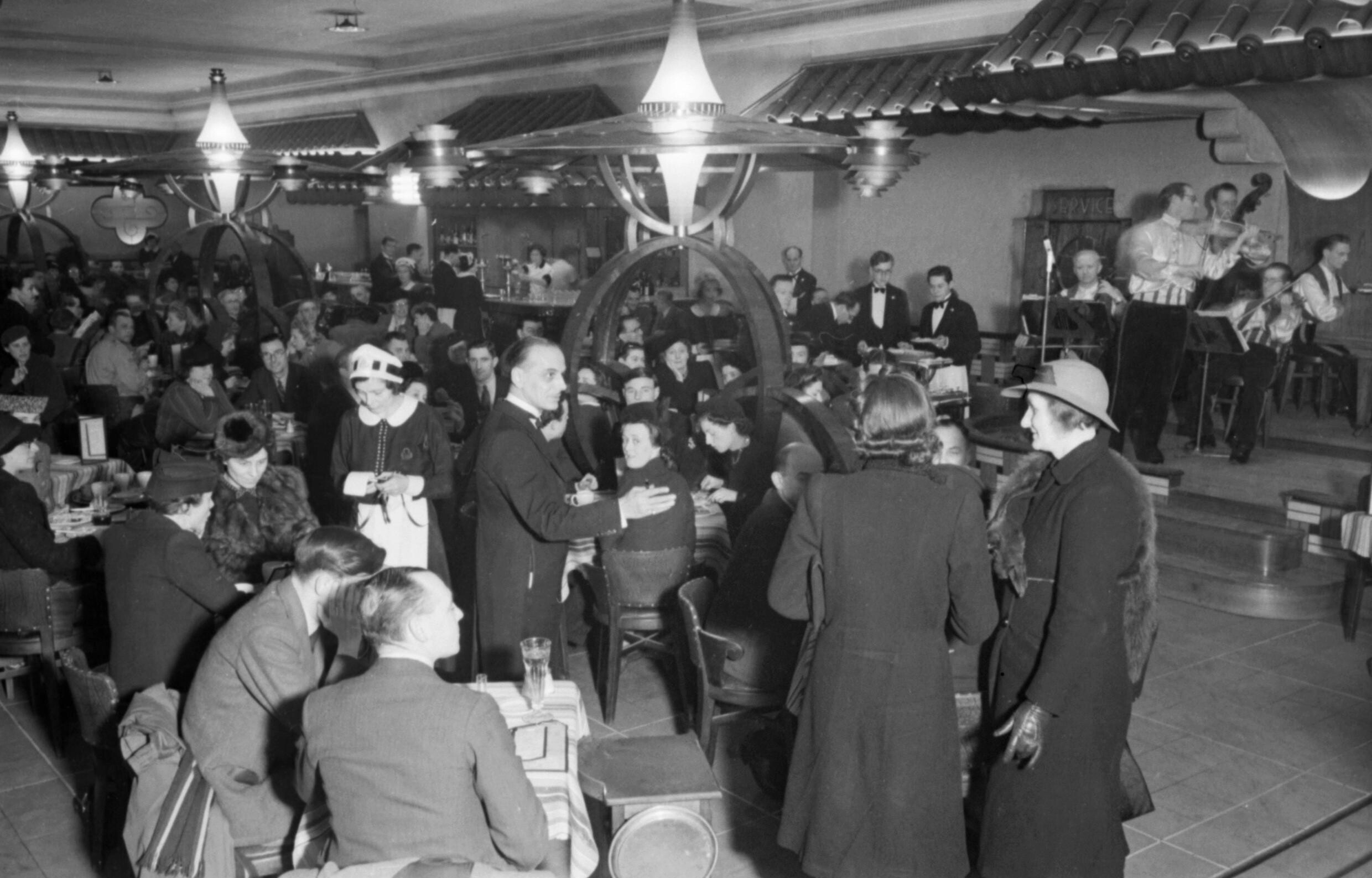
Diners at the Lyons Corner House on Coventry Street in 1942

Charles Hirsch, a bookseller, sold French literature and pornography from his shop "Librairie Parisienne" in Coventry Street in the late 19th century. Hirsch was friends with Oscar Wilde and claimed to have sold him various items of homosexual pornography.

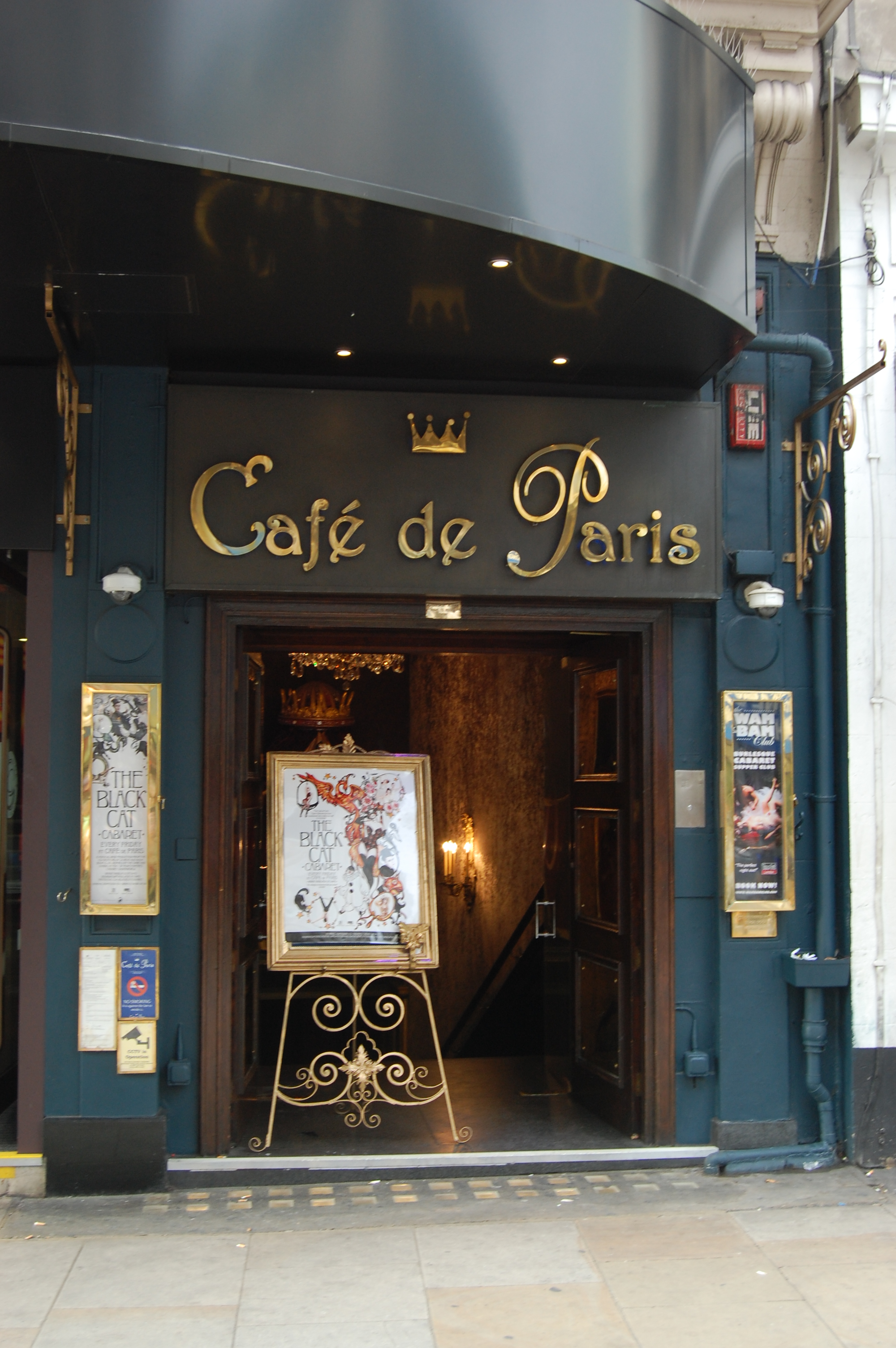
The Café de Paris has been established on Coventry Street since 1924.

The Prince Of Wales Theatre opened in 1884 on Coventry Street. It was built for and financed by actor-manager Edgar Bruce from profits made at the Scala Theatre. The Private Secretary, written by Charles Hawtrey, was first performed here. Throughout the 20th century it mainly performed musicals and revues, with occasional ventures into farce. The theatre was rebuilt in 1937, and again between 2003 and 2004 at a cost of £7.5 million. It can now accommodate 1,133 patrons.

Coventry Street has been a centre for high-volume food outlets. The first J. Lyons and Co. Corner House was built on Coventry Street in 1907, on the west corner with Rupert Street. It was one of the first buildings in London to have a white-glazed terracotta exterior. In 1920, the former premises of Lamberts at Nos. 10–12 were demolished in order to accommodate an extension that could accommodate up to 3,000 diners. Scott's Restaurant first operated in Coventry Street. Originally opening as an oyster warehouse in 1872 at No. 18 as part of the London Pavilion, it moved to No. 19 in 1891, expanding as a full restaurant. The restaurant moved to Mount Street in Mayfair in 1967. In 1887, the Leicester, a public house, opened at the corner of Coventry Street and Wardour Street. It closed in 1927 so the neighbouring department store could expand.

In the 1920s, the street became a centre for nightclubs, attracting clientele such as Edward, Prince of Wales, Rudolph Valentino, Noël Coward, Fred Astaire and Charlie Chaplin. The Café de Paris opened in 1924 in the basement of the Rialto Cinema (which had opened in 1913) and became a popular club through the rest of the decade because of the owner Martin Poulsen's friendship with the Prince of Wales. On 8 March 1941, the Cafe and much of Coventry Street suffered significant damage from bombing as part of the Blitz, killing 84 people including Poulsen, though former Prime Minister Stanley Baldwin, visiting the cafe, survived. Owing to a lack of water, a leg wound had to be washed with champagne as it was the only suitable substance to hand. The restaurant was rebuilt after the war and became a private venue in 1957. The Flamingo Club, a jazz nightclub, started on Coventry Street in 1952. It moved in 1957 to Wardour Street, where it became a popular venue for British rhythm and blues.

The Swiss Centre, at the far eastern end of the street adjoining Leicester Square was constructed between 1963–66 and designed by David du R. Aberdeen and Partners. A Swiss clock was attached to the premises in 1985. The centre was demolished in 2008, with the clock moving to Leicester Square in 2011.

== Cultural references ==
On 16 April 1922 a man was assaulted while walking down Coventry Street around 6.00am. He fell unconscious after the attack, and was rushed to Charing Cross Hospital, where he was found to have been stabbed in the neck by a thin tube. After another man was attacked a few hours later in a similar manner, followed by a third victim in the evening, an urban legend spread that a vampire was stalking Coventry Street. No further incidents occurred and the attacker was never found and convicted.

Coventry Street is one of the yellow property squares on the British Monopoly board. The other squares are Leicester Square and Piccadilly, both of which connect to it. All three streets share a common theme of entertainment and nightlife.
