= Clareville House =

Historic building in London, England

Coordinates: 51.5098°N 0.1315°W

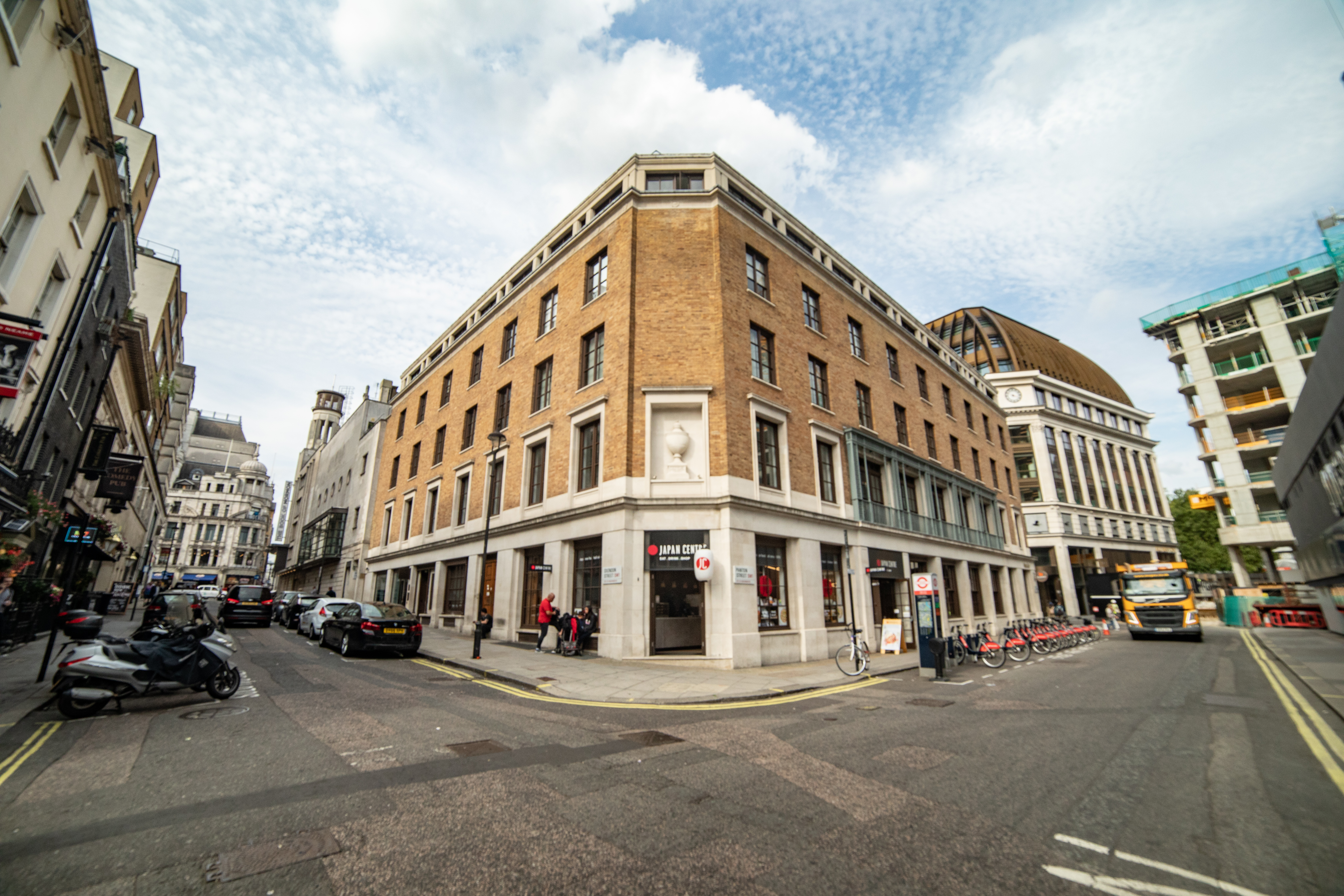
Clareville House

Clareville House is a grade II listed office building with retail premises on the ground floor on the north side of Panton Street, in the City of Westminster, London. It also borders Oxenden Street and Whitcomb Street. The narrow and pedestrianised Whitcomb Court is on the north side of the building. It was designed in 1955 by Albert Richardson and built in 1961–1963 for Stone's Chop House which closed in 1981.
