= David Aberdeen =

English architect

- Born: David William du Roi Aberdeen; 13 August 1913; Poplar, London, England
- Died: 15 January 1987 (aged 73); Enfield, London, England
- Occupation: Architect

David William du Roi Aberdeen (13 August 1913 – 15 January 1987) was an English architect.

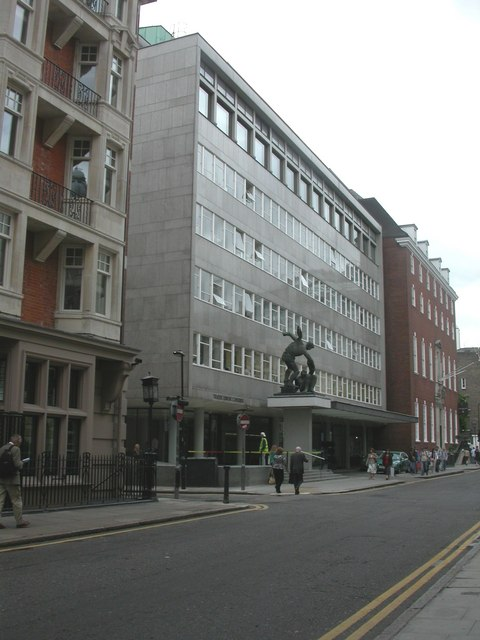
Congress House

In 1948, Aberdeen won an architectural competition to design the new TUC headquarters building in Great Russell Street, London. Staff began to move into the offices in 1956 and the building was officially opened in 1958. Today the building is Grade II* listed.

Congress House was officially opened on 27 March 1958 along with the unveiling of the sculpture by Jacob Epstein, intended as a memorial to the dead trade unionists of both world wars, in the courtyard. It was one of the earliest post-war buildings to be listed at Grade II*, in 1988. As of 2020, it still serves as the TUC's headquarters and is available on a private hire basis for events.

Aberdeen's other work includes the Aircraft Assembly Buildings at Filton, Bristol (jointly with Eric Ross), 1947-49, the Swiss Centre in Leicester Square, London, 1961-8, and Shrewsbury Market Hall, 1965.
