= Theophilus Lucas =

English writer on gambling

Theophilus Lucas (fl. c. 1714) is known for writing a successful book about gambling.

He inherited, according to his own assertion, an estate of £2,000 a year, which he lost at the gaming tables. To deter his son, who was the "very next heir to £1,500 per annum by the death of an uncle", from following his example, or, at best, to put him on his guard against the tricks of card-sharpers, he wrote an entertaining, in places scandalous, book entitled Memoirs of the Lives, Intrigues, and Comical Adventures of the most famous Gamesters and celebrated Sharpers in the reigns of Charles II, James II, William III, and Queen Anne; "wherein is contain'd the secret History of Gaming. The whole calculated for the meridians of London, Bath, Tunbridge, and the Groom-Porters" (1714). A third edition, with additions, was published without the author's name in 1744.

This book, which owes nothing to Charles Cotton's The Compleat Gamester (1674), has been of great use to biographers, though its statements must obviously be received with caution. Whether Theophilus Lucas had a real existence or was merely the pseudonym of some bookseller's hack, it is apparently impossible to determine.

Alexander Smith, in the following years, published several works in similar vein; his biographer Thomas Seccombe wrote: "It is not improbable that his industry was stimulated by the success obtained by Theophilus Lucas from his Lives of the Gamesters.
