= Oxendon Street =

Street in London, England

Coordinates: 51.509821°N 0.131905°W

Oxendon Street

Oxendon Street is a short street in London that runs from Coventry Street in the north to Orange Street in the south. It is named after the gambler Henry Oxendon who hand claims on landholdings in the area.

== History and description ==
In 1669, Thomas Panton acquired Shaver's Hall, possibly by dealing with Henry Oxendon who was in an inheritance dispute over the land after the previous owner, Oxendon's father-in-law Robert Baker, had died. Panton began laying out the street on its land in 1671 after successfully petitioning the Privy Council to allow him to develop the land despite a "late proclamation" against building by Charles II. The building work was overseen by Christopher Wren.

The street includes the Grade II listed house at No. 8, original structure but with a remodelled 19th century style facade by N. J. Aslan of 1958. It has a sundial dated to 1679 with the inscription of 'Vigilia Oraque'. Also on the street are the Prince of Wales Theatre and the Harold Pinter Theatre where it intersects Panton Street.
