= Thomas Panton (gambler) =

English gambler and property speculator

Thomas Panton (died 1685) was an English gambler and property speculator. Panton Street, in London SW1, is named after him.

== Life ==
Panton was the youngest son of John Panton, the representative of an old Leicestershire family, living in Ashby-de-la-Zouch. When the nucleus of a regular army was formed by Charles II in 1661, Panton, who appears to have attended the King abroad and already enjoyed a titular colonelcy, obtained a commission in His Majesty's Life Guards, and also held a captaincy in the Foot Guards. He drew his pay from both regiments until 1667, when, having become a Roman Catholic, he resigned his commissions into the King's hands during a review in St James's Park.

He won the favour of several of the ladies about the court, and relieved them of considerable sums at the card-table. Some of his gallantries are recorded by Theophilus Lucas, but it was as a card-player that Panton really excelled. "There was no game," says Lucas, "but what he was an absolute artist at it, either upon the Square or Foul play. … His chief game was hazard, and in one night at this play he won as many thousand pounds as purchased him an estate of above £1,500 a year."

After this coup, Panton married Dorothy Stacy, the daughter of John Stacy of London; he bought the manor of Cuxhall in Bucknall, and other estates in Herefordshire, and entirely abjured all games of chance. He speculated, however, in property in London; he bought from Mrs Baker, about 1670, the well-known seventeenth-century gaming-house known as Piccadilly Hall, improved this property, and in 1671 began building property on the street now known as Panton Street, adjoining Haymarket.

He died in 1685, and was buried on 26 October of that year in Westminster Abbey. His widow resided in a mansion on Haymarket, and died on 1 April 1725, at the age of eighty-four; she was buried alongside her husband on 5 April.

== Family ==
Thomas and Dorothy Panton's eldest son, Thomas Panton, carried intelligence of the Battle of Blenheim to the States General of the Netherlands, was severely wounded at the Battle of Malplaquet on 11 September 1709, took the news of the capture of Douai to the Court of St James's in 1710, and returned to the camp at Bouchain in September 1711, bearing the Queen's inquiries as to the Duke of Marlborough's health. He became major-general on 1 May 1730, lieutenant-general on 5 November 1735, and died on 20 July 1753, the oldest general in the army.

Panton's eldest daughter, Elizabeth (died 1700), married about 1679 Henry, Fifth Baron Arundell of Wardour; another daughter, Dorothy, married in 1675 William Stanley of Chelsea.
