= List of public art in the London Borough of Islington =

This is a list of public art in the London Borough of Islington.

== Barnsbury ==
Image	Title / subject	Location and coordinates	Date	Artist / designer	Type	Designation	Notes
	Thornhill Road Gardens War Memorial	Thornhill Road Gardens, junction of Thornhill Road and Richmond Avenue 51.5389°N 0.1102°W	1920	?	War memorial with Celtic cross	Grade II	
	Animal Park	Thornhill Bridge Community Gardens 51.5353°N 0.1171°W	2006	Monica Shanta Brown	Mosaics	—N/a	
	Cally Cyclelegs	Caledonian Road	2016	The Klassnik Corporation	Cycle racks	—N/a	The racks incorporate unexpected shapes, including a cabriole leg and the leg of a greyhound.
	Huntingdon Arms sculpture	115 Hemingford Road (former Huntingdon Arms pub) 51.5409°N 0.1136°W		?	Relief sculpture	—N/a	

== Canonbury ==
Image	Title / subject	Location and coordinates	Date	Artist / designer	Type	Designation	Notes
	Horizon	Canonbury Square, eastern section 51.5437°N 0.0999°W	2019	David Harber	Armillary sphere	—N/a	

== Clerkenwell ==
Image	Title / subject	Location and coordinates	Date	Artist / designer	Architect / other	Type	Designation	Notes
	Justice, Mercy, Portrait of George III and other motifs	Middlesex Sessions House, Clerkenwell Green	1779–1782 (building)	Joseph Nollekens	Thomas Rogers	Relief sculptures	Grade II*	
	Postal Workers' War Memorial Western Postal District	Mount Pleasant Mail Centre, Farringdon Road 51.5246°N 0.1111°W	1920	?		Aedicule	Grade II	Unveiled 1 January 1920 at Wimpole Street Post Office, Marylebone. After that post office's closure in 1981 the memorial moved to the delivery offices in Rathbone Place; when they in turn closed in 2013 it moved to its current site.
	Oxeye	St John Street	2010	Paul Morrison	Rolfe Judd	Façade motif	—N/a	
	Edgerunner	Owens Field, Goswell Road 51°31′50.8″N 0°06′18″W	2012	Paul Neagu	—N/a	Sculpture	—N/a	Unveiled 25 July 2012.
	JJ Mack Building V2 memorial	JJ Mack Building, Charterhouse Street 51.51865°N 0.10520°W				Memorial		Memorial to victims of the V-2 rocket attack on 8 March 1945. The circles represent a cross-section of a V-2 rocket and its internal piping.

== Farringdon ==
Image	Title / subject	Location and coordinates	Date	Artist / designer	Type	Designation	Notes
	Samson and Deliah	Greenhill Rents 51.5198°N 0.1027°W	~1609–1610	Peter Paul Rubens	Painting	—N/a	Copy made for the National Gallery's "On Tour" exhibition in 2007.
More images	Memorial to Edward Johnston	Farringdon station	2017	Fraser Muggeridge	Mural	—N/a	Unveiled 24 June 2019. Giant reversed wooden letters in the typeface Johnston designed for the London Underground.
	Avalanche	Farringdon station	2018	Simon Periton	Glazing motif	—N/a	A sequence of large diamonds appearing to tumble down the escalator, alluding to the jewellers, goldsmiths and ironsmiths of nearby Hatton Garden.
	Spectre	Farringdon station	2018	Simon Periton	Glazing motif	—N/a	Based on a drawing by Christopher Dresser titled Force and Energy (c. 1867–1873), contemporary with Smithfield Market which is adjacent to the station. Periton's design also references the etched glass found in Victorian pubs.

== Finsbury ==
Image	Title / subject	Location and coordinates	Date	Artist / designer	Type	Designation	Notes
	Science and Agriculture	City, University of London, College Building	c. 1894 – c. 1896	Paul Raphael Montford	Frieze	Grade II	
More images	Martha Smith Memorial Drinking Fountain	Finsbury Square 51.5206°N 0.0860°W	1899	J. Whitehead and Sons	Drinking fountain	Grade II	
More images	Finsbury War Memorial	Rosebery Avenue 51.5281°N 0.1068°W	15 August 1921	Thomas Rudge	War memorial with statue	Grade II	
More images	Faceted Column	Corner of Chiswell Street and Finsbury Pavement 51.5204°N 0.0875°W	1999	Stephen Cox	Sculpture	—N/a	
	Memorial to the Moorgate tube crash	Finsbury Square	2013	?	Memorial	—N/a	Unveiled 28 July 2013.
	Network	Old Street Yard	c. 2017	Thomas J. Price	Sculpture	—N/a	
	Mercury	Top of Triton Court, Finsbury Square		?			
	2 figures of Triton the God	Triton Court, Finsbury Square					
	4 females	Triton Court clock tower, Finsbury Square					

== Finsbury Park ==
Image	Title / subject	Location and coordinates	Date	Artist / designer	Type	Designation	Notes
More images	Crossed pistols tile motif	Finsbury Park station, Victoria line platforms	1968	Tom Eckersley		—N/a	
	Balloon mosaics	Finsbury Park station, Piccadilly line platforms	1983	Annabel Grey		—N/a	
	Sustrans Portrait Bench	Outside Finsbury Park station 51.5649°N 0.1056°W	2013	?	Sculpture	—N/a	Depicts Jazzie B, Edith Garrud and Florence Keen.
	Gillespie Park triptych	Seven Sisters Road, by the entrance to Gillespie Park 51.5640°N 0.1058°W	2013	London School of Mosaic	Mosaic	—N/a	Made with two local schools and approximately 20 volunteers; represents the flora and fauna of the park. Unveiled 2 December 2013.
	Elm Tree of Life	Finsbury Park station Wells Terrace entrance 51.5653°N 0.1076°W	2020	Carrie Reichardt, Karen Francesca and ATM	Mosaic	—N/a	Opened 22 October 2020.
	CIL Mosaic	City North Place, at junction with Goodwin Street 51.5645°N 0.1075°W	2021	Carrie Reichardt	Mosaic	—N/a	Opened during the week of 20 September 2021. Commissioned by the Business Design Centre Group (BDCG) to honour Sam Morris, founder of BDCG and City Industrial Limited (CIL).

== Highbury ==
Image	Title / subject	Location and coordinates	Date	Artist / designer	Type	Designation	Notes
More images	Boer War Memorial	Highbury Fields	1905	Bertram Mackennal	War memorial with statue	Grade II	
	Statue of Francis Bacon	Islington Central Library, Holloway Road	1906	Frederick Schenck	Statue in niche	Grade II	
	Statue of Edmund Spenser	Islington Central Library, Holloway Road	1906	Frederick Schenck	Statue in niche	Grade II	
	The Neighbours	Highbury Quadrant Estate 51.5585°N 0.0936°W	1957	Siegfried Charoux	Sculptural group	Grade II	
More images	Highbury Manor tile motif	Highbury & Islington station, Victoria line platforms	1968	Edward Bawden		—N/a	

== Highgate ==
Highgate is partly located outside the borough of Islington; for works not listed here see the relevant sections for the boroughs of Camden and Haringey.

Image	Title / subject	Location and coordinates	Date	Artist / designer	Type	Designation	Notes
	St Aloysius' College War Memorial	Hornsey Lane 51.5703°N 0.1388°W	after 1918	?	Canopied calvary with relief	Grade II	The Carrara marble relief shows the Crucifixion with the Three Maries at the foot of the Cross.
More images	Dick Whittington's cat	Whittington Stone, Highgate Hill 51.5665°N 0.1369°W	1964	Jonathan Kenworthy	Sculpture	Grade II	
	War memorial	St Joseph's Church 51.569°N 0.1423°W		?	Calvary	—N/a	

== Holloway ==
Image	Title / subject	Location and coordinates	Date	Artist / designer	Type	Designation	Notes
	Upon Reflection	Philip Noel-Baker Peace Garden, Elthorne Park, Upper Holloway	1985	Kevin Atherton	Sculpture	—N/a	A self-portrait statue, with the artist gazing at his reflection in a pond. Removed after less than two years and presumed lost until it was discovered in the basement of Islington Town Hall in 2020, the work was reinstated in 2021.
More images	Prayer of Peace	Elthorne Park, Upper Holloway	1986	Emmanuel Taiwo Jegede	Sculpture	—N/a	
More images	Statue of Tony Adams	Emirates Stadium	2011	MDM	Statue	—N/a	Unveiled 9 December 2011.
More images	Statue of Herbert Chapman	Emirates Stadium	2011	MDM	Statue	—N/a	Unveiled 9 December 2011.
More images	Statue of Thierry Henry	Emirates Stadium	2011	Margot Roulleau-Gallais	Statue	—N/a	Unveiled 9 December 2011.
More images	Statue of Dennis Bergkamp	Emirates Stadium	2014	MDM	Statue	—N/a	Unveiled 22 February 2014.
More images	Statue of Ken Friar	Emirates Stadium	2014	MDM	Statue	—N/a	Unveiled 28 February 2014.
	Memorial to Windrush and Commonwealth NHS nurses and midwives	Whittington Hospital	2021	?	Sculpture	—N/a	Unveiled 10 September 2021.
	Statue of Arsène Wenger	Emirates Stadium	2023	Jim Guy	Statue	—N/a	Unveiled 28 July 2023.
	Whittington Cat	Whittington Hospital	?	Art Contact	Architectural sculpture	—N/a	A parallax sculpture which appears to assemble or disassemble depending on where the viewer stands.

== Newington Green ==
Image	Title / subject	Location and coordinates	Date	Artist / designer	Type	Designation	Notes
	A Sculpture for Mary Wollstonecraft Mary Wollstonecraft	Newington Green 51.5515°N 0.0851°W	2020	Maggi Hambling	Sculpture	—N/a	Unveiled 10 November 2020.

== Pentonville ==
Image	Title / subject	Location and coordinates	Date	Artist / designer	Type	Designation	Notes
	War memorial at St Silas's Church	Risinghill Street 51.5335°N 0.1117°W	1917	Arthur George Walker	Memorial cross	Grade II	
	An Invitation to Dance on the Grave... Grimaldi/Dibdin	Joseph Grimaldi Park	2010	Henry Louis Krokatsis	Sculpture	—N/a	Two coffin shapes set into the ground, with bronze tiles which play the tune "Hot Codlins" when they are danced upon.

== St Luke's ==
Image	Title / subject	Location and coordinates	Date	Artist / designer	Type	Designation	Notes
	Christ Healing the Blind Man	Moorfields Eye Hospital, King George V Extension	1933–1935 (building)	Eric Gill	Relief sculpture		
	Column	Lexicon, City Road	2019	Studio Swine	Sculpture	—N/a	An aluminium cast of a rock perched on a Corten steel sheet.
	Opening the Lock Gate	Outside 250 City Road, opposite City Road Basin 51.52936°N 0.09666°W	2020	Ian Rank-Broadley	Sculptural group	—N/a	Unveiled March 2020. Marks the bicentenary of the Regent's Canal. This and the two sculptures unveiled in 2024 were commissioned in February 2018.
	Lady and Rope	Public courtyard at 250 City Road 51.52888°N 0.09622°W	2024	Ian Rank-Broadley	Sculpture	—N/a	
	Man Leading Horse	Public courtyard at 250 City Road 51.52886°N 0.09596°W	2024	Ian Rank-Broadley	Sculpture	—N/a	

== St Mary's ==
Image	Title / subject	Location and coordinates	Date	Artist / designer	Type	Designation	Notes
More images	Commerce Welcoming All Nations	Battishill Street Gardens, Napier Terrace 51.539821°N 0.104189°W	1842; 1975 (unveiled on present site)	Musgrave Watson	Sculpted frieze	—N/a	Originally in Edward Moxhay's Hall of Commerce, Threadneedle Street, demolished 1922. Relocated for the opening of the garden in 1975, and restored in 2024–2025 by the Heritage of London Trust.
	Sculpture of hen with chicks	Hen and Chickens Theatre Bar, 109 St Paul's Road 51.5461°N 0.1020°W	1854	?	Relief sculpture	—N/a	
	Sculpture of hounds chasing hare	181 Upper Street (formerly the Hare and Hounds pub) 51.5421°N 0.1031°W	c. 1856	?	Relief sculpture	—N/a	
More images	Statue of Hugh Myddelton	Islington Green 51.5357°N 0.1036°W	1862	John Thomas	Statue	Grade II	
	Sculpture of three wheatsheaves	56 Upper Street (formerly the Three Wheatsheaves pub) 51.5355°N 0.1042°W	c. 1864	?	Relief sculpture	—N/a	
	Four caryatids	116–118 Upper Street (formerly the Northern District Post Office) 51.5384°N 0.1025°W	c. 1906	?	Statues	Grade II	
	Female figure	75 and 75A Upper Street (originally the entrance to the Electric Theatre cinema, 1908–1916) 51.5364°N 0.1037°W	1908	?	Statue on dome	Grade II	The figure originally held an electric lighted globe.
	New River mosaic	City of London Academy Islington, Packington Street	1964	William Mitchell	Mosaic		
	Memorial to Thomas Paine	Angel Court, Owen Street	1991	Kevin Jordan	Obelisk	—N/a	
	Angel	Angel tube station	1996	Kevin Boys	Statue	—N/a	
	Angel on the Green	Anderson Square garden 51.5366°N 0.1026°W	1999	John Roberts	Statue	—N/a	Unveiled 6 September 1999.
More images	Angel Wings	N1 Retail Plaza, The Angel, Islington	2003	Wolfgang Buttress and Fiona Heron	Sculpture	—N/a	
More images	Halo	N1 Retail Plaza, The Angel, Islington	2003	Wolfgang Buttress and Fiona Heron	Sculpture	—N/a	
More images	Islington Green War Memorial	Islington Green	2004 (replacing an earlier "temporary" war memorial)	John Maine	War memorial	—N/a	
More images	Street Cat Bob	Islington Green 51.5363°N 0.1026°W	2021	Tanya Russell	Bronze sculpture	—N/a	Unveiled 15 July 2021.
	Sculpture of Old Parr's head, plus other designs	66 Cross Street / 290 Upper Street (formerly the Old Parr's Head pub) 51.5396°N 0.1023°W		?	Relief sculptures	—N/a	

== Shoreditch ==
Image	Title / subject	Location and coordinates	Date	Artist / designer	Type	Designation	Notes
More images	Statue of John Wesley	Wesley's Chapel, City Road 51.5237°N 0.0872°W	1891	John Adams-Acton	Statue	Grade II	

== Bibliography ==
- Cherry, Bridget; Pevsner, Nikolaus (2002). London: North. The Buildings of England. Vol. 4. London and New Haven: Yale University Press.
- O'Kane, Paul (2002). Donnell, Alison (ed.). "Jegede, Emmanuel Taiwo". Companion to Contemporary Black British Culture. Routledge. pp. 158–159.
