= Wyld's Great Globe =

Attraction of Victorian London

Coordinates: 51.5105°N 0.1301°W

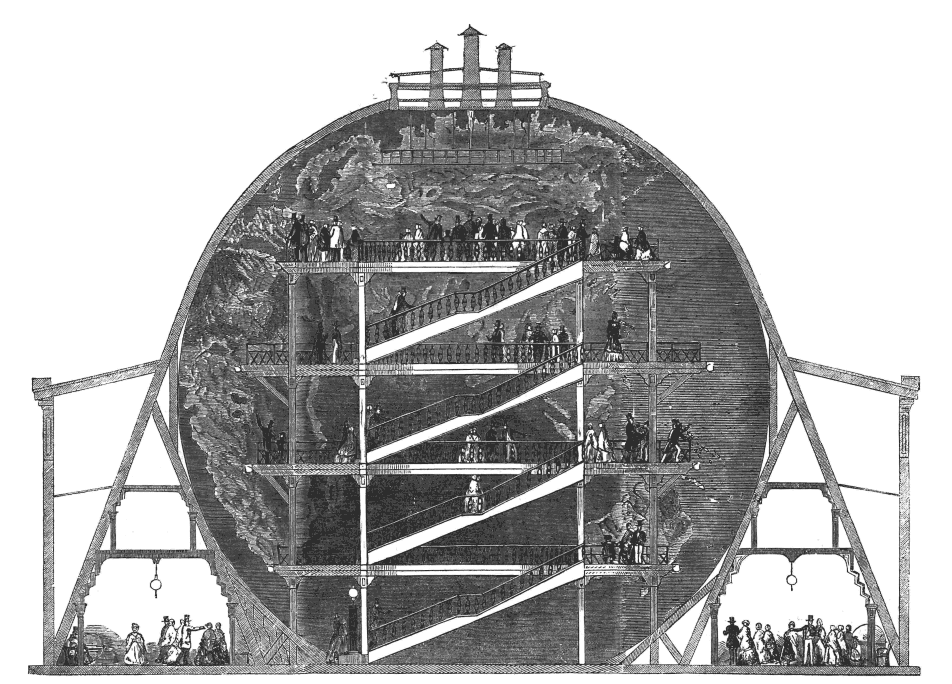
Interior of the Great Globe

Wyld's Great Globe (also known as Wyld's Globe or Wyld's Monster Globe) was an attraction situated in London's Leicester Square between 1851 and 1862, constructed by James Wyld (1812–1887), a distinguished mapmaker and former Member of Parliament for Bodmin.

At the centre of a purpose-built hall was a giant globe, 60 feet 4 inches (18.39 m) in diameter. The globe was hollow and contained a staircase and elevated platforms which members of the public could climb in order to view the surface of the Earth on its concave interior, modelled in plaster of Paris, complete with mountain ranges and rivers all to scale. Punch described the attraction as "a geographical globule which the mind can take in at one swallow." In the surrounding galleries were displays of Wyld's maps, globes and surveying equipment.

Wyld originally proposed that the globe should be constructed at the Great Exhibition, but its size and Wyld's desire to run it as a promotional venture precluded it from being featured inside the Crystal Palace, so Wyld negotiated with the owners of the gardens of Leicester Square, and after much wrangling secured an agreement to site it there for ten years. The exhibition hall and model of the Earth were hastily constructed to coincide with the Great Exhibition.

In its first year the Great Globe was a resounding success, with visitor numbers second only to those of the Great Exhibition, but from 1852 onward public interest in the attraction slowly waned. Though the novelty of a concave globe continued to win accolades for Wyld, he was faced with competition from other educational attractions, and had to adapt the entertainments on offer in order to maintain visitor numbers. Wyld held topical exhibitions and gave lectures on current events, and attempted to transfer ownership of the attraction to the "Cosmos Institute" to establish a national geographic and ethnological museum. In 1862, when Wyld's agreement for the use of the land expired, the exhibition hall was removed and the globe broken up and sold for scrap. The complicated ownership of Leicester Square gardens, combined with Wyld's failure to honour his agreement to restore the gardens after the removal of the exhibition building, led to extensive legal wrangling and questions in Parliament. Wyld finally sold his interests in the gardens, and in 1874 they were donated to the City of London.

Although there were other proposals for giant globes, and a few were constructed, it was not until 1935 that a large concave globe was recreated in the form of Chester Lindsay Churchill's Mapparium at the Mary Baker Eddy Library in Boston, Massachusetts.

== James Wyld ==
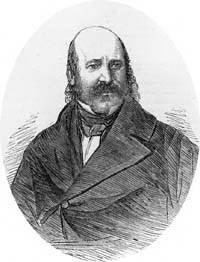
James Wyld (the Younger) (1812–1887)

James Wyld was a noted geographer and map-seller. He was the eldest son of James Wyld the Elder (1790–1836) and Eliza (née Legg). In 1838, he married Anne, the daughter of John Hester, and had two children, one of whom, James John Cooper Wyld also became a map publisher. On his father's death in 1836, Wyld became the sole owner of the thriving family mapmaking business based in Charing Cross. His maps, which covered regions as diverse as London and the gold fields of California, were regarded highly, and Wyld himself had an excellent reputation as a mapmaker; he was elected as a fellow of the Royal Geographical Society in 1839, and he was appointed Geographer to Queen Victoria and Prince Albert (as had been his father before him).

He had an opportunistic approach to the business and was a prolific publisher of maps and guides (so much so that Punch claimed that if a country were discovered in the interior of the Earth Wyld would produce a map of it "as soon as it is discovered, if not before"), but his projects were not always successful; although he profited from the "Railway Mania" of the later 1830s, he became entangled in a number of court cases with unsuccessful railway companies as a result, and he overreached himself by printing maps and guides of the London rail network which included stations and connections that were planned but subsequently not built. He helped start both the Association of Surveyors and the Surveyors' Institution to lobby against the Ordnance Survey, as he felt its activities threatened his business, but when these associations failed, he pragmatically got his company appointed as one of the six official outlets for the new OS maps. He had an account at the Royal British Bank, which collapsed in 1856, wiping out the savings of many of the depositors, but the extent of his losses is not recorded. (Note: Wyld was the chairman of the depositors committee which managed to negotiate a favourable return of 15 shillings in the pound from the shareholders)

He was also the Liberal MP for Bodmin, though his political career was on hiatus for much of the time that he managed the Great Globe. On his first election in 1848 there were charges of bribery at the polling stations, although it was decided that these accusations could not be substantiated, and he was allowed to take up his seat. His idea for the Great Globe had been many years in the formulation: a correspondent of Notes and Queries mentioned that as early as 1839, Wyld had broached the subject of a concave globe at a meeting to discuss an earlier giant globe project. (Note: This plan by William Vialls for a georama in London never progressed past the planning stage.)

== Site ==
Wyld had approached the organizing committee of the Great Exhibition with a plan to erect a giant globe within the exhibition hall. Although he presented it as an educational attraction, Wyld's ulterior motive was to use the globe to promote his map-making business. The size of the proposed exhibit and the organizers' decision that no commercial enterprises should use the exhibition as a platform to sell their goods or services led to the rejection of Wyld's plan. (Note: Wyld still had a display of his maps, globes and cartography equipment in one of the halls, and with typical opportunism prepared a penny map for the millions expected to visit the exhibition.) Undaunted, Wyld began to search for an alternate location for his project; the reason later given for not building within the Crystal Palace was purely the lack of space rather than any rejection by the organizing committee of the commercial aspect of the project. An article in The Builder on 30 November 1850 mentioned that negotiations were already underway to secure the gardens of Leicester Square. Described in Charles Dickens' Household Words as a "howling desert", the gardens were at that time an insalubrious area, "with broken railings, a receptacle for dead cats and every kind of abomination" and a meeting place for "ne'er well-to-do youths". Leicester Square had been Prince Albert's initial choice as a site for the Great Exhibition building, but the site was quickly dismissed as too small.

Wyld made an agreement with the owner of the gardens, Pheobe Moxhay, to acquire the freehold for £3,000, but the Tulk family, who owned the buildings on three sides of the square and already had a judgement against Moxhay's late husband, Edward Moxhay, would have been able to prevent Wyld building. They used this hold over him to negotiate a favourable deal for themselves: they would allow Wyld to use the land for ten years from 25 April 1851, after which he would remove any buildings that he had erected within six months, and each branch of the Tulk family would have a one-year option to buy half the land for £500. (Note: The Tulk family had bought part of the Leicester Square estate around 1758 and by an agreement in 1807 John Augustus Tulk had divided the estate with his eldest son Charles Augustus Tulk.) Although Wyld and the Tulks attempted to negotiate with the owner of the buildings on the north side of the square, Henry Webb, they were not able to reach an agreement, and they eventually signed the contract without his assent. When Wyld began to prepare the site, Webb announced his intention to take out an injunction to prevent the building work proceeding. Wyld restarted negotiations with Webb and eventually (in July 1851, over a month after the building had been completed) Webb agreed to allow the ten-year agreement with the Tulks to stand.

Wyld obviously still felt insecure about his claim on the land and, although he was not an MP himself between 1852 and 1857, over the years a number of bills surfaced in Parliament aimed at either establishing the title to the gardens in his favour or confirming the validity of the erection of the globe building. It appears that Wyld initially intended to seek public funding for the construction but after an estimate of the costs he considered it was unlikely that he would be able to secure reimbursement and decided instead on a purely commercial venture.

== Construction ==
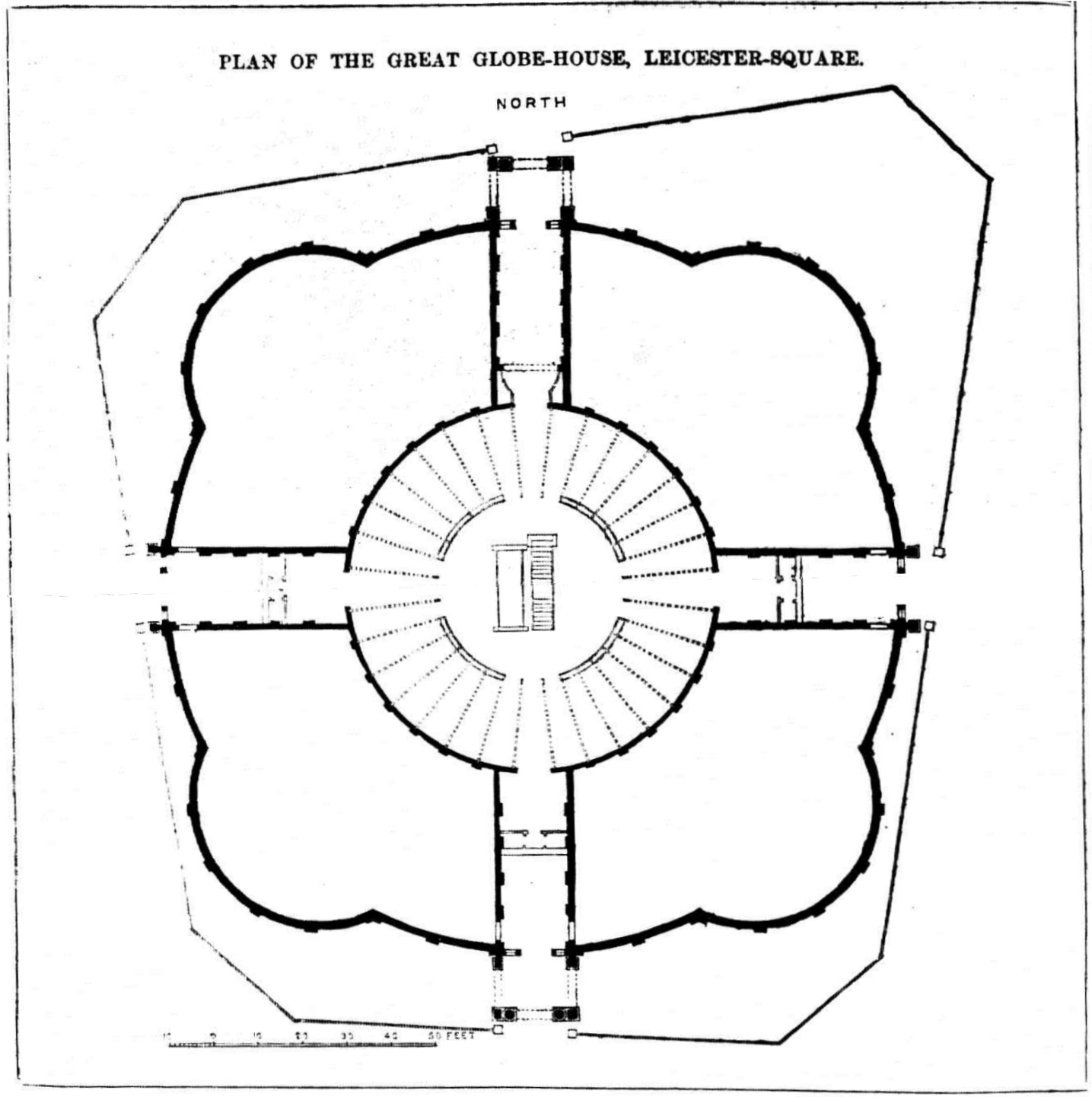
The plan for the Great Globe as published in The Builder on 5 April 1851. The exterior galleries shown in the plan were not finished until after the attraction opened.

=== Planning ===
Through an advertisement in The Builder, Wyld contracted Edward Welch as the architect for the project. Welch submitted his first set of plans in January 1851. These plans included the construction of four theatres which Wyld planned to rent out to recoup his expenses, but there was vigorous opposition from the residents of the square, and when Wyld put the plans out to tender, the cheapest quote – from George Myers – was £2,561. Welch negotiated this down to £1,888, but Wyld informed Welch that he considered the price prohibitive. As he was embroiled in negotiations with Henry Webb at the same time, Wyld decided that he would have to settle for something less ambitious and to "give up a great part of the original design of the building". He showed Welch's initial designs to the architect H.R. Abraham who considered that they were impractical. Wyld was worried about Welch's ability to meet his deadlines and asked him to pass any plans to Abraham for approval.

On 4 February, Wyld met with the residents of Leicester Square to present his plans for the gardens. At this meeting he claimed that in addition to the £3,000 he had paid for the freehold he had also agreed to pay £4,500 for the building and the works would cost £12,000; he would have to spend around £21,800 on the project in total, which included the outlay for new gardens and a new enclosure railing. After much discussion and receiving various assurances from Wyld that he would restore the gardens when the building was removed, the residents' committee approved his plan.

On 24 February, Wyld asked Welch to retire from the project, promising that he would be paid for the work he had done so far. Wyld then contracted Abraham to produce new plans. Abraham's designs included a new supporting wall for the globe itself (correcting what he saw as Welch's error of leaving the trusses unsupported), as well as buildings to cover the whole area of the gardens which Wyld would be able to rent out to recoup some of his costs. Despite what he had told the residents' committee, Wyld had set a budget of £2,000 for the entire building work and so could not afford the outlying buildings. Abraham's designs – minus the additional buildings, but with a 300-foot-long (91 m) circular Moorish corridor designed by G.A. Jermyn (Note: Sometimes seen as G.R. Jermyn) – got the final go-ahead on 15 March 1851, even though the new bids for the contract were substantially higher than they had been for Welch's original plans. George Myers' firm was again the cheapest at £2,755 and he was contracted to continue with the work. Both Welch and Abraham were eventually forced to sue to get their fees.

=== Building work ===
Though the design of the building was not finalized until mid-March, building work had commenced immediately upon the conclusion of the agreement with the Tulks (Wyld did not actually complete the purchase of the land from Moxhay until April). Before the globe could be erected it was necessary to remove the equestrian statue of George I by C. Burchard that had been erected in the centre of the gardens by Frederick, Prince of Wales in 1747 (perhaps to annoy his father George II, who had in turn been on poor terms with his father). Details of the statue's treatment are unclear; for the most part it was reported that it was lowered into a specially constructed pit that was located beneath the building when it was erected, but there were also stories that it was sawn up and buried or that Irish workers had dismantled it and taken pieces for themselves. A question was raised in Parliament as to the fate of the statue (mistakenly identified as George II) and, when questioned, Wyld – who by his own admission spent little time on site because he was "absorbed with [his] model" – replied that when it was examined it was found to be only lead packed with clay and thrown away with "other rubbish". In 1862 when the globe building was demolished, the horse's body was found lying on its side, and the head was reported to have been found wrapped in sacking.

Work progressed quickly. Wyld directed the project, but day-to-day site management was mostly left to Myers and Horatio Miller, an acquaintance of Wyld's who had taken an interest in the project. Miller was also later involved in a court case against Wyld, claiming that he had not been paid fairly for his work; the court found in Wyld's favour. Under the management of Myers, 300 builders raced to complete the building. The production of the casts which would form the internal surface of the globe was already well-advanced as Wyld had been working on them in a workshop in St Pancras since at least late October 1850. The project was not without its problems however. Although he had been contemplating the idea for many years, Wyld quickly realised once work was underway that the project called not just for money but for inventiveness; there were setbacks in the design and manufacture of the globe that "demanded an amount of labour and a degree of application, anxiety, and responsibility, of the extent of which no adequate estimate could be formed".

The Great Globe was not the first project of its kind: a small hollow globe was completed in 1664 for Frederick III, Duke of Holstein-Gottorp, and the Georama built by C. F. P. Delanglard (Note: Sometimes seen as just Langlard) in Paris in the 1820s had been on similar lines to Wyld's project – a large globe with the earth represented on the interior surface and a pair of spiral staircases from which visitors could view the attraction. The Georama had been smaller and of a simpler construction though, using material and paper draped over an iron frame, and the methods employed there would not have been applicable to Wyld's larger, more robust version.

The construction difficulties and minor accidents (a shed used by the labourers burned down on 18 May though nobody was injured) delayed the project slightly, but construction continued day and night and as the building rapidly took shape it attracted almost as much attention as the raising of the Crystal Palace. On 29 May, Wyld held a preview for the press and invited guests, and on 2 June 1851, one month after the Great Exhibition started, the Great Globe was ready to open its doors to the public. Abraham's design, although described as having "no pretension", did not meet with universal approval: for some who remembered Leicester Square as the home of artists Hogarth and Reynolds, the "bastard Byzantine architecture" was "hideous" and out of place. The residents of the square were less than pleased with the brick building as Wyld had led them to believe the globe would be housed in a Crystal Palace-like construction of glass and ironwork.

The project had cost substantially more than Wyld's budget. In the cases of Miller v Wyld and Abraham v Wyld, he claimed to have set aside £2,000 for the building work, but the estimated final cost was about £5,500, and would have run closer to £13,000 if Wyld had not cancelled the proposed outlying buildings. Abraham opined that Wyld's constant suggestions for (mostly impractical) alterations to the design added to both the cost and duration of the building works. In Household Words, Henry Morley estimated that the cost of producing the model was £20,000 rather than the £13,000 Wyld had quoted to the residents' meeting, or the £4,000 to £5,000 originally estimated.

== The Great Globe ==
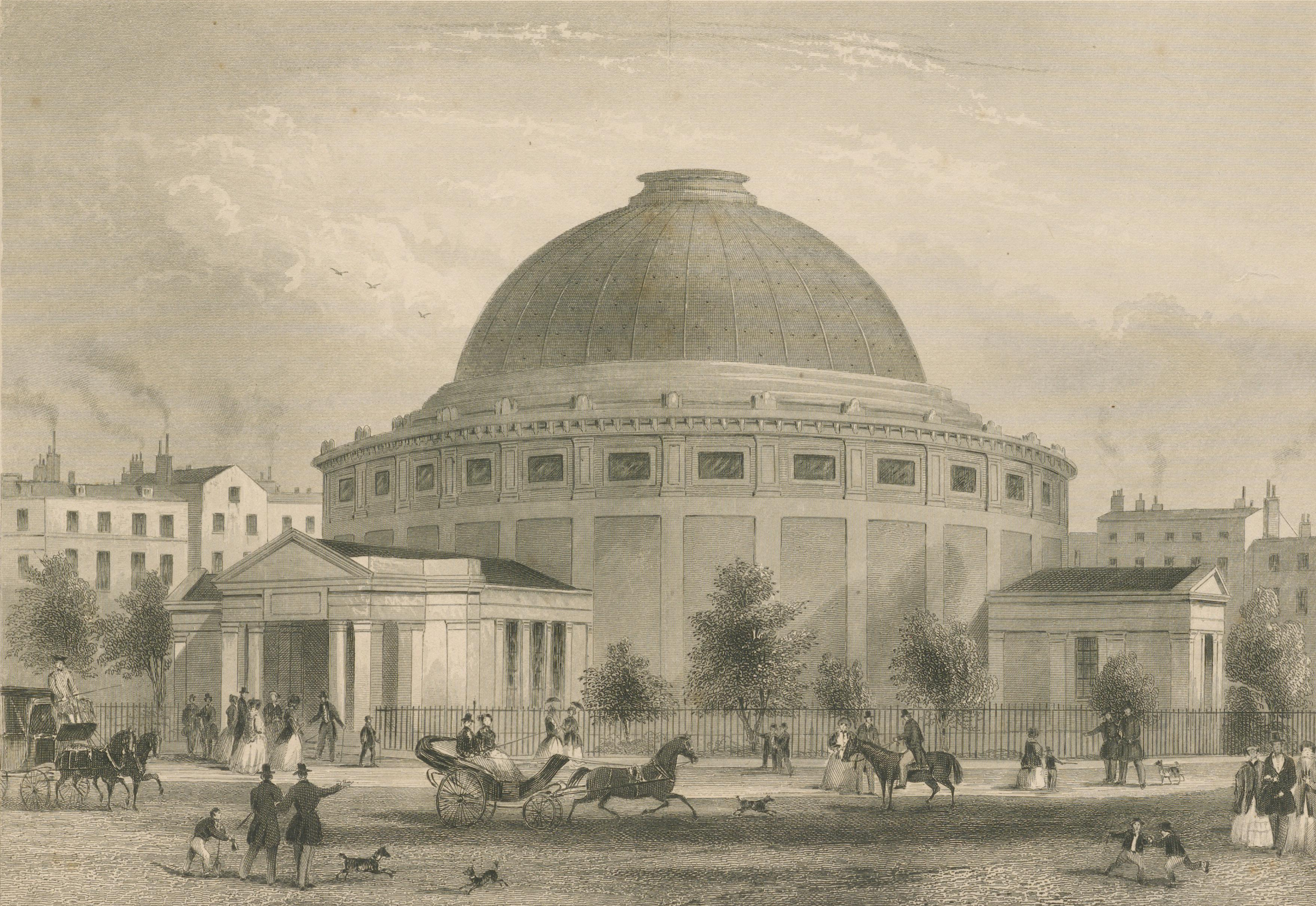
An early view of the Great Globe without the galleries

The building, which was reminiscent of the Coliseum in Regent's Park, was entered through the newly laid out gardens via one of four loggias facing north (the main entrance), south, east and west, which opened into a large vestibule paved with "patent lava" and from there through turnstiles into Jermyn's circular corridor. This corridor was hung with examples of Wyld's maps and there were examples of his guides and globes on display tables. The corridor was decorated with blue arabesques and lit by globe-shaped lamps with crimson tassels hung from ornate beams. The internal pillars were painted in a rich brown and decorated with copies of Moorish architectural designs from the Alhambra in Granada. The inner wall of this corridor was comprised in part by the rendered exterior surface of the Globe itself; the portion visible from within the corridor was painted blue with the positions of the stars in the night sky picked out in silver. The value of the star map as an educational tool was diminished as only a little of the convex face of the Globe was visible above the supporting wall and much of that was obscured by the numerous beams and supports criss-crossing the interior of the corridor.

The Architect criticised the internal decoration, much of which was by the theatrical scenery designer William Roxby Beverley, for being too restrained. Besides the circular corridor, Jermyn also designed a Moorish gate for the approach to the Globe's entrance. Four large galleries (Note: The galleries appear in the plans published in The Builder and later illustrations but not in the earlier illustrations) were later built between the loggias to surround the internal corridor and there was a refreshment stand to service the queues waiting to enter the globe. The building was about 180 feet (55 m) square and the external walls about 20 feet (6.1 m) high. The 68-foot-high (21 m) domed roof was originally specified in zinc, but Wyld insisted on it being made in lead, which had added to the cost and complexity of the build. Wyld complained that the building had not been finished to a high standard: there were cracks in the plaster and brickwork, leaks from rain, and there were complaints about the smell from the blocked drains almost as soon as the attraction opened to the public.

The external diameter of the globe itself was 60 feet 4 inches (18.39 m). The frame was formed by 32 large wooden trusses which were in turn supported by a brick enclosure rendered externally in cement. Between the trusses were smaller horizontal ribs from which zinc bands supported plaster casts of the features of the Earth created from clay originals. There were about 6,000 of these plaster casts, each about 3 feet (0.91 m) square and 1 inch (2.5 cm) thick. These castings had proved particularly problematic – not only did they have to butt together perfectly but they also had to have a tiny curvature to fit to the concave interior of the shell – Wyld had needed three attempts to perfect the design. The production procedure was also time-consuming: the appropriate scale section of the Earth's surface would first be traced out on paper, then transferred to clay modelled with the appropriate topography, from which a mould would be taken; the mould was then tried and any corrections made before a final cast was produced and passed to the painters for decoration. (Note: One of the modellers was dismissed because he placed "California in England and Panama in Egypt".)

By day the globe was illuminated by the light from the glass set into the dome directly above it and by night with gas lighting. Visitors entered the globe through an opening into the Pacific Ocean, then ascended through a series of four platforms. At each stage they could see a different portion of the world represented on the concave interior face of the globe. The platform scaffolding was built up from the conveniently desolate Southern Ocean; Antarctica was largely unknown at the time – Wyld dismissed stories of the existence of a great Southern continent:

It was formerly imagined that a great continent must exist somewhere towards the South Pole, to counterbalance the mass of land lying in the northern hemisphere, but the discoveries of the English, under Ross, and of the American, French, and Russian navigators, prove, that although a large mass of broken land, with volcanoes now burning, exists there, the southern continent cannot be of a great extent."

The platforms were separated by about 10 feet (3.0 m) and those closer to the Globe's equator were wider so there was always a gap of about 3 feet (0.91 m) between the platform and the surface of the globe. Although the staircase and platforms allowed closer examination of individual sections, the structure prevented an appreciation of the globe as a single unit, and later there were plans for its removal. Some ventilation was provided by a system housed at the North Pole, which had the advantage of being quite featureless and located at the top of the globe, but the heat generated from the gas lighting and the mass of visitors meant the attraction was still uncomfortably hot; Henry Morley remarked that "the heat reflected on all sides from the concave surfaces rises to make a little Sahara of the North Pole Station", and Punch commented that the temperature was "equal to that of any baker's oven."

The representation of the Earth's surface was to a scale of 10 miles to the inch (about 6.4 kilometres to the centimetre) in the horizontal plane, but to allow the details of mountain ranges and great craters to be easily observed the altitude scale was ten times that of the surface plane (at one mile to the inch). As the British Quarterly Review remarked in an article on the problems of accurately representing the Earth's features, Wyld would have had to construct a globe with three times the diameter to unify the scales. The depiction of the Earth concentrated on physical geography; there were no country names or borders shown. Fertile land was picked out in green and deserts shown in a sandy yellow. The minute detail was less than carefully observed; Wyld aimed for a broad stroke to capture the imagination rather than the accuracy of the Ordnance Survey. Active volcanoes were picked out with a fiery red with cotton wool smoke, and snowy mountains with white crystal that sparkled in the gas light. The Almanack of the Fine Arts for 1852 felt that the globe could "scarcely be deemed a work of art", but praised some of the fine tinting work.

== Attraction ==
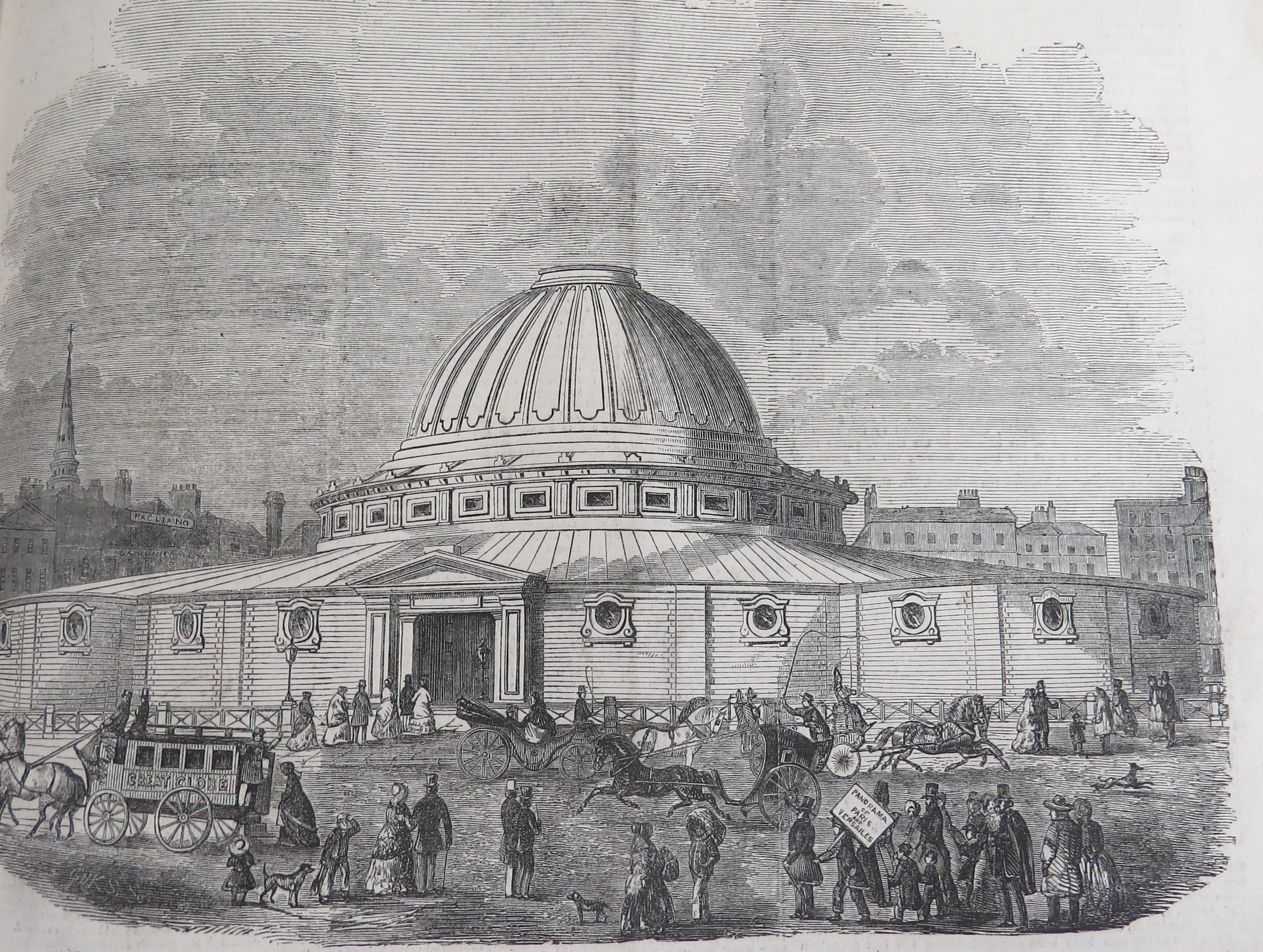
This image of the Globe (with completed galleries) shows a placard bearer in the foreground advertising one of Wyld's competitors: The Panorama of Paris and Versailles.

The globe was immediately popular; Wyld was a skilful self-promoter and the influx of visitors to London for the Great Exhibition helped in no small part. Figures from the Royal Commissioners showed that admittances to public exhibitions surged in 1851, with some attractions having almost a tenfold increase in visitors; during the five and half months it was open, the Great Exhibition was visited by more than 6 million people. In the first few weeks of the Globe's operation it was seen by an array of "distinguished personages", including Prince Albert (to whom Wyld had dedicated the project), Lord Castlereagh, the Duke of Wellington, the Austrian Ambassador and the King of Belgium.

Visitor numbers for the first two years are not recorded, but around 1.2 million visitors were estimated to have been admitted in 1853 (about 400,000 of these were let in for free). A guide to the attractions of London published to complement the Great Exhibition, Tallis's Illustrated London; in Commemoration of the Great Exhibition of All Nations in 1851. Forming a Complete Guide to The British Metropolis and its Environs by John Tallis included an entry for Wyld's Globe complete with an illustration – a magnanimous gesture on Tallis' part considering that he was one of Wyld's competitors – and most reviews of the Great Globe were complimentary. In 1851, only the Crystal Palace received more visitors. Wyld's Globe was said to be an "admirable pendant to the Great Exhibition". The globe was open from 10 am to 10 pm every day except Sundays. Admission cost one shilling, but on Thursdays and Saturdays this rose to two shillings and sixpence. School parties were admitted for half price.

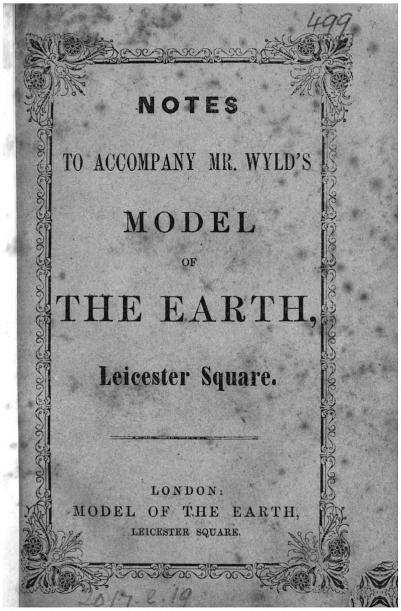
Wyld's accompanying guide ran to 132 pages.

Wyld produced a book to accompany the exhibition: Notes to Accompany Mr. Wyld's Model of the Earth, Leicester Square, a didactic tome which imparted the wealth of Wyld's geographic and historical knowledge while extolling the virtues of London, Britain, and the Empire and which doubled up as a sales catalogue for Wyld's maps at every opportunity. (Note: The introduction makes many mentions of the recent final expedition of John Franklin and ongoing attempts to discover its fate. Franklin had set sail in 1845 in an attempt to traverse the Northwest Passage; he and his crew were not officially pronounced dead until 1854.)

With the end of the Great Exhibition, Wyld faced a drop in visitor numbers; in an attempt to maintain the popularity of the attraction, he began to expand his half-hourly lectures on the Earth to include popular themes of the day. Although the Globe was still turning a profit, Wyld proposed divesting himself of the enterprise, by selling the land and building to the "Cosmos Institute" which would add further buildings alongside the Globe to create a national geographic and ethnological museum on the site. Wyld offered to sell the building and land (figures of £20,000–£25,000 were reported as the asking price in The Observer), and to raise the capital for the purchase and the proposed additional building work the Institute issued 50,000 shares of £1. Plans were drawn up by the architect Stephen Geary for the new additions and for the enhancements to the Globe itself; the Institute calculated that the attraction would turn a profit of £4,000 per annum. The issue of the ownership of the land and Wyld's right to sell was a stumbling block though, and the scheme eventually came to nothing despite a bill proposed in Parliament to establish the institute's title to the land, and the support of "a number of noble, learned, and reverend names" among them several bishops, the naturalist and explorer Alexander von Humboldt, the archaeologist Sir Austen Henry Layard, and the hydrographer Sir Francis Beaufort.

In 1853, Wyld arranged with the prospector John Calvert to exhibit a collection of gold nuggets and precious stones discovered in Australia. The "gold" was later discovered to be gilded lead casts. Wyld started a court case against Calvert claiming that he had been deceived, but Calvert told the jury that Wyld had always known that the genuine nuggets would not be displayed, had overseen the preparation of the casts and had even planned to drum up ticket sales with an elaborate publicity campaign based around a faked robbery, a charge that Wyld vehemently denied, stating that "no one but one who had been the associate of convicts for fifteen years would have ventured to suggest such a question" (a none-too-subtle reference to Calvert's time spent in Australia). (Note: In September 1853, The American Journal of Science and Arts reprinted The Athenaeum report from The Times of the yield after the nugget "lately exhibited at Mr. Wyld's Globe" had been melted down. Apparently none of the publications were aware of the fakes at that time.) The jury in the case was unable to reach a verdict, and while opinions differed on whether Wyld had been duped, it was clear that with topical exhibitions he had found a way to reinvigorate the attraction.

Wyld put on exhibitions on any subject that was in the public eye; among the most successful were an "Oriental Museum" which recreated scenes from life in Turkey, Armenia and Albania with dressed rooms and life-size models (and curiously also featured a model of Stonehenge), and a room dedicated to the Crimean War which featured dioramas by the theatrical scene painter Charles Marshall, and later a scale raised-relief map of Sevastopol featuring model armies which was updated daily to show the troop movements. When a large collection of captured Russian weaponry and uniforms was added in 1855 this exhibit attracted greater attention and was visited by Queen Victoria and Prince Albert. Among the more outlandish attractions were an Arctic exhibition featuring stuffed polar bears alongside a "living native of the Arctic regions", and the "Earthmen", a pair of pygmies from a tribe of Southern Africa that according to one hyperbolic advertisement "burrowed under the earth ... subsisting on insects and reptiles", but more reasonably were said to shelter in caves and hollows. Lectures on the exhibits and current events such as the Crimean War or the construction of the Panama Canal were held at regular intervals and "guides to knowledge" were positioned in the various galleries to assist and inform the visiting public.

== Competition, closure and demolition ==
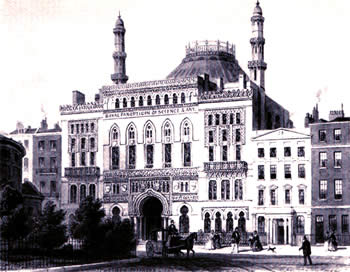
A near-neighbour and competitor: the Panopticon of Science and Art which opened in the square in 1854

Although Wyld undoubtedly recouped his investment within the first year of opening, over the remaining nine years of its existence the appeal of the Great Globe slowly waned. The attraction continued to draw crowds, but it was never as successful as in 1851 when the Great Exhibition had pulled visitors into the capital. By the mid-1850s the building was looking shabby and Wyld had been forced to start using it as a venue for variety shows. Competition came from Burford's Panorama in the north of the square which ran topical shows just as Wyld did – Burford ran a panorama show of Sevastopol at the same time as Wyld was exhibiting his model. Burford's Panorama was the oldest of its type in London, having been established in 1790, but there were many similar attractions in the capital, among them the Diorama and the Cyclorama in Regent's Park, the panoramas of "London by Day" and "Paris by Night" at the Colosseum, the dioramas at the Gallery of Illustration in Regent Street, and the Panorama of Paris and Versailles in the Linwood Gallery in Leicester Square.

The Panopticon of Science and Art, constructed in the square in 1854, also affected visitor numbers. The Panopticon was constructed by a consortium hoping to take advantage of the market for scientific and cultural attractions, but like the Great Globe it struggled to draw sufficient visitors. After two years the Panopticon closed down; it reopened shortly afterwards with the addition of a circus ring, but still proved to be uneconomical and quickly closed again. Renamed the Alhambra, it reopened as a theatre and music-hall in which form it endured until the 20th century.

In 1854, the Great Globe was enough in the public eye to inspire an entertainment by James Robinson Planché at the Haymarket: Mr Buckstone's Voyage Round the Globe, but by 1862, there was little question of it continuing to operate even if the Tulks had not been keen to exercise their option to buy. In 1861 in The Adventures of Philip, Thackeray noted that he had heard that the Globe was "coming to an end". The agreement with the Tulks expired in April 1862, and in the same month, Henry Webb threatened legal action because of Wyld's failure to remove the building and restore the gardens. Wyld was somewhat hamstrung as he had sold the building to William Wilde, the proprietor of the Alhambra, but Wilde had failed to pay and it took two court cases before Wyld regained possession in August. He immediately sold it to a contractor for demolition. In October the building was torn down and the globe itself broken up and sold for scrap. By November the site was completely cleared.

== Disposal ==
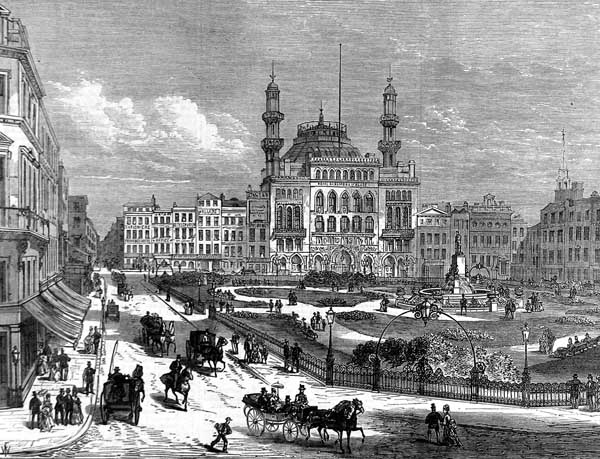
The gardens were finally redesigned in 1874, twelve years after the Great Globe closed and six years after Wyld sold his remaining interest.

Wyld's deal with the Tulks had included a promise to restore the gardens, but he showed no signs of making good on the agreement. Stripped of the buildings, the gardens quickly reverted to their former dilapidated state. Even before the globe was dismantled, the building and gardens had deteriorated to such a degree that, speaking in Parliament in July 1861, Lord Overstone commented that "in addition to the unsightliness of the structure that had been created in the centre, and the accumulation of everything that was filthy, unseemly, and improper which existed in the enclosure, scenes took place there at a late hour which were most discreditable to the Metropolis". The statue of George I was dug up and re-erected, but it had suffered from its ten years underground. The rider may have already been stolen and sold for scrap, and the horse quickly became a target for vandalism; the legs were removed and body was painted with black and white spots.

John Augustus Tulk, who had exercised his right to buy half the gardens, was keen to build on the land and proposed creating a covered market to encompass the square and the buildings he owned around it, but the judgement the Tulks had earlier won against Moxhay proved troublesome because it stipulated that the space must be kept as either a garden or a pleasure garden. Popular feeling was that the gardens should be preserved as an open space, and the bill put before Parliament for the establishment of "Regent Market" was rejected. Tulk attempted to sell his interest in the gardens to a speculator, J. L. Tabberner, but the long negotiations fell through when Tabberner's plans for the garden were rejected and he realized that the other half of the gardens were still owned by Wyld.

In January 1865, the Metropolitan Board of Works attempted to seize the gardens under the Town Gardens Protection Act 1863 in order to carry out remedial works. Despite the bill having been proposed precisely for the case of Leicester Square gardens, the attempted seizure was found to be unlawful, and the Board failed to get the decision reversed on appeal.

There were seven descendants of the other branch of the Tulk family that each had been entitled to buy a seventh share of Wyld's remaining half of the garden, and, although the option had expired in 1862, in August 1868 Wyld disposed of his share to them for £1,000. In 1869, Webb, not realising that Wyld had divested himself of his share, attempted to get an injunction to force Tulk and Wyld to restore the gardens, but his request was not granted. The fate of the gardens was finally resolved in 1874 when MP Albert Grant bought the square for £11,060, had it redesigned and donated it to the City of London.

== Legacy ==
Though there was little immediate interest in reviving Wyld's idea, the concept of a giant globe was not altogether forgotten. A slightly smaller convex globe, with a diameter of 12.73 metres (41.8 ft), featured at the Paris Exposition of 1889. Ideas for a gigantic globe at the World's Columbian Exposition in Chicago in 1893 were unrealistic – one was for an assembly hall for ten to fifteen thousand people inside a globe supported on the shoulders of a 450-foot-tall (140 m) giant, and another was for a globe so large that a lift would be needed to reach the equator and a journey on a specially constructed spiral railway required to reach the North Pole.

In 1897, the geographer Thomas Ruddiman Johnston proposed building another giant globe in London. His plan was for a more conventional convex representation of the Earth's topography which visitors could admire from a spiral walkway that would encircle the globe. On a scale of about 8 miles to the inch (roughly 5.2 kilometres to the centimetre), his globe would have been 84 feet (26 m) in diameter (almost 24 feet (7.3 m) larger than Wyld's). Although Ruddiman Johnston got as far as preparing some of the sections, the proposal ultimately came to nothing.

Élisée Reclus proposed building an even larger version for the 1900 Exposition Universelle in Paris, and plans for the construction were well advanced before the idea was scrapped. Reclus' Great Globe was to be 26 metres (85 ft) in diameter and feature a 1/500,000 scale globe, a planetarium and a panorama of human evolution. The Cosmorama, an only slightly less ambitious project was built for the Exposition. The Cosmorama, which was located near the foot of the Eiffel Tower, featured a 46-metre-diameter (151 ft) Celestial Sphere.

Paul Reclus, Élisée's nephew, worked with Sir Patrick Geddes on a globe project for the Outlook Tower in Edinburgh, but none of Geddes' ambitious plans were realised; Reclus produced a small model of what was called "The Hollow Globe" – a projection of what the earth would look like if it were transparent and viewed from the vantage point of the tower itself – and Geddes created a concave paper celestial sphere which a single person could enter.

It was not until 1935 that anything resembling Wyld's Globe was recreated. In 1930 Chester Lindsay Churchill was commissioned to design a new headquarters for the Christian Science Publishing Society. Within his design Churchill included the Mapparium, a giant ball with a concave projection of the Earth made up of 608 glass panels and spanned internally by a 30-foot (9.1 m) glass bridge. The Mapparium opened in July 1935 and by October of the same year had received 50,000 visitors.
