= Heysham (disambiguation) =

Heysham is a village in Lancashire, England.

Heysham may also refer to:

== Surname ==
- John Heysham
- Robert Heysham
- William Heysham
