= Hall of Commerce =

Former building in London, England

Coordinates: 51.514405°N 0.085603°W

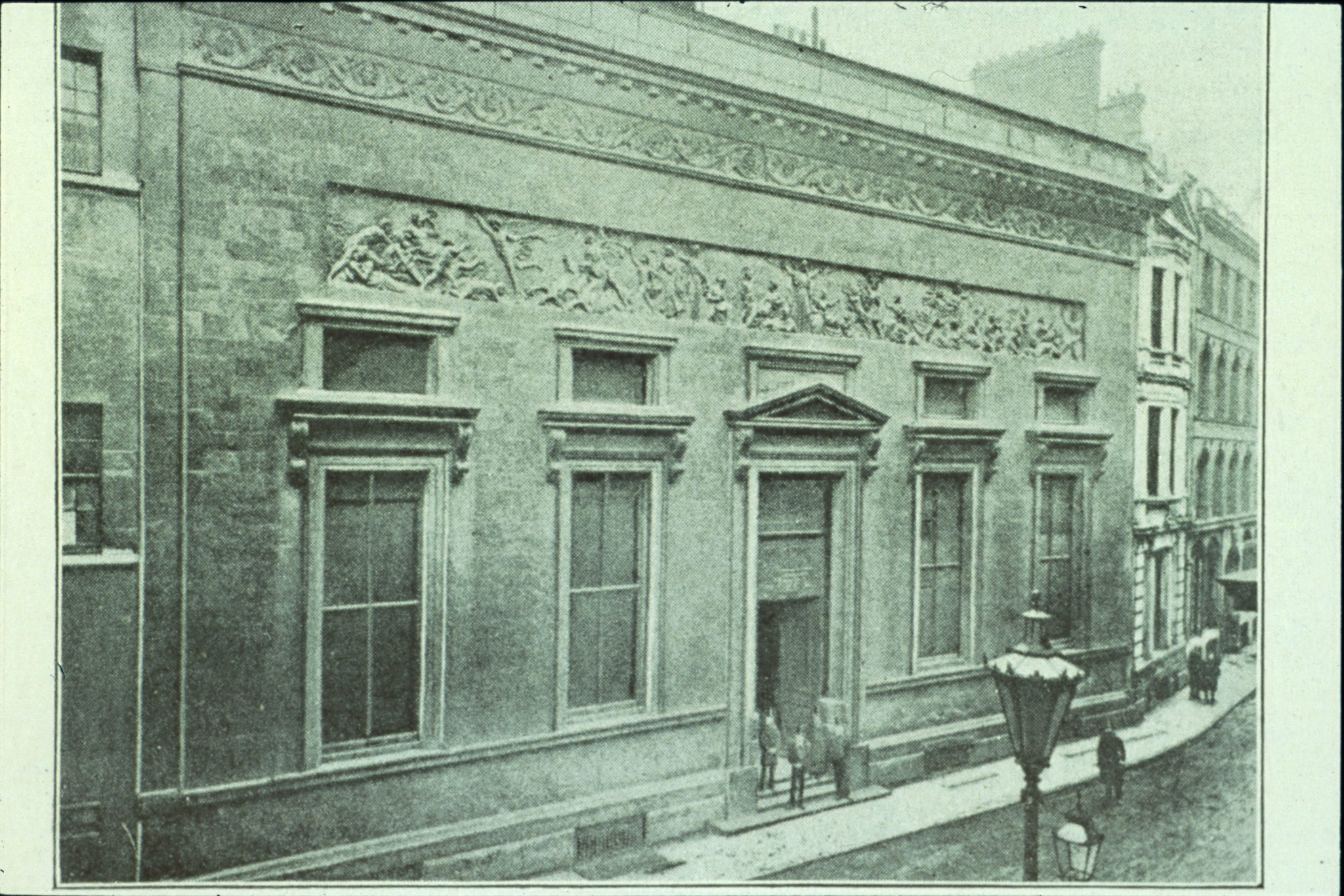
The Hall of Commerce in 1869, then a branch of Comptoir d’Escompte de Paris, a predecessor of BNP Paribas

The Hall of Commerce was a building on Threadneedle Street in the City of London, originally built as an exchange, before conversion to a bank and eventually being demolished in 1922.

== History ==
=== Construction ===
The building was devised by Edward Moxhay, a shoemaker and biscuit-baker, who created its French-inspired design himself, supposedly after a rejection of Moxhay's application to provide a new design for the Royal Exchange. Built between 1842 and 1844 on the site of the chapel of St. Anthony's Hospital, it was intended to rival the nearby Royal Exchange, but was not a success.

=== Conversion ===
The building was converted into a bank in 1855, and in 1867, the Comptoir d’Escompte de Paris, a predecessor of BNP Paribas opened its first bank in Britain within the building.

== Legacy ==
The frieze Commerce Welcoming All Nations by Musgrave Watson adorned the facade, and was preserved and moved to Napier Street in Islington following the building's demolition. The site is now occupied by the Grade II* listed former Westminster Bank building.
