= Musgrave Watson =

English sculptor

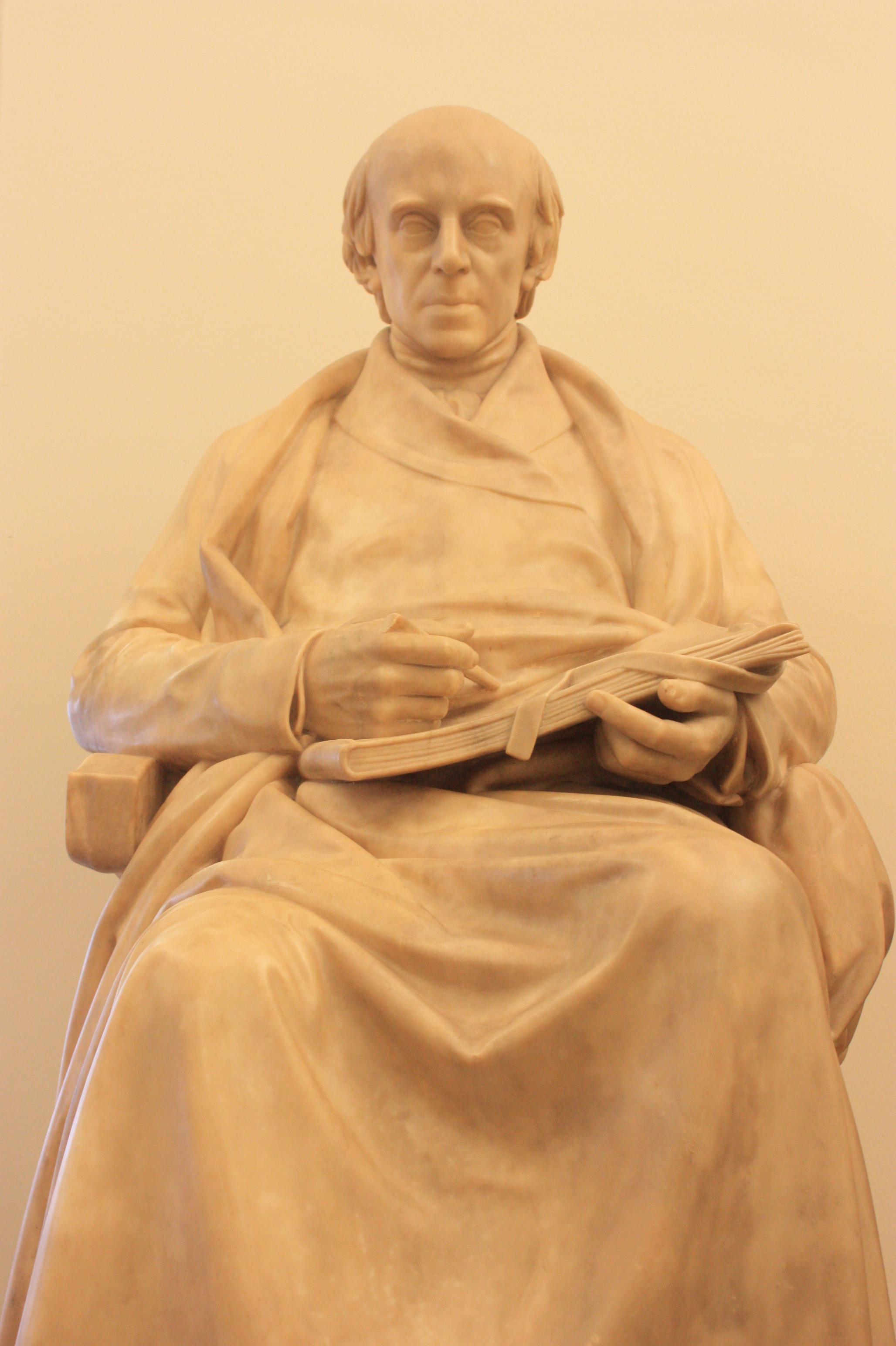
John Flaxman by Musgrave Watson, University College London

Musgrave Lewthwaite Watson (24 January 1804 – 28 October 1847) was an English sculptor of the early 19th century.

== Life ==
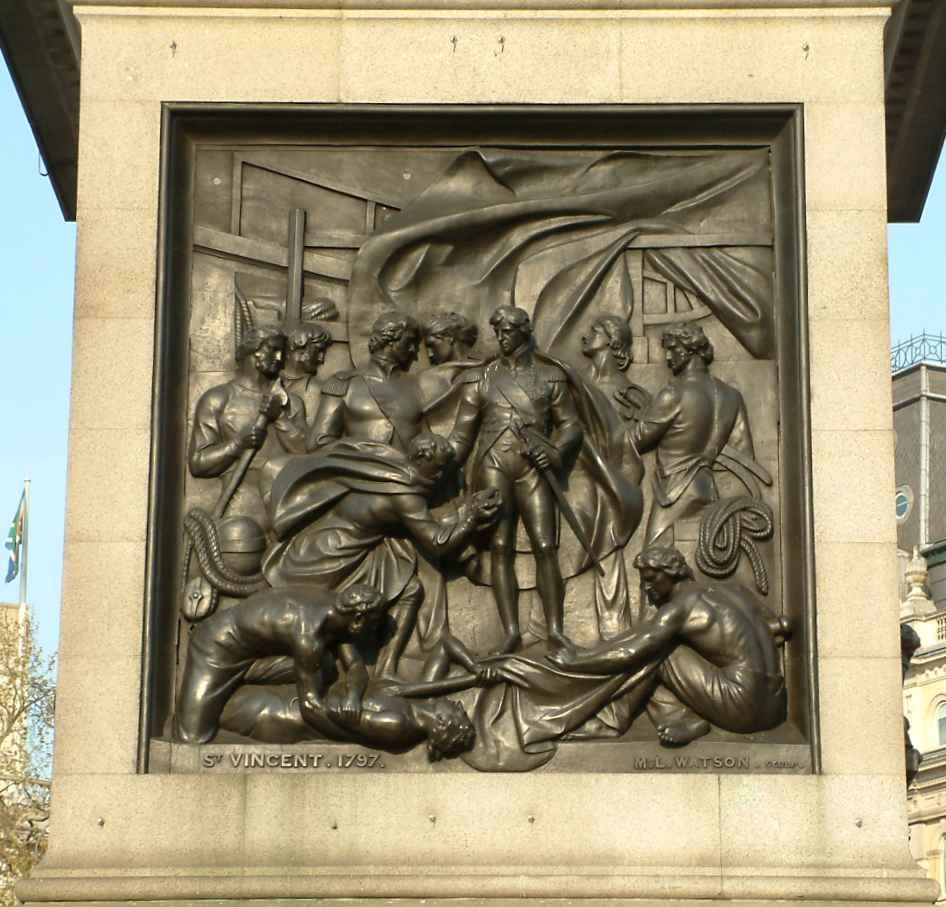
Watson's depiction of the Battle of Cape St Vincent on Nelson's Column.

Watson was born on 24 January 1804 the son of Thomas Watson of the Bogs, Sebergham, a farm near Carlisle in Cumberland, being christened on 8 March 1804 at Hawksdale, near Dalston. His father was a prosperous farmer, who also owned an iron-forge. Although he had artistic ambitions from an early age, at his parents' insistence he was articled to a solicitor in Carlisle in 1821. Following his fathers's death in 1823, he abandoned the legal profession and went to London to study sculpture. He took advice from John Flaxman, and studied under Robert William Sevier and at the Royal Academy. In 1825 he left for Rome. On his return in 1828 he was determined to set up as a sculptor on his own account, rather than work in another artist's studio. However financial difficulties forced him to seek employment with Sir Francis Chantrey. He argued with Chantrey and afterwards worked for Richard Westmacott, William Behnes and Edward Hodges Baily. According to his biographer, Henry Lonsdale, he then spent two years at the Coade Artificial Stone Works in Lambeth, where he modelled sculptures and friezes for both private and public buildings. The work was well paid, but he decided to leave and set up his own studio once more.

He fell into financial difficulties again, and in 1832 had his belongings distrained for rent. However, eventually circumstances improved: the stone frieze Commerce Welcoming All Nations for Edward Moxhay's Hall of Commerce in Threadneedle Street in the City of London, completed in 1842, brought him critical acclaim. Five and a half feet tall and seventy three feet long, it can now be seen in Battishill Street Gardens, Napier Terrace, Islington. (Note: An accompanying plaque reads: "The stone frieze was carved by Musgrave Watson in 1842 and formed part of a Hall of Commerce in Threadneedle Street until it was demolished in 1922. The stonework was salvaged by Sir Albert Richardson and remained in pieces at London University. In 1974 these were given to the Borough Architect who replaced the missing sections to make the frieze a feature in the new Battishill Gardens. The sculpture is an allegorical composition showing Commerce standing centrally with wings outstretched to welcome all nations. On the left hand side there is a lion and representations of Poetry, Music and Painting; then Enterprise guided by Genius with a group looking towards the Messenger of Peace and Glad Tidings. On the other side of Commerce is Peace and Bearers of Fruits of the Earth, then Navigation guided by Urania and others personifying Geography and Education. To the far right are people of other countries shackled and dejected looking imploringly towards Britannia holding a flag, symbolic of liberty and protection." The frieze was restored in 2024–25 by the Heritage of London Trust.) In the same year he received a lucrative commission from Lord Eldon for a marble double portrait of his grandfather, the first Lord Eldon, and his great-uncle, Baron Stowell. The commission had originally been given to Sir Francis Chantrey, who died before it could be carried out.

In 1839 Watson submitted designs to both competitions held by the Nelson Memorial Committee for a monument to be erected in Trafalgar Square. He was unsuccessful, but was later chosen to sculpt the relief panel of the Battle of Cape St. Vincent on the pedestal of the winning entry, William Railton's Nelson's Column. He was, however, unhappy with the terms of the commission, writing in a letter " I think the world will be disappointed with the relievi. The subjects are unfit for sculpture, or at least unfavourable." Watson died before the Cape St Vincent relief could be finished, having suffered from a persistent heart condition for most of his adult life. He also left the Eldon sculpture and a statue of John Flaxman to be completed by others. Just before his death he had most of the models in his studio destroyed.

He died of heart disease on 28 October 1847 at his home at 13 Upper Gloucester Place in London. He was buried on the western side of Highgate Cemetery. The grave (no.2444) has no headstone or marker.

== Recognition ==
A memorial to Musgrave Watson was erected in Carlisle Cathedral.

== Family ==
He lived with a young woman, the daughter of a publican in Carlisle, but never married her. It is unclear if he had children.

== Works ==
- Commerce Welcoming All Nations (1842), frieze for Edward Moxhay's now-demolished Hall of Commerce in the City of London; installed in Islington in 1975.
- Double portrait of brothers Lord Eldon and Lord Stowell at University College, Oxford (1842).
- Statue of Queen Elizabeth I for the Royal Exchange, London (1844).
- Marble statues of Major Francis Aglionby, MP for East Cumberland, (1843) and Lord Lonsdale (1845) in Carlisle.
- Statue of John Flaxman for University College London (1847).
- Pedimental sculpture for the Victoria Rooms in Bristol.

== Bibliography ==
- Lonsdale, Henry (1866). The Life and Works of Musgrave Lewthwaite Watson, Sculptor. London.
