= Joshua Milne =

English actuary (1776–1851)

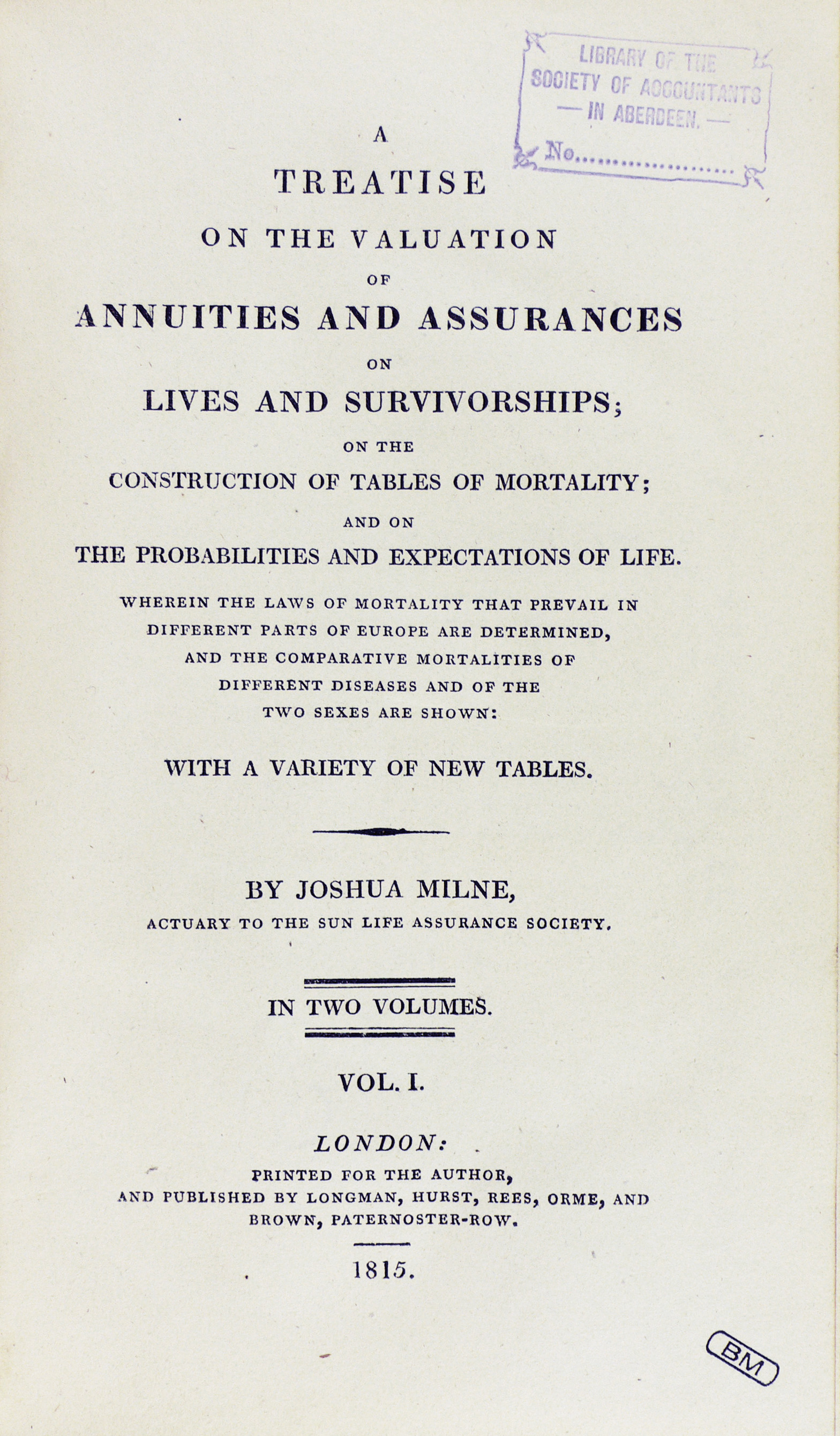
A treatise on the valuation of annuities, 1825.

Joshua Milne (1776–1851), was an English actuary.

== Life ==
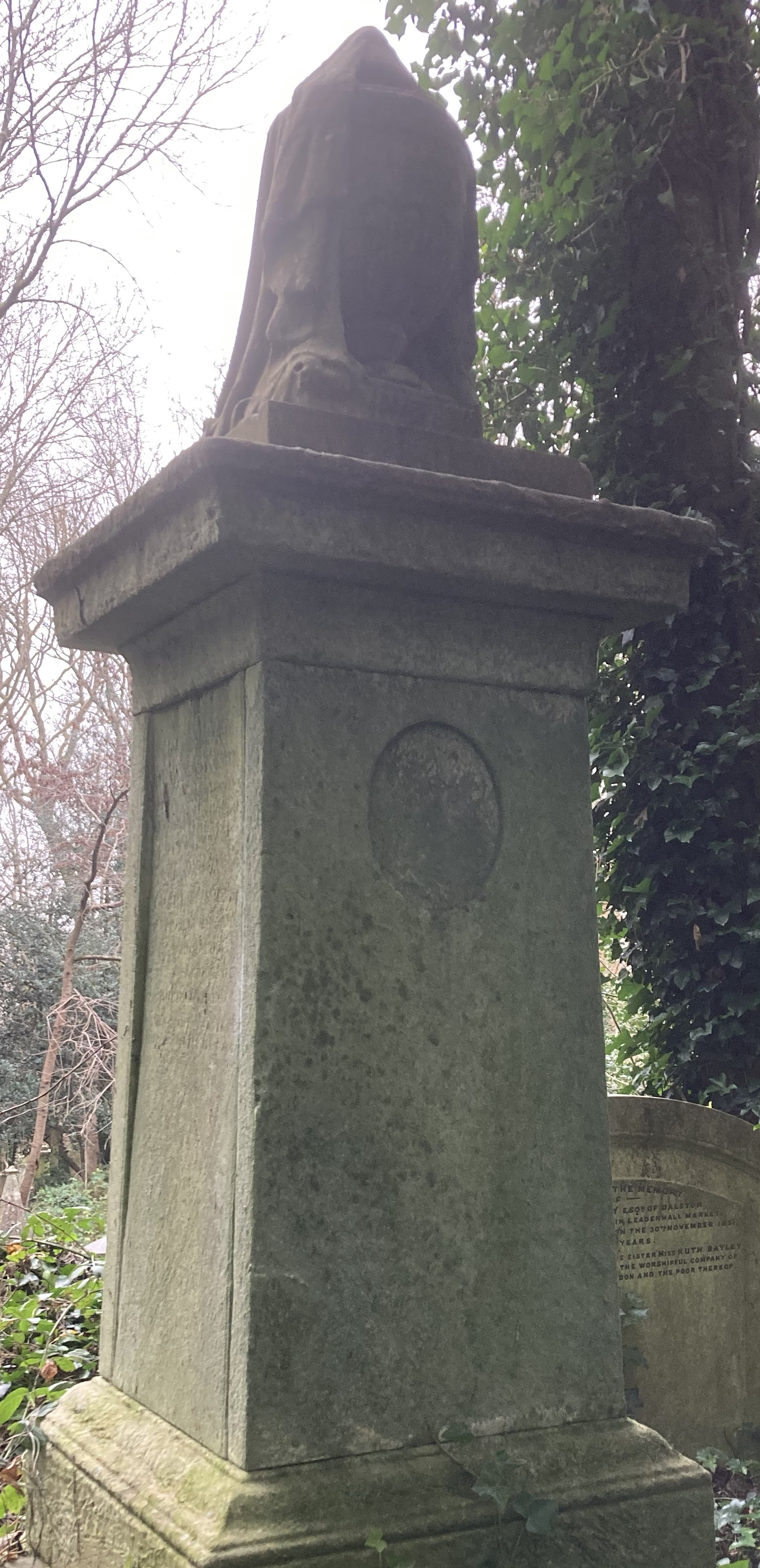
Grave of Joshua Milne in Highgate Cemetery

He was appointed actuary to the Sun Life Assurance Society on 15 June 1810, and reconstructed the life tables then in use. He gave evidence before the select committee on the laws respecting friendly societies (1825 and 1827).

By 1839 Milne had lost interest in the values of life contingencies, and turned to natural history; he is said to have possessed one of the best botanical libraries in London. He resigned his position in the Sun Life Office on 19 December 1843, and died at Upper Clapton on 4 January 1851. He was buried on the western side of Highgate Cemetery.

== Actuarial works ==
When Milne entered the field, life tables were based on the data taken by Richard Price from the burial registers (1735–80) of All Saints' Church, Northampton. Milne took as the basis of his calculations the bills of mortality from Carlisle, which had been prepared by John Heysham. After a long correspondence (12 September 1812 – 14 June 1814) with Heysham, he published his major work A Treatise on the Valuation of Annuities and Assurances (1815). Milne's new "Carlisle table" marked an epoch in actuarial science. Considering the narrow base of data from which he had to work, it was quite accurate, and was widely adopted by insurance societies. The Carlisle Table was largely superseded by that published by the Institute of Actuaries in 1870. But it was still considered useful in the early 20th century.

Subsequent writers built on Milne's work. He was the first to compute accurately, at the cost of heavy algebra, the value of fines (i.e. payments to be made at the successive deaths of persons). His notation for the expression of life contingencies suggested that of Augustus De Morgan in his Essay on Probabilities.

Milne also contributed to the Encyclopædia Britannica, fourth edition, articles on "Annuities", "Bills of Mortality", and "Law of Mortality".
