= Commerce Welcoming All Nations =

1842 stone frieze by Musgrave Watson

- The Benefits of Commerce "Hall of Commerce frieze"
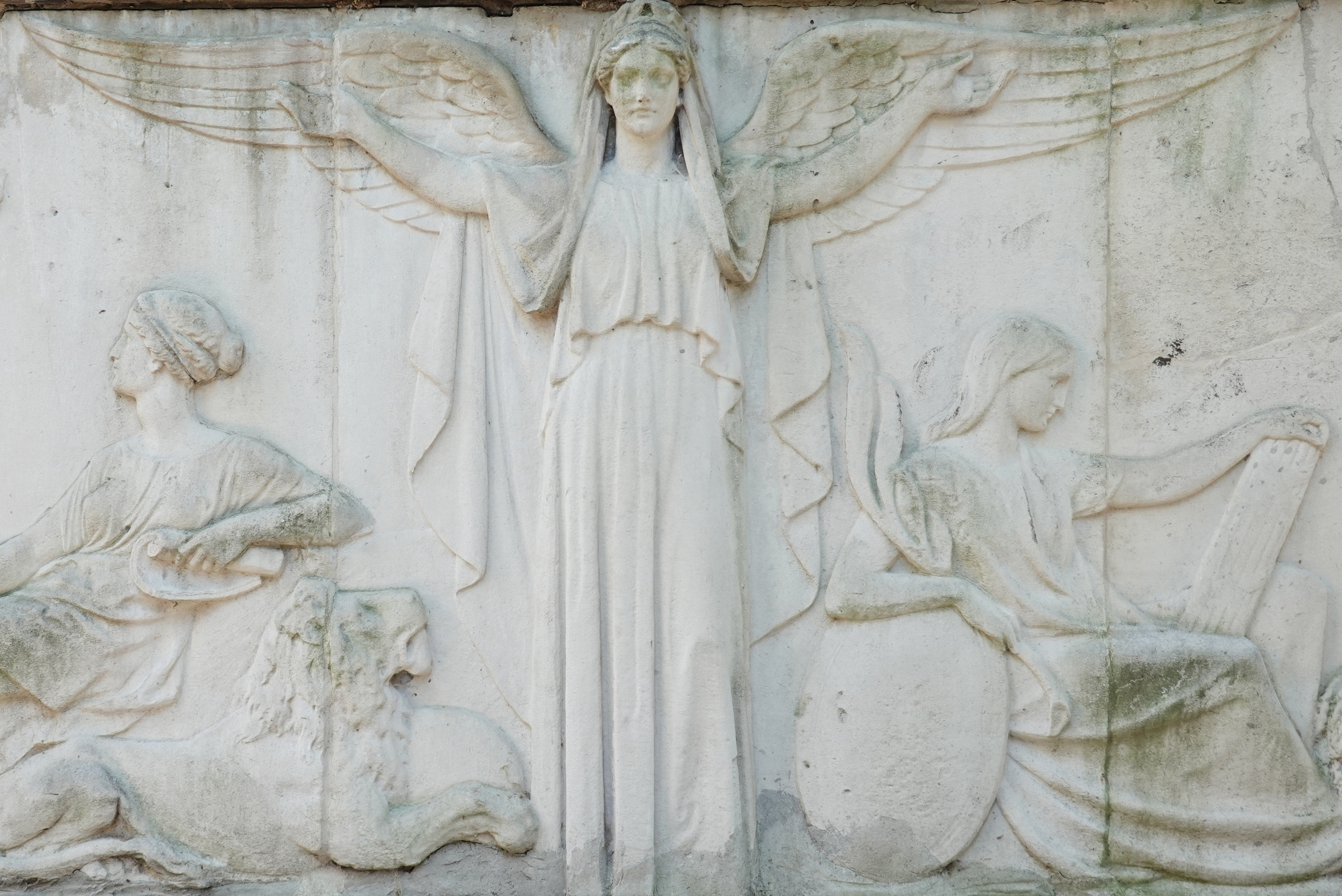
- Figure of Commerce
- Artist: Musgrave Watson
- Year: 1842
- Medium: Portland stone
- Subject: Allegorical
- Dimensions: 1.68 m × 22 m (5.5 ft × 73 ft)
- Location: Battishill Street Gardens, Napier Terrace, London; 51.539863°N 0.104145°W
- Owner: London Borough of Islington

Commerce Welcoming All Nations (Note: The frieze's title is unclear. Recent sources including Heritage of London Trust and Art UK refer to it as Commerce Welcoming All Nations. The record by the Public Monuments and Sculpture Association's 1991–2020 National Recording Project referred to both The Benefits of Commerce and The Benefice of Commerce, although the latter is probably a transcription error. Many other accounts do not give any title or simply refer to it as the "Hall of Commerce frieze".) is a monumental allegorical stone frieze by the English sculptor Musgrave Watson, best known for his bas-relief at the base of Nelson's Column. It is also known as The Benefits of Commerce and the "Hall of Commerce frieze". It was carved for the façade of the Hall of Commerce which opened in 1842 in the City of London. The Portland stone relief measures approximately 73 ft (22 m) in length and 5 ft 6 in (1.68 m) in height. It is generally regarded as Musgrave Watson's principal surviving architectural sculpture and the work that established his reputation as an independent sculptor.

Following the demolition of the Hall of Commerce in 1922, the frieze was salvaged and remained in storage for more than fifty years. It was reconstructed, and unveiled in Islington, London in 1975 by Sir John Betjeman. A major conservation programme was completed in 2025.

== The Hall of Commerce frieze ==
The ambitious Hall of Commerce building at 52 Threadneedle Street in the City of London was conceived by the entrepreneur and property developer Edward Moxhay after the destruction by fire of the second Royal Exchange in January 1838. Moxhay hoped to establish a permanent commercial institution that would serve London's merchants and rival, or even replace, the Royal Exchange. The construction of the building took place between about 1840 and 1843. The Hall occupied the site of the former French Protestant church in Threadneedle Street. Designed and erected by Moxhay himself after raising £70,000 from backers, the building contained two large Corinthian halls together with a reading room, exhibition space for commercial samples, rooms for meetings of creditors and private arbitrations, rooms for the deposit of deeds, and facilities for merchants' meetings and sales.

Moxhay commissioned a grand bas-relief frieze as the principal external sculptural ornament, which was executed on the front by Musgrave Watson, whom Peter Cunningham described as "a young sculptor of promise". According to Henry Lonsdale, the author of the 1866 biography of Watson, the commission represented a turning point in the sculptor's career. Watson was invited to produce a monumental allegorical composition illustrating "the blissful influences of commerce", allowing him an unusual degree of artistic independence. Lonsdale reproduces correspondence describing Watson's efforts to secure and execute the commission, presenting it as the sculptor's first major architectural work carried out entirely under his own direction. He was paid £500 for the work.

The relief was completed in 1842 and extended across nearly the entire façade of the building beneath the main cornice. In the interior of the Hall was another large bas-relief "picturesque" frieze by Watson, supposed by some to excel the exterior frieze, occupying the concavity of a dome-like structure but since lost.

The Hall enterprise proved commercially unsuccessful, and after Moxhay's death the building was adapted for banking use before ultimately being demolished in 1922.

== Description ==
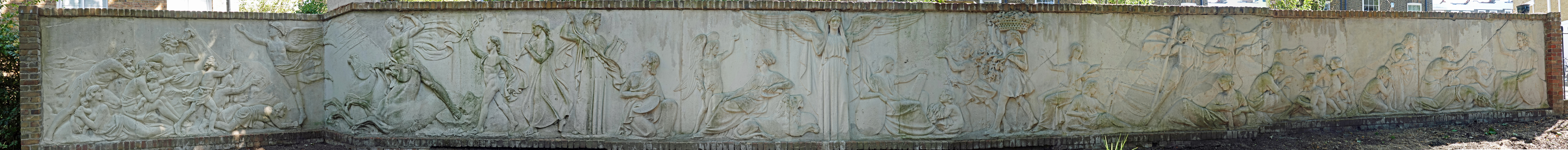
The frieze in Battishill Gardens, Islington
(image distortion is due to panel at left end being positioned during reconstruction at right angles to remainder of frieze, to fit available space)

At the centre of the frieze is the winged female personification of Commerce, shown with outstretched arms welcoming the nations of the world. The sculpture presents commerce not merely as a source of wealth but as the civilising force behind peace, education, health, navigation and the arts.

To the left are a lion; figures representing Poetry, Music, Painting and Hygieia, goddess of health; Enterprise guided by Genius; and a group looking towards the Messenger of Peace and Glad Tidings.

To the right are Peace; figures bearing the fruits of the earth; Navigation guided by Urania, the muse of astronomy; personifications of Geography and Education; and chained and dejected figures looking towards Britannia, who stands as a symbolic liberator holding a flag.

19th-century descriptions regarded the composition as illustrating the intellectual, artistic and material benefits produced by international commerce. An interpretation panel installed after the 2025 conservation project notes that the depiction of chained and shackled peoples also reflects Victorian imperial attitudes toward Britain's role in the world, and is now understood within the wider context of colonialism and empire.

== Contemporary reception ==
Contemporary writers described it as comprising life-sized figures in high relief and praised it as the principal external ornament of the Hall. An article in The Athenæum magazine noted, "While it cannot fail to attract notice, this very extensive piece of bas-relief, about seventy feet or upwards in length, will also bear critical examination as a work of art, and does honour to the talent and poetical fancy of its author, Mr. M. L. Watson". An unnamed "learned connoisseur of art", quoted by Lonsdale, wrote to Watson, "I have seen the basso-relievo in Threadneedle Street, and I think you need not fear success after this monument of your powers … I think your sculpture excellent and effective, and poetical; perhaps it is a little too real here and there, and too dramatic." A writer in Fraser's Magazine described Watson's work as "free, fanciful and poetic," and Lonsdale reported "this opinion pretty nearly expressed the general sentiment."

== Removal and reconstruction ==
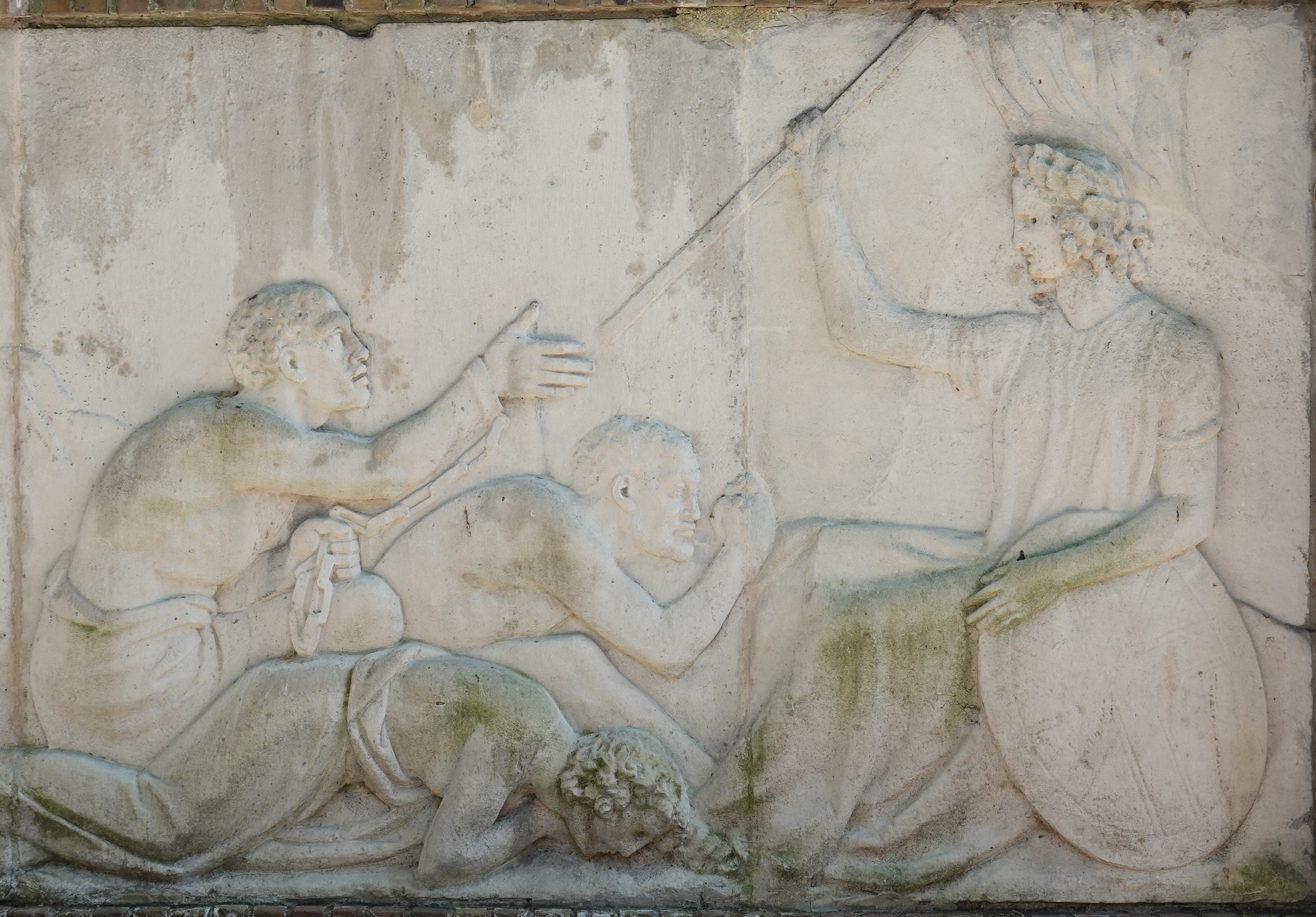
Chained and shackled figures look towards Britannia.

When the Hall of Commerce was demolished, the frieze was preserved rather than destroyed. The architect Sir Albert Richardson arranged for the surviving stones to be saved, after which they remained in storage at University College London for more than fifty years. In 1974 the fragments were transferred to the London Borough of Islington, where Borough Architect Alfred Head incorporated them into the design of the newly created Battishill Gardens housing development. Missing sections were reconstructed to allow the relief to be reassembled as a continuous monument.

The reconstructed frieze, with an explanatory panel, was unveiled on 30 June 1975 by the Poet Laureate Sir John Betjeman, a prominent advocate for the preservation of Victorian architecture and sculpture.

== Conservation ==
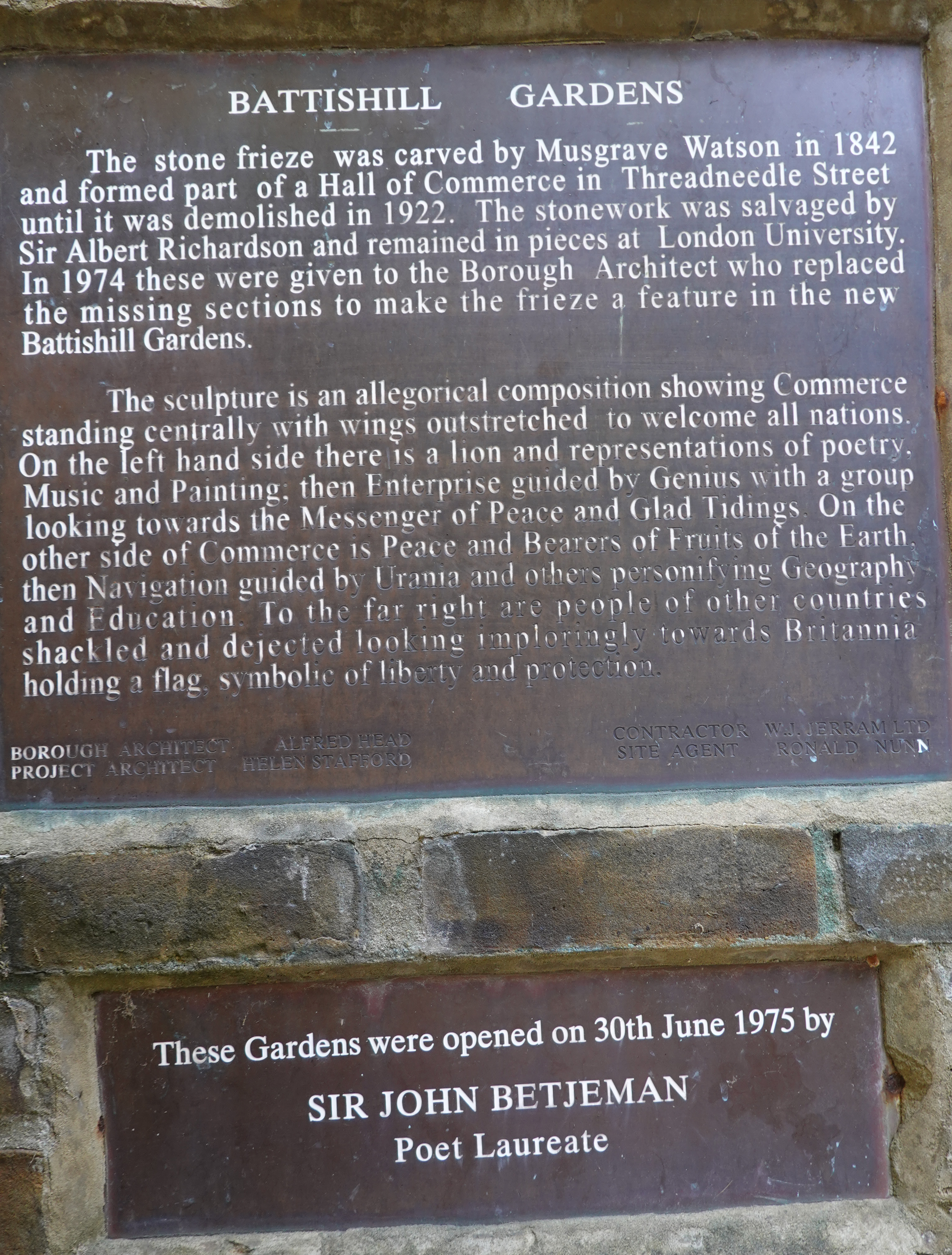
1975 interpretation panel

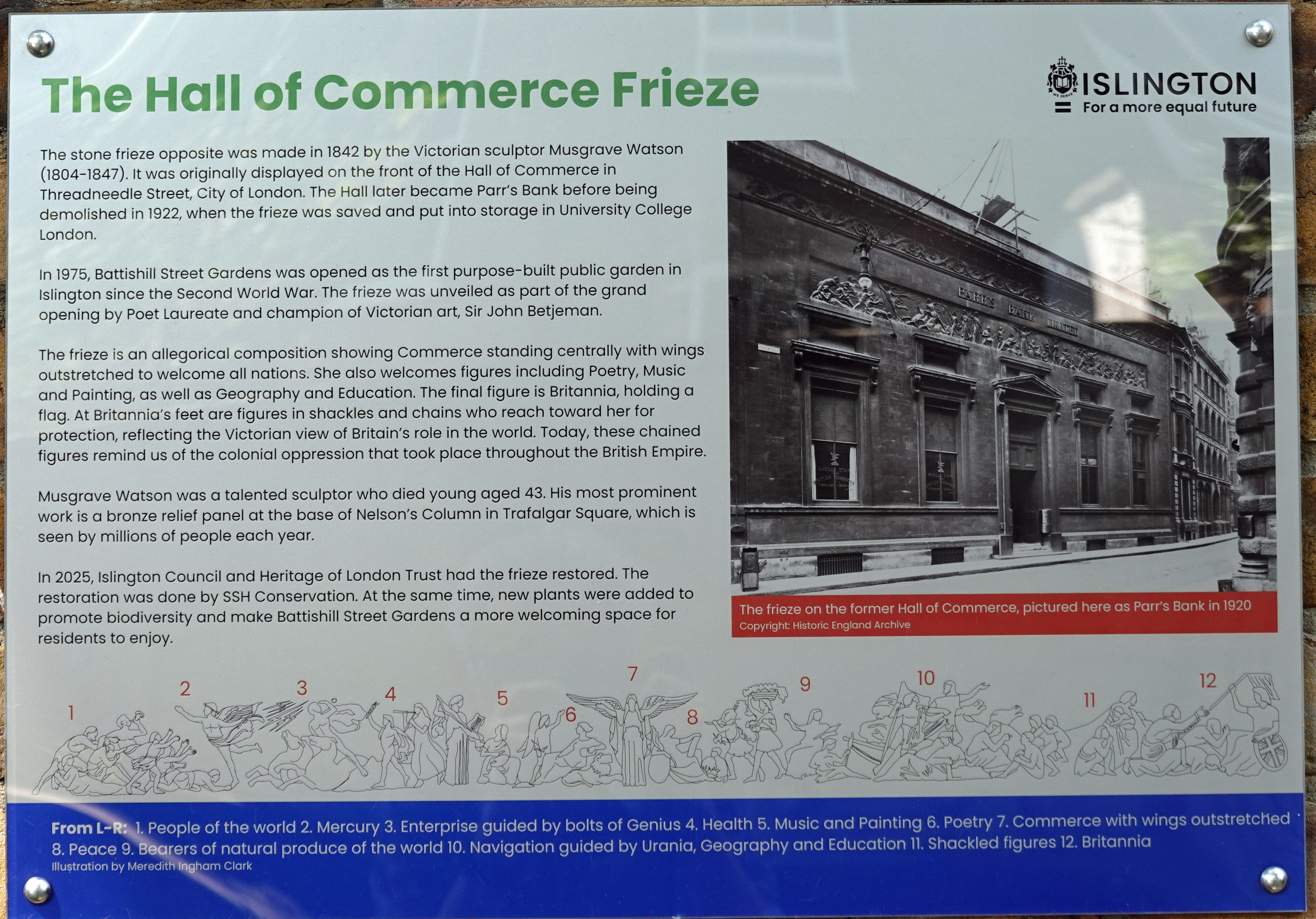
2025 interpretation panel

By the early 21st century the Portland stone was in poor condition, having deteriorated through weathering, inappropriate cement repairs and vegetation encroaching on the stonework. In 2024–25 Islington Council and the Heritage of London Trust, supported by the Jones Day Foundation, had the frieze restored: Sally Strachey Historic Conservation undertook a comprehensive programme of cleaning, grout and mortar repairs with a lime-based shelter coat on the whole frieze. The project also included landscaping improvements and a new interpretation panel explaining the historical context of the sculpture. The restored monument was formally presented in May 2025, coinciding with the fiftieth anniversary of its unveiling in Battishill Gardens.

== Artistic significance ==
Commerce Welcoming All Nations brought Watson critical acclaim after a period of financial difficulties, establishing his reputation as a sculptor of architectural decoration. The Dictionary of National Biography, 1885-1900 regarded it as one of his principal works. Lonsdale devotes an entire chapter of his biography of Watson to the commission, writing, "However imperfect Watson might consider his frieze to be—and he viewed it rather as a probationary study to the realization of something better and grander—it showed originality, large conception, and no small amount of classical feeling."

More recent assessments identify it as an early independent commission completed shortly before his greatest work, a colossal double portrait of brothers Lord Eldon and Lord Stowell for University College, Oxford. Modern reference works generally regard it as Watson's principal surviving architectural sculpture.

== Sources ==
- Art UK. "Commerce Welcoming All Nations". Public Catalogue Foundation.
- The Athenæum (9 July 1842). "Sculpture in Architectural Design". The Athenæum. No. 767. p. 612.
- Cunningham, Peter (1850). Hand-Book of London: Past and Present. London: John Murray. p. 220.
- Heritage of London Trust (2025). "Commerce Welcoming All Nations Frieze: Restoration of the frieze". Heritage of London Trust.
- London Remembers. "Battishill Gardens".
- Lonsdale, Henry (1866). "Chapter X: The Frieze in Threadneedle Street". The Life and Works of Musgrave Lewthwaite Watson, Sculptor. London: George Routledge and Sons. pp. 137–150.
- Mogg, Edward (1848). "The Universal Hall of Commerce". Mogg's New Picture of London, and Visitors' Guide to Its Sights (11 ed.). London: E. Mogg, no.14 Great Russell Street, Covent Garden. pp. 136–137.
- Nicholson, Albert. Dictionary of National Biography, 1885-1900/Watson, Musgrave Lewthwaite . Smith, Elder & Co. – via Wikisource.
- Public Monuments and Sculpture Association National Recording Project. "London, CLCOL/X56, The Benefits of Commerce, Frieze, Napier Terrace, Islington (Formerly Hall of Commerce) [also shown as "The Benefice … ", probably an error]". Archived from the original on 1 August 2011.
- Roscoe, Ingrid; Hardy, Emma; Sullivan, M. G., eds. (2009). A Biographical Dictionary of Sculptors in Britain, 1660-1851. The Association of Human Rights Institutes series. Yale University Press for the Paul Mellon Centre and Henry Moore Foundation. ISBN 9780300149654.
- Thornbury, Walter (1878). "Chapter XLVI: Threadneedle Street". Old and New London. Vol. 1. London: Cassell, Petter & Galpin.
- Timbs, John (1867). Curiosities of London: exhibiting the most rare and remarkable objects of interest in the metropolis; with nearly sixty years personal recollections. London: J. C. Hotten. pp. 425–426.
