= 250 City Road =

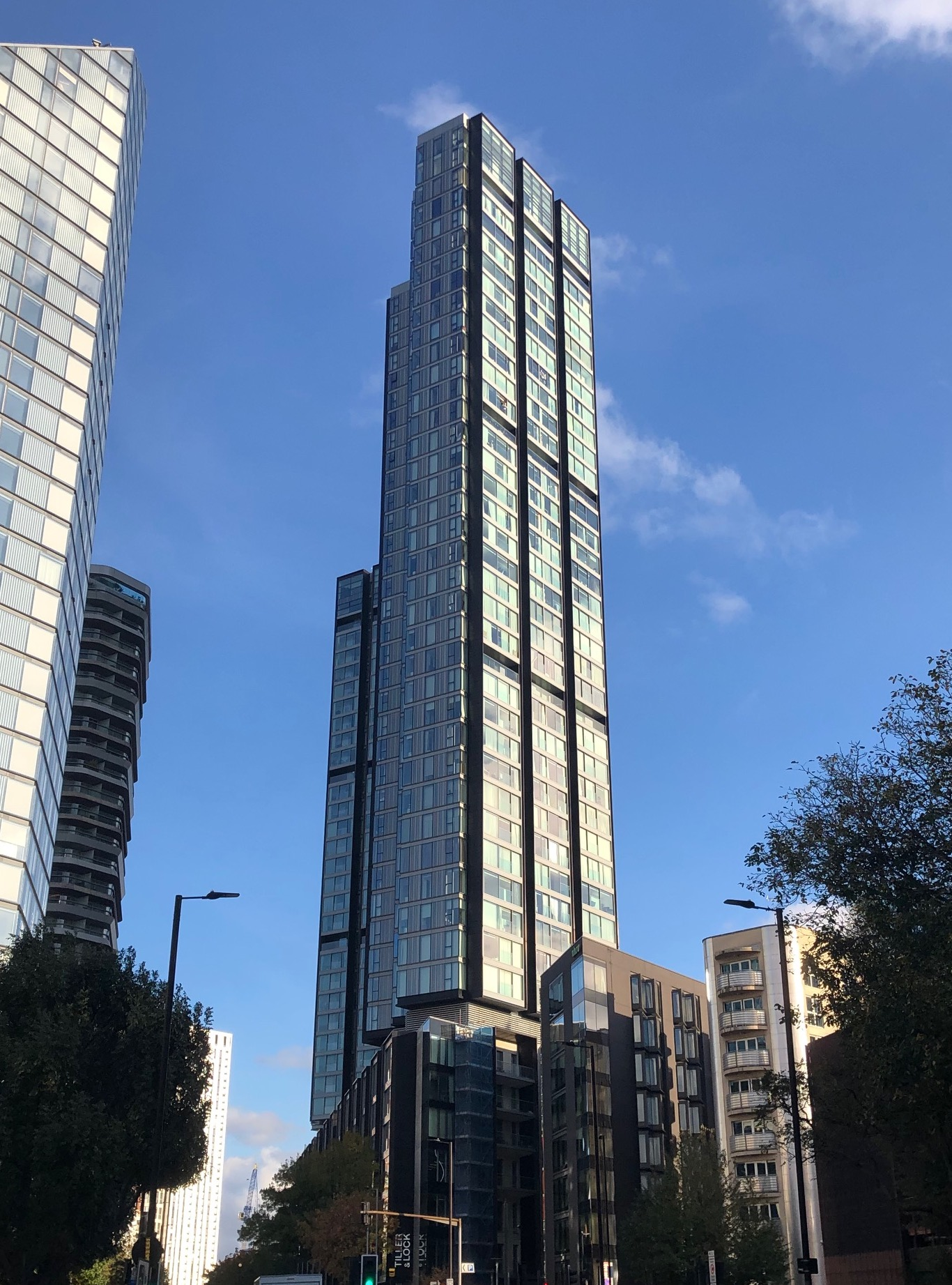
- 250 City Road, September 2020
- Interactive map of the 250 City Road area

General information
- Status: Under construction
- Type: Mixed-use
- Architectural style: Modern
- Location: 250 City Road, London, EC1, United Kingdom
- Coordinates: 51.5287°N 0.095736°W
- Construction started: 2015 (phase one)
- Opening: 2017 (phase one)
- Owner: Berkeley

Height
- Architectural: 150 m (492 ft)/137 m (449 ft)

Technical details
- Floor count: 42/36

Design and construction
- Architect: Foster + Partners

250 City Road is a mixed-use development on the City Road in the borough of Islington, London, designed by Foster + Partners and developed by Berkeley. It was given planning permission in 2014 by the then London Mayor Boris Johnson after being rejected by Islington Council.

Phase one started in 2015. The development has two towers of 43 and 36 storeys, 930 apartments and a 190-room hotel.

== Background ==
In 2011, developer Berkeley acquired the 1.9 hectare 250 City Road site, which had been a business park since the 1980s. The site came with planning permission, granted in 2010, for a new development designed by BUJ Architects. The proposal included a 27-storey tower, 700 homes, offices as well as retail and restaurant space. However, Berkeley started work on new plans in collaboration with architect firm DSDHA.

In 2012, architects Foster + Partners took over the design for the new scheme. In 2013, Berkeley applied for planning permission for the development but it was rejected by Islington Council. In December 2013, London Mayor at the time, Boris Johnson, reviewed the decision and gave the development approval in April 2014.

The proposals include two towers of 150 m (509 ft) and 137 m (449 ft) containing 42 and 36 floors, with the taller building named Carrara Tower, and the smaller named Valencia Tower. In total, the development will have 930 apartments as well as a 190-room hotel, office and retail space.

== Construction ==
Phase one of the development, which includes the construction of the tallest tower, began in March 2015 and was expected to be completed in December 2017.

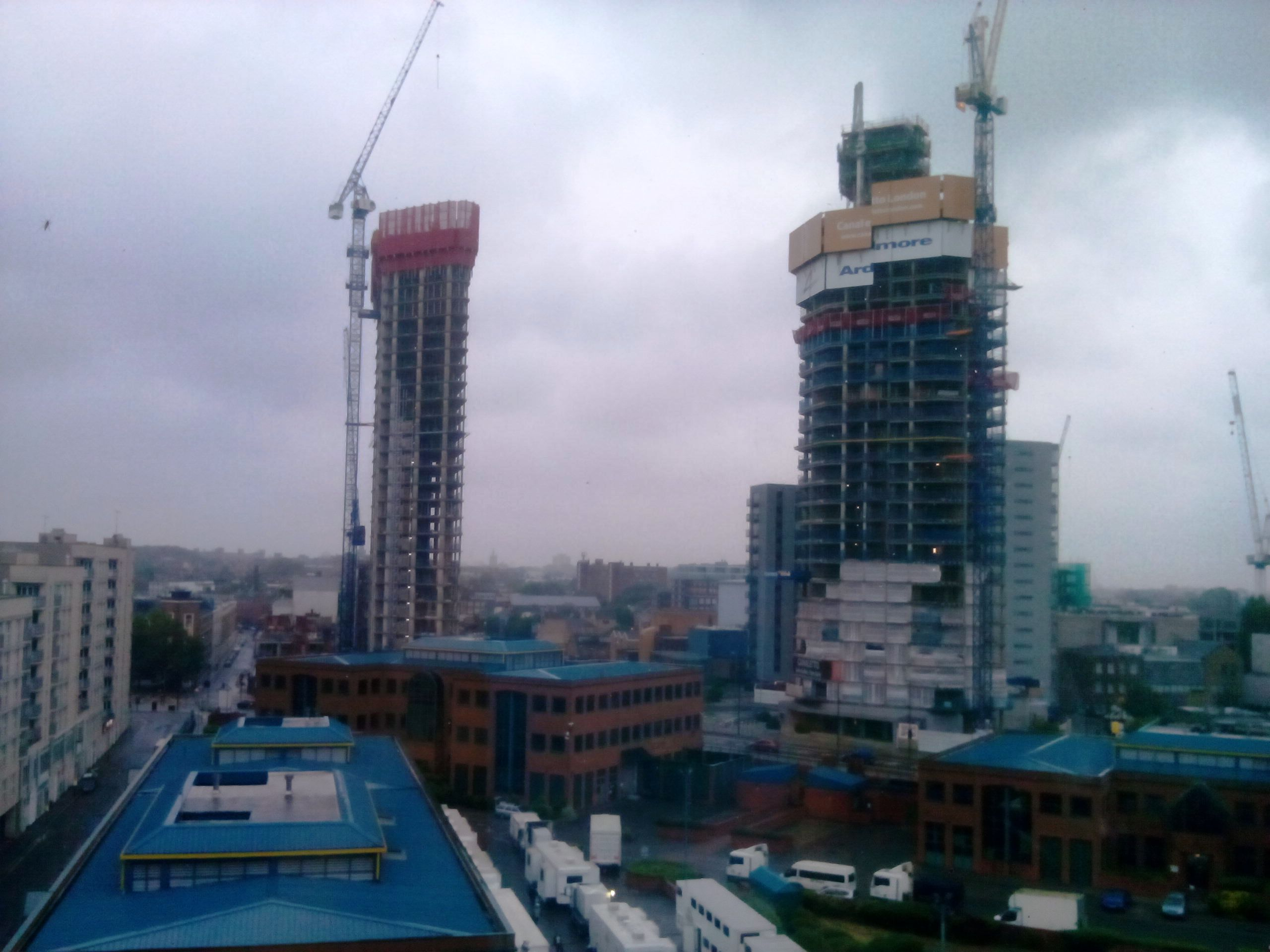
250 City Road site, August 2014

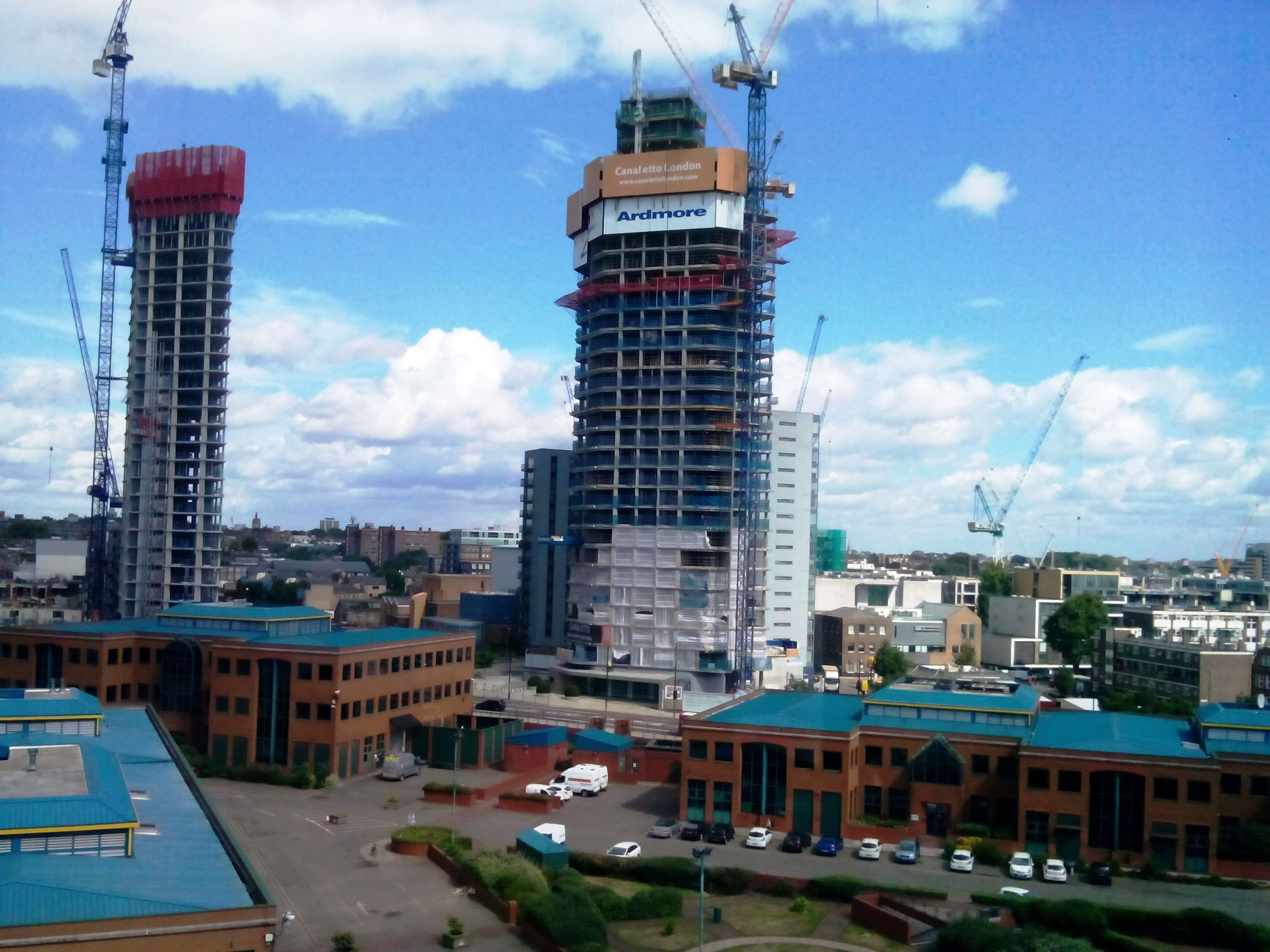
The site in 2014

== See also ==
- List of tallest buildings and structures in London
- List of tallest buildings in the United Kingdom
