= Henry Lonsdale =

English physician and biographer

Henry Lonsdale M.D. (1816–1876) was an English physician, now known as a biographer.

== Early life ==
Born in Carlisle, Cumberland, he was the son of Henry Lonsdale, a tradesman there. After attending a local school he was apprenticed in 1831 to Messrs. Anderson & Hodgson, medical practitioners in Carlisle. In 1834 he went to study medicine at Edinburgh, and was in his third year appointed assistant to Robert Knox the anatomist, and also to John Reid, the physiologist. He studied during the summer of 1838 in Paris, and in passing through London became a member of the Royal College of Surgeons and licentiate of the Society of Apothecaries.

== Physician ==
On his return to Edinburgh Lonsdale graduated M.D. In autumn 1838, overworked, he took temporary charge of a country practice at Raughton Head in Cumberland. He helped to found the Inglewood Agricultural Society, a monthly club, the first of its kind in the county. He also gave a course of popular lectures on science, and acquired the friendship of Susanna Blamire, whose poems he subsequently collected. In 1840 Lonsdale returned to Edinburgh and became a partner with his former principal Knox, giving a daily demonstration in anatomy in the class-room and managing the dissecting rooms.

In 1841 Lonsdale was admitted fellow of the Royal College of Physicians of Edinburgh. Soon after 1843 he was appointed a senior president of the Royal Medical Society. He was also for two sessions the senior president of the Hunterian Medical Society, and was at the same time senior president of the Anatomical and Physiological Society, which had been revived by Dr. Knox and himself. In 1841 he was appointed physician to the Royal Public Dispensary, where for the first time in Edinburgh he introduced the use of cod-liver oil. During the epidemic of relapsing fever in Edinburgh in 1843, he had charge of the largest outdoor district, and when his three assistants broke down did the work single-handed.

Bronchitis induced Lonsdale to return to Carlisle, where he settled in the autumn of 1845. In 1846 he was appointed physician to the Cumberland Infirmary, an office which he held for twenty-two years. To the deficiency of vegetable food after the potato blight of 1846, Lonsdale attributed scurvy, then prevailing in a district north of Carlisle; Robert Christison had assigned it to a defective supply of milk. The matter was debated in the Edinburgh Medical Journal. When in the winter of 1847–1848 a cholera pandemic seemed to be threatening, Lonsdale set on foot a sanitary association in Carlisle.

== Later life ==
In politics Lonsdale was a philosophical radical. He helped to collect subscriptions for the Expedition of the Thousand, and was the friend of Giuseppe Mazzini and Lajos Kossuth, as well as of Giuseppe Garibaldi. After his marriage in 1851 he mainly occupied himself in reading, travelling in southern and eastern Europe, interesting himself in Italian art and archæology, and collecting materials for the lives of eminent Cumbrians. He died on 23 July 1876, and was buried on the 27th in Stanwix churchyard.

== Works ==
Lonsdale's thesis, An experimental Inquiry into the nature of Hydrocyanic Acid, was printed in the Edinburgh Medical and Surgical Journal for 1839. At one of the monthly séances of the Royal College of Physicians of Edinburgh he read a paper "On the Terminal Loops of the Nerves in the Brain and Spinal Cord of Man". These loops, which he had discovered when examining an infant monstrosity, he exhibited under a microscope. The history of the case was recorded in the Edinburgh Medical and Surgical Journal for 1843. To the Royal Medical Society he made a contribution on "Diphtheria", mainly based on observations of the disease at Raughton Head. He contributed many articles to the Journal of Public Health, a London periodical supported by the early sanitary reformers. His report on the health of Carlisle was quoted in the House of Commons by Lord Morpeth. An essay which he wrote on the health of bakers was reprinted in Chambers's Journal.

Lonsdale's literary works were:

- A Biographical Sketch of William Blamire, M.P. for Cumberland, London, 1862; later reissued in vol. i. of the Worthies of Cumberland.
- The Life and Works of Musgrave Lewthwaite Watson the sculptor, 1866.
- The Worthies of Cumberland, 6 vols. 1867–75.
- A Biographical Memoir prefixed to the Anatomical Memoirs of his friend John Goodsir, Edinburgh, 1868.
- A Sketch of the Life and Writings of Robert Knox, the Anatomist, London, 1870, undertaken at the request of some Edinburgh friends.

Lonsdale also collected the Poetical Works of Susanna Blamire, which were published at Edinburgh under the editorship of Patrick Maxwell in 1842, and edited the Life of Dr. John Heysham of Carlisle, London, 1870.

== Family ==
Lonsdale married Eliza Indiana, only daughter of John Smith Bond of Rose Hill, near Carlisle, which subsequently became his own residence. He left three sons and three daughters.

== Notes ==
Attribution

This article incorporates text from a publication now in the public domain: Lee, Sidney, ed. (1893). "Lonsdale, Henry". Dictionary of National Biography. Vol. 34. London: Smith, Elder & Co.
