= Tulk v Moxhay =

English land law case

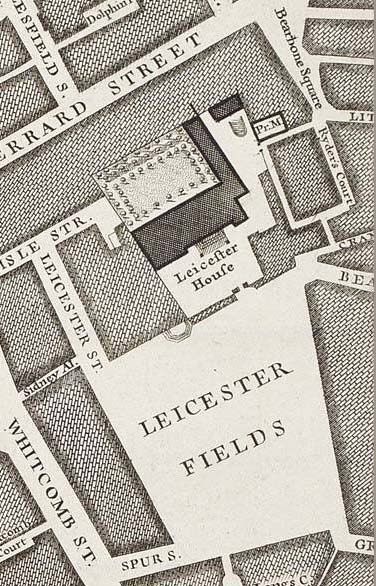
- Court: Court of Chancery
- Decided: 22 December 1848
- Citations: [1848] EWHC Ch J34 (1848) 41 ER 1143
- Transcript: None published. Court-authorised law report issued.

Case history
- Prior action: Prohibitory injunction granted by the Master of the Rolls (Under the cited case the Lord Chancellor refused a motion to dismiss the injunction)

Court membership
- Judges sitting: Lord Cottenham, Lord Chancellor of England and Wales (1836–1841 and 1846–1850)

Keywords
- Restrictive covenant

Tulk v Moxhay is a landmark English land law case which decided that in certain cases a restrictive covenant can "run with the land" (i.e. a future owner will be subject to the restriction) in equity. It is the reason that Leicester Square exists today.

On the face of it disavowing that covenants can "run with the land" so as to avoid the strict common law's former definition of "running with the land", the case has been explained by the Supreme Court of Canada in 1950 as meaning that "covenants enforceable under the rule of Tulk v Moxhay ... are properly conceived as running with the land in equity"; the Canadian court's wording summarises how the case has been interpreted and applied in decisions across common law jurisdictions.

== Facts ==
In 1808, Charles Augustus Tulk, the owner of several parcels of land in Leicester Square in central London, sold one of the plots to another person, who made a covenant to keep the Garden Square "uncovered with buildings" such that it would remain a pleasure ground. Over the following years the land was sold several times over (passed through successive owners), eventually to the defendant, Edward Moxhay, in a contract which did not recite (nor expressly stipulate) the covenant.

The defendant, who was aware (i.e. had actual or constructive knowledge) of the covenant at the time of purchase, refused to abide by the covenant as he claimed he was not in privity of contract and so was not bound by it.

== Judgment ==
Lord Cottenham LC found in favour of the plaintiff and granted an injunction to restrain the defendant from violating the covenant. The Court noted that if the agreement had been a contract instead of a covenant, it would have been enforceable. Therefore the covenant was enforceable at equity, that is, when the plaintiff seeks an injunction as opposed to damages. The case stands for the proposition that a vertical (landlord-tenant) relation (privity of estate) is not needed for the burden of a covenant to run at equity.

That this Court has jurisdiction to enforce a contract between the owner of land and his neighbour purchasing part of it, that the latter shall either use or abstain from using land purchased in a particular way, is what I never knew disputed ...

It is said that, the covenant being one which does not run with the land, this court cannot enforce it, but the question is not whether the covenant runs with the land, but whether a party shall be permitted to use the land in a manner inconsistent with the contract entered into by his vendor, with notice of which he purchased. Of course, the price would be affected by the covenant, and nothing could be more inequitable than that the original purchaser should be able to sell the property the next day for a greater price, in consideration of the assignee being allowed to escape from the liability which he had himself undertaken ...

That the question does not depend on whether the covenant runs with the land is evident from this, that if there was a mere assignment and no covenant, this Court would enforce it against a party purchasing with notice of it; for if an equity is attached to the property by the owner, no one purchasing with notice of that equity can stand in a different situation from the party from whom he purchased.

The case approved earlier decisions of the Vice-Chancellor, Whatman v. Gibson 9 Sim. 196 and Schreiber v. Creed 10 Sim. 35.

== Significance ==
Prior to this case, for covenants to run, that is for the covenantee to take enforcement action or obtain damages against a breach, the breach and the covenant had to be one of two classes:

1. Be a breach by one of the original parties of a conveyance of the freehold (or the other estates that existed in land at the time, apart from leasehold) and the parties remain the owner of at least part of the same estates at the time that the suit (today normally termed action or proceedings) is brought; this is known as having privity of contract and of estate.
2. Be a breach of a covenant imposed by a landlord against a tenant at the time of the original lease, which is known as having "vertical privity". In this type of privity, the covenants may be positive or negative and, unless very inequitable, are generally held to be binding.

After the case, instead of the first narrow privity of estate, any restrictive covenant chiefly needed to satisfy four lesser requirements to bind the successors in title:

1. The covenant must be restrictive.
2. At the date of the covenant, the covenantee owned land that was benefited by the covenant.
3. The original parties intended the burden to run with the land to bind successors.
4. The covenantor must take with notice of the covenant.

The old vertical privity rules remain (as later slightly amended) in respect of positive covenants (stipulations requiring someone to do an action).

The extent of the rule was described in 1950 by Justice Rand of the Supreme Court of Canada in Noble v Alley as follows:

Covenants enforceable under the rule of Tulk v Moxhay ... are properly conceived as running with the land in equity and, by reason of their enforceability, as constituting an equitable servitude or burden on the servient land. The essence of such an incident is that it should touch or concern the land as contradistinguished from a collateral effect. In that sense, it is a relation between parcels, annexed to them and, subject to the equitable rule of notice, passing with them both as to benefit and burden in transmissions by operation of law as well as by act of the parties.

The next paragraph distinguished from any application to the terms and circumstances of the covenant in question in that case:

But by its language, the covenant here is directed not to the land or to some mode of its use, but to transfer by act of the purchaser; its scope does not purport to extend to a transmission by law to a person within the banned class. If, for instance, the grantee married a member of that class, it is not suggested that the ordinary inheritance by a child of the union would be affected. Not only, then, it is not a covenant touching or concerning the land, but by its own terms it fails in annexation to the land. The respondent owners are, therefore, without any right against the proposed vendor.

== See also ==
- English land law
- English property law
- Halsall v Brizell [1957] Ch 169
- Precedent
- Equity (law)
- Earl of Oxford's case (1615)
- Judicature Acts (1873–1899)
