= John Heysham =

English physician and statistician

John Heysham M.D. (1753–1834) was an English medical doctor, now remembered as a statistician.

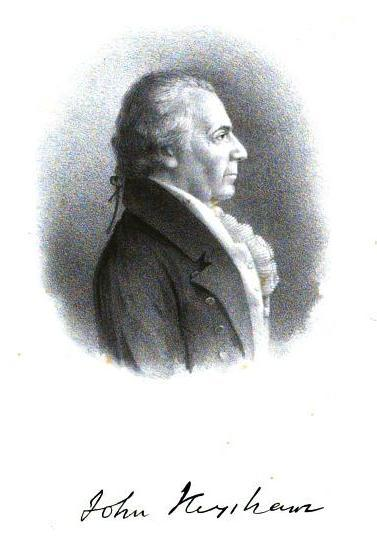
John Heysham

== Life ==
Born at Lancaster on 22 November 1753, he was the son of John Heysham, shipowner, by Anne Cumming, the daughter of a Westmoreland farmer. He was educated at a school kept by Quakers at Yealand, near Burton, Westmorland, and then apprenticed for five years to a surgeon at Burton. In 1774 he joined the medical classes at Edinburgh, and graduated M.D. in 1777.

In 1778 Heysham settled in practice at Carlisle, Cumberland and resided there until his death on 23 March 1834. He was buried in St. Mary's Church, and a memorial window was placed at the east end of the south aisle of the cathedral.

Heysham's practice was a modest financial success. With the help of the dean and chapter he established the first dispensary for the poor at Carlisle. A strong Tory and supporter of the Lonsdale family most of his life, he joined the reform movement in 1832. A biography was written by Henry Lonsdale.

== Works ==
Heysham's thesis was De rabie canina. He published also An Account of the Jail Fever at Carlisle in 1781 (London, 1782).

In 1779 Heysham began a series of statistical observations, by which he is now best known. They comprised a record of the annual births, marriages, diseases, and deaths in Carlisle for ten years (to 1788), including a census of the inhabitants in 1780, and again in 1788. These statistics, which were published with remarks on them at Carlisle in 1797, were used in 1815 by Joshua Milne, actuary of the Sun Life Assurance Office, as the basis of a well-known life table, the "Carlisle Table". It appeared in Milne's Treatise on the Valuation of Annuities and Assurances on Lives and Survivorships vol. I. The table was still relied upon in 1851, for the Institute of Actuaries benchmark published by Peter Gray, William Orchard and Henry Ambrose Smith. The Institute's revision of 1870 caused the obsolescence of the table.

Heysham was also a naturalist, his observations on the flora and fauna of his district being recorded in William Hutchinson's History of the County of Cumberland. He was close to the Carlisle Cathedral chapter, and was thought to have assisted Archdeacon William Paley on questions of design in nature.

== Notes ==
Attribution

This article incorporates text from a publication now in the public domain: Stephen, Leslie; Lee, Sidney, eds. (1891). "Heysham, John". Dictionary of National Biography. Vol. 26. London: Smith, Elder & Co.
