= William Heysham =

English cricketer and barrister

Personal information
- Full name: William Nunez Heysham
- Born: 19 July 1828; Marylebone, Middlesex, England
- Died: 12 December 1905 (aged 77); Paddington, London, England
- Batting: Unknown

Career statistics
Competition	First-class
Matches	1
Runs scored	22
Batting average	11.00
100s/50s	–/–
Top score	13
Catches/stumpings	–/–
- Source: Cricinfo, 2 October 2018

William Nunez Heysham (19 July 1828 – 12 December 1905) was an English first-class cricketer and barrister.

== Biography ==
Coat of Arms of William Heysham

Heysham was born at Marylebone in July 1828, son of William Henry Heysham. He studied law at Trinity College, Oxford. He was a student at the Inner Temple, from where he was called to the bar in June 1853. He made a single appearance in first-class cricket in 1855 for the Surrey Club against the Marylebone Cricket Club at Lord's. He batted in both Surrey Club innings', being dismissed for 9 by Jemmy Dean in their first-innings, while in their second-innings he was dismissed by the same bowler for 13. He died at Paddington in December 1905.
