= Edward Moxhay =

Victorian shoemaker, biscuit maker

- Born: 8 June 1787; Exeter, Devon
- Died: 19 March 1849 (aged 61); Stamford Hill, London

Edward Moxhay (1787–1849) was a Victorian shoemaker, biscuit maker and property speculator, best known for his involvement in a landmark English land law case that decided that in certain cases a covenant can "run with the land".

== Early life and career ==
Edward Moxhay was born on St David's Hill, Exeter on 8 June 1787, one of seven children of humble parents, Richard Moxhay and Mary Potter. His elder brother Richard Hellings Moxhay was a talented organist and pianist who became a professor of music. Initially Edward followed his father's profession of shoemaker, completing his training in London and, after working for some of the best shoe and bootmakers, around 1810 he took the position of foreman with the firm of Walter and Gresham, leather cutters of Cannon Street. In 1812 he married Phebe Peapes White, the daughter of a Norfolk builder, and started in business on his own in London Wall, later moving to Great Winchester Street and finally to well situated premises at 55 Threadneedle Street. Through hard work and perseverance he prospered, particularly by exporting to the West Indies, and the family was able to move their residence from Threadneedle Street to a substantial house and grounds in Stamford Hill, now a suburb of London, but then in the countryside. There they entertained people of education and taste and Moxhay developed an interest in the arts and a talent for architecture. With the profits from his shoemaking business he acquired several leases of houses in the Austin Friars and Broad Street areas which he improved and let profitably as offices, which in turn led to commissions to improve the premises of several City companies. In the early 1820s, becoming concerned that his shoe-making business was over-reliant on exports, he took the unusual step of switching his Threadneedle Street premises to biscuit baking, in competition with the celebrated biscuit maker Leman in the same street. He made a success of this business too and, after forays in the risky shipping world, returned to property speculation.

== Tulk v Moxhay ==
The Tulk family had acquired the gardens in the centre of Leicester Square in the eighteenth century with a legal agreement that they had an obligation to maintain the gardens "uncovered by any buildings" and in 1808 Charles Augustus Tulk, foolishly sold the gardens to a local dentist, Charles Elms for £210 passing on this obligation. Elms subsequently sold to Robert Barren, who later sold to John Inderwick. When Moxhay bought the gardens in 1839 he was an established speculative builder, so clearly had development in mind, and being unable to remove this restrictive covenant chose to ignore it. After four years of legal wrangling, in 1848 Moxhay paid Barren's widow £120 to release Inderwick from the covenant and the freehold of the garden was finally conveyed by Inderwick to Moxhay without any obligation to maintain it or even to keep it "uncovered with any buildings". Moxhay immediately started felling the square's trees and in October 1848 Charles Augustus Tulk, whose folly in selling the garden for £210 forty years earlier was the main cause of this deplorable state of affairs, sought an injunction in Chancery to restrain Moxhay from despoiling the square or building on the garden. Moxhay argued that nearby development had made the square "entirely dependent for its prosperity upon trade and commerce" and that the residents no longer used the garden, which had become an unsightly disgrace to the neighbourhood, though he admitted that he had considered erecting a bazaar in the garden as early as 1845. In December 1848 the Master of the Rolls made an order restraining Moxhay from using the garden in any way which "might be inconsistent with the use of it as an open garden and pleasure ground", and this decision was subsequently upheld by the Lord Chancellor. This legal decision, Tulk v Moxhay, has become a landmark case in establishing that covenants bind subsequent owners of land.

== Hall of Commerce ==
In 1830 Moxhay embarked on his least successful speculation. In 1829 the site of the former French Protestant Church at 52 Threadneedle Street became available following its demolition to make way for the widening of the street by the City Corporation. Moxhay bought the site and with backers spent £70,000 building a "Hall of Commerce" to his own design. The enormous hall was intended as a meeting place where commercial news could be exchanged, it was a predecessor of the more successful Royal Exchange which opened in 1844. Apart from the grand hall, there was a reading room, a room where commission agents could exhibit their samples, rooms for meetings of creditors and private arbitrations and rooms for the deposit of deeds. But the venture was a financial failure and Moxhay and his backers were forced to reduce the annual subscription from £5 5s. to £1 10s. 6d. From 1855 the building was occupied by a series of banks until its demolition in 1922. Its striking frieze Commerce Welcoming All Nations by the sculptor Musgrave Watson (1804–1847), best known for his bas-relief at the base of Nelson's Column, was saved and relocated to Islington, where it can be seen to this day. (Note: An accompanying plaque reads: "The stone frieze was carved by Musgrave Watson in 1842 and formed part of a Hall of Commerce in Threadneedle Street until it was demolished in 1922. The stonework was salvaged by Sir Albert Richardson and remained in pieces at London University. In 1974 these were given to the Borough Architect who replaced the missing sections to make the frieze a feature in the new Battishill Gardens. The sculpture is an allegorical composition showing Commerce standing centrally with wings outstretched to welcome all nations. On the left hand side there is a lion and representations of Poetry, Music and Painting; then Enterprise guided by Genius with a group looking towards the Messenger of Peace and Glad Tidings. On the other side of Commerce is Peace and Bearers of Fruits of the Earth, then Navigation guided by Urania and others personifying Geography and Education. To the far right are people of other countries shackled and dejected looking imploringly towards Britannia holding a flag, symbolic of liberty and protection." The frieze was restored in 2024–25 by the Heritage of London Trust.)

== Death ==
The death of his son Charles at Torquay in 1847, combined with his heavy losses from the failure of the Hall of Commerce, blighted the final years of Moxhay's life and it was said that he would spend many hours wandering in Epping Forest dreaming up unrealisable, grandiose schemes. He died heavily in debt at his Stamford Hill home on 19 March 1849 and is buried on the west side of Highgate Cemetery.

== Gallery ==
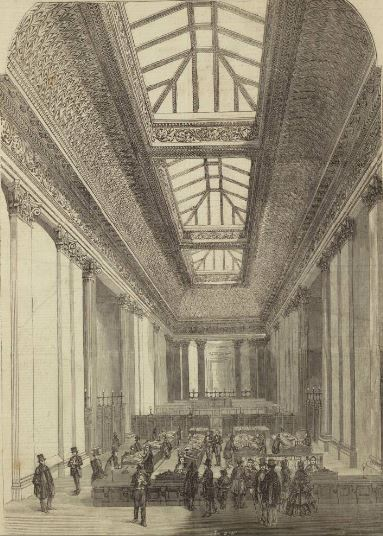
Interior of the Hall of Commerce, Threadneedle Street, after conversion to the London Bank

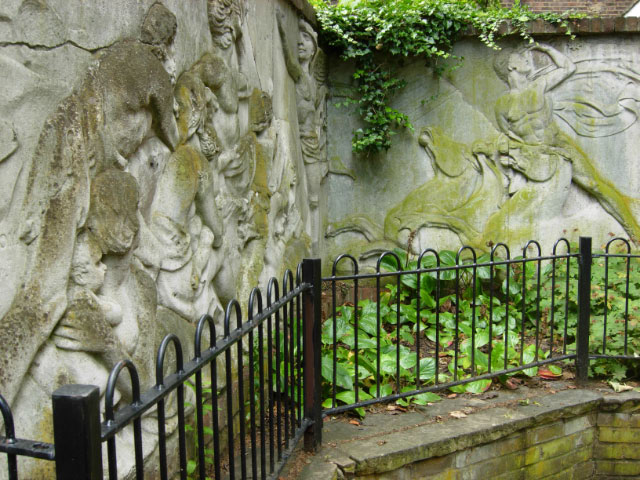
Part of the Musgrave Watson frieze in Battishill Gardens

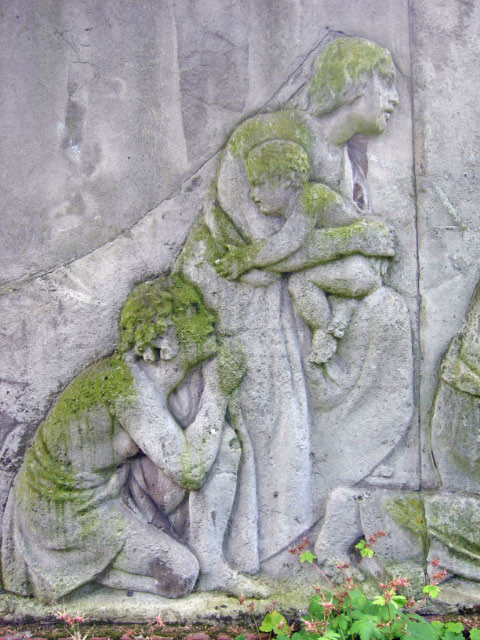
Detail of the Musgrave Watson frieze in Battishill Gardens

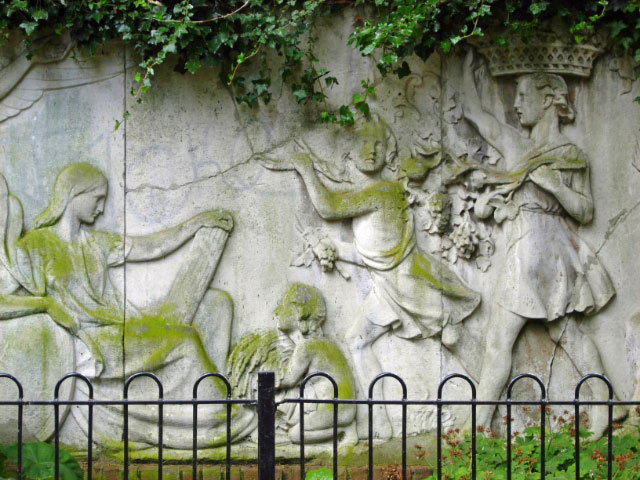
Detail of the Musgrave Watson frieze in Battishill Gardens

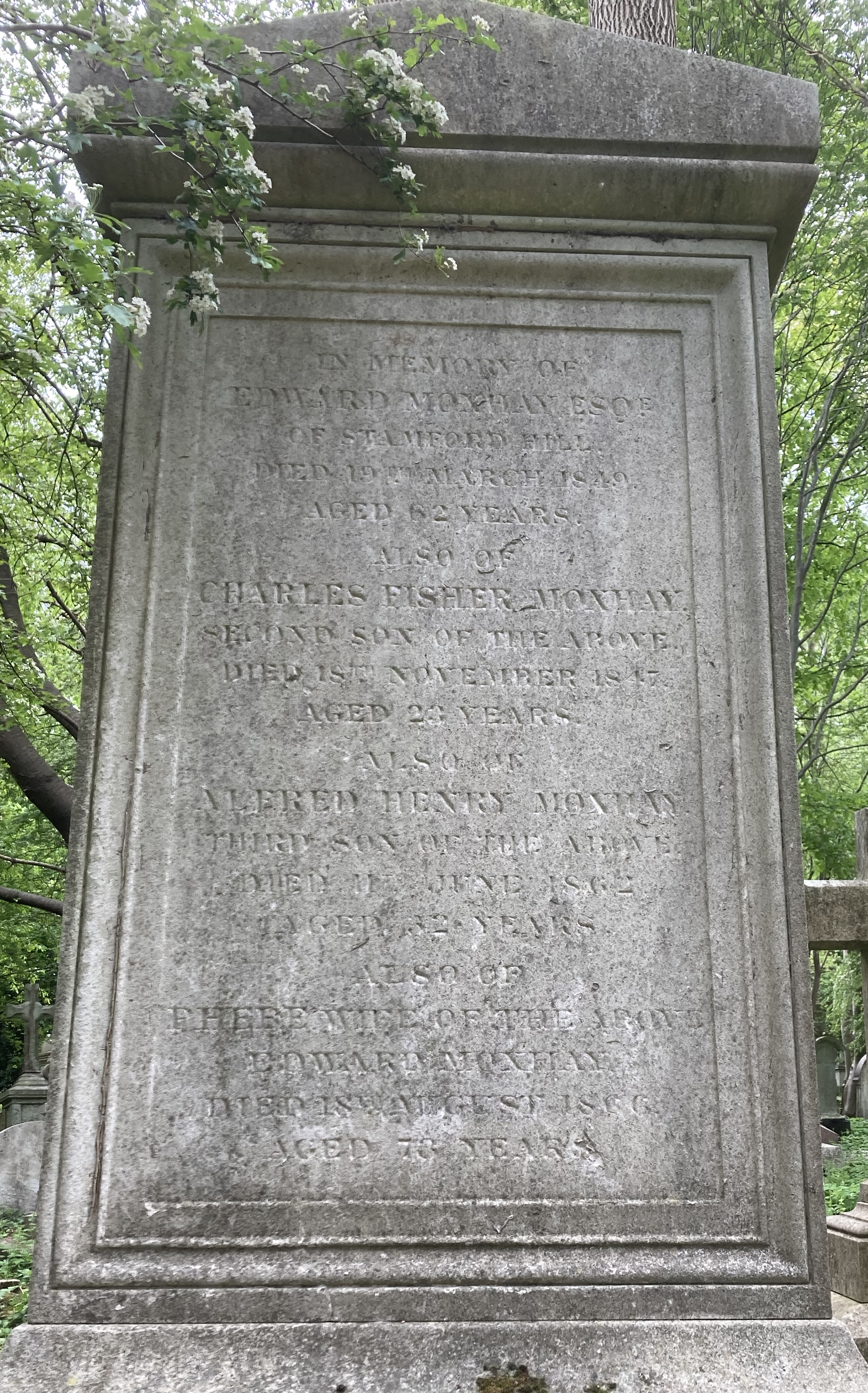
Family grave of Edward Moxhay in Highgate Cemetery
