= List of public art in Soho =

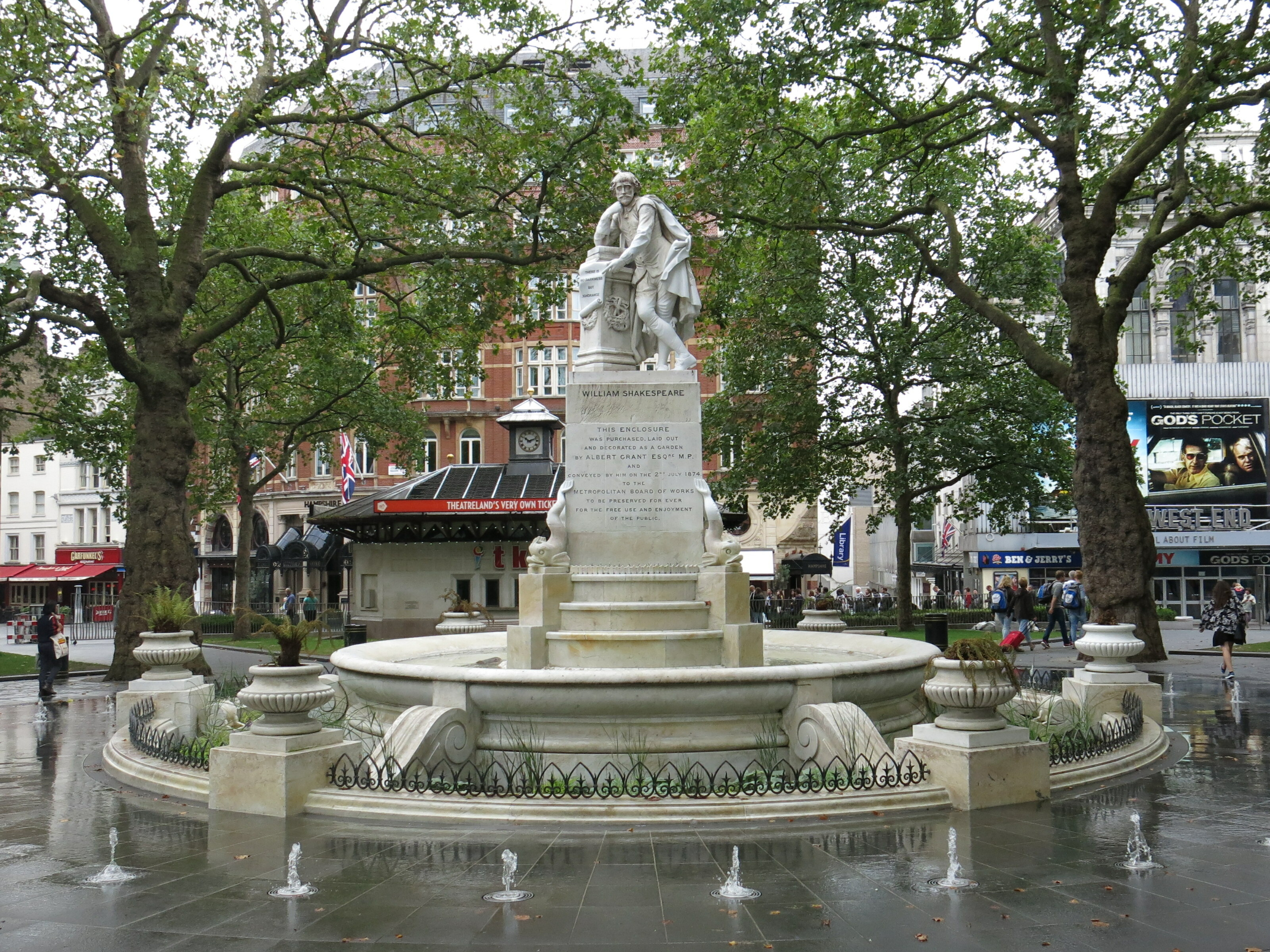
The statue of William Shakespeare on Leicester Square

This is a list of public art in Soho, a district in the City of Westminster, London. Soho is an area first developed in the 1670s, which since the construction of theatres along Shaftesbury Avenue in the 19th century has had a strong association with the entertainment industry.

In the south of the district stands Leicester Square, the public sculpture of which has had an eventful history. From 1748 the square had as its centrepiece an equestrian figure of George I, but this deteriorated and was sold off at the beginning of the following century. In 1874 the square was bought by Albert Grant, a company promoter and MP, who had its gardens made over to a design by James Knowles.

Knowles's refurbishment of Leicester Square saw the installation of a statue of William Shakespeare and busts of four historical residents of the locale: Isaac Newton, William Hogarth, Joshua Reynolds, and John Hunter. Each of these busts was positioned near the site of its subject's former home. The busts were severely damaged by inept restoration work in the 1990s and were removed during a renovation of the square carried out between 2010 and 2012. The 1981 statue of Charlie Chaplin which had been displaced as a result of these works returned to the square in 2016. In 2020, Chaplin's statue was joined by several others also on the theme of cinema, which together comprise the sculptural trail Scenes in the Square.

Image	Title / subject	Location and coordinates	Date	Artist / designer	Architect / other	Type	Designation	Notes
More images	Statue of Charles II	Soho Square 51°30′55″N 0°07′56″W	1681	Caius Gabriel Cibber	—N/a	Statue	Grade II	Originally formed the crowning element of a fountain at the centre of Soho Square. In 1875, the badly weathered statue was moved to the garden of Grim's Dyke, Harrow Weald, later the home of W. S. Gilbert. It was returned to the square in 1938, according to the wishes of Gilbert's widow.
More images	Statue of George II	Golden Square 51°30′42″N 0°08′14″W	1720	John Nost the Elder	—N/a	Statue	Grade II	A statue of an allegorical figure in Roman costume, made for Cannons, the seat of the Duke of Chandos in Little Stanhope, Middlesex. An anonymous bidder bought the statue at the sale of the house's contents and erected it in Golden Square as "George II" on 14 March 1753.
	Four statues in niches	Criterion Theatre and Restaurant, Piccadilly Circus	c. 1871–1874	Edward William Wyon	Thomas Verity	Architectural sculpture	Grade II*	
	Bust of Edward Smith-Stanley, 14th Earl of Derby	St Peter's School, Great Windmill Street	1871	Attributed to Hamilton MacCarthy, after Matthew Noble	J. T. Wimperis	Architectural sculpture	—N/a	Believed to be based on a bust by Noble in the Guildhall, destroyed in 1940. Lord Derby was a benefactor to the school, which moved from temporary premises to this new building after his death.
More images	Statue of William Shakespeare	Leicester Square 51°30′37″N 0°07′48″W	1874	Giovanni Fontana after Peter Scheemakers	James Knowles	Fountain with statue	Grade II	Unveiled 3 July 1874. Based on William Kent and Scheemakers's memorial to the Bard in Poets' Corner, Westminster Abbey. The scroll held by the figure of Shakespeare bears a quotation from Twelfth Night (Act 4, Scene 2): there is/ no darkness/ but/ ignorance
	George Maule Allen Memorial Drinking Fountain	St Anne's Churchyard	1890	?	—N/a	Drinking fountain	—N/a	Inscribed erected in memory of/ george maule allen/ of 17 carlisle street soho square/ born 4th october 1855/ died 29th april 1889/ aged 33 years
More images	Shaftesbury Memorial Fountain Anthony Ashley-Cooper, 7th Earl of Shaftesbury	Piccadilly Circus 51°30′36″N 0°08′04″W	1885–1893	Alfred Gilbert	Howard Ince (consulted on design)	Fountain with statue	Grade I	Unveiled 29 June 1893. Gilbert criticised contemporary statues for being too literal and inartistic, and chose instead to symbolise Lord Shaftesbury's philanthropy with an allegorical figure. This was intended to represent Anteros or "The Angel of Christian Charity", but it became popularly identified with the Greek god's twin brother Eros.
	Muses and putti surrounding a bust of Shakespeare	Wyndham's Theatre, 32–36 Charing Cross Road	1899	?	W. G. R. Sprague	Relief	Grade II*	
More images	M. Gaudin Riding a Snail	L'Escargot, 48 Greek Street	c. 1900?	?	?	Relief	Grade II	Gaudin was the first restaurateur of L'Escargot.
	Angels	Apollo Theatre, Shaftesbury Avenue	c. 1900–1901	T. Simpson	Lewen Sharp	Architectural sculpture	Grade II	
More images	Statue of Henry Irving	Irving Street 51°30′35″N 0°07′42″W	1910	Thomas Brock	—N/a	Statue	Grade II	Unveiled 5 December 1910. The street between the statue and the National Portrait Gallery, formerly Green Street, was renamed in the actor's honour in 1938. The formal gardens were laid out, with railings bearing the monogram HI, for the Festival of Britain in 1951; these were unveiled by Laurence Olivier.
	Euterpe	13–14 Archer Street	1912	Charles James Pibworth	Adams & Holden	Relief	—N/a	13–14 Archer Street was built as clubrooms for the Orchestral Association.
	Britannia with the Wealth of East and West	208–222 Regent Street (formerly Liberty's department store)	1914 (designed); 1923–1924 (executed)	Charles Doman and Thomas John Clapperton	Edwin Thomas Hall and Edwin Stanley Hall	Frieze	Grade II	At 115 ft long and 7 ft high, this has in the past been claimed to be the largest sculpture in London.
	Charles James Fox and Sam House	Byron at the Intrepid Fox, 97–99 Wardour Street	1915	?	W. Bradford & Sons	Faience relief	—N/a	Sam House was the landlord of the pub on this site, which he named The Intrepid Fox to express his admiration for the statesman. The relief shows Fox and House, the latter holding a placard inscribed champion/ of the/ people, standing in front of the 18th-century pub.
More images	The Mayflower	Liberty's department store, Great Marlborough Street	1924	?	Edwin Thomas Hall and Edwin Stanley Hall	Weather vane	Grade II*	
	Britannia and many other figures	County Fire Office Building, 218–222 Regent Street	c. 1924–1927	Joseph Hermon Cawthra	Ernest Newton	Architectural sculpture	Grade II	
More images	Liberty Clock	Liberty's department store, Great Marlborough Street 51.5145°N 0.1386°W	1925	Frank Hope-Jones	Edwin Thomas Hall and Edwin Stanley Hall	Clock	Grade II*	
	Bust of William Shakespeare	The Shakespeare's Head pub, 29 Great Marlborough Street, on the corner with Fouberts Place	1928	?	G. G. Macfarlane	Architectural sculpture	—N/a	
	Bathing Belles	Marshall Street Leisure Centre	c. 1928–1931	Herbert Tyson Smith	A. W. S. and K. M. S. Cross	Architectural sculpture	Grade II	
	Sight and Sound	Vue West End, Leicester Square	1938	Edward Bainbridge Copnall	E. A. Stone and T. R. Somerford	Reliefs	—N/a	
	Reliefs	Foyles, Charing Cross Road	c. 1939	Adolfine Mary Ryland	E. P. Wheeler and H. F. T. Cooper	Reliefs	—N/a	The building originally housed St Martin's School of Art and the College for Distributive Trades. Ryland's reliefs relate to shop display. The coat of arms of the London County Council and the inscriptions were carved by Percy J. Delf Smith.
	Tympanum	French Protestant Church, Soho Square	1950	J. Prangnelli	Aston Webb	Relief	Grade II*	Marks the 400th anniversary of the founding of the Strangers' Church in Threadneedle Street. The relief shows the Huguenots departing from France, their arrival at Dover and the granting of the royal charter establishing the church by Edward VI.
	Angels and stars	Church of Our Lady of the Assumption and St Gregory, Warwick Street	1952–1957	?	Joseph Bonomi the Elder	Architectural sculpture	Grade II*	
	Our Lady of Mercy	Notre Dame de France, Leicester Place	1953	Georges Saupique	Hector Corfiato	Architectural sculpture	Grade II*	
	The Spirit of Electricity	Orion House (formerly Thorn House), Litchfield Street	1958–1961	Geoffrey Clarke	Andrew Renton of Basil Spence and Partners (c. 1958); Renton Howard Wood Levin (1988–1990 renovation)	Architectural sculpture	Grade II	The building was the headquarters of Thorn Electrical Industries; during renovation the sculpture was moved from the east (Upper St Martin's Lane) elevation to the north.
More images	Glockenspiel	Swiss Court 51.5105°N 0.1312°W	1968; altered 1985 and again in 2008	Fritz Fuchs	?	Glockenspiel	—N/a	A gift to the City of Westminster from Switzerland and Liechtenstein, the clock originally adorned the Swiss Centre on this street. In 2008 the site was redeveloped, and as a condition of planning approval the Glockenspiel was retained and redesigned as a freestanding clock. Re-inaugurated 28 November 2011.
More images	Cantonal Tree	Swiss Court 51°30′38″N 0°07′53″W	1977	?	—N/a	Wooden post with shields of the Swiss cantons attached	—N/a	An antique inn sign, given by Switzerland in May 1977 to mark the Silver Jubilee of Elizabeth II. The street was given its current name on 15 April 1991, on the 700th anniversary of the founding of the Swiss Confederation.
More images	Statue of Charlie Chaplin	Leicester Square	1979	John Doubleday	—N/a	Statue	—N/a	Unveiled 16 April 1981, the 92nd anniversary of Chaplin's birth, by Ralph Richardson. A slightly modified version was erected in Vevey, the Swiss town Chaplin made his home, the following year. The London statue has been moved multiple times within Leicester Square and the vicinity; it was unveiled on its current site on 16 April 2016.
More images	Mosaics	Tottenham Court Road station	1980–1986	Eduardo Paolozzi	—N/a	Glass mosaics	—N/a	The mosaics on the Central line platforms are replete with references to the neighbourhood above ground, particularly its shops selling books, musical instruments and electronics, whereas those on the two Northern line platforms are abstract in design. The mosaics between the entrance and the platforms were the final part of the scheme to be completed. During construction work for the Elizabeth line in 2017, 5% of the mosaics were removed and the remainder restored. The detached panels were given to the Edinburgh College of Art, in Paolozzi's birthplace.
More images	Chinese guardian lions	Gerrard Street 51°30′42″N 0°07′52″W	1985	?	—N/a	Sculptures	—N/a	Unveiled 29 October 1985 by the Duke of Gloucester at the formal opening of Chinatown. A gift from the People's Republic of China.
	Ode to the West Wind	17 Noel Street 51°30′53″N 0°08′13″W	1989	Louise Vines and the London Wall Mural Group	—N/a	Mural	—N/a	Inspired by the eponymous poem of 1819 by Percy Bysshe Shelley, who lived around the corner in 15 Poland Street; the mutilated tree is also a reference to the Great Storm of 1987. Originally proposed in 1986 by the Soho Jazz Festival, which then abandoned the commission; it was subsequently taken up by the Soho Society.
More images	The Spirit of Soho	Broadwick Street 51°30′46″N 0°08′18″W	1991	FreeForm Arts Trust	—N/a	Mural	—N/a	Saint Anne, as patroness of Soho, is portrayed in a dress bearing a map of the district. At her feet are gathered several former residents, including Casanova and Marx. Six smaller scenes depict forms of work and leisure characteristic of the area. Restored in 2006.
More images	The Horses of Helios	Haymarket, near Piccadilly Circus 51.5100°N 0.1334°W	1992	Rudy Weller	Peter Howard of Renton Howard Wood Levine Partnership	Architectural sculpture	—N/a	
More images	The Three Graces	Coventry Street	1992	Rudy Weller	Peter Howard of Renton Howard Wood Levine Partnership	Architectural sculpture	—N/a	
More images	Imagine John Lennon	Carnaby Street, outside Liberty's department store	2009	Lawrence Holofcener	—N/a	Statue	—N/a	Unveiled 9 October 2021, which would have been Lennon's 81st birthday. The first casting of the sculpture was unveiled in Mount Dora, Florida, on the same day in 2010.
More images	Lion	64 Shaftesbury Avenue (corner with Wardour Street)	2009	Hsiao-Chi Tsai and Kimiyo Yoshikawa		Architectural sculpture	—N/a	
	Timelines	Wilder Walk 51°30′38″N 0°08′08″W	2011	Daniela Schönbächler	Dixon Jones Architects	Light installation	—N/a	
	Selene	Nadler Hotel, Carlisle Street	2013	Hew Locke	Robert Adam	Architectural sculpture	—N/a	The sculptor wished to create "a classical statue with a contemporary twist" and add to the small number of statues of black women in London. Inspirations for the work include Art Nouveau, fairy paintings by Atkinson Grimshaw and drag queens in Soho.
	Vital Signs	Quadrant 3, corner of Brewer Street and Sherwood Street	2013	Spencer Finch	Dixon Jones Architects (redevelopment of the Regent Palace Hotel)	Light installation		
More images	Group	Ham Yard	2014	Tony Cragg	—N/a	Sculpture	—N/a	Part of the sculptor's Rational Beings series.
	'Diamonds and Circles', works 'in situ'	Tottenham Court Road station	2015	Daniel Buren	Hawkins\Brown and Acanthus Architects	Decorative motifs	—N/a	A pattern of alternating circle and diamond shapes, 2.4m in height and diameter. The first phase of the redevelopment of the station, the entrance and ticket hall on Oxford Street, opened in January 2015.
	Shaida Walking. 2015	Broadwick Street	2015	Julian Opie	—N/a	LED installation	—N/a	Installed in 2016 as part of the Lumiere light festival.
More images	Beauty < Immortality Frank Pick	Piccadilly Circus tube station 51.5099°N 0.1346°W	2016	Langlands & Bell	—N/a	Memorial	—N/a	Unveiled 7 November 2016, the 75th anniversary of Pick's death. A sequence of words found by the artists on a note in Pick's personal papers is inscribed with bronze letters in the Johnston typeface commissioned by him. To the right, Pick's name appears in the London Underground roundel.
More images	Blackbird (the persistence of vision)	48 Leicester Square	2016	Kenny Hunter	MAKE Architects	Reliefs	—N/a	
	Praise the Rain	Dean Street	2017	Gary Hume		Relief	—N/a	
	Herm	Rathbone Square	2018	Alison Wilding	—N/a	Drinking fountain	—N/a	The bronze fountain provides water at different levels for adults, children and users of wheelchairs.
	Infinite Geometry	Rathbone Square	2018	Robert Orchardson	—N/a	Gates	—N/a	
	No Title	Tottenham Court Road station	2018	Richard Wright		Ceiling decoration	—N/a	A geometric pattern in gold leaf on the ceiling above the escalator for the eastern ticket hall.
More images	Geology Rebuilt	Soho Place	2022	Fernando Casasempere	—N/a	Sculpture	—N/a	Unveiled in Spring 2022.
More images	Reflection	Dean Street	2022	David Breuer-Weil	—N/a	Sculpture	—N/a	Unveiled in Spring 2022.
	The Carnaby Mural	Little Marlborough Street	2022	Kristjana S. Williams		Mural	—N/a	Unveiled 24 November 2022.
	London is a Forest	Lucent building, Sherwood Street 51.5105°N 0.1353°W	2023	Acrylicize		Sculpture	—N/a	
	undergroundoverheard	Tottenham Court Road station, Dean Street entrance	2024	Douglas Gordon		Video art	—N/a	Unveiled 1 February 2024.

== Bibliography ==
- Bradley, Simon; Pevsner, Nikolaus (2003). London 6: Westminster. The Buildings of England. London and New Haven: Yale University Press. ISBN 978-0-300-09595-1.
- Gleichen, Lord Edward (1973). London's Open-Air Statuary. Bath: Cedric Chivers Ltd.
- Matthews, Peter (2018). London's Statues and Monuments. Oxford: Shire Publications. ISBN 978-1-78442-256-1.
- Paolozzi, Eduardo (1984). Robinson, Marlee (ed.). Eduardo Paolozzi: Private Vision—Public Art. London: Architectural Association Publications. ISBN 978-0904503500.
- Ward-Jackson, Philip (2011). Public Sculpture of Historic Westminster: Volume 1. Public Sculpture of Britain. Vol. 14. Liverpool: Liverpool University Press. ISBN 978-1-84631-691-3.
