= Statue of Charlie Chaplin, London =

Statue in Leicester Square, London

Statue of Charlie Chaplin
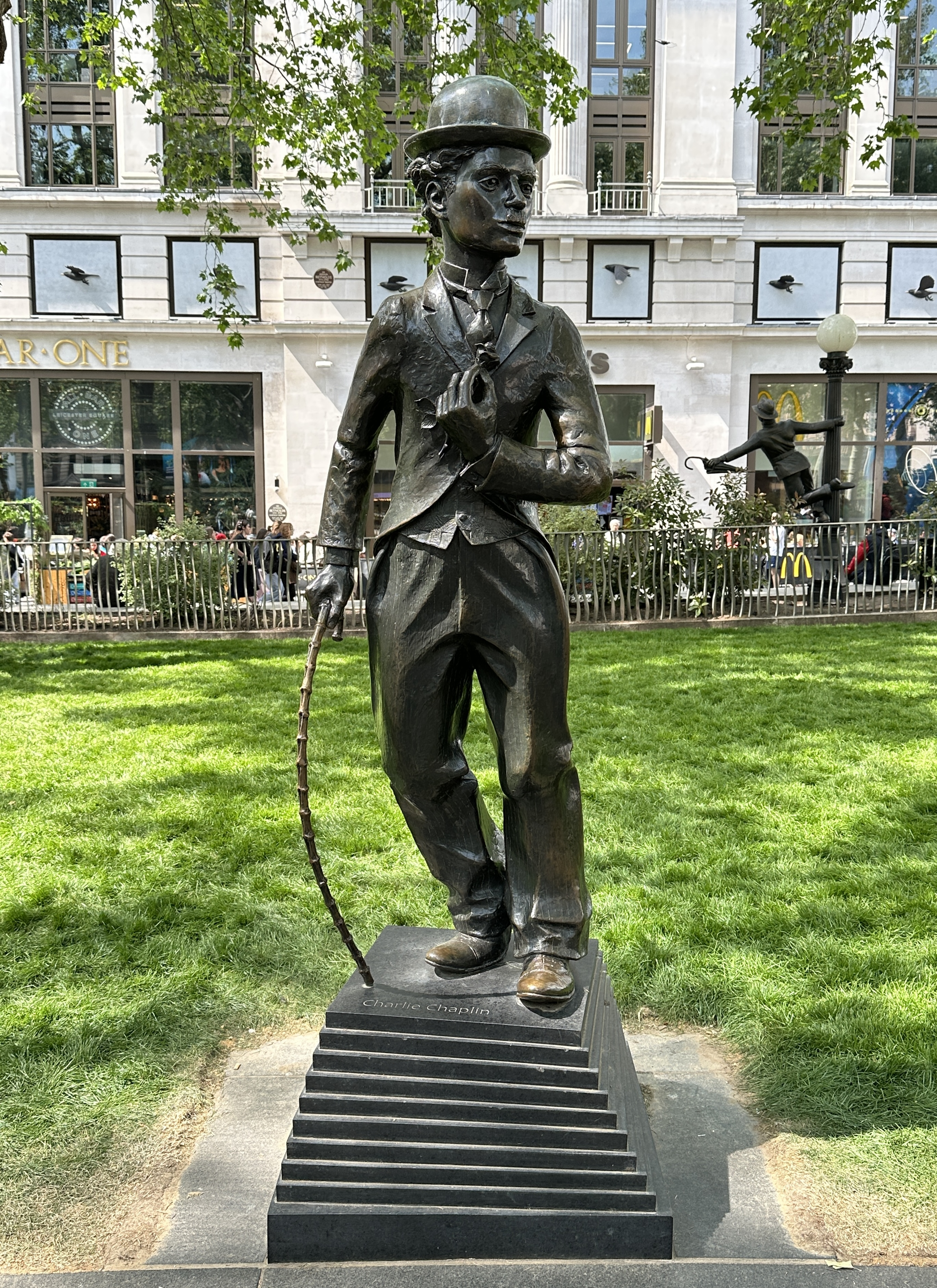
- Year: 1981
- Location: United Kingdom; 51°30′41″N 0°07′50″W

The statue of Charlie Chaplin in Leicester Square, London, is a work of 1979 by the sculptor John Doubleday. It portrays the actor, comedian and filmmaker in his best-known role, as The Tramp.

A memorial to Chaplin in the city of his birth was proposed on 25 December 1977, soon after Chaplin's death, by Illtyd Harrington, the leader of the opposition in the Greater London Council. Initial plans for a memorial in the Elephant and Castle, in South London where Chaplin spent his early years, were dropped and instead Leicester Square, at the centre of London's entertainment district, became the preferred location for the work.

The bronze statue was first unveiled on 16 April 1981 (the 92nd anniversary of Chaplin's birth) at its original site, on the southwestern corner of the square, by the actor Sir Ralph Richardson. An inscription on the plinth read THE COMIC GENIUS/ WHO GAVE PLEASURE/ TO SO MANY. The following year a slightly modified version was erected in the Swiss town of Vevey, which had been Chaplin's home from 1952 until his death. Following a refurbishment of Leicester Square in 1989–1992, the statue was moved to a site north of the statue of William Shakespeare, the square's centrepiece.

In a later refurbishment of 2010–2012, Chaplin's statue was removed altogether, together with busts of William Hogarth, John Hunter, Sir Isaac Newton and Sir Joshua Reynolds. The statue was installed in a nearby street, Leicester Place, in 2013. This was in order to prevent damage to the sculpture during improvement works. In 2016 it returned to Leicester Square and was re-unveiled on Chaplin's birthday.

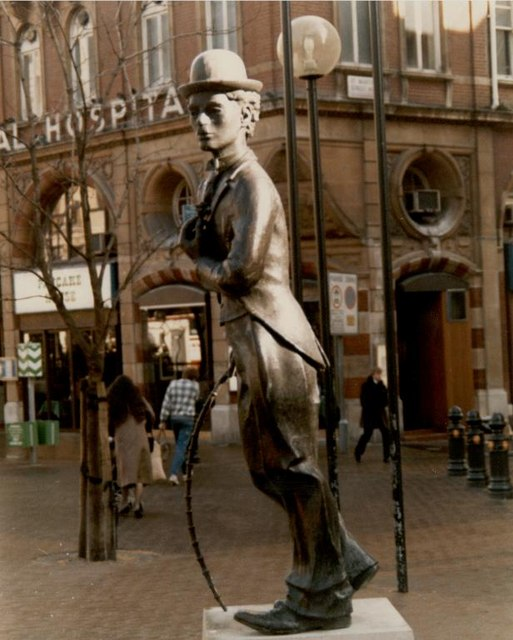
The statue in its original location in the 1980s

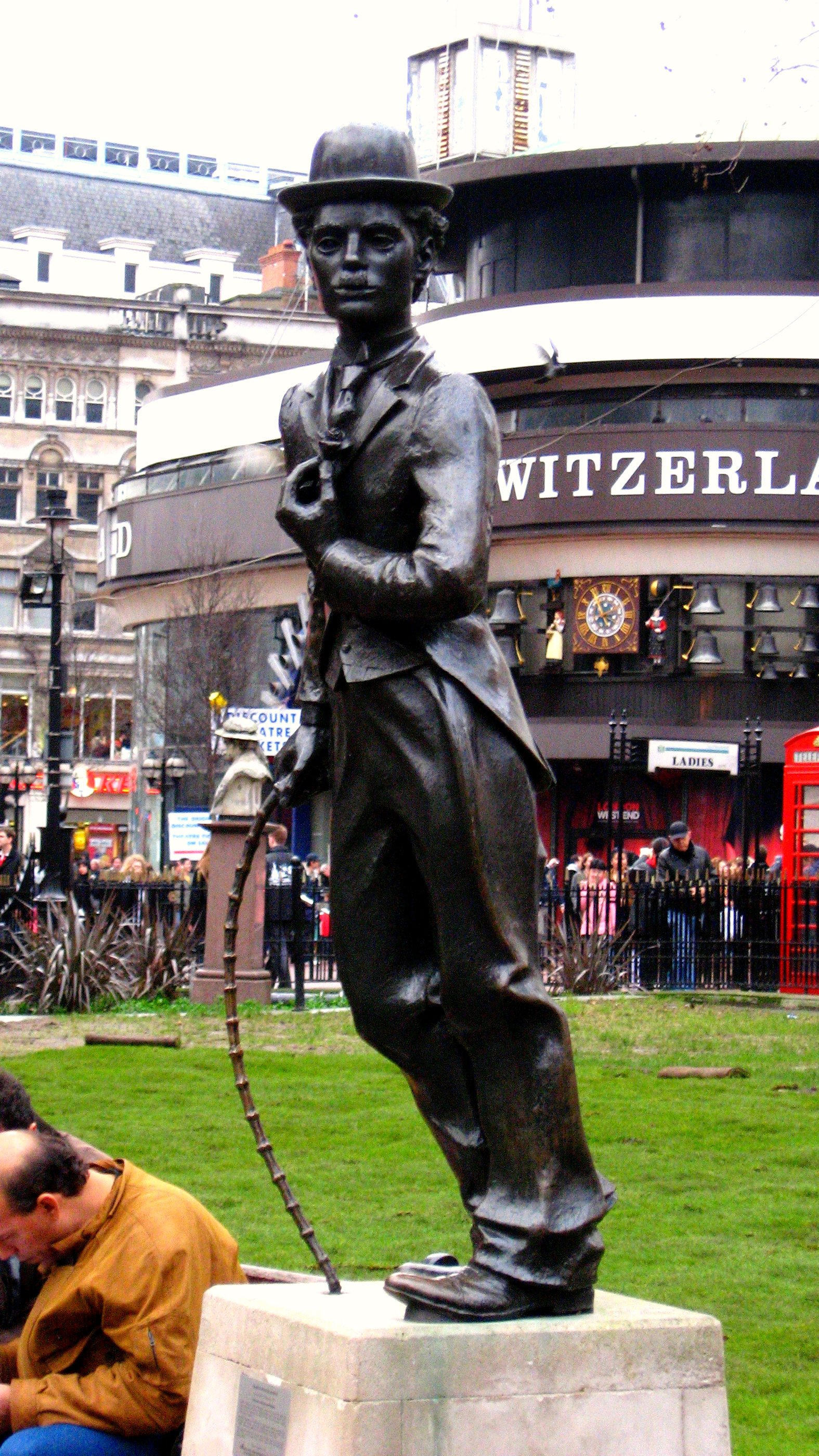
The statue's second location in Leicester Square, in 2008, with the Swiss Centre behind

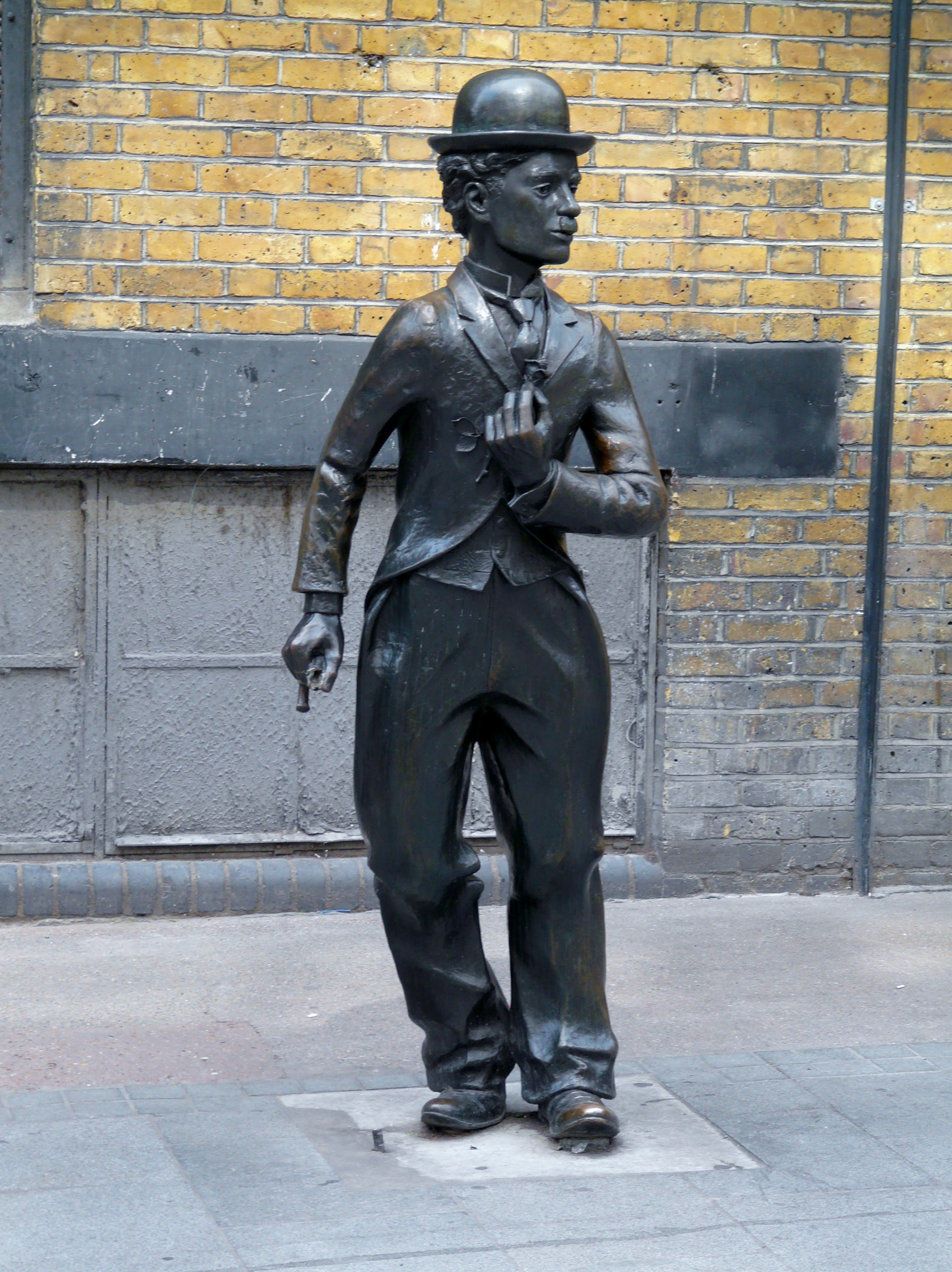
The statue in Leicester Place in 2014

== See also ==
- Scenes in the Square, a sculptural trail with a cinematic theme installed in Leicester Square in 2020
