= Fernando Casasempere =

Chilean sculptor and ceramic artist (born 1958)

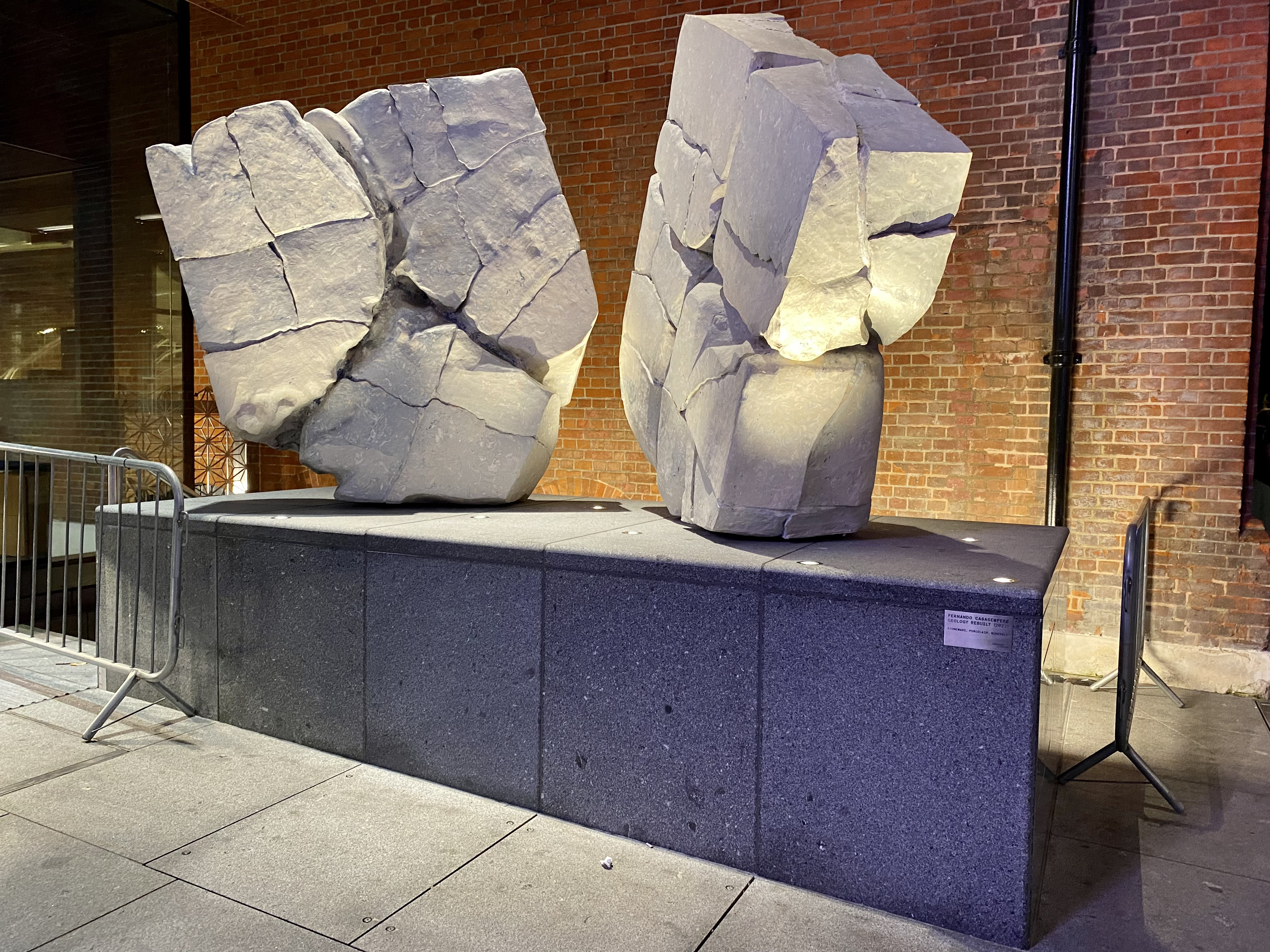
- Geology Rebuilt by Fernando Casasempere, Soho Place, Soho, August 2023
- Born: 1958 (age 67–68); Santiago, Chile
- Known for: Ceramic sculpture, installation art
- Notable work: "Out of Sync", "Back to the Earth"
- Style: Abstract, Environmental art, Pre-Columbian art inspired
- Awards: Loewe Prize shortlist (2022).
- Website: fernandocasasempere.com

Fernando Casasempere (born 1958) is a Chilean sculptor known for his work with clay and ceramics. In 1997, he moved from Santiago to London, bringing 12 tons of Chilean earth for his work.

== Career ==
Casasempere's work has been exhibited internationally, including solo and group exhibitions at major institutions. Such places where Casasempere has created environmental installations for The Courtauld Institute of Art, Somerset House, London (2012); the Museo Nacional de Bellas Artes, Santiago (2016); and the Atacama Desert (2015). His work is in public collections including the Victoria and Albert Museum, London; Museum of Fine Arts, Boston; Harvard Art Museums; Museum Boijmans Van Beuningen, Rotterdam; National Museum of Art, Osaka; Musée des Arts Décoratifs, Paris; International Museum of Ceramics, Faenza; and the San Diego Museum of Art.

His 2022 exhibition TERRA at the San Diego Museum of Art featured immersive installations.

In a 2022 review of Casasempere's installation Scratching the Surface at the London Mithraeum Bloomberg SPACE, Elizabeth Fullerton noted that the work addressed environmental concerns by juxtaposing ceramic forms resembling geological matter with industrial conveyor belts. The installation invited reflection on time, memory, and human impact on the earth. Fullerton described the exhibition as opening "a dialogue with the site that invites meditation on different temporalities and the passage of time."

== Critical reception ==
In a 2020 interview with Sculpture Magazine, Casasempere spoke about his work with porcelain and stoneware, focusing on developing new forms and expanding the medium's possibilities.

A 2022 review of his installation Scratching the Surface described ceramic pieces resembling geological materials alongside conveyor belts. The work referenced environmental themes and the passage of time.

Fernando Casasempere's work focuses on environmentalism, geology, and human impact on the earth. Drawing from archaeology and the landscape of Chile, he uses clay mixed with industrial waste to highlight ecological issues. Influenced by Pre-Columbian art, he blurs the line between ceramics vessels and sculpture. His work ranges from small forms to large installations made of many components forming a whole.

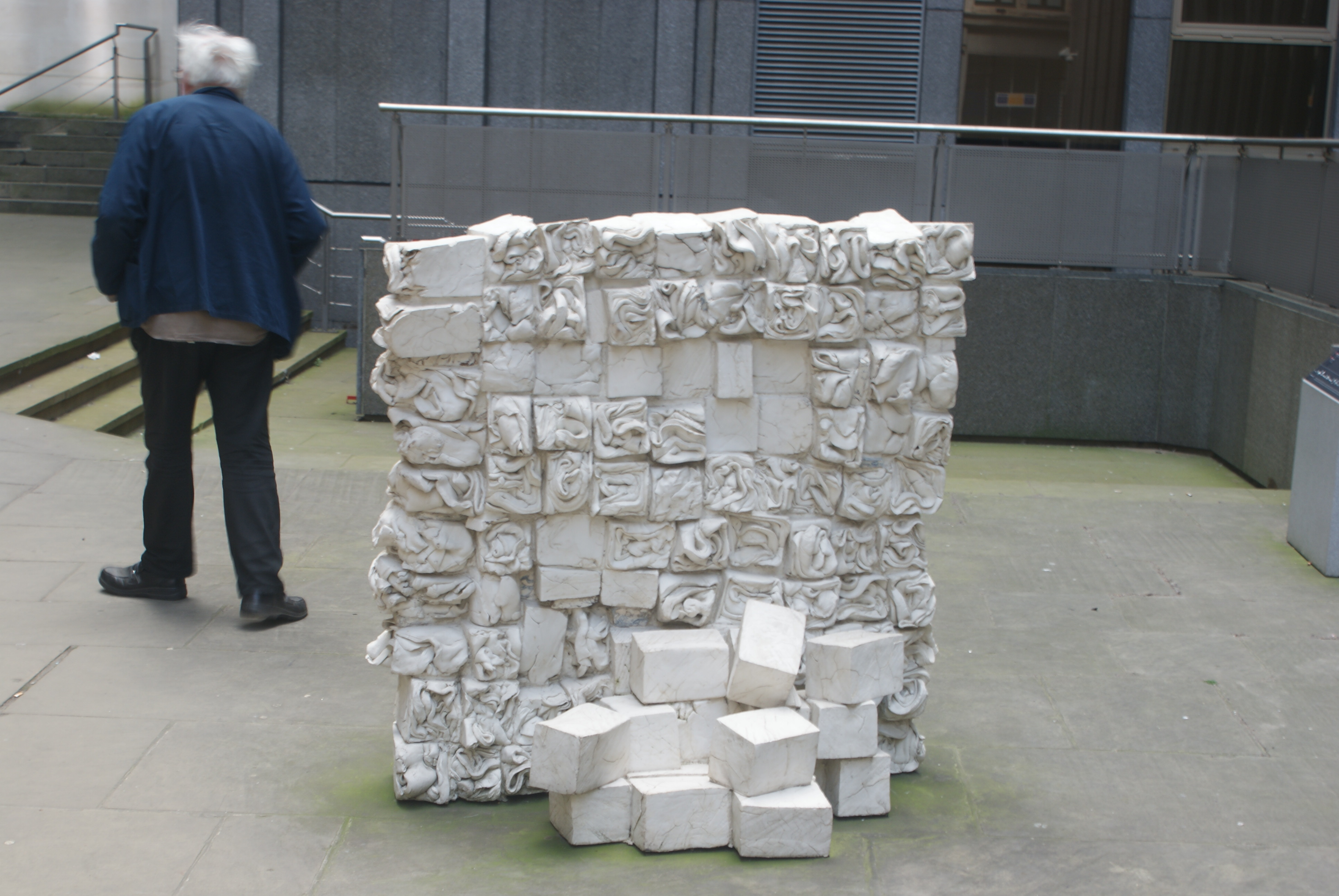
View of Fernando Casasempere's "Reminiscence" from Cunard Plac

== Collections ==
Victoria and Albert Museum, London:

- While, not on display, the museum's collection includes, Casasempere's "Vessel," a large dark brown stoneware form, coil-built and altered to draw in the sides, created in London in 2004. Height: 73.5cm Width: 63cm
- "Form," characterized by its unglazed stonework and elongated tube-like narrow shape. The dimensions of the piece are as follows: height of 14.5 cm and length of 89.5 cm. This item was created in 2002.
- Natura Morta 8 is a sculpture created by the artist Fernando Casasempere in 2018, which originates from London. This artwork features a slab-like porcelain structure characterized by a deeply fissured surface and a roughly carved reverse side. It is supported by a steel mount. The sculpture is made from ceramics, specifically porcelain and stoneware, and is hand-built and carved. The integral steel mount was also designed by the artist. Dimensions: Height: 67 cm; Width: 58 cm; Depth: 33 cm. Natura Morta 8 was presented in the solo exhibition titled 'Natura Morta' at Parafin, London, from November 23, 2018, to February 2, 2019.

=== Museum of Fine Arts, Boston ===
Houses an untitled piece by Casasempere, dated circa 2000, accession number 2015.3307.

His installation Out of Sync at Somerset House, featuring 10,000 ceramic flowers, was widely covered by media.

== Bibliography ==
- Casasempere, Fernando. Fernando Casasempere: Works 1991–2016 = Obras 1991–2016. Hatje Cantz, 2017. ISBN unavailable.
- Casasempere, Fernando. Fernando Casasempere: Interior Spaces Exhibition. Galería Ana Maria Stagno Marlborough, 2003.

== See also ==
- Sculpture in the City
- List of public art in Soho
- May S. Marcy Sculpture Garden
