= John Doubleday (sculptor) =

British artist

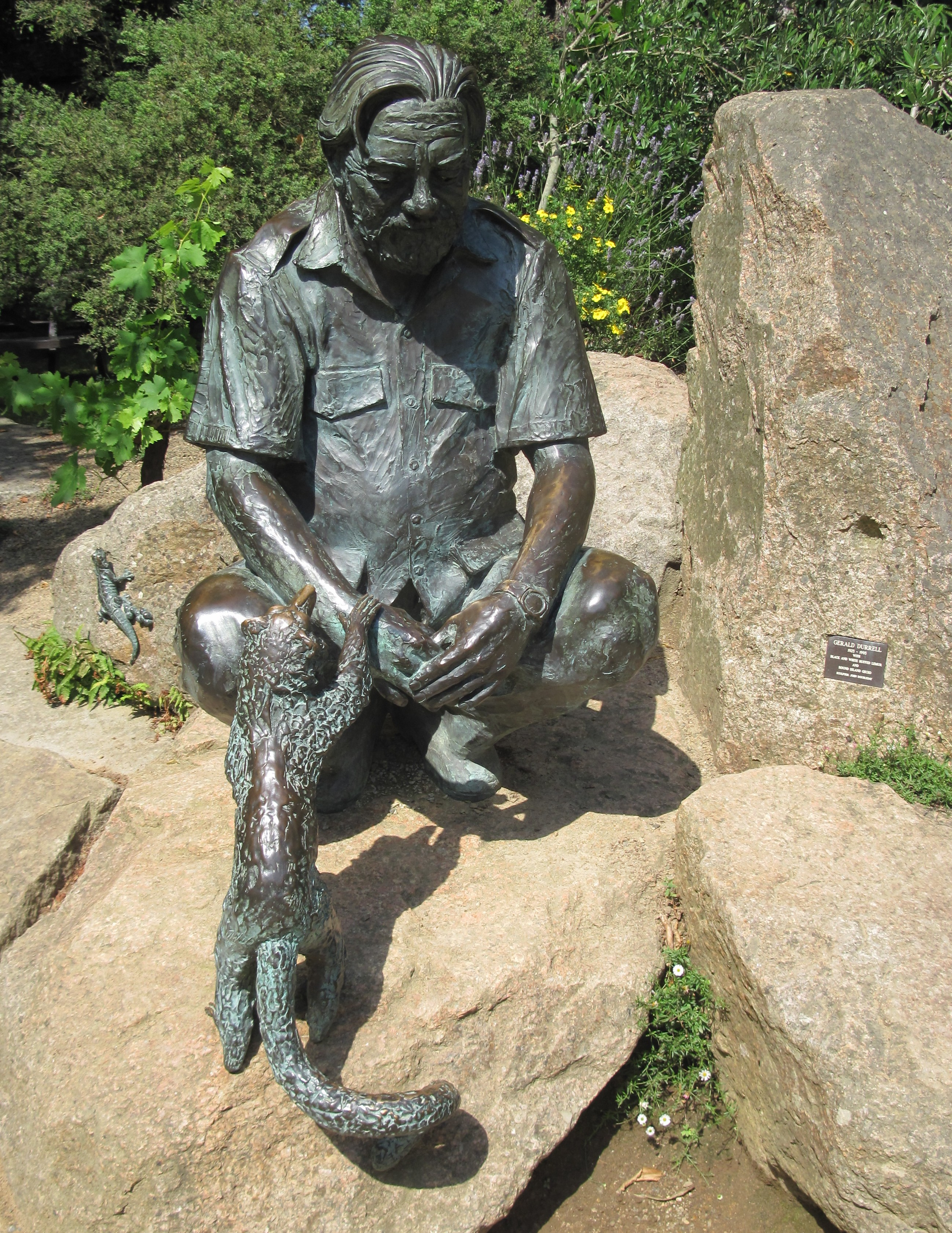
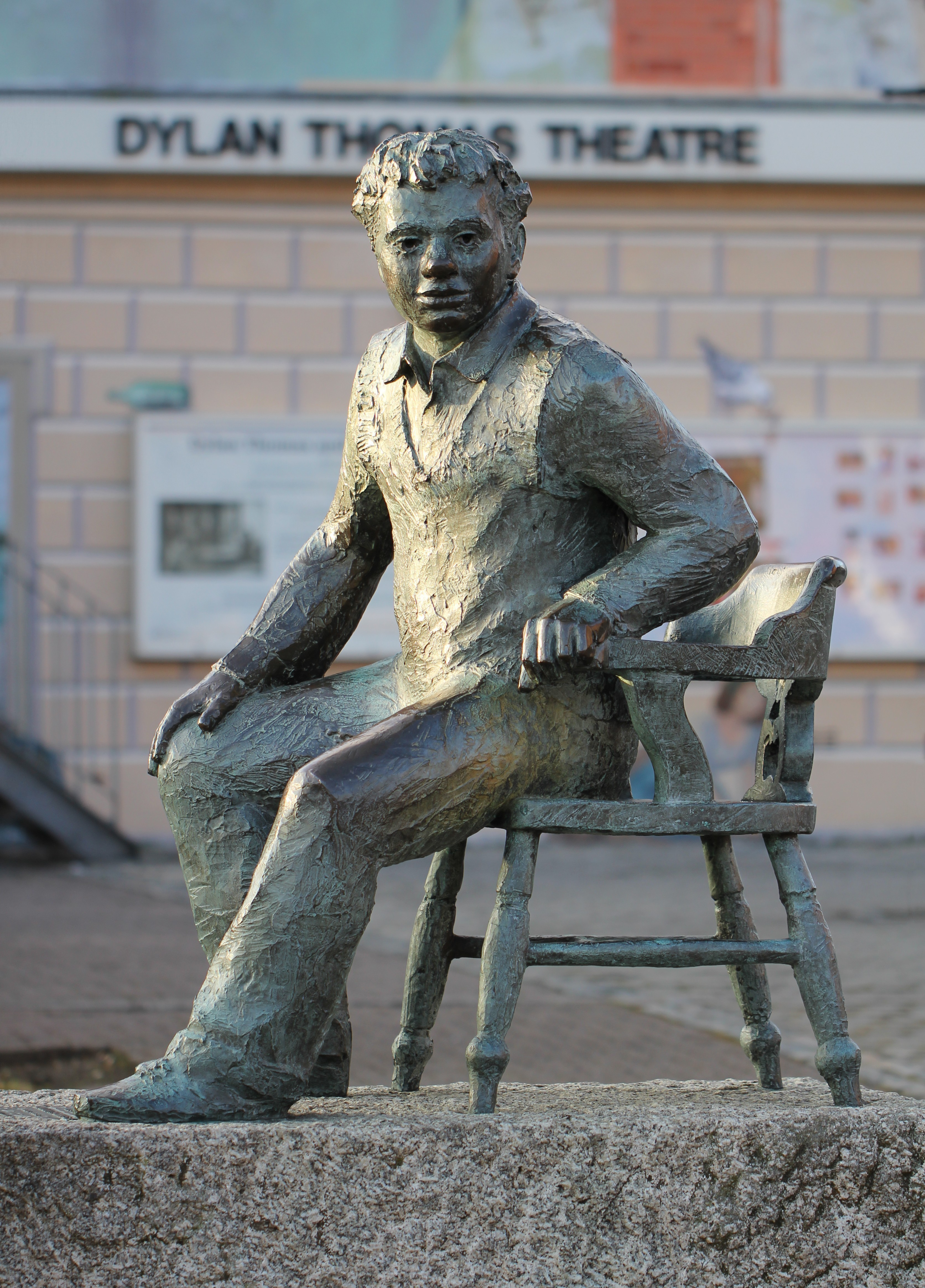
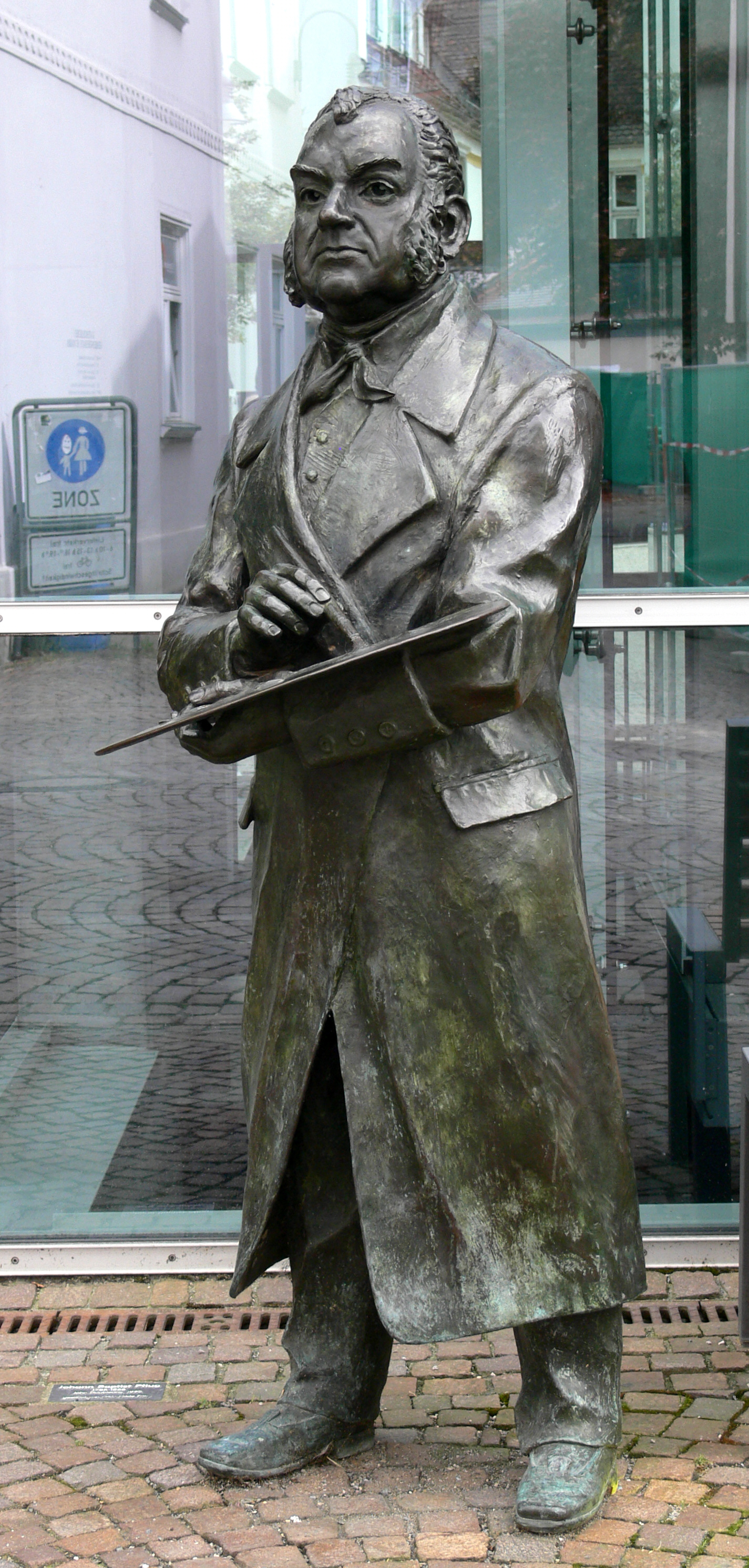
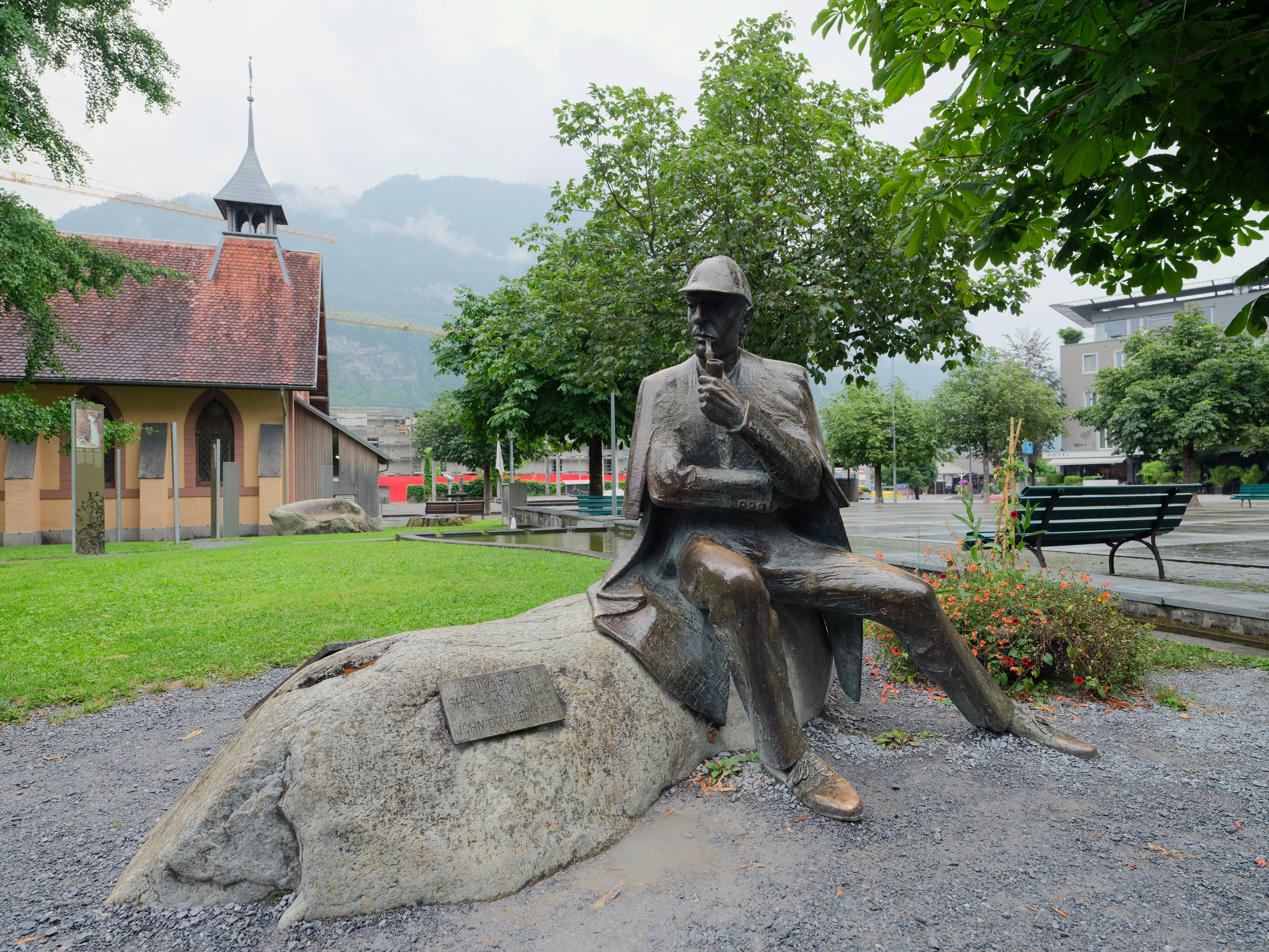
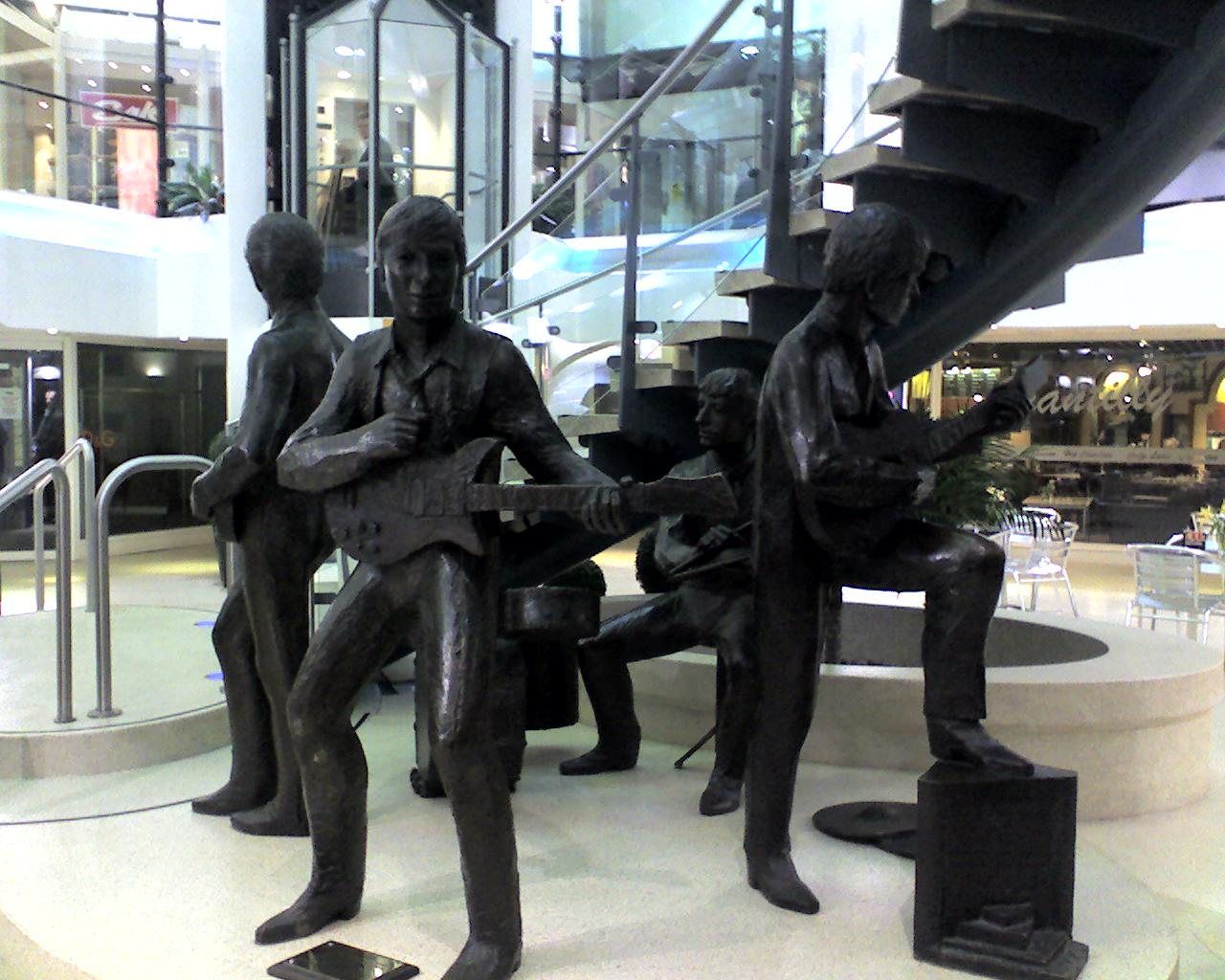
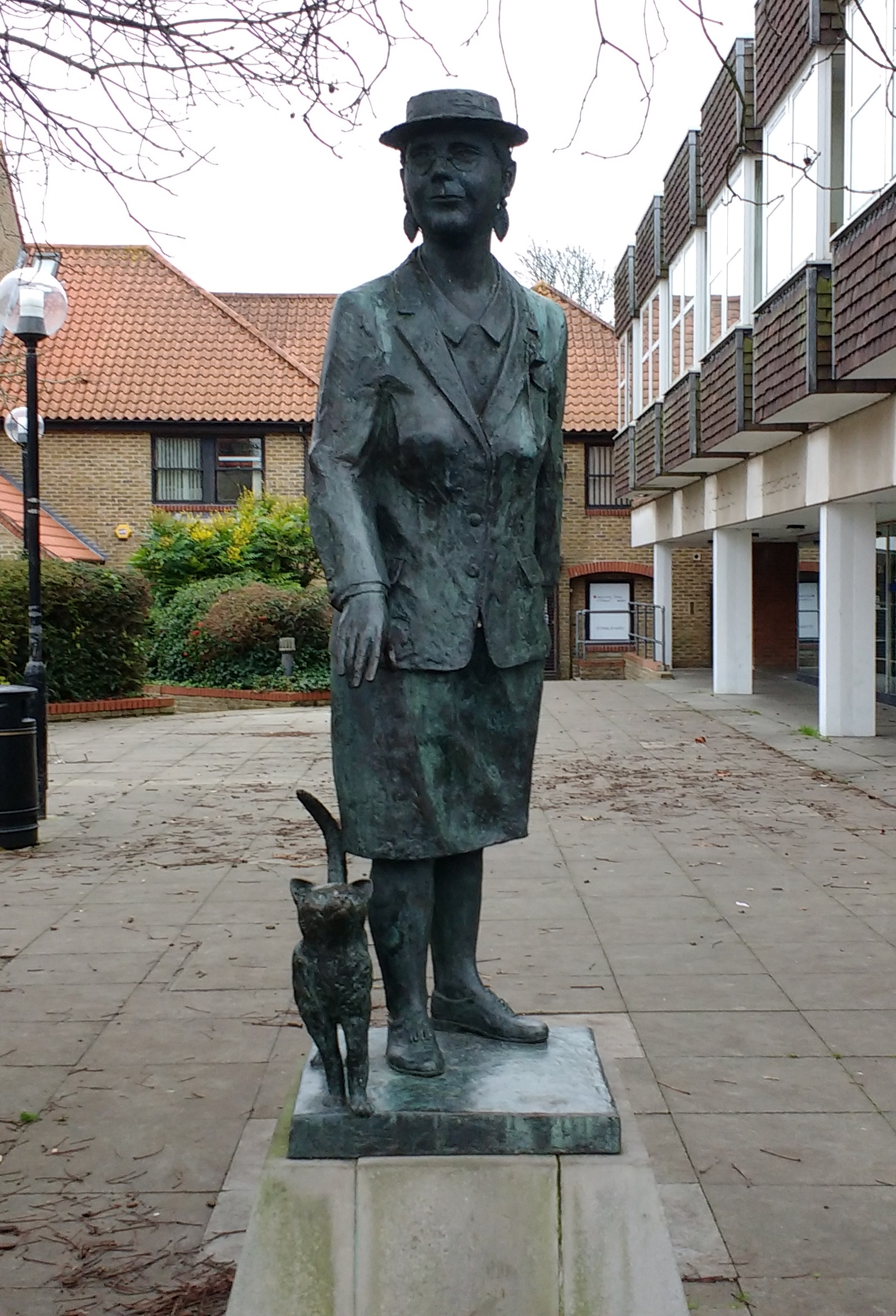
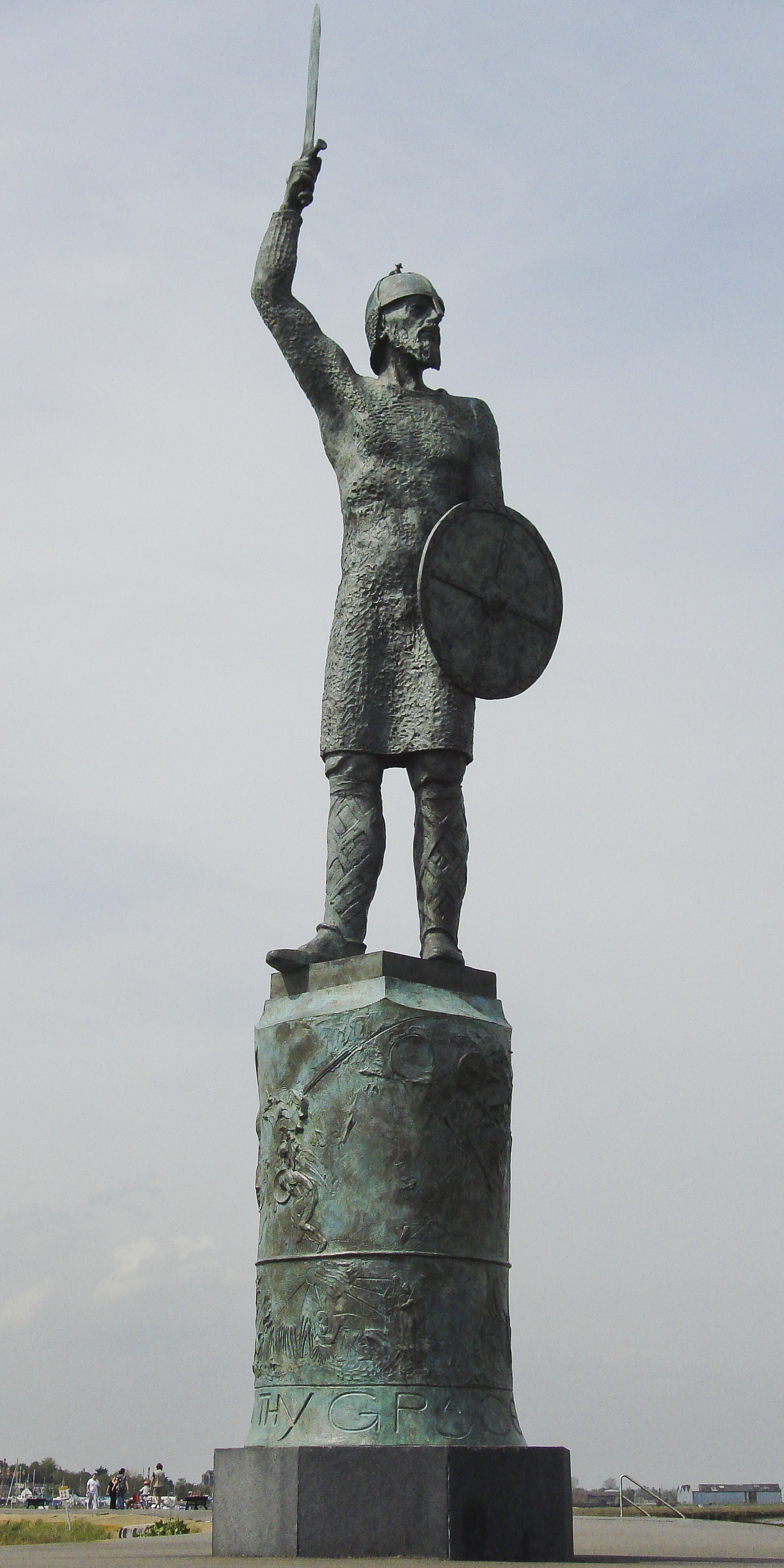
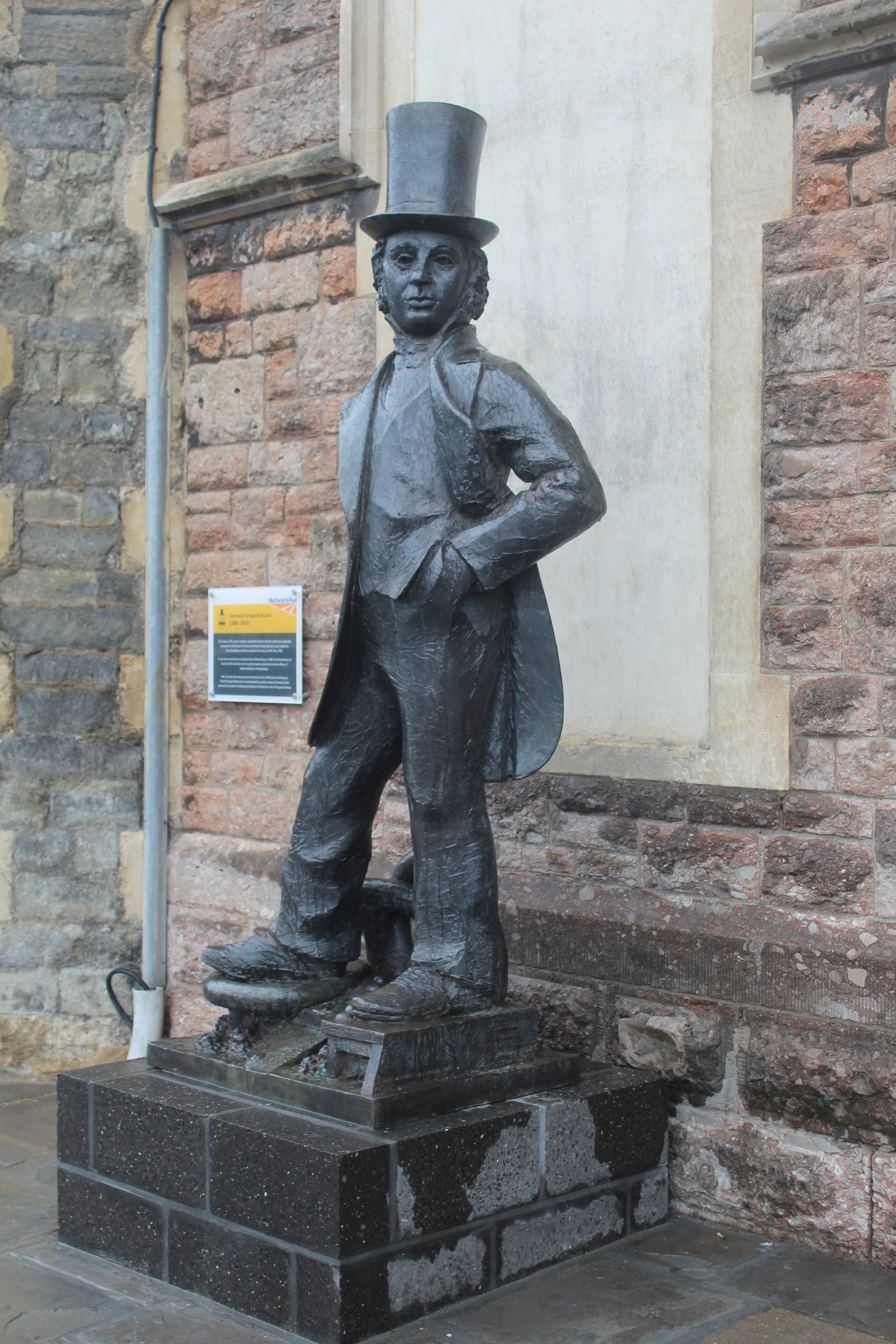
Statues by Doubleday from top, left to right: Gerald Durrell in Jersey Zoo, Dylan Thomas in Swansea, Johann Baptist Pflug in Biberach an der Riss, Sherlock Holmes in Meiringen, The Beatles near The Cavern Club, Dorothy L. Sayers in Witham, Byrhtnoth in Maldon and Isambard Kingdom Brunel in Bristol.

John Doubleday (born 9 October 1947) is a British sculptor and painter. His work includes statues of political leaders such as Nelson Mandela and Golda Meir as well as cultural icons such as The Beatles, Sherlock Holmes and Laurel and Hardy.

Doubleday was born in 1947 in Langford, near Maldon, Essex and studied sculpture at Goldsmiths College. In 2014, he unveiled a statue of Herbert George Columbine which is the United Kingdom's only statue of a named army private.

== See also ==
- Statue of Charlie Chaplin, London
- Statue of Sherlock Holmes, London
