= Scenes in the Square =

Film-themed sculpture trail in Leicester Square, London

Coordinates: 51.5104°N 0.1301°W

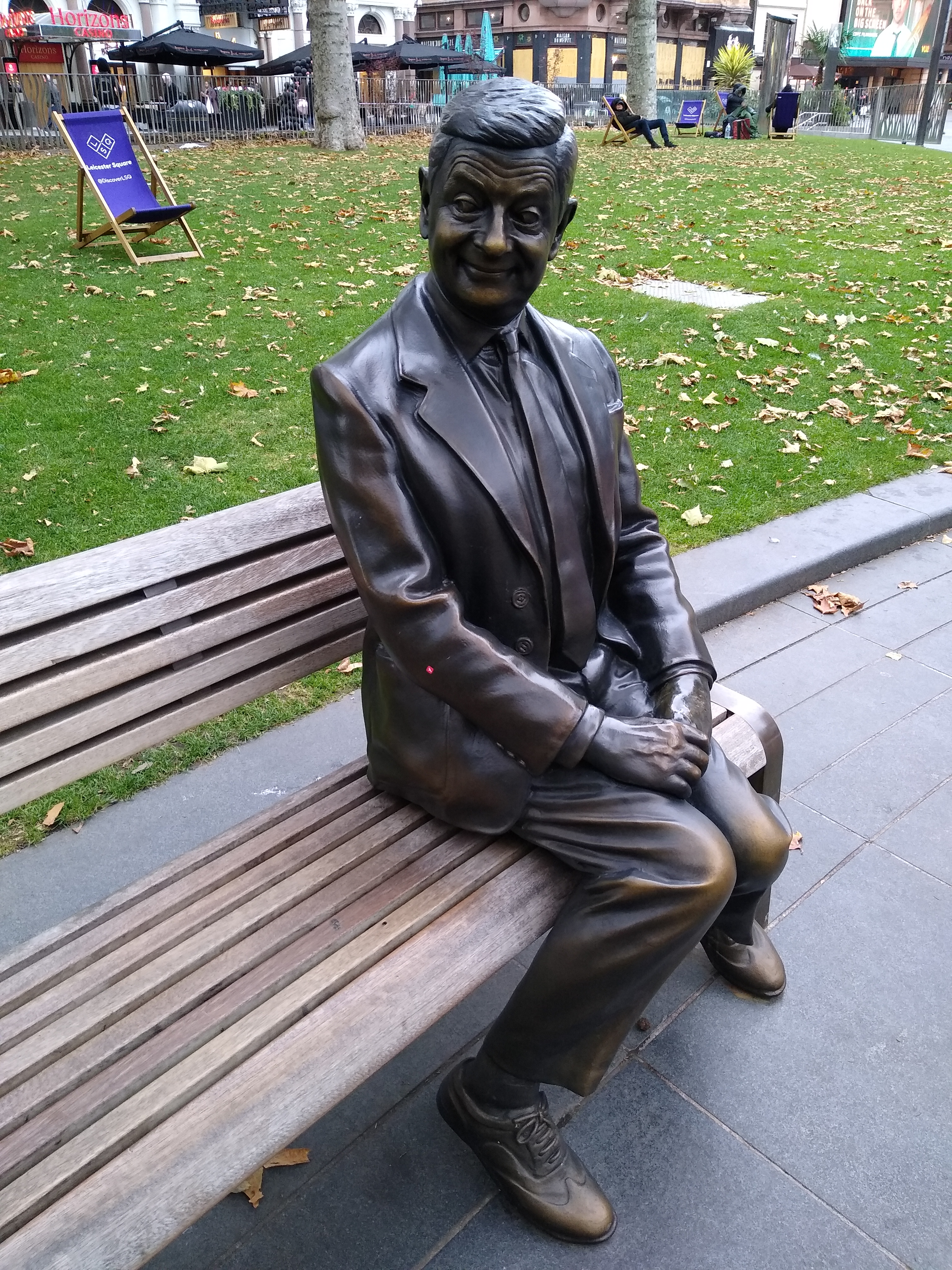
Mr. Bean statue

Scenes in the Square is a film-themed sculpture trail in Leicester Square, London. Eight sculptures were installed in February 2020. These sculptures depict characters from the last 100 years of cinema, including Laurel and Hardy, Mary Poppins, Batman, Bugs Bunny, Don Lockwood portrayed by Gene Kelly, Paddington Bear, Mr. Bean, and Wonder Woman. A sculpture of Harry Potter was installed later on in 2020 and then in 2021, a sculpture of the Iron Throne from Game of Thrones was added.

== Original exhibition ==
The first eight statues were installed in February 2020 and emphasise Leicester Square's long association with cinema. The site has been home to cinemas since 1930 and hosted its first film premiere in 1937. The original statues installed were those of Laurel and Hardy, Mary Poppins, Batman, Bugs Bunny, Don Lockwood portrayed by Gene Kelly, Paddington Bear, Mr. Bean and Wonder Woman representing the past 100 years of film. The exhibition is organised by the Heart of London Business Alliance in partnership with Westminster City Council and is supported by major movie studios.

Laurel and Hardy are perched on top of a ticket booth in the square, representing a famous scene from the 1929 film Liberty in which the pair balanced on a ledge on a skyscraper. Mary Poppins is depicted landing from flight with her umbrella raised, as featured in the 1964 film Mary Poppins. Batman stands 25 metres (82 ft) above the square, on the roof of the Odeon Leicester Square cinema. Bugs Bunny is depicted popping up out of a hole in a flower bed, in front of his mailbox, while eating a carrot. Gene Kelly is depicted in his role as Don Lockwood in the 1952 film Singin' in the Rain, swinging around a lamppost, in an iconic scene where the character sings the title song in the film. Permission to make the statue was granted by Kelly's wife, Patricia Ward Kelly. Paddington Bear is seated on a bench in the square, eating one of his favourite marmalade sandwiches. Mr. Bean, who was portrayed by Rowan Atkinson on television and in film, is also depicted sitting on a bench in the square. The erection of the statue also marked 30 years since the character's first appearance. The statue of Wonder Woman is above street level, depicted breaking through the wall of the Vue West End cinema, wielding her Lasso of Truth. The statue is inspired by a scene from the 2017 film Wonder Woman, in which the title character was played by Gal Gadot.

=== Gallery ===
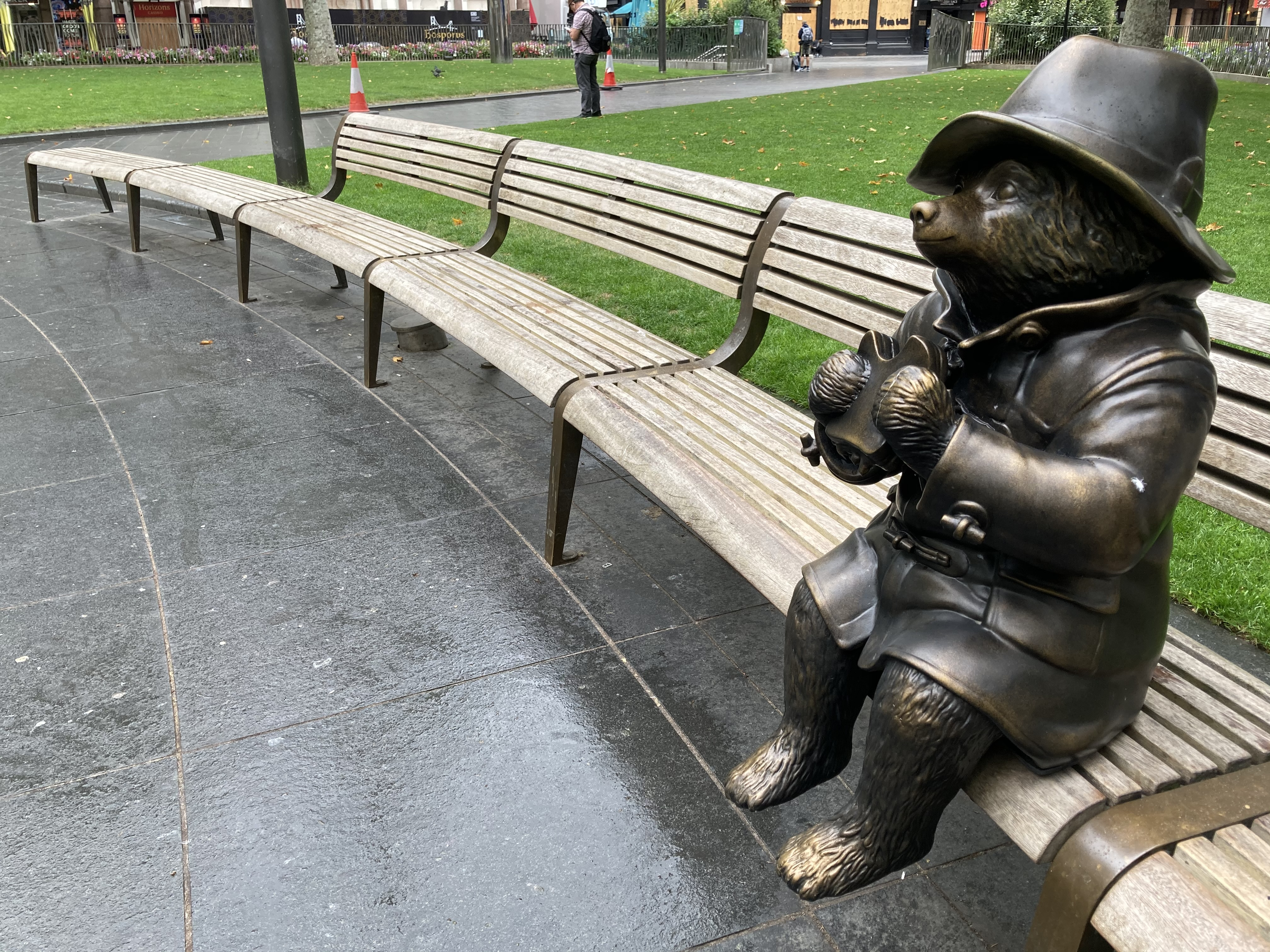
Paddington Bear

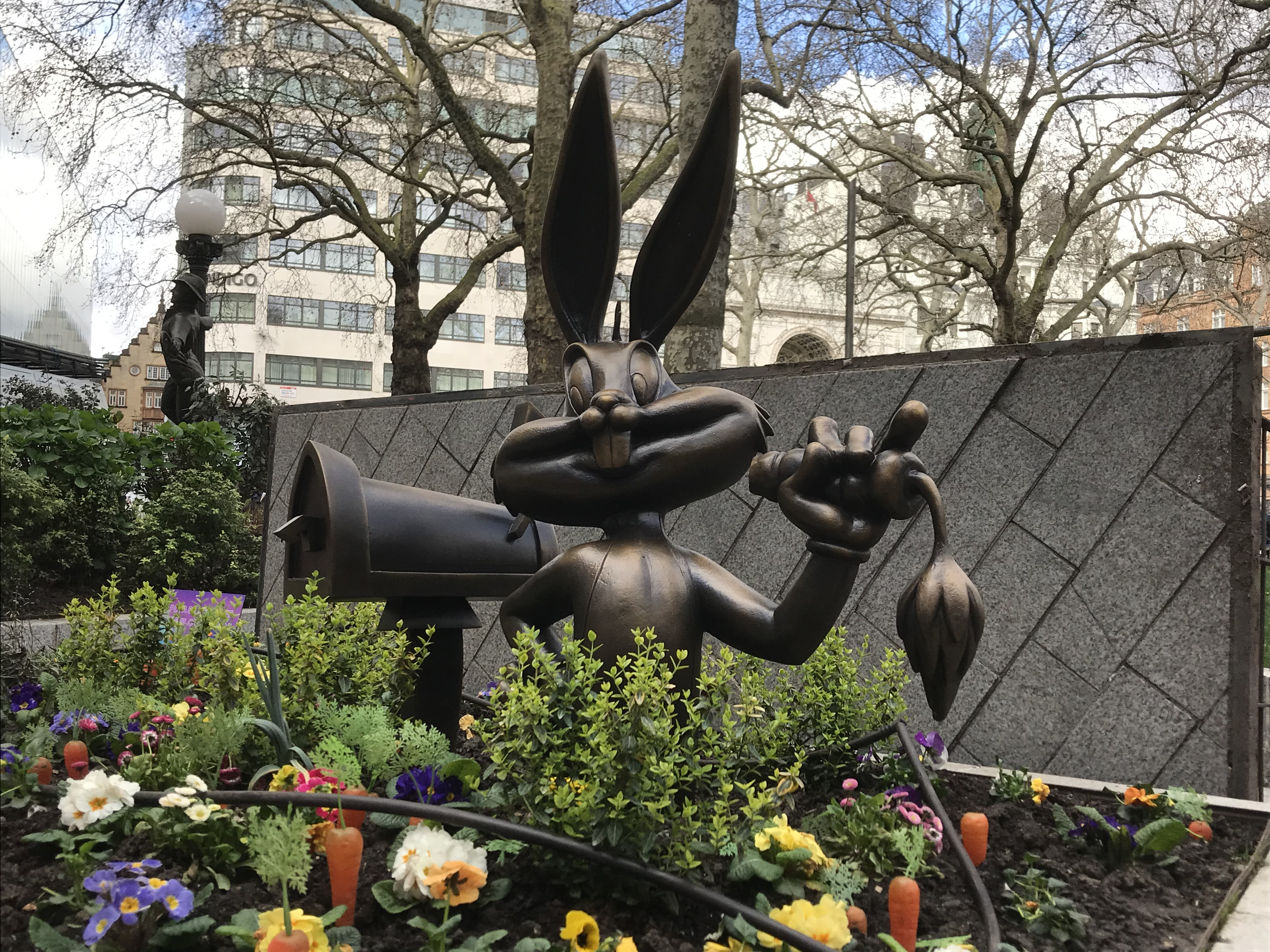
Bugs Bunny

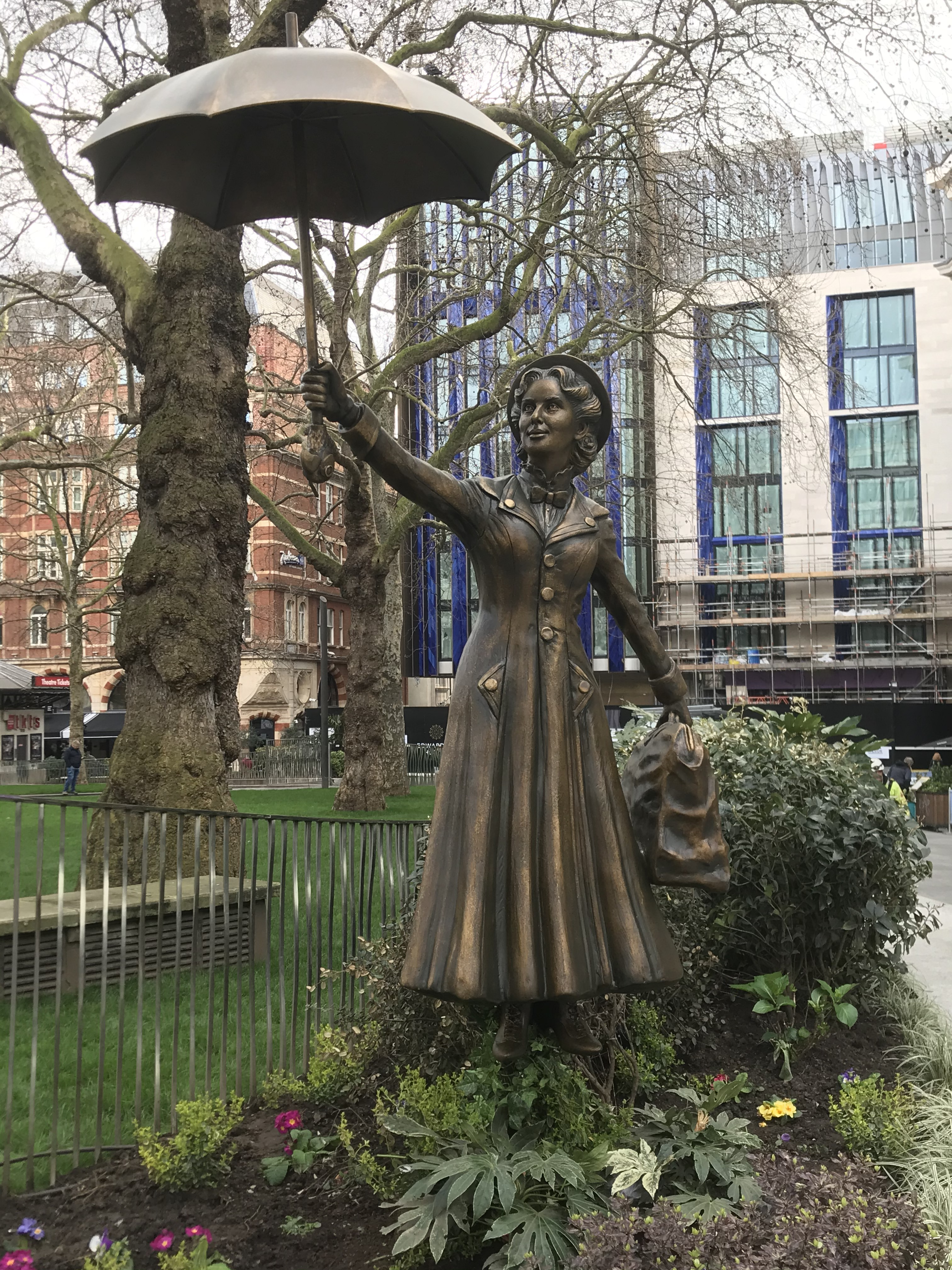
Mary Poppins

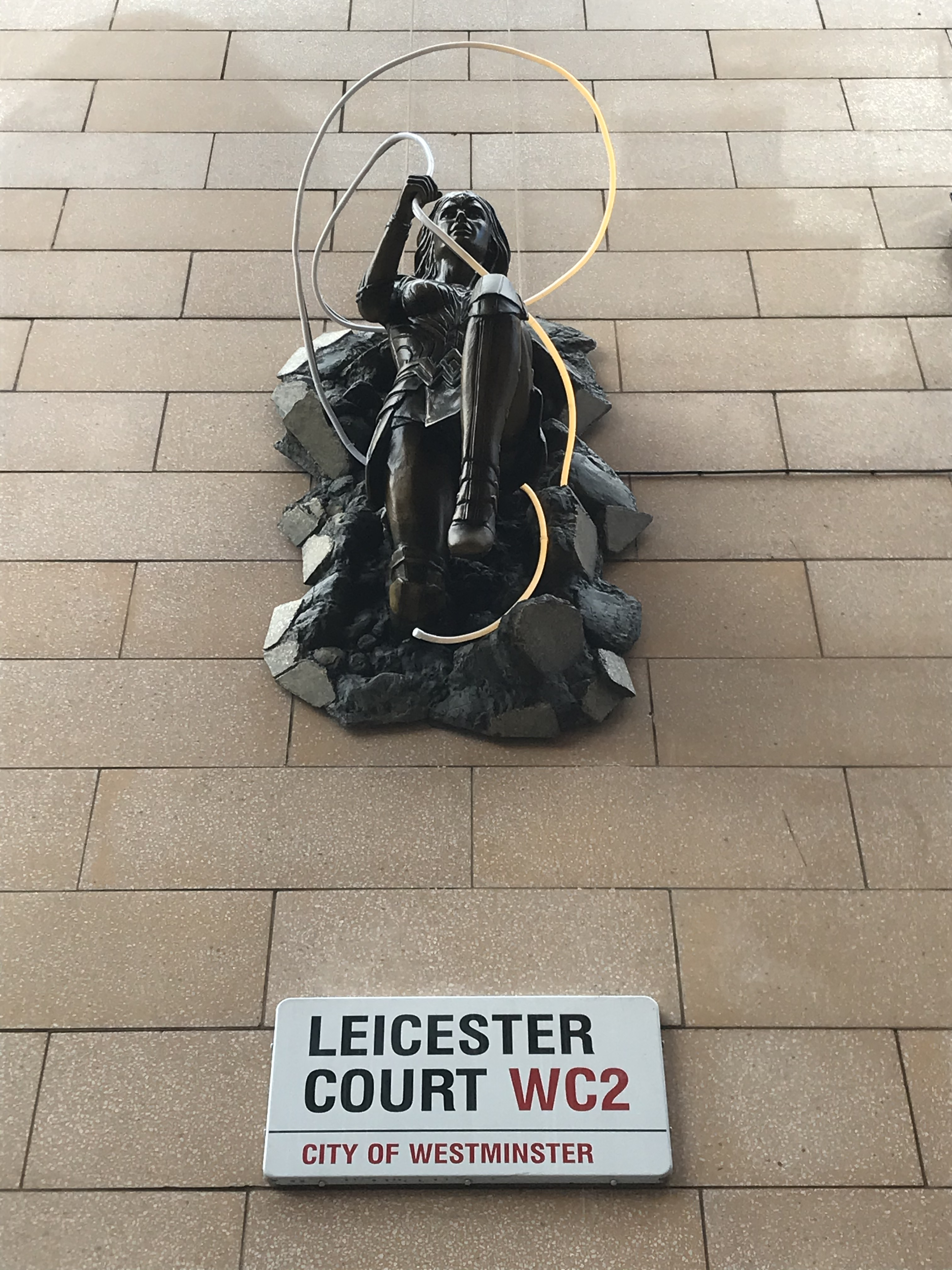
Wonder Woman

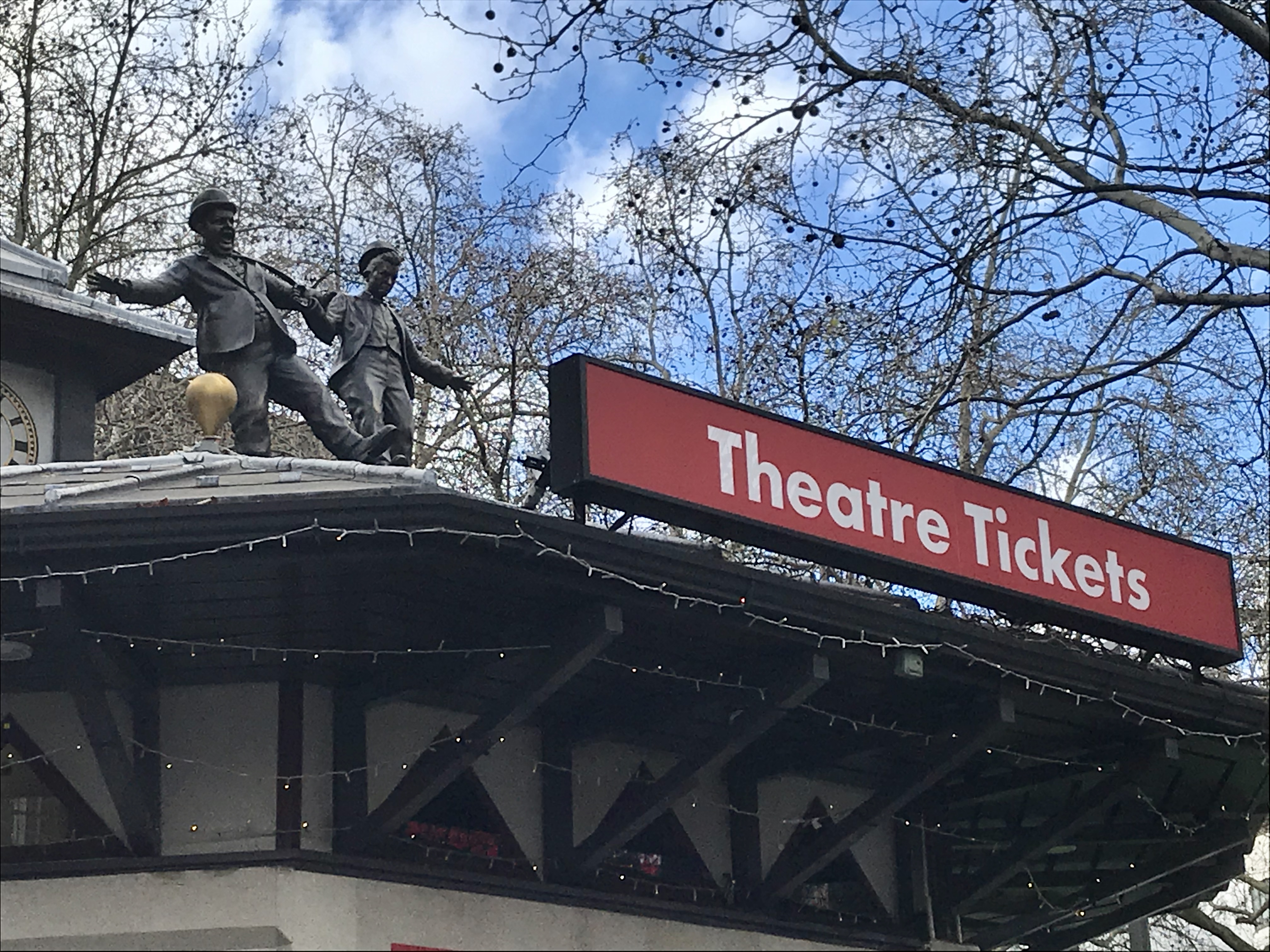
Laurel and Hardy

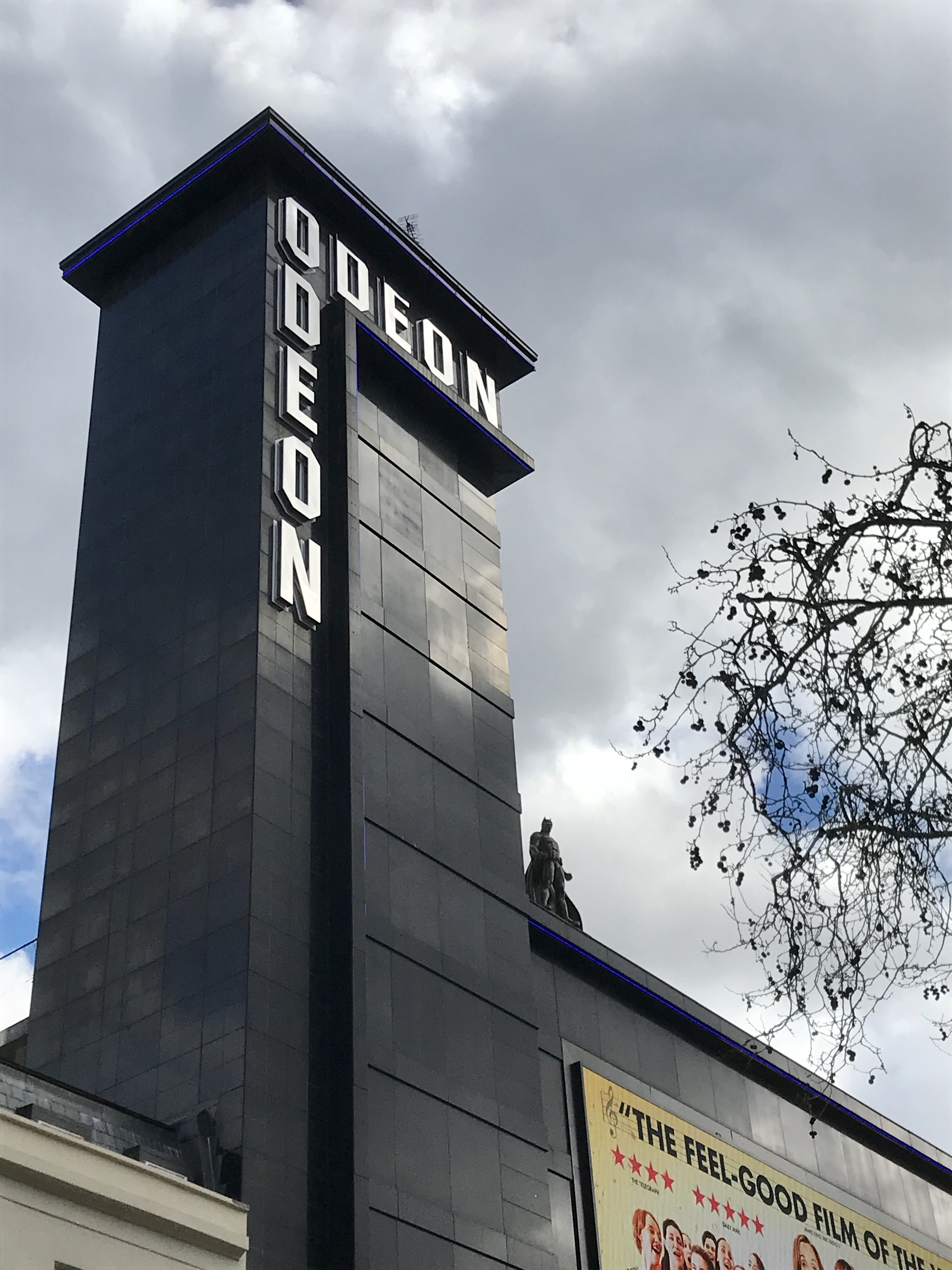
Batman on top of the Odeon Theatre

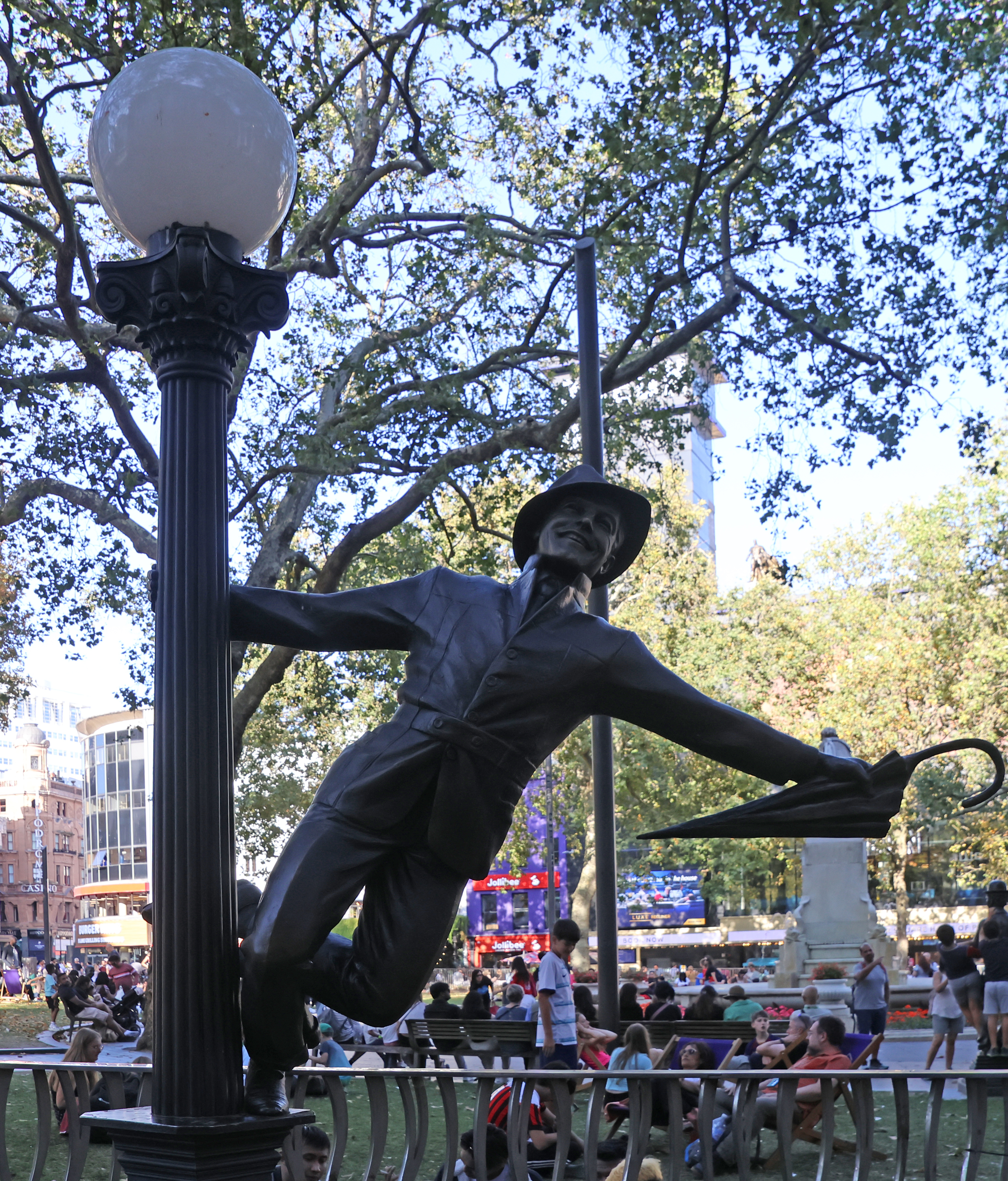
Gene Kelly

== Later additions ==
On 30 September 2020, a statue of Harry Potter riding a Nimbus 2000 broomstick was installed, becoming the ninth statue in the display. The scene was taken from Harry Potter and the Philosopher's Stone, which had its world premiere in Leicester Square in 2001. Around the same time Westminster council extended permission for the statues to remain in the square until at least July 2023. In June 2021, a statue of the Iron Throne from the HBO TV series Game of Thrones was unveiled to mark 10 years since the release of the first episode.

In July 2021, the statue of Bugs Bunny was modified with a basketball and backboard. The purpose of this was to mark the 16 July release of Space Jam: A New Legacy, in which the character is part of a basketball team. The backboard features a QR code to unlock online content on social media.

In December 2021 a statue of Clifford the Big Red Dog was installed ahead of the release of the film of the same name. The statue featured links to pages where visitors can donate to Battersea Dogs & Cats Home. It took a team of 15 people three months to create the sculpture in bronze. It is the largest sculpture in the series, measuring 3 metres (9.8 ft) long and 2 metres (6 ft 7 in) high and weighing 600 kilograms (1,300 lb).

A statue of Harrison Ford's character Indiana Jones in a pose from Raiders of the Lost Ark (1981) was unveiled on the north terrace of the square in June 2023.

A statue of Daniel Kaluuya was unveiled in October 2024, in a pose taken from the film Get Out.

A statue of Bridget Jones was unveiled in November 2025. In December 2025 statues of Bollywood stars Shah Rukh Khan and Kajol were unveiled, as their characters from the 1995 musical romance film Dilwale Dulhania Le Jayenge.

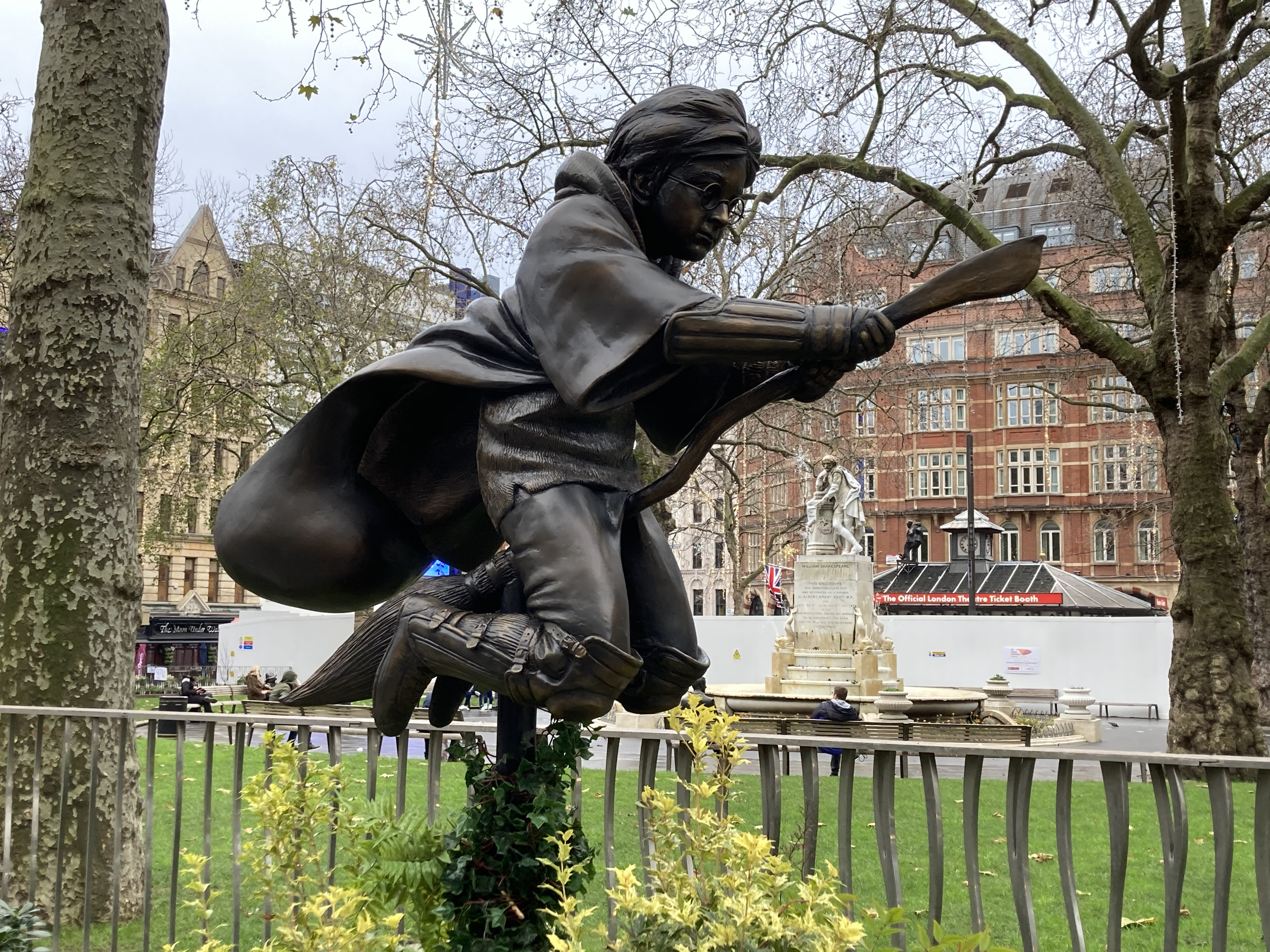
Harry Potter

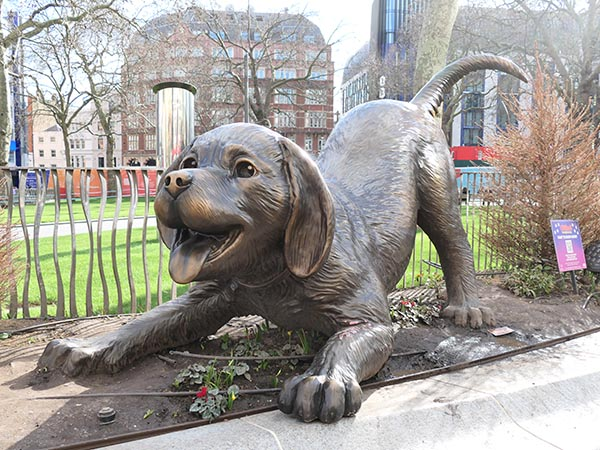
Clifford

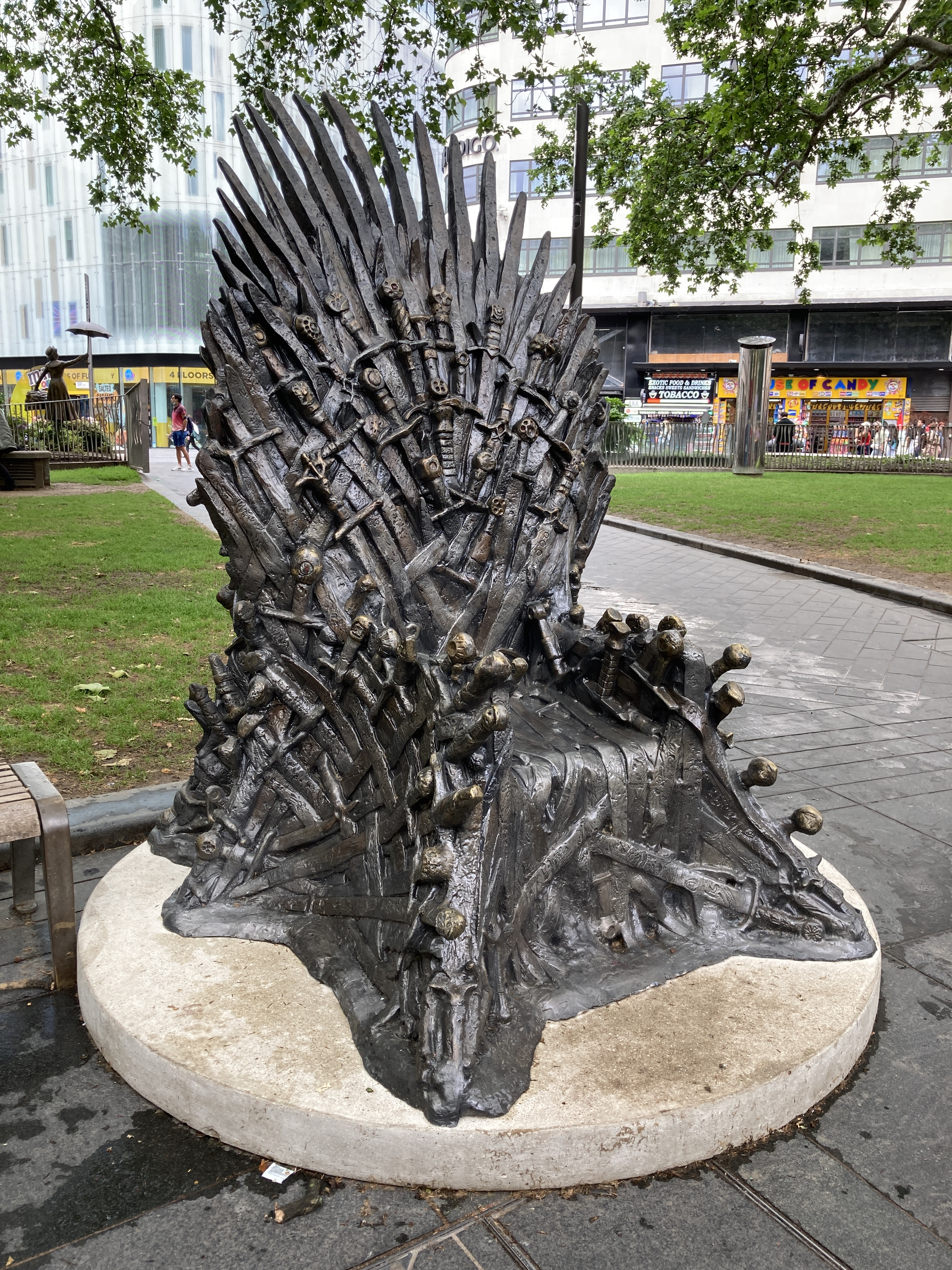
The Iron Throne

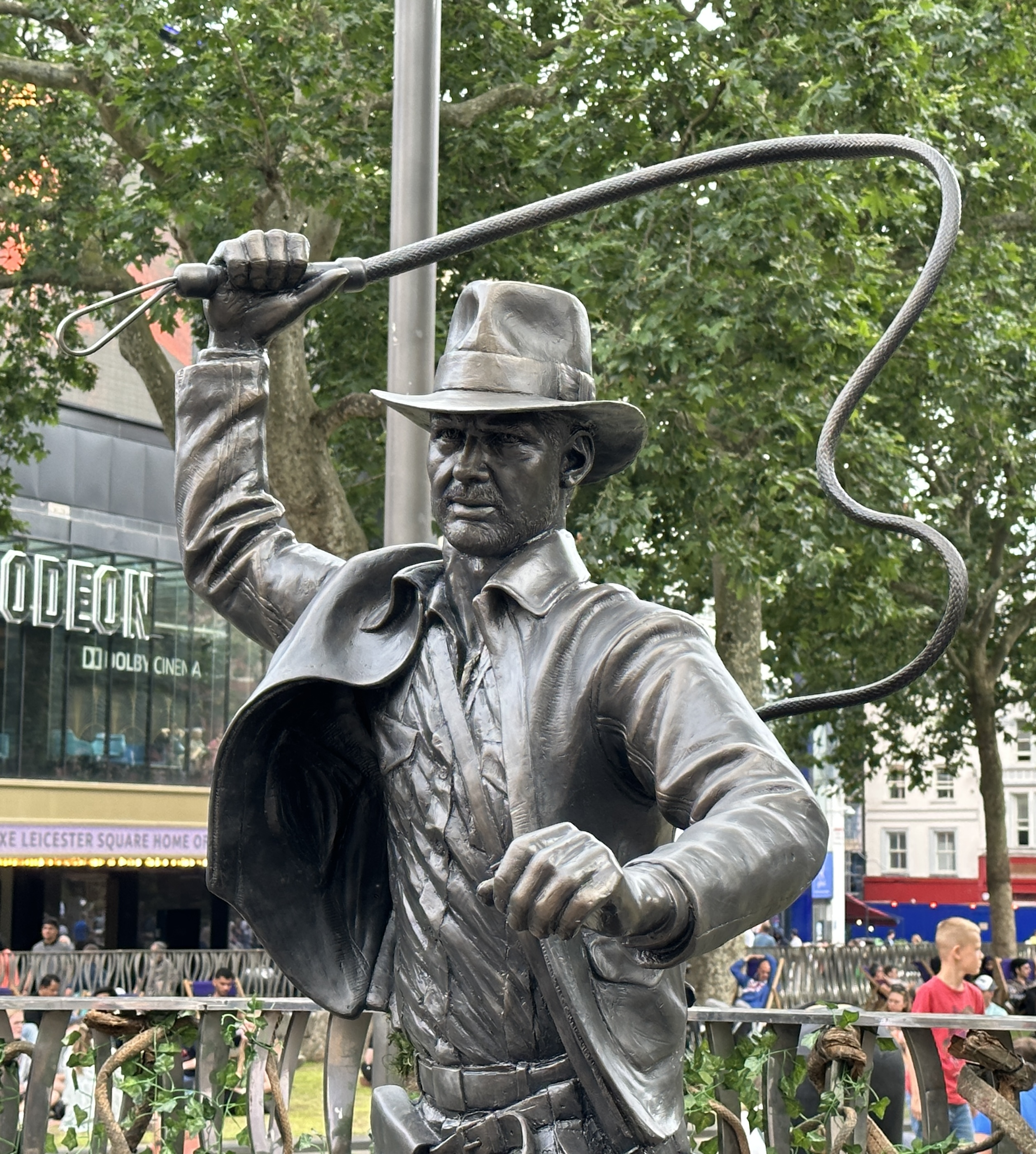
Indiana Jones

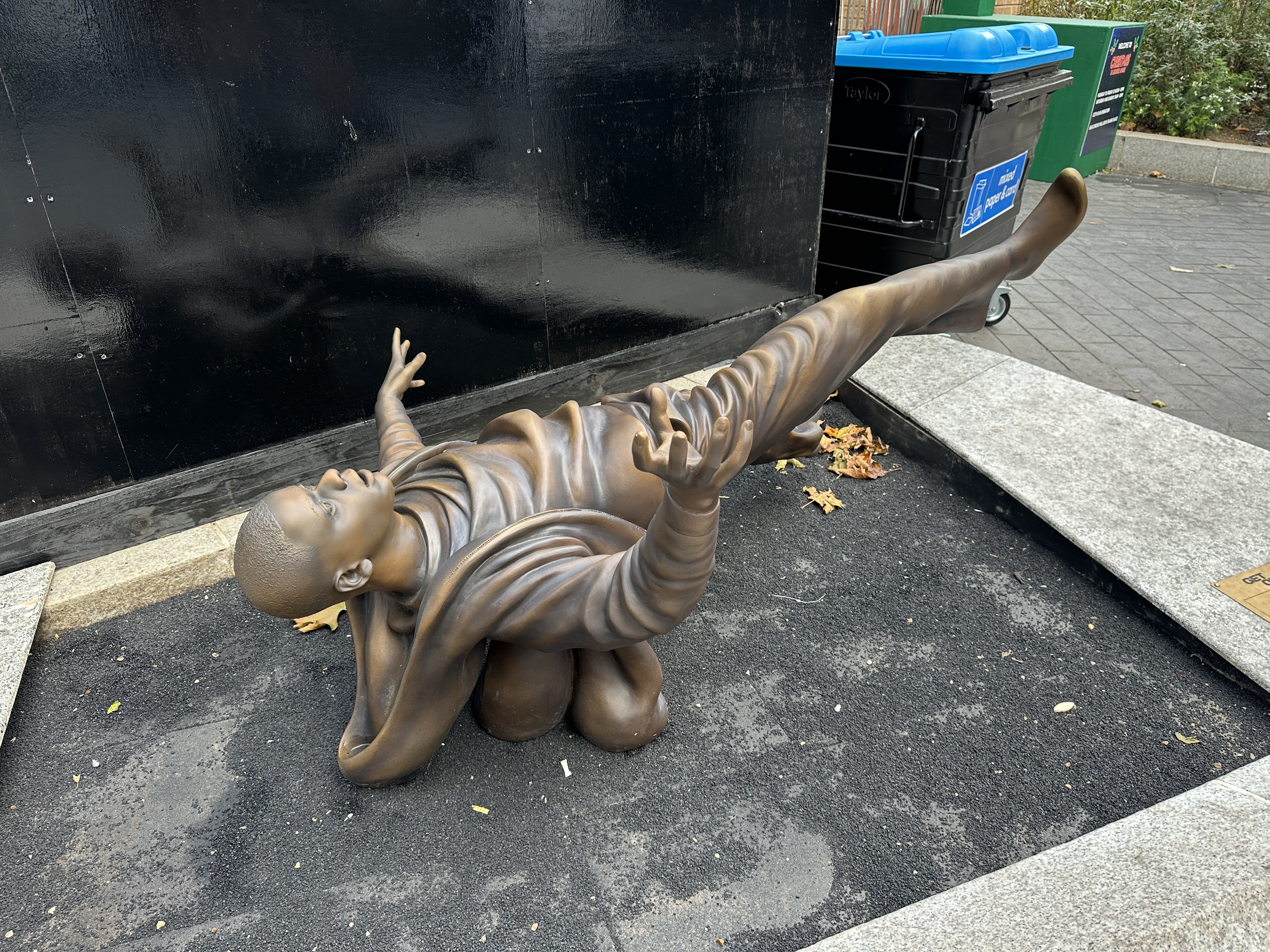
Daniel Kaluuya

== See also ==
- Statue of Charlie Chaplin, London, installed on Leicester Square in 1981
