= The Horses of Helios =

Sculpture by Rudy Weller

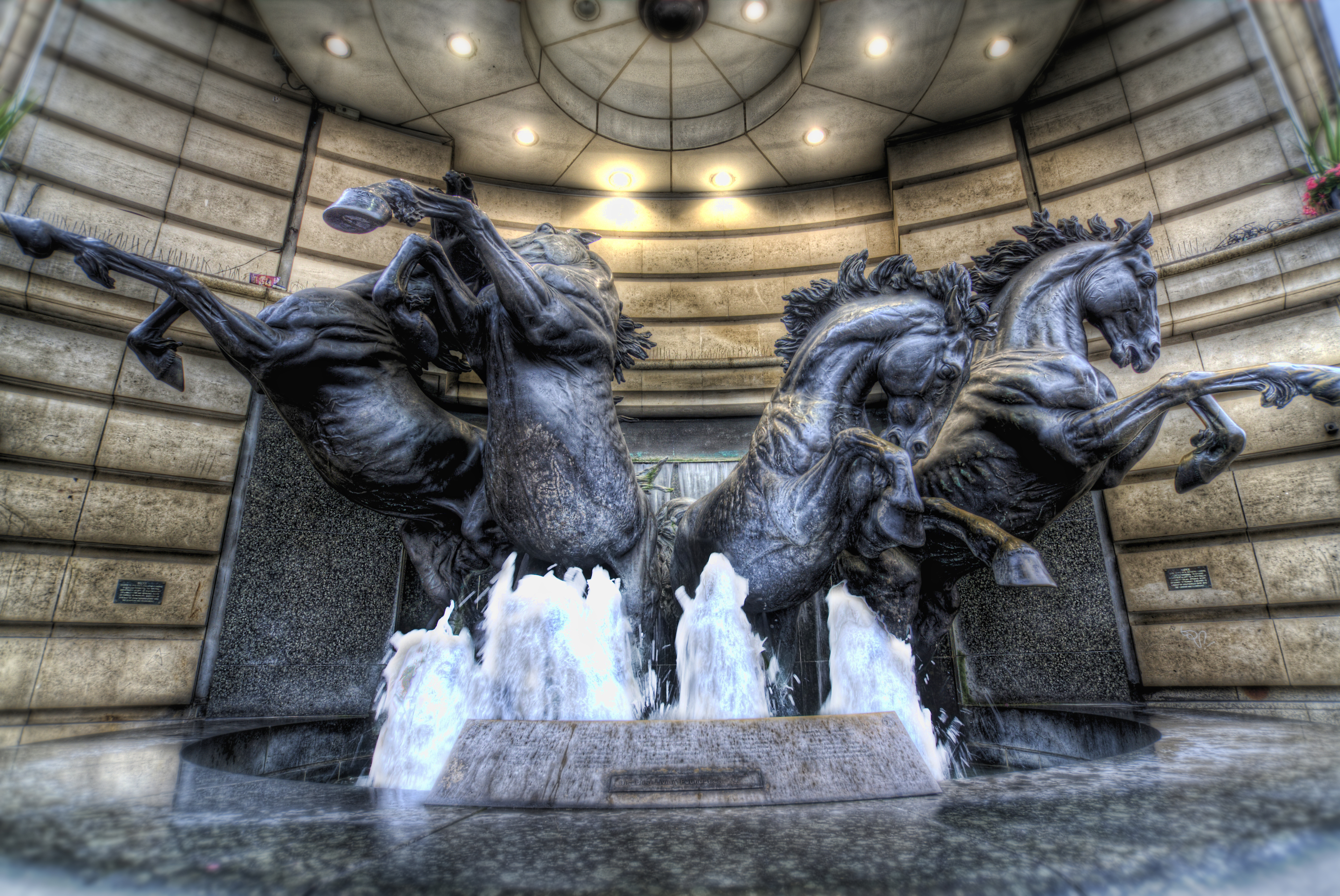
- The sculpture in 2010
- Artist: Rudy Weller
- Year: 1992
- Type: Sculpture
- Medium: Bronze
- Subject: Aethon; Eous; Phlegon; Pyrois
- Location: London, United Kingdom; 51.509977°N 0.133413°W

The Horses of Helios, also known as The Four Bronze Horses of Helios, is a bronze sculpture of four horses by Rudy Weller. It is one half of a commission installed in 1992 when the adjacent Criterion Theatre was refurbished. The other half, the Daughters of Helios or Three Graces, is a sculpture of three women leaping off the building six stories above.

== Appearance ==
The Horses of Helios comprises three bronze elements with dark patina: one pair of horses weighing approximately 4 tons, and two single horses. The four rearing horses appear to be bursting from the water of a fountain. It depicts Aethon, Eous, Phlegon, and Pyrois - the four horses of Helios, Greek god of the sun.

== History ==
The sculpture was installed in 1991 in a fountain under a canopy at the base of the Criterion Building, on the corner where Haymarket meets Coventry Street, near Piccadilly Circus in London. The building also houses the Criterion Theatre, and the sculpture was installed when the theatre was refurbished.

The Daughters of Helios or Three Graces depicts the three Charites - Aglaea, Euphrosyne, and Thalia - who in some accounts are the daughters of Helios and the naiad Aegle. The three female figures are made from gold-leaf-covered aluminium. They are installed at roof level, as if leaping off the 6th floor of the building immediately above the horses below.

From at least December 2020, the sculpture was behind a security fence and the fountain was not operating. At the end of 2024 the fence was removed, and the fountain now sometimes operates.

== Gallery ==
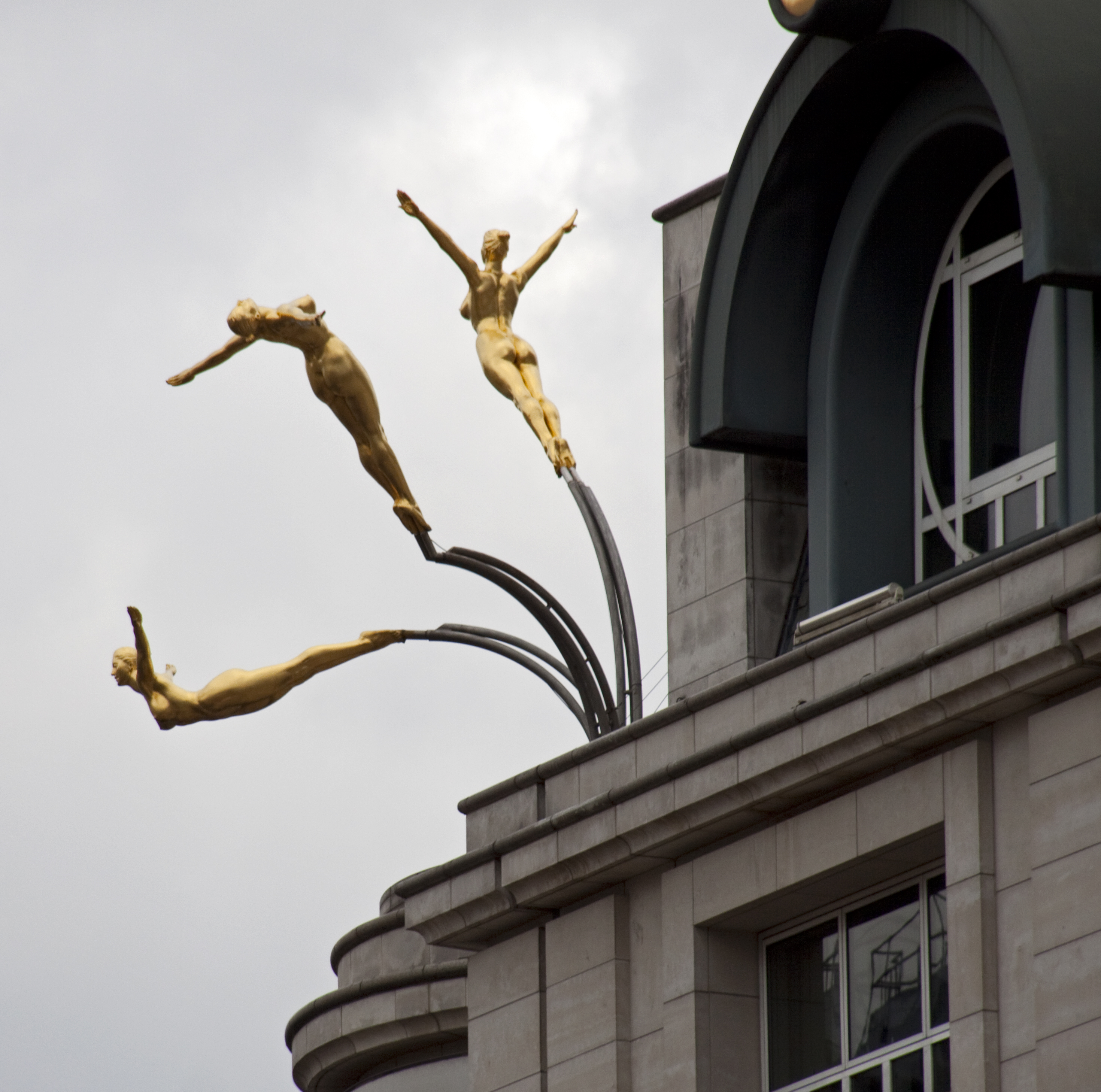
Daughters of Helios

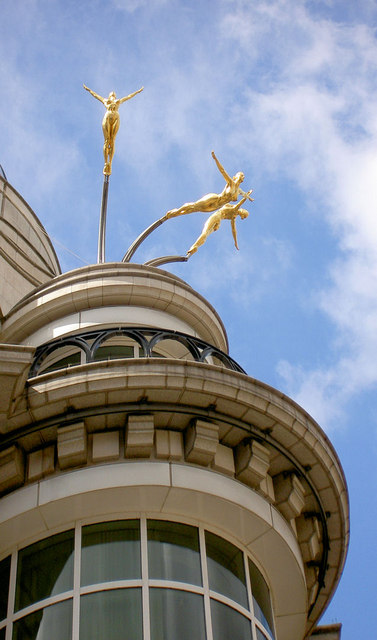
Daughters of Helios
