= Statue of William Shakespeare, Leicester Square =

Statue in London by Giovanni Fontana

William Shakespeare
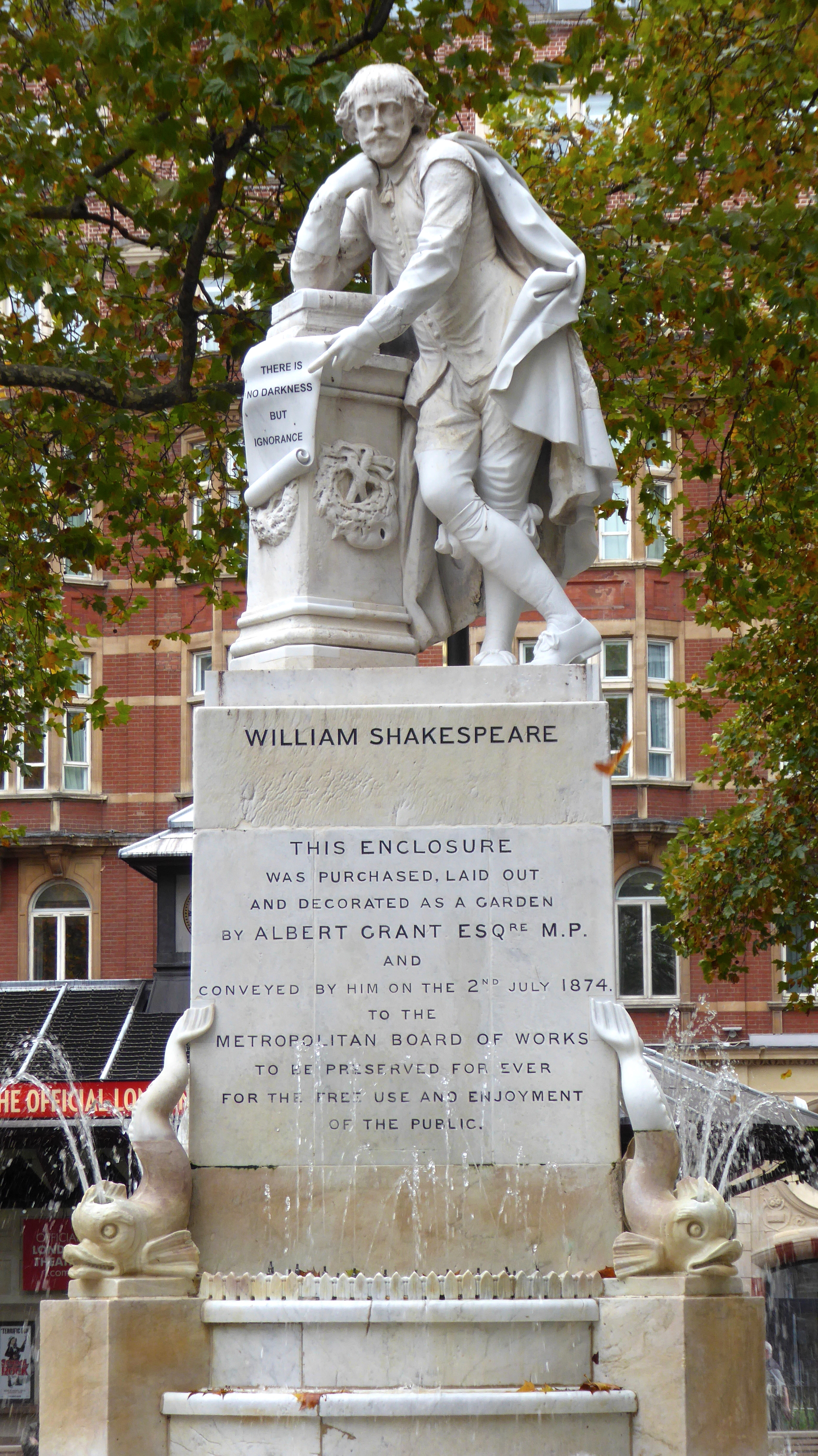
- Artist: Giovanni Fontana after Peter Scheemakers
- Year: 1874
- Medium: Marble
- Location: Leicester Square, London W1

Listed Building – Grade II
- Official name: William Shakespeare Statue and fountain with busts of Hogarth, Hunter, Newton and Reynolds in garden of square
- Designated: 24 February 1958
- Reference no.: 1221890

A statue of William Shakespeare, by the sculptor Giovanni Fontana after an original by Peter Scheemakers, has formed the centrepiece of Leicester Square Gardens in London since 1874.

== Description and history ==
The marble figure, copied from Scheemakers's 18th-century monument to Shakespeare in Poets' Corner, Westminster Abbey, stands on a pedestal flanked by dolphins at the centre of a fountain. It is the result of improvements to the gardens made by the financier Albert Grant, who bought the Square in 1874 and had it refurbished to a design by James Knowles.

The scroll held by Shakespeare is inscribed with a quotation from Twelfth Night (Act IV, Scene II), THERE IS NO DARKNESS BUT IGNORANCE, where the original in Poets' Corner has a misquoted passage from The Tempest. The Leicester Square statue also differs from its model in omitting portrait reliefs of Henry V, Richard III and Elizabeth I from the plinth on which Shakespeare rests. The inscription on the pedestal in Leicester Square reads:

THIS ENCLOSURE/ WAS PURCHASED, LAID OUT/ AND DECORATED AS A GARDEN/ BY ALBERT GRANT ESQ[UI]RE M.P./ AND/ CONVEYED BY HIM ON THE 2ND JULY 1874/ TO THE/ METROPOLITAN BOARD OF WORKS/ TO BE PRESERVED FOR EVER/ FOR THE FREE USE AND ENJOYMENT/ OF THE PUBLIC

The statue is listed at Grade II. In 2012 it underwent restoration, and the cleaning was completed – by Tom Brown of London Stone Carving Limited – and new water features added in 2014.

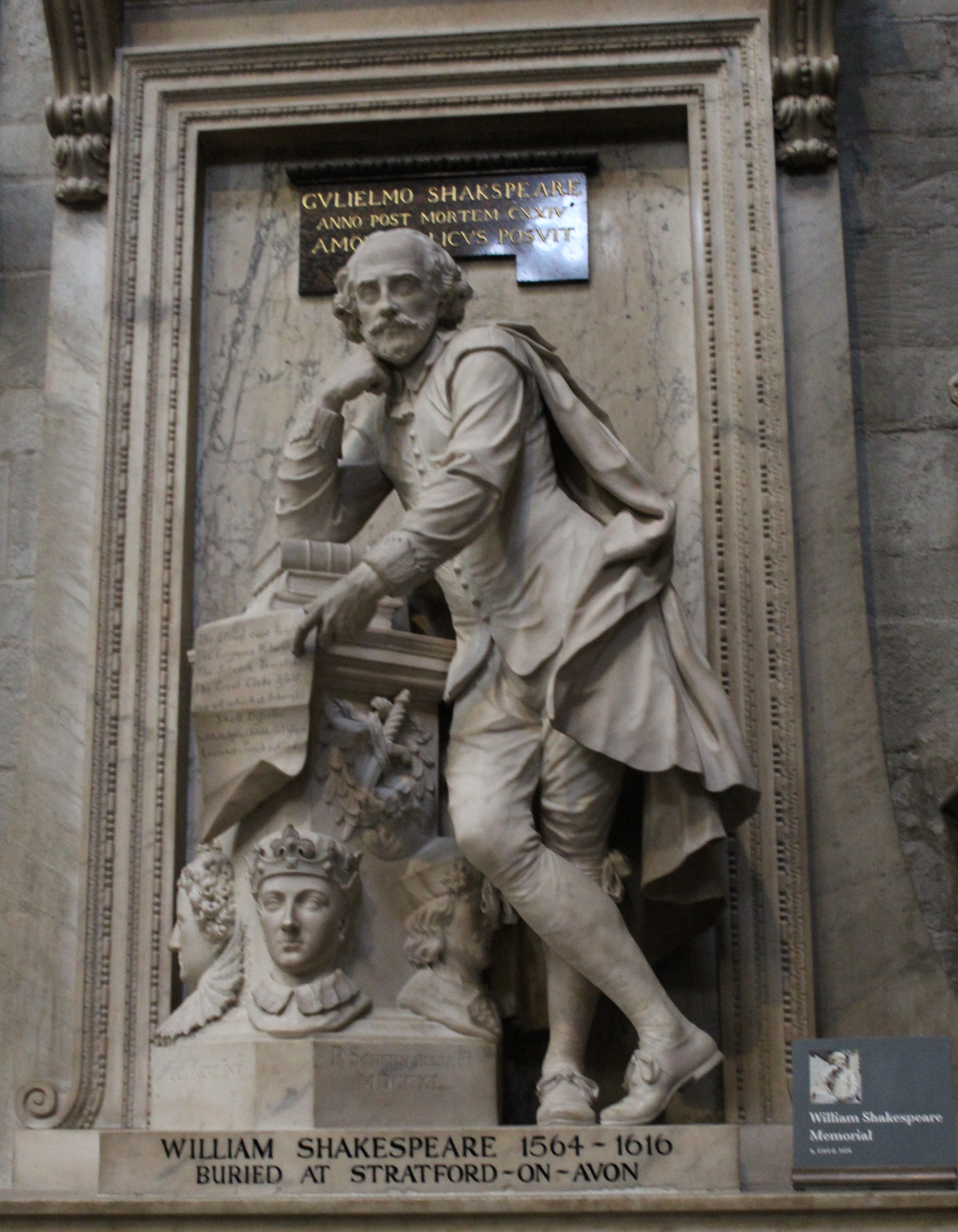
The original memorial in Poets' Corner, Westminster Abbey

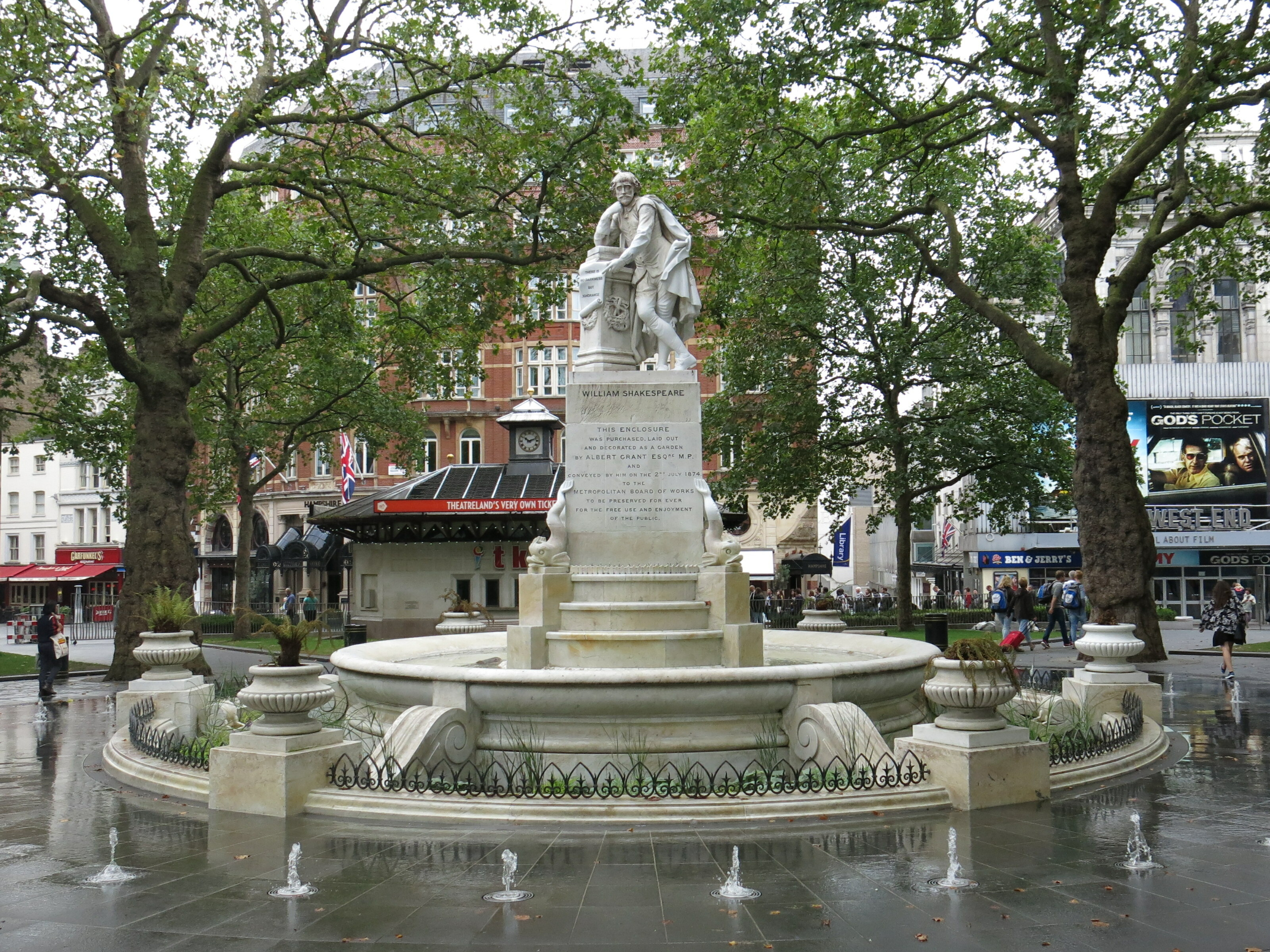
Full view of the fountain

== Bibliography ==
- Ward-Jackson, Philip (2011). Public Sculpture of Historic Westminster: Volume 1. Public Sculpture of Britain. Liverpool: Liverpool University Press.
